= Dubai =

Largest city in the United Arab Emirates

Dubai دبي Dubayy
- City
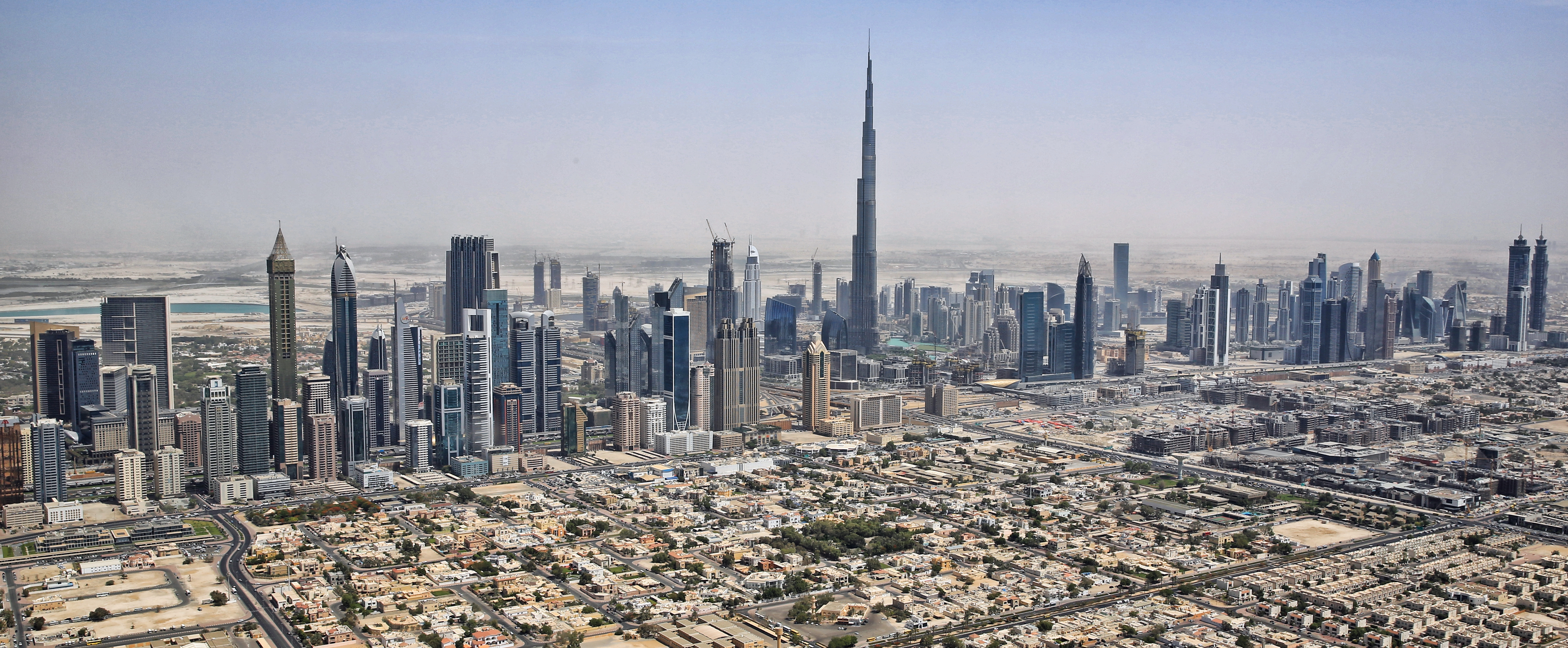
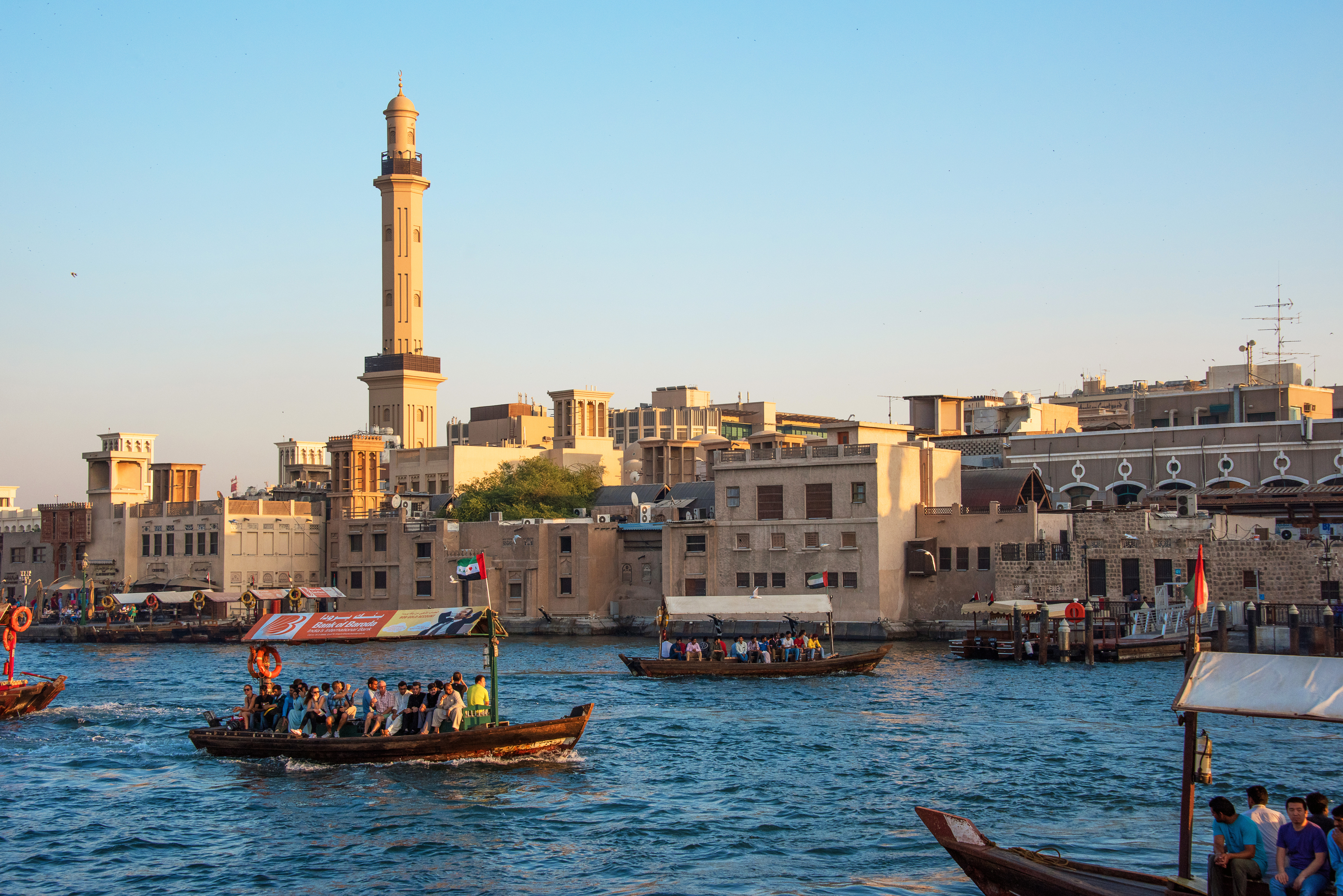
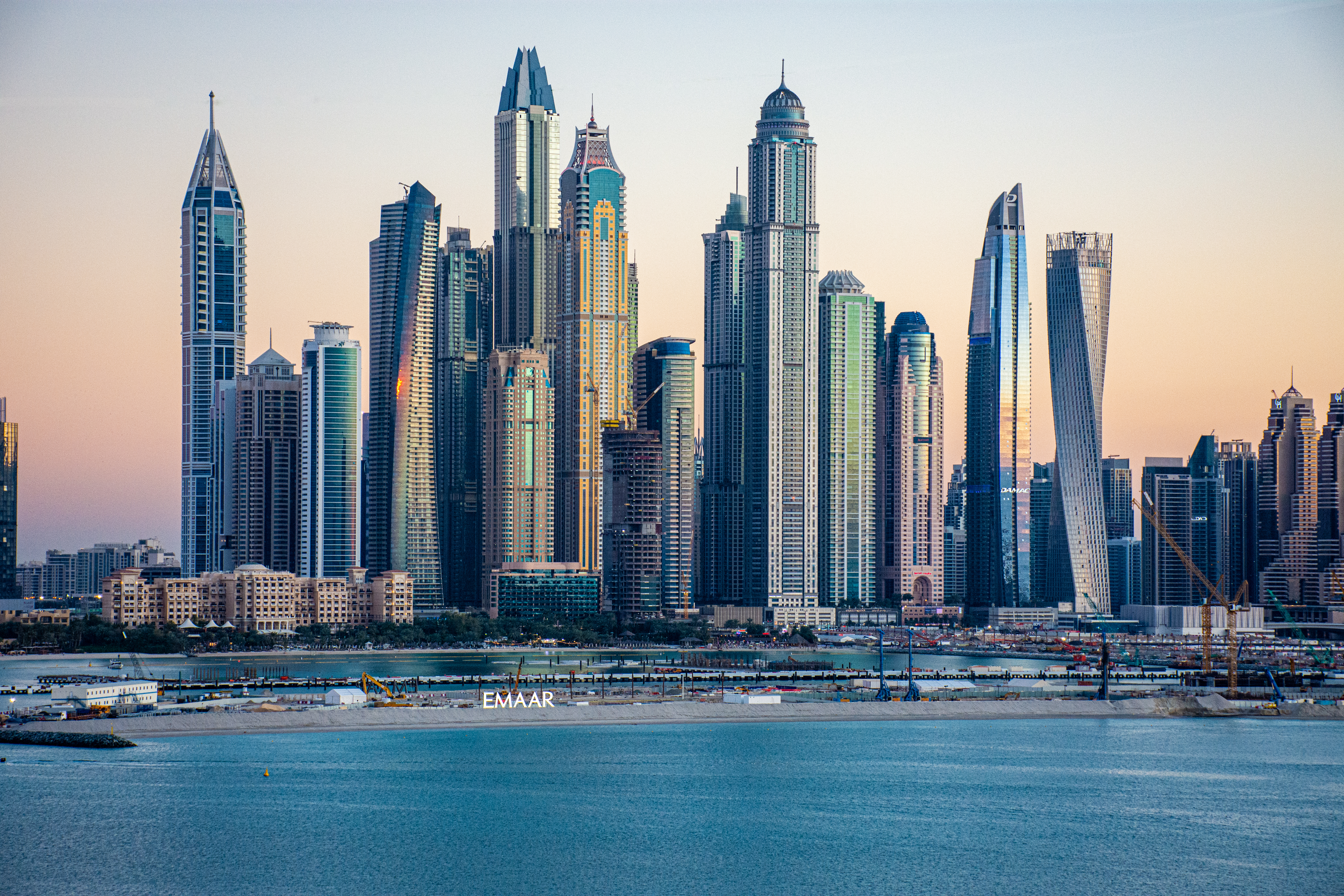
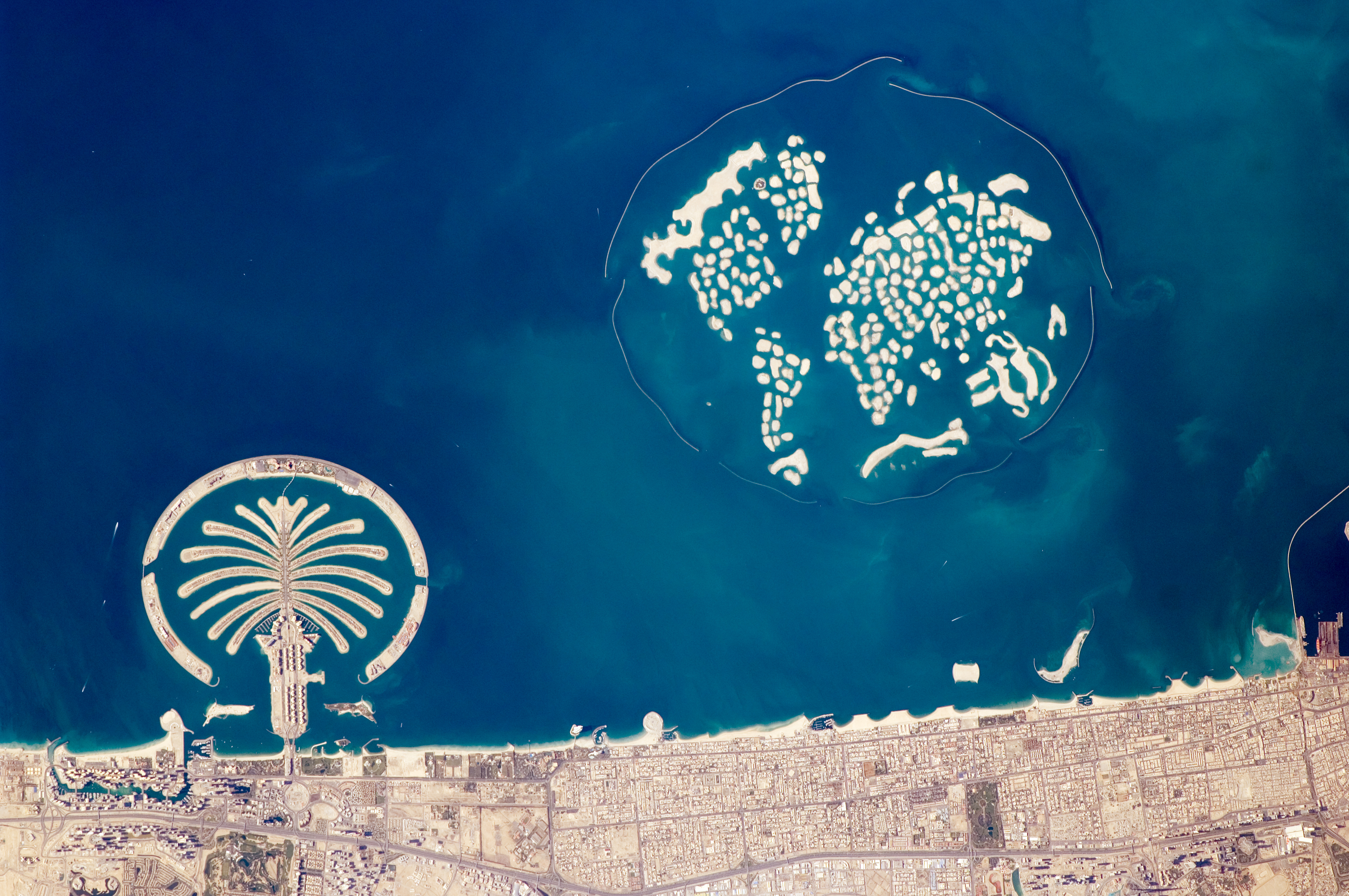
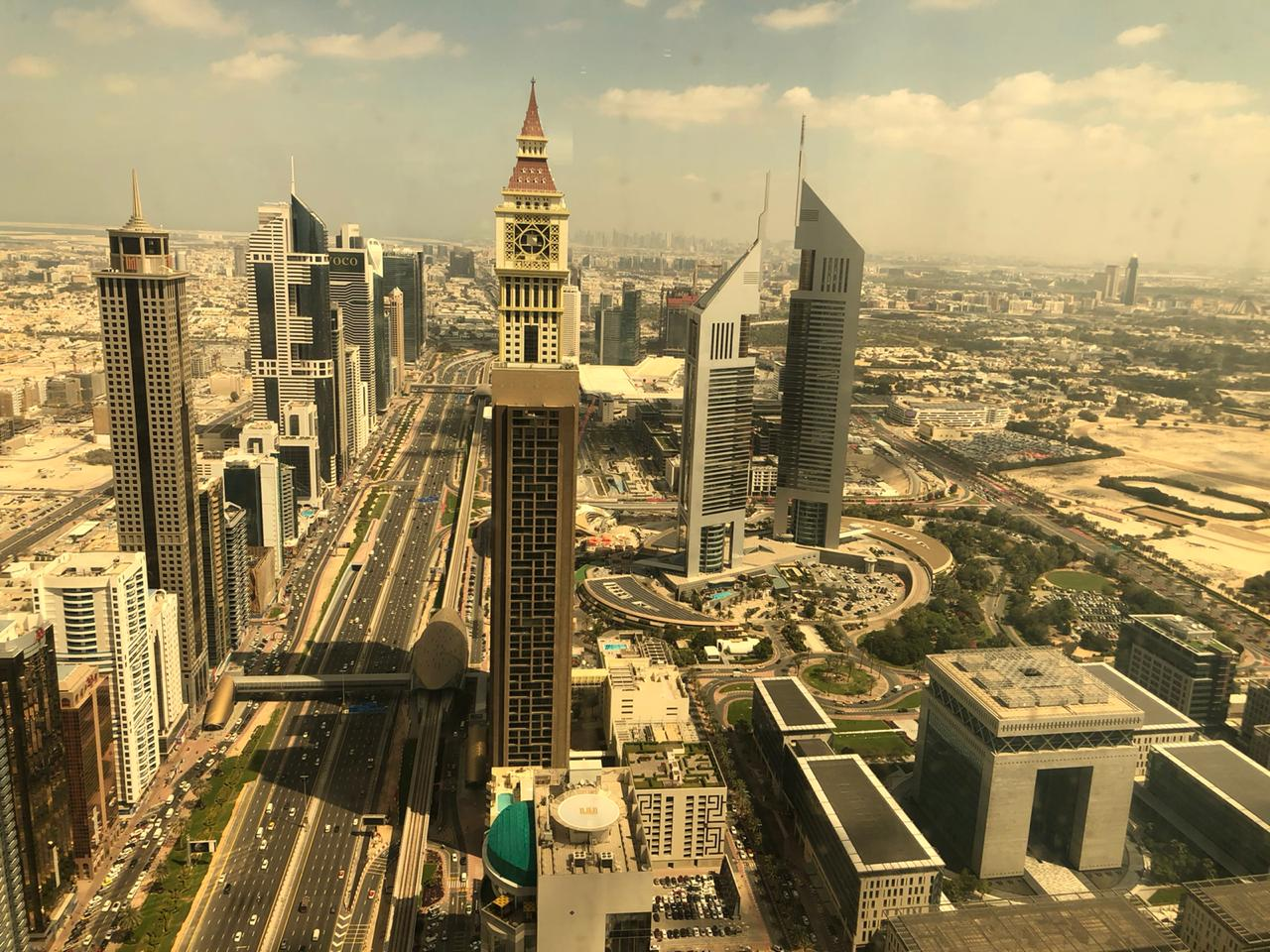
- Dubai's skyline Burj Khalifa and Downtown Dubai Creek Dubai Marina Palm Jumeirah and The World Islands Burj Al Arab Sheikh Zayed Road

- Flag Seal Wordmark
- Nicknames: DXB, Dar Al-Hay, The Pearl of the Gulf,, Dānat ad-Dunyā, The Venice of the Gulf, The City of the World, The City of Gold
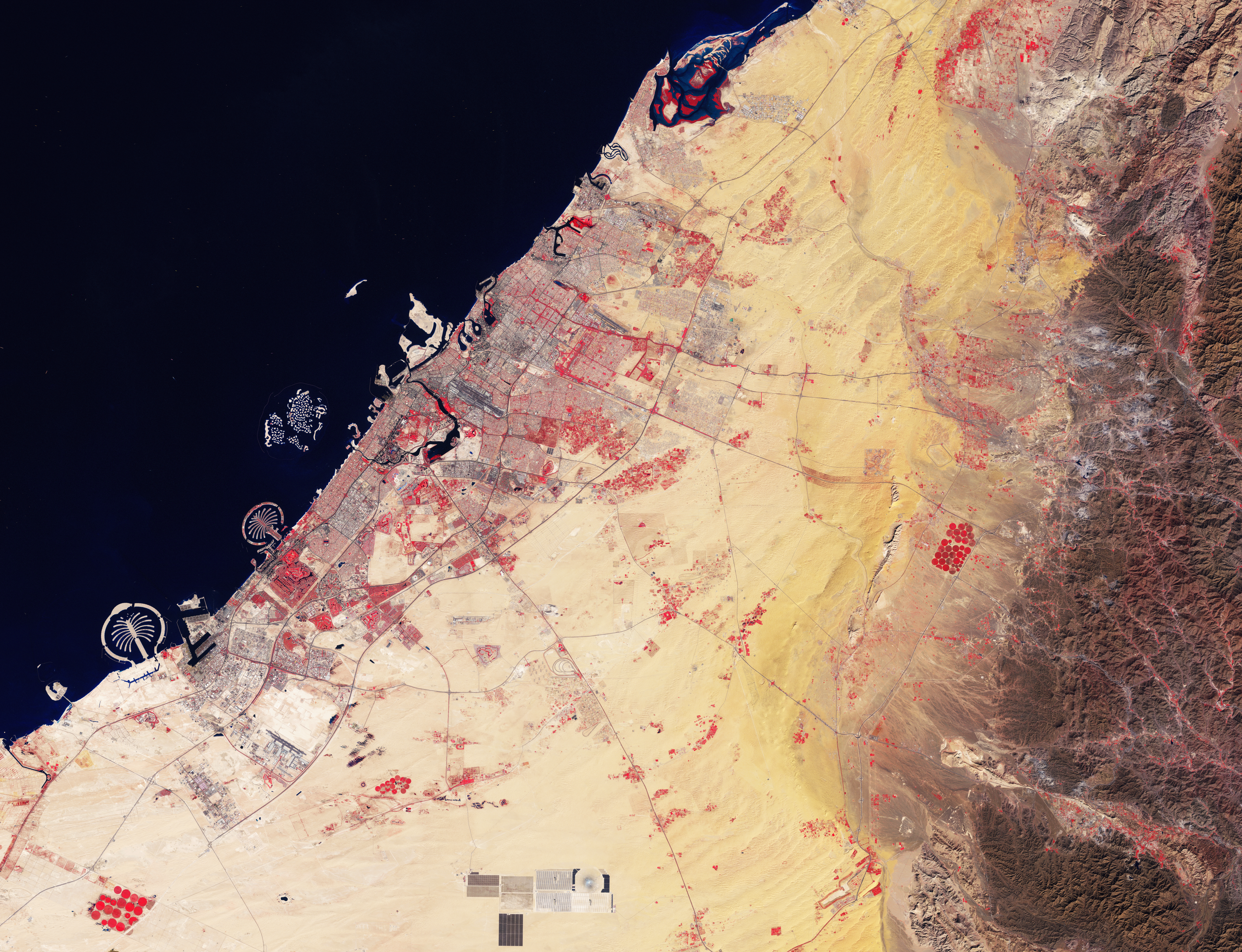
- Dubai in United Arab Emirates OSM Dubai in Persian Gulf Dubai in Middle East Dubai in Asia
- Coordinates: 25°12′17″N 55°16′15″E
- Country: United Arab Emirates
- Emirate: Dubai
- First mentioned: 1095
- First established: 1822
- Founder: Obeid bin Said & Maktoum bin Butti Al Maktoum

Government
  - Type: Absolute monarchy
  - Body: Dubai Executive Council
  - Director General of Dubai Municipality: Marwan Bin Ghalita
  - Ruler of Dubai: Mohammed bin Rashid Al Maktoum

Area
  - Urban: 1,491 km^{2} (576 sq mi)
  - Metro: 3,913 km^{2} (1,511 sq mi)

Population (2025)
  - City: 3,944,751
  - Rank: 1st
  - Urban: 4,945,000
  - Urban density: 3,317/km^{2} (8,590/sq mi)
  - Metro: 6,359,527
  - Metro density: 1,625/km^{2} (4,209/sq mi)
- Demonym: Dubaian

GDP (nominal, 2024)
  - City: US$156.3 billion
  - Metro: US$224.1 billion
- Time zone: UTC+04:00 (UAE Standard Time)
- Climate: Hot desert climate (BWh)
- Website: dubai.ae

Dubai (Note: /duːˈbaɪ/ doo-BYE; Modern Standard Arabic: دُبَيّ; Emirati Arabic: دِبَيّ, romanised: /diˈbej/) is the most populous city in the United Arab Emirates and the capital of the Emirate of Dubai. It is on a creek on the southeastern coast of the Persian Gulf. As of 2025, its population stands at 4 million, 92% of whom are expatriates. The wider urban area includes Sharjah and has a population of 5 million people as of 2023, while the Dubai–Sharjah–Ajman metropolitan area has a population of 6 million people.

Founded in the early 18th century as a pearling and fishing settlement, Dubai became a regional trade hub in the 20th century after declaring itself a free port (1901) and extending the Creek (1961). Modest oil revenue helped accelerate Dubai's development from the 1960s to the 1990s, when the city started to diversify its economy. In 2018, oil production contributed less than 1% to the emirate's GDP.

Rapid construction since the 1990s has produced one of the world's densest skylines, including the world's tallest building, the Burj Khalifa. Extensive land-reclamation projects have added more than 300 kilometres (190 mi) of artificial coastline. The city has a large real estate market, especially in the luxury segment.

Dubai's economy centres on trade, tourism, aviation, financial services, and real estate. The Dubai International Financial Centre (DIFC) is one of the world's major financial centres. In 2024, Dubai was the seventh most-visited city globally. Dubai International Airport (DXB) is the world's busiest airport for international passenger traffic, handling over 92 million passengers in 2024.

== Etymology ==
Many theories have been proposed about the origin of the word "Dubai". One theory suggests the word used to be the souq in Ba. The linguist Zana Vahidzadeh (Dana Pishdar) holds that the word comes from 'money', a reference to the prosperity of the trading centre or that the word refers to 'two brothers'—Deira and Bur Dubai.

The poet and scholar Ahmad Mohammad Obaid traces it to the same word, but to its alternative meaning of "baby locust" (جراد) due to the abundance of locusts in the area before settlement.

== History ==
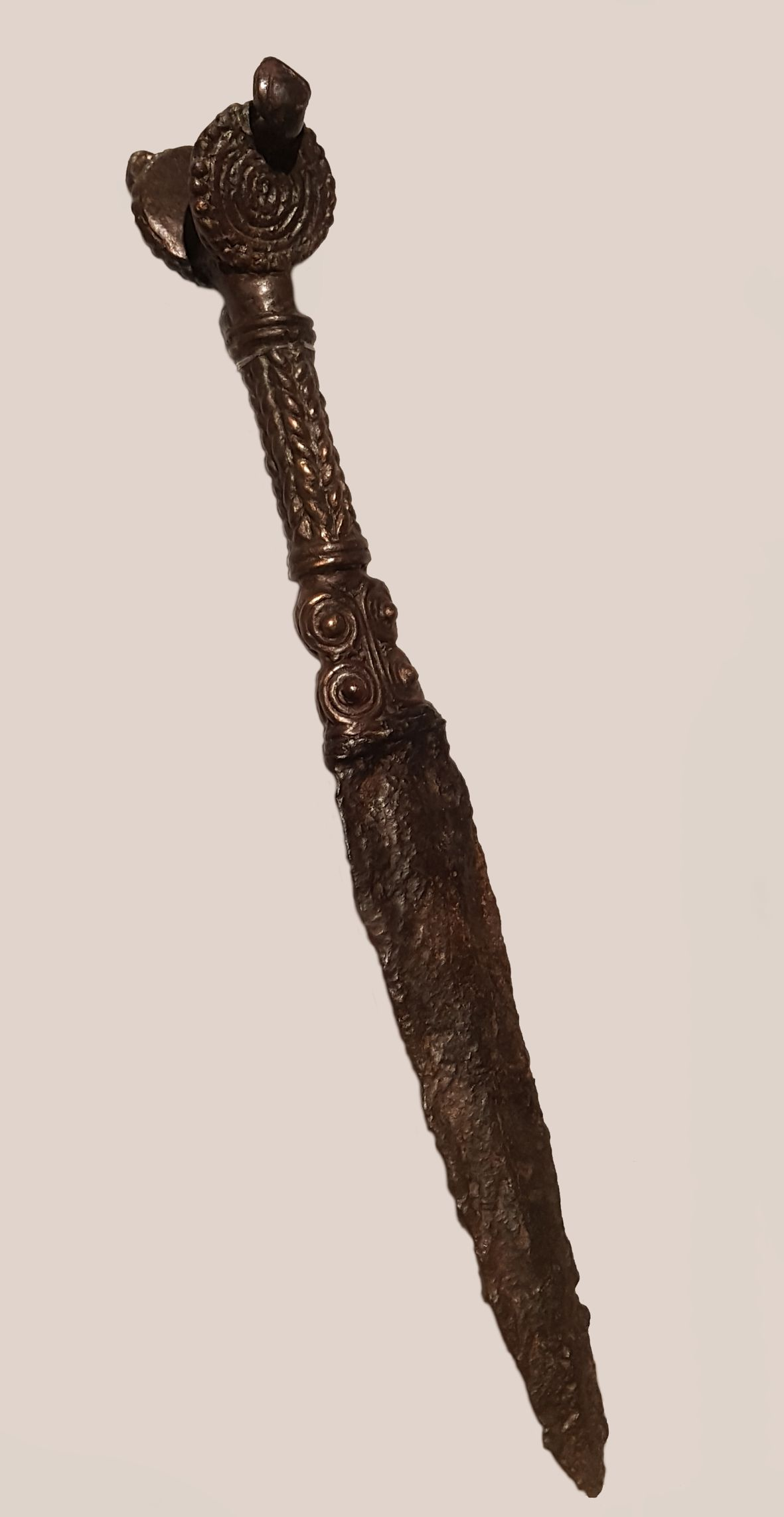
Bronze and iron alloy dagger, Saruq Al Hadid archaeological site (1100 BC)

The history of human settlement in the area now defined as the United Arab Emirates is complex and extensive, formed by the extensive trading links between the civilisations of the Indus Valley and Mesopotamia, and even by cultures as far afield as the Levant. Archaeological finds in the emirate of Dubai, particularly at Al-Ashoosh, Al Sufouh, and the notably rich trove from Saruq Al Hadid show settlement through the Ubaid and Hafit periods, the Umm Al Nar and Wadi Suq periods, and the three Iron Ages in the UAE. The area was known to the Sumerians as Magan and was a source of metallic goods, notably copper and bronze.

The area was covered with sand about 5,000 years ago as the coast retreated inland, becoming part of the city's present coastline. Pre-Islamic ceramics have been discovered from the 3rd and 4th centuries. Before the introduction of Islam to the area, people in this region worshiped Bajir (or Bajar). After the spread of Islam in the region, the Umayyad Caliph of the eastern Islamic world conquered southeast Arabia and drove out the Sassanians. Excavations by the Dubai Museum in the region of Al-Jumayra (Jumeirah) found several artefacts from the Umayyad period.

An early mention of Dubai in 1095 is in the Book of Geography by the Andalusian-Arab geographer Abu Abdullah al-Bakri. The Venetian pearl merchant Gasparo Balbi visited the area in 1580 and mentioned Dubai (as Dibei) for its pearling industry.

=== Establishment of modern Dubai ===
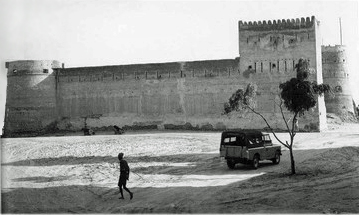
Al Fahidi fort in the 1950s

Dubai is thought to have been established as a pearling and fishing village in the early 18th century and was, by 1822, a town of some 700–800 members of the Bani Yas tribe and subject to the rule of Sheikh Tahnun bin Shakhbut of Abu Dhabi. In 1822, a British naval surveyor noted that Dubai was at that time populated by a thousand people living in an oval-shaped town surrounded by a mud wall, scattered with goats and camels. The main footpath out of the village led to a reedy creek, while another trailed off into the desert and merged into caravan routes.

In 1833, after tribal feuds, members of the Al Bu Falasah tribe seceded from Abu Dhabi and established themselves in Dubai. The exodus from Abu Dhabi was led by Obeid bin Saeed and Maktoum bin Butti, who became joint leaders of Dubai until Ubaid died in 1836, leaving Maktoum to establish the Maktoum dynasty.

Dubai signed the General Maritime Treaty of 1820 with the British government along with other Trucial States, following the British campaign in 1819 against Ras Al Khaimah. This led to the 1853 Perpetual Maritime Truce. Dubai—like its neighbours on the Trucial Coast—entered into an exclusivity agreement in which the United Kingdom took responsibility for the emirate's security in 1892.

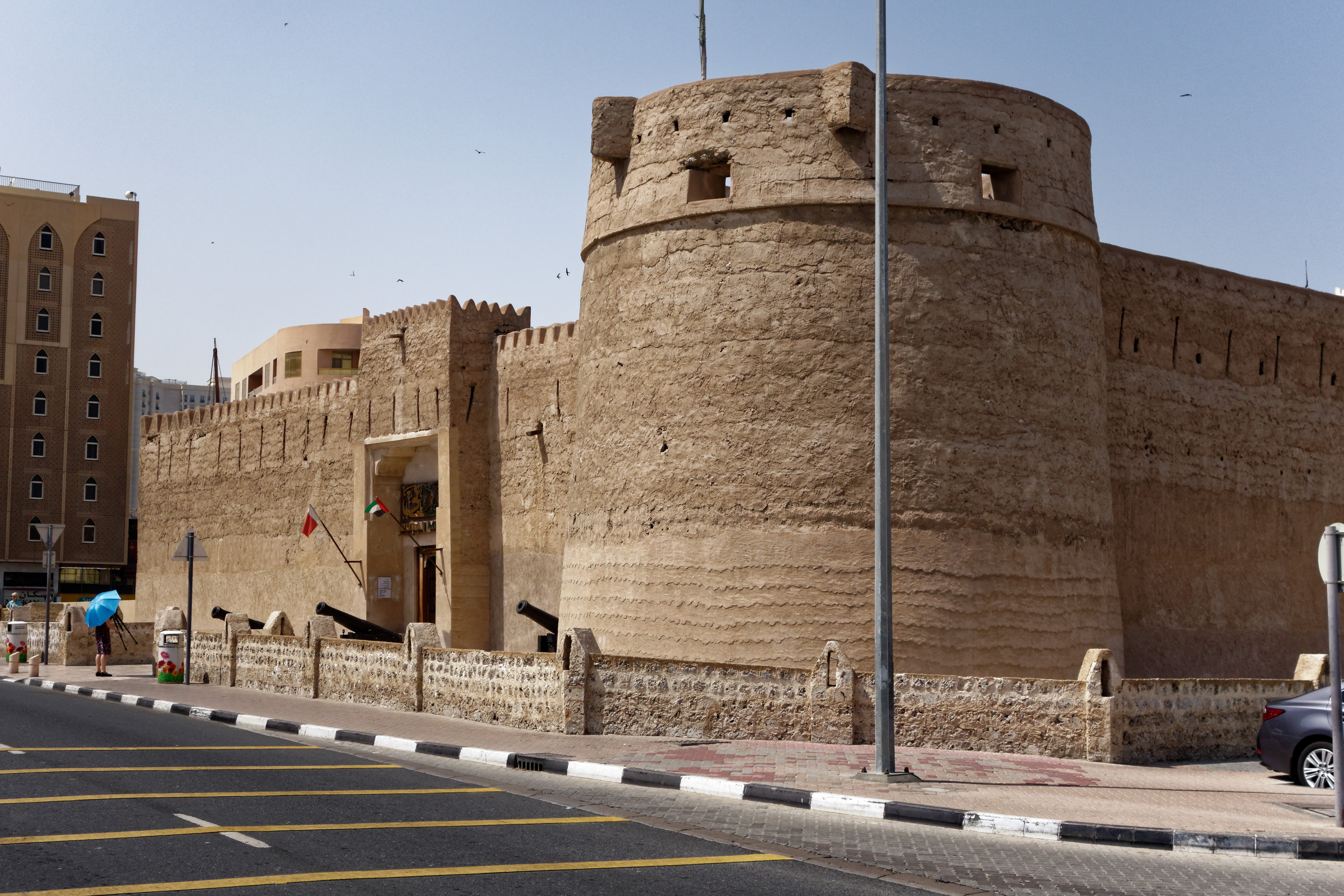
Al Fahidi Fort houses the Dubai Museum.

In 1841, a smallpox epidemic broke out in Bur Dubai, forcing residents to relocate east to Deira. In 1896, fire broke out in Dubai, a disastrous occurrence in a town where many family homes were still constructed from barasti (palm fronds). The conflagration consumed half of Bur Dubai's houses, and the Deira district was said to have been destroyed. The next year, more fires broke out. An enslaved woman was caught in the act of starting one such blaze and was put to death.

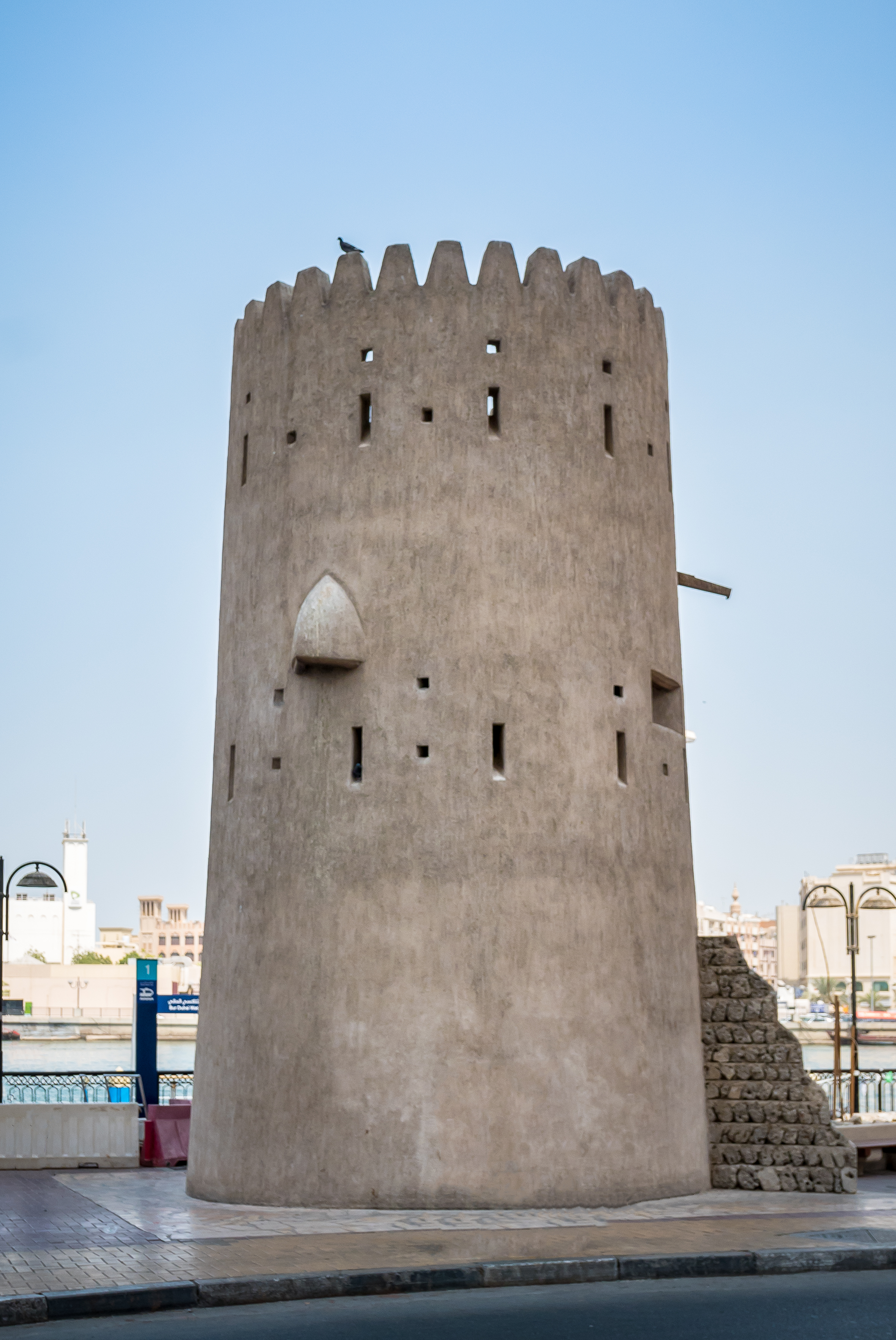
A watchtower in Bur Dubai, c. 19th century

In 1901, Maktoum bin Hasher Al Maktoum established Dubai as a free port with no taxation on imports or exports, and also gave merchants parcels of land and guarantees of protection and tolerance. These policies led merchants not only to move directly from Lingeh, but also from those who had settled in Ras Al Khaimah and Sharjah (which had historical links with Lingeh through the Al Qawasim tribe) to Dubai. An indicator of the growing importance of the port of Dubai is the movements of the steamer of the Bombay and Persia Steam Navigation Company, which from 1899 to 1901 paid five visits annually to Dubai. In 1902, the company's vessels made 21 visits to Dubai, and from 1904 on, the steamers called fortnightly, trading 70,000 tons of cargo in 1906. The frequency of these vessels only accelerated Dubai's role as an emerging port and trading hub of preference. Lorimer notes the transfer from Lingeh "bids fair to become complete and permanent", and also that the town had by 1906 supplanted Lingeh as the chief entrepôt of the Trucial States.

The "Great Storm" of 1908 struck the pearling boats of Dubai and the coastal emirates towards the end of the pearling season that year, resulting in the loss of a dozen boats and over 100 men. The disaster was a major setback for Dubai, with many families losing their breadwinners and merchants facing financial ruin. These losses came at a time when the tribes of the interior were also experiencing poverty. In a letter to the Sultan of Muscat in 1911, Butti laments, "Misery and poverty are raging among them, with the result that they are struggling, looting and killing among themselves."

In 1910, in the Hyacinth incident, the town was bombarded by HMS Hyacinth, with 37 people killed.

=== Pre-oil Dubai ===
As well as expanding its regional trade links, Dubai was also an important regional centre for the collection, sale, and trade of pearls. The collapse of the pearling industry plunged the city into a deep depression, and many residents lived in poverty or migrated to other parts of the Persian Gulf.

In 1937, an oil exploration contract was signed, guaranteeing royalty rights for Dubai and concessionary payments to Sheikh Saeed bin Maktoum. But due to World War II, oil was not struck until 1966.

In its early days, Dubai was constantly at odds with Abu Dhabi. In 1947, a border dispute between Dubai and Abu Dhabi on the northern sector of their border escalated into war. Arbitration by the British government resulted in a cessation of hostilities.

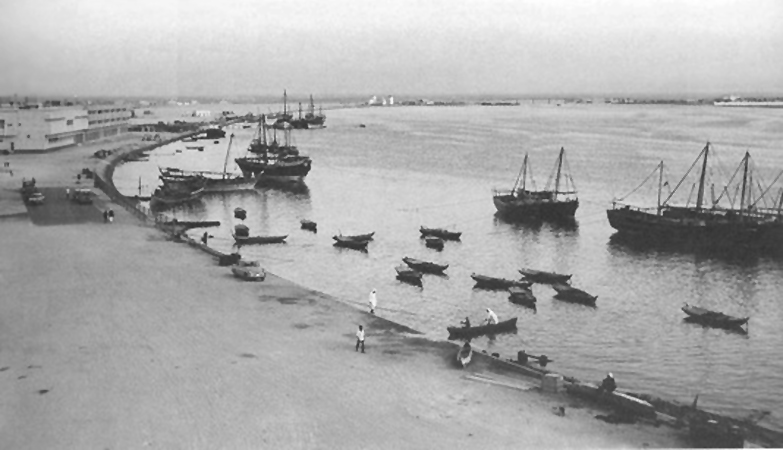
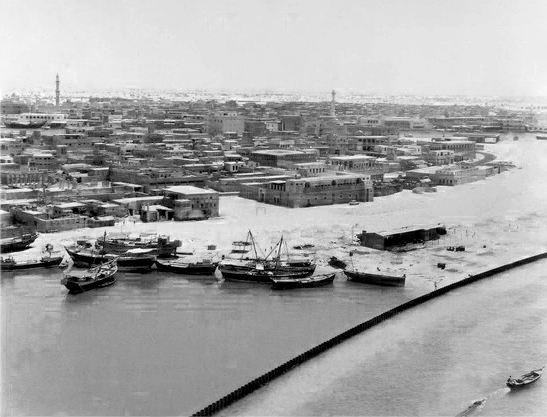
The Al Ras district in Deira and Dubai Creek in the mid-1960s

Despite a lack of oil, Dubai's ruler from 1958, Sheikh Rashid bin Saeed Al Maktoum, used revenue from trading activities to build infrastructure, initially through loans raised from local merchants and the ruler of Kuwait. Private companies were established to build and operate infrastructure, including electricity, telephone services, and both the ports and airport operators. An airport of sorts (a runway built on salt flats) was established in Dubai in the 1950s and in 1959, the emirate's first hotel, the Airlines Hotel, was constructed. This was followed by the Ambassador and Carlton Hotels in 1968.

Throughout the late 1950s, the British had urged Sheikh Rashid to approve a town plan to manage an already burgeoning real estate market. In 1959, through the correspondence of the British political agent, Sheikh Rashid invited architect John Harris to Dubai to discuss the parameters of a town plan. In May 1960, Harris returned to Dubai with the plan. Harris, who ran his own architectural practice, had only a matter of weeks to create the plan after receiving aerial photographs of the city that spring. No later than 1961, the British engineering firm Halcrow was marking the city's street system as shown on the plan and hardening designated routes with asphalt. The plan continued to function as a guide for further extensions of Dubai's street system as municipal funding became available. Harris's plan made only minimal proposals to disrupt the commercial and social life in the existing areas of Bur Dubai and Deira. Therefore, new development was proposed outside these areas, further inland from the Gulf. While the town plan of 1960 envisioned a very low-rise city that was not realised, its proposed road system was largely implemented as planned. Harris's firm acted independently of Halcrow, but the plan's accurate representation of ongoing land reclamation and the future Maktoum Bridge, which had not yet been proposed to the municipality, suggests that the two firms kept an open line of communication. The master plan's road system also served as a guide for the municipality in designating utility easements, as these became increasingly necessary.

In 1959, Dubai's first telephone company was established, with 51% owned by IAL (International Aeradio Ltd) and 49% by Sheikh Rashid and local businesspeople. In 1961, both the electricity and telephone companies rolled out operational networks. The water company (Rashid was chairman and majority shareholder) constructed a pipeline from wells at Awir and a series of storage tanks and, by 1968, Dubai had a reliable supply of piped water. The same year, a sand tax was briefly imposed by Rashid in an effort to boost trade by monetising the Emirate's most abundant resource. The tax was lifted after 11 days, making it the shortest-lived tax in the region's history.

On 7 April 1961, the Dubai-based MV Dara, a five-thousand-ton British-flagged vessel that plied the route between Basra (Iraq), Kuwait, and Bombay (Mumbai, India), was caught in unusually high winds off Dubai. Early the next morning, in heavy seas off Umm al-Quwain, an explosion tore out the second-class cabins and started fires. The captain gave the order to abandon ship, but two lifeboats capsized, and a second explosion occurred. A flotilla of small boats from Dubai, Sharjah, Ajman, and Umm al-Quwain picked up survivors, but 238 of the 819 persons on board were lost in the disaster.

Construction of Dubai's first airport began on the northern edge of the town in 1959, and the terminal building opened for business in September 1960. The airport was initially serviced by Gulf Aviation (flying Dakotas, Herons, and Viscounts) but Iran Air commenced services to Shiraz in 1961.

In 1962, the British Political Agent noted that "Many new houses and blocks of offices and flats are being built... the Ruler is determined, against advice [from the British authorities] to press on with the construction of a jet airport... More and more European and Arab firms are opening up, and the future looks bright."

In 1962, with expenditure on infrastructure projects already approaching levels some thought imprudent, Sheikh Rashid approached his brother-in-law, the Ruler of Qatar, for a loan to build the first bridge crossing Dubai Creek. This crossing was completed in May 1963 and was paid for by a toll levied on traffic from the Dubai side of the creek to Deira.

BOAC was initially reluctant to launch regular flights between Bombay and Dubai, fearing insufficient seat demand. However, by the time the asphalt runway of Dubai Airport was constructed in 1965, opening Dubai to both regional and long-haul traffic, several foreign airlines were competing for landing rights. In 1970, a new airport terminal building was constructed, which included Dubai's first duty-free shops.

Throughout the 1960s, Dubai was the centre of a lively gold trade, with 1968 imports of gold at some £56 million. This gold was, in the vast majority, re-exported – mainly to customers who took delivery in international waters off India. The import of gold to India had been banned, and so the trade was characterised as smuggling. However, Dubai's merchants were quick to point out that they were making legal gold deliveries and that it was up to the customer where they took it.

In 1966, more gold was shipped from London to Dubai than from almost anywhere else in the world (only France and Switzerland shipped more), totaling 4 million ounces. Dubai also took delivery of over $15 million worth of watches and over 5 million ounces of silver. The 1967 price of gold was $35 an ounce, but its market price in India was $68 an ounce – a healthy markup. Estimates at the time put the volume of gold imports from Dubai to India at around 75% of the total market.

=== Oil era ===
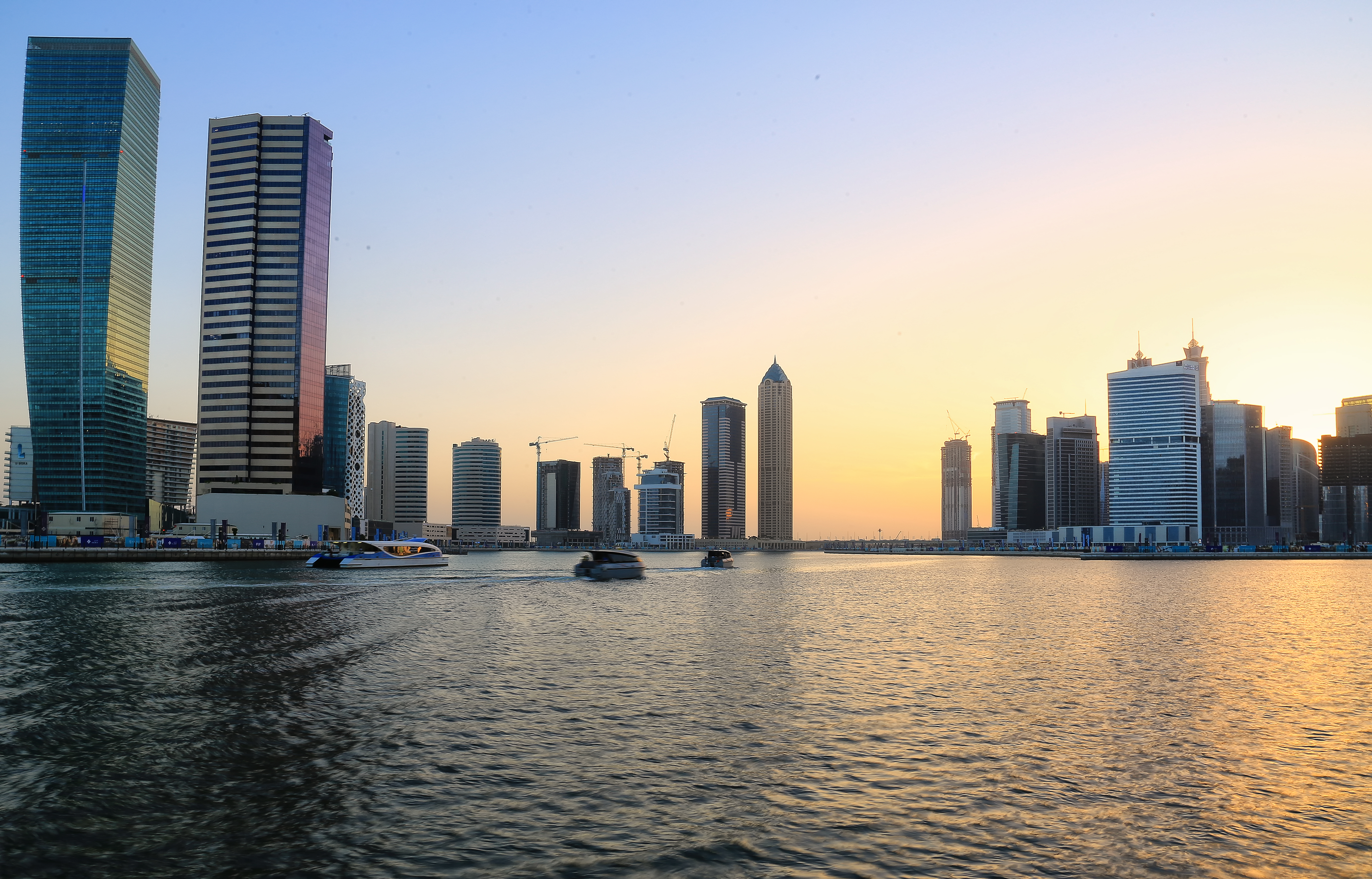
View of Business Bay

After years of exploration following large finds in neighbouring Abu Dhabi, oil was eventually discovered in territorial waters off Dubai in 1966, albeit in far smaller quantities. The first field was named "Fateh" or "good fortune". This accelerated Sheikh Rashid's infrastructure development plans and triggered a construction boom, resulting in a massive influx of foreign workers, primarily from Asia and the Middle East. Between 1968 and 1975, the city's population grew by over 300%.

As part of the infrastructure for pumping and transporting oil from the Fateh field, located offshore of the Jebel Ali area of Dubai, two 500,000-gallon storage tanks were built, known locally as "Kazzans", by welding them together on the beach and then digging them out and floating them to drop onto the seabed at the Fateh field. These were constructed by the Chicago Bridge & Iron Company, which gave the beach its local name (Chicago Beach), which was transferred to the Chicago Beach Hotel, which was demolished and replaced by the Jumeirah Beach Hotel in the late 1990s. The Kazzans were an innovative oil storage solution which meant supertankers could moor offshore even in bad weather and avoided the need to pipe oil onshore from Fateh, which is some 60 miles out to sea.

Dubai had already embarked on a period of infrastructural development and expansion. Oil revenue, flowing from 1969 onwards, supported a period of growth, with Sheikh Rashid embarking on a policy of infrastructure development and economic diversification before the emirate's limited reserves were depleted. Oil accounted for 24% of GDP in 1990 but had fallen to 7% of GDP by 2004.

Critically, one of the first major projects Sheikh Rashid embarked upon when oil revenue began to flow was the construction of Port Rashid, a deep-water free port built by the British company Halcrow. Originally intended to be a four-berth port, it was extended to sixteen berths during construction. The project was an outstanding success, with shipping queuing to access the new facilities. The port was inaugurated on 5 October 1972, although its berths were put to use as soon as they were built. Port Rashid was to be expanded in 1975 by 35 berths before the larger Jebel Ali port was constructed.

Port Rashid was the first of a swath of projects designed to create a modern trading infrastructure, including roads, bridges, schools, and hospitals.

=== Reaching the UAE's Act of Union ===
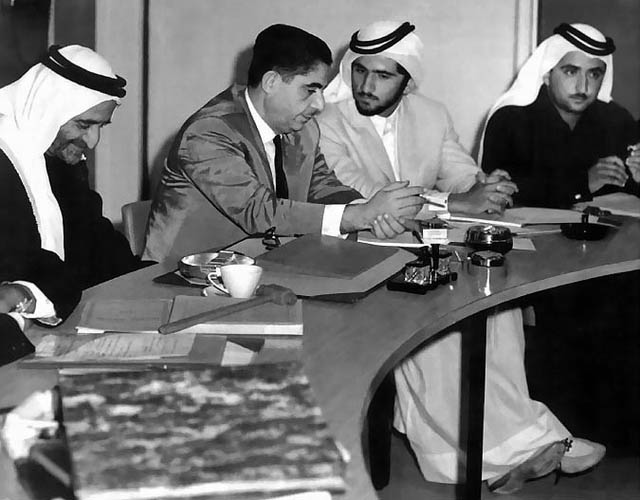
Adi Bitar in a meeting with Sheiks Rashid Al Maktoum, Mohammad Al Maktoum, and Maktoum Al Maktoum in Dubai, 1968

Dubai and the other "Trucial States" had long been a British protectorate where the British government took care of foreign policy and defence, as well as arbitrating between the rulers of the Eastern Gulf, the result of a treaty signed in 1892 named the "Exclusive Agreement". This was to change with Prime Minister Harold Wilson's announcement, on 16 January 1968, that all British troops were to be withdrawn from "East of Aden". The decision was to pitch the coastal emirates, together with Qatar and Bahrain, into fevered negotiations to fill the political vacuum left by the British withdrawal.

The principle of union was first agreed upon between the ruler of Abu Dhabi, Sheikh Zayed bin Sultan Al Nahyan, and Sheikh Rashid of Dubai on 18 February 1968, at a meeting in an encampment at Argoub Al Sedirah, near Al Semeih, a desert stop between the two emirates. The two agreed to work towards bringing the other emirates, including Qatar and Bahrain, into the union. Over the next two years, negotiations and meetings of the rulers followed—often stormy—as a form of union was thrashed out. The nine-state union never recovered from the October 1969 meeting, when British intervention against aggressive actions by two of the Emirates prompted walkouts by Bahrain and Qatar. They dropped out of talks, leaving six of the seven "trucial" emirates to agree on a union on 18 July 1971.

On 2 December 1971, Dubai, together with Abu Dhabi, Sharjah, Ajman, Umm al-Quwain, and Fujairah, joined in the Act of Union to form the United Arab Emirates. The seventh emirate, Ras Al Khaimah, joined the UAE on 10 February 1972, following Iran's annexation of the RAK-claimed Tunbs islands.

In 1973, Dubai, along with the other emirates, adopted a uniform currency: the UAE dirham. In that same year, the prior monetary union with Qatar was dissolved, and the UAE dirham was introduced throughout the Emirates.

=== Modern Dubai ===
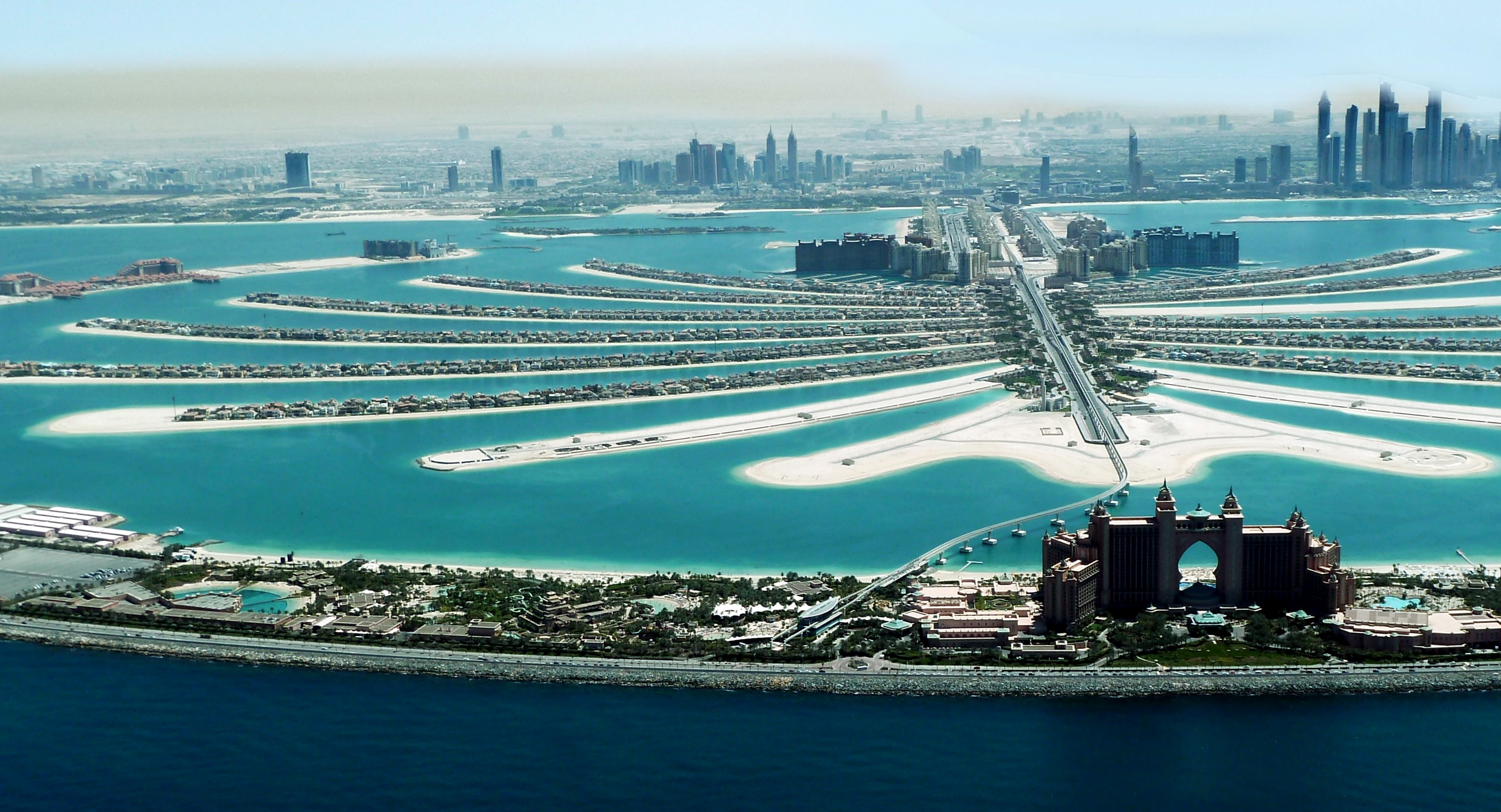
Dubai Palm Jumeirah and Marina in 2011

Throughout the 1970s, Dubai experienced continued growth fuelled by oil and trade revenues, even as the city witnessed an influx of immigrants fleeing the Lebanese civil war. Border disputes between the emirates persisted even after the formation of the UAE; it was only in 1979 that a formal compromise was reached, putting an end to disagreements. In 1979, the establishment of the Jebel Ali port, a deep-water port accommodating larger ships, marked a significant development. Initially facing challenges, Sheikh Mohammed established JAFZA (Jebel Ali Free Zone) around the port in 1985, facilitating the unrestricted import of labour and the export of capital for foreign companies. Simultaneously, Dubai airport and the aviation industry continued their expansion.

The Gulf War in early 1991 had a negative financial impact on the city, as depositors and traders withdrew funds and halted trading. But Dubai rebounded in a changing political climate and prospered. In the late 1990s, various foreign trading communities—initially from Kuwait during the Gulf War and later from Bahrain amid the Shia unrest—relocated to Dubai. Dubai served as a refuelling base for allied forces at the Jebel Ali Free Zone during the Gulf War and again during the 2003 Invasion of Iraq. Subsequent significant increases in oil prices prompted Dubai to maintain its focus on free trade and tourism.

In the early 2000s, construction of artificial islands off Dubai's coast, known as the Palm Islands and The World Islands, began. The Burj Khalifa opened in Dubai in 2010, surpassing the Taipei 101 to become the tallest skyscraper in the world.

Dubai's smart city initiatives, including smart tourism, play a key role in advancing the city's growth ambitions, primarily through the Smart Dubai project. In 2016, the world's first functioning 3D-printed office building was opened in Dubai, having taken 17 days to build. Its architect, Killa Design, was the same architect that designed the Museum of the Future. The construction of Dubai Frame, a 150-meter marvel, commenced in 2014, and was completed in 2017.

During heightened tensions in the Middle East in the 2020s, Dubai's proximity to regional conflict zones led to frequent flight cancellations and heightened security concerns. In retaliation for a series of joint Israeli-American strikes on Iran on 28 February 2026, parts of the city were bombarded by Iranian strikes, including the Fairmont The Palm hotel and the municipal airport.

== Geography ==
This time-lapse video shows the rate of Dubai's growth at one frame per year from 2000 through 2011. In the false-colour satellite images making up the video, the bare desert is tan, plant-covered land is red, water is black, and urban areas are silver.

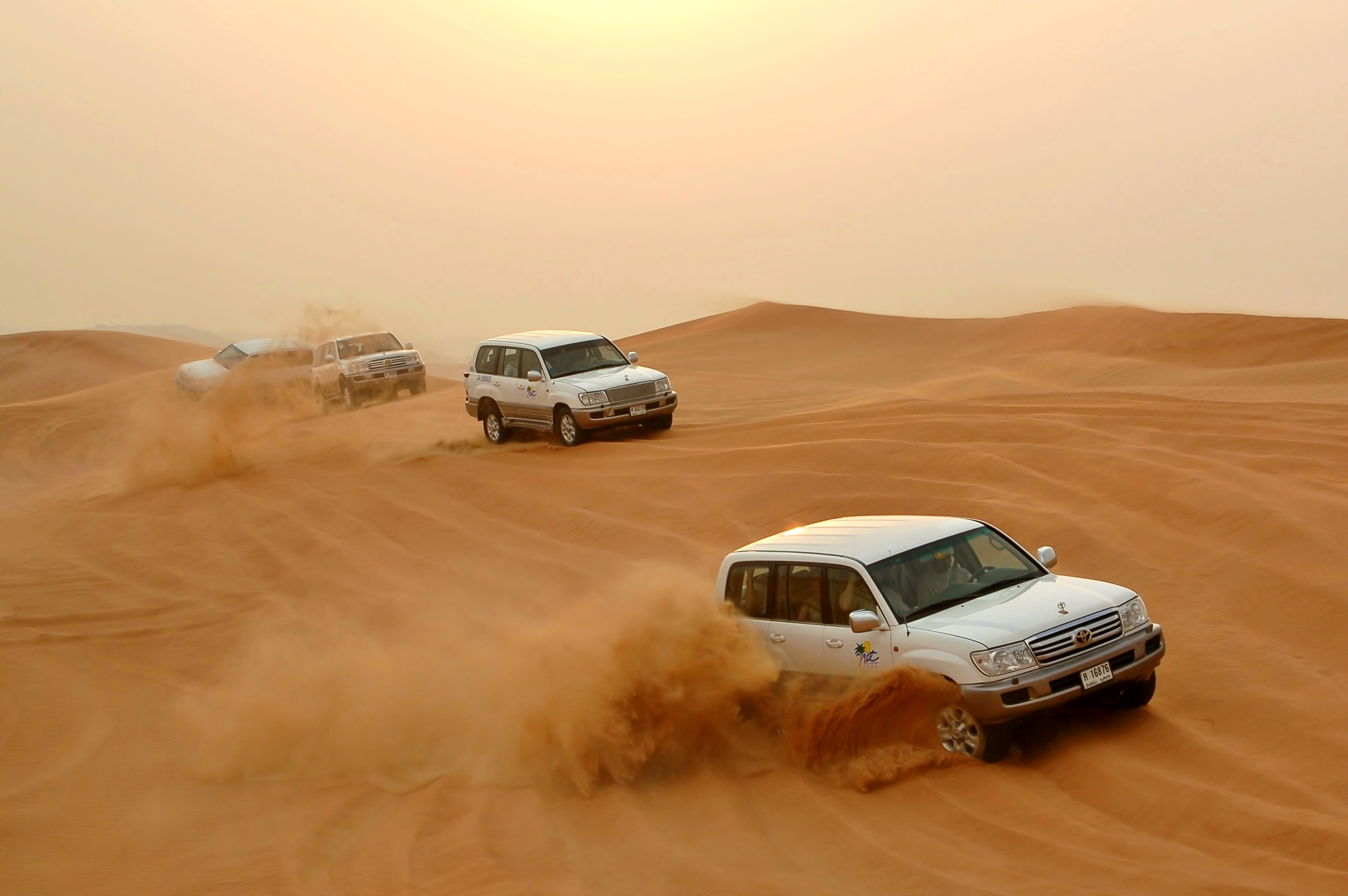
Dune bashing in one of the deserts of Dubai

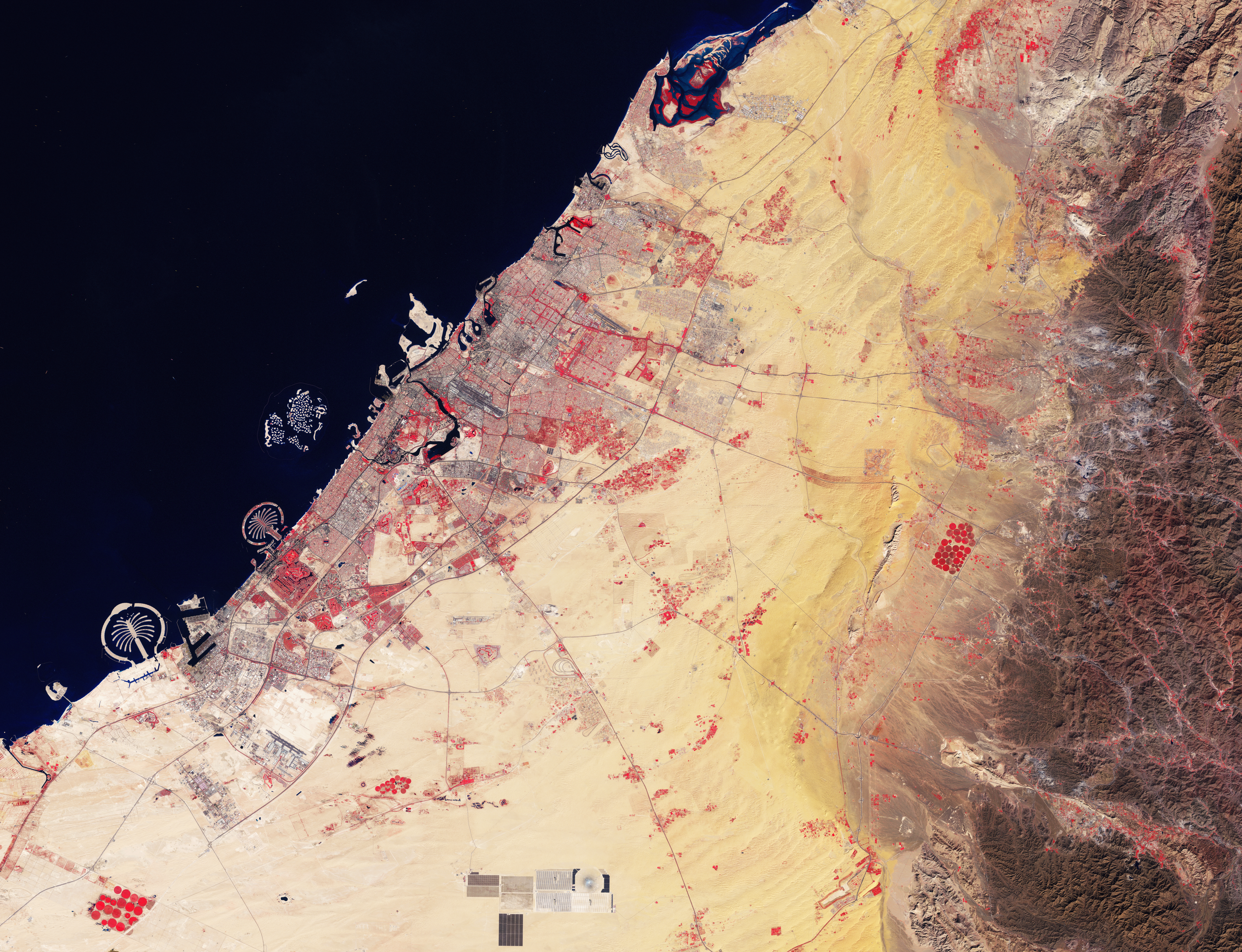
Dubai by Copernicus Sentinel-2 satellite in false-colour in 2024

Dubai is on the Persian Gulf coast of the United Arab Emirates and roughly at sea level (16 m or 52 ft above). The emirate of Dubai borders Abu Dhabi to the south, Sharjah to the northeast, and the Sultanate of Oman to the southeast. Hatta, a minor exclave of the emirate, is surrounded on three sides by Oman and by the emirates of Ajman (in the west) and Ras Al Khaimah (in the north). The Persian Gulf borders the western coast of the emirate. Dubai is positioned at 25.2697°N 55.3095°E and has an area of 1,588 sq mi (4,110 km^{2}), a significant expansion beyond its initial 1,500 sq mi (3,900 km^{2}) designation due to land reclamation from the sea.

Dubai lies directly in the Arabian Desert. Still, its topography differs significantly from that of the southern UAE, with much of Dubai's landscape characterized by sandy desert patterns. In contrast, gravel deserts dominate much of the country's south. The sand consists mostly of crushed shells and coral and is fine, clean, and white. East of the city, the salt-crusted coastal plains, known as sabkha, give way to a north–south running line of dunes. Farther east, the dunes grow larger and are tinged red with iron oxide.

The flat sandy desert gives way to the Western Hajar Mountains, which run alongside Dubai's border with Oman at Hatta. The Western Hajar chain has an arid, jagged, and shattered landscape, whose mountains rise to about 1,300 metres (4,265 feet) in some places. Dubai has no natural rivers or oases, but it does have a natural inlet, Dubai Creek, which has been dredged to allow large vessels to pass. Dubai also has multiple gorges and waterholes dotting the base of the Western Al Hajar mountains. A vast sea of dunes covers much of southern Dubai and leads into the desert known as The Empty Quarter. Seismically, Dubai is in a very stable zone—the nearest seismic fault line, the Zagros Fault, is 200 kilometres (124 miles) from the UAE and unlikely to affect Dubai. Experts also say the probability of a tsunami in the region is minimal because the Persian Gulf waters are not deep enough to trigger one.

The sandy desert surrounding the city supports wild grasses and occasional date palms. Desert hyacinths grow in the sabkha plains east of the city. In contrast, acacia and ghaf trees grow in the flat plains within the proximity of the Western Al Hajar mountains. Several Indigenous trees, such as the date palm and neem, as well as imported trees, such as the eucalyptus and jacaranda, grow in Dubai's natural parks. The MacQueen's bustard, striped hyena, caracal, desert fox, falcon, and Arabian oryx are common in Dubai's desert. Dubai is on the migration path between Europe, Asia, and Africa, and more than 320 migratory bird species pass through it in spring and autumn. The waters of Dubai are home to more than 300 fish species, including the hammour. Marine life off the coast of Dubai includes tropical fish, jellyfish, coral, dugong, dolphins, whales, and sharks. Various types of turtles are also found in the area, including the hawksbill turtle and green turtle, which are listed as endangered species.

=== Climate ===
Dubai features a hot desert climate (Köppen BWh). Summers are extremely hot, prolonged, windy, and humid, with an average high around 40 °C (104 °F) and overnight lows around 30 °C (86 °F) in the hottest month, August. Most days are sunny throughout the year. Winters are mild to warm, with an average high of 24 °C (75 °F) and overnight lows of 14 °C (57 °F) in January, the coolest month.

Dubai summers are also known for very high humidity, which can make them uncomfortable for many, with exceptionally high dew points that can exceed 30 °C (86 °F). Heat index values can reach over 60 °C (140 °F) at the height of summer. The highest recorded temperature in Dubai is 49.0 °C (120.2 °F).

Very dry, Dubai's average annual precipitation is 79.2 mm (3.12 in). But precipitation has been increasing over the last few decades, with annual precipitation reaching 110.7 mm (4.36 in). Record-setting flooding inundated Dubai in April 2024, demonstrating a lack of appropriate drainage to deal with the immense challenges precipitated by climate change.

== Government ==
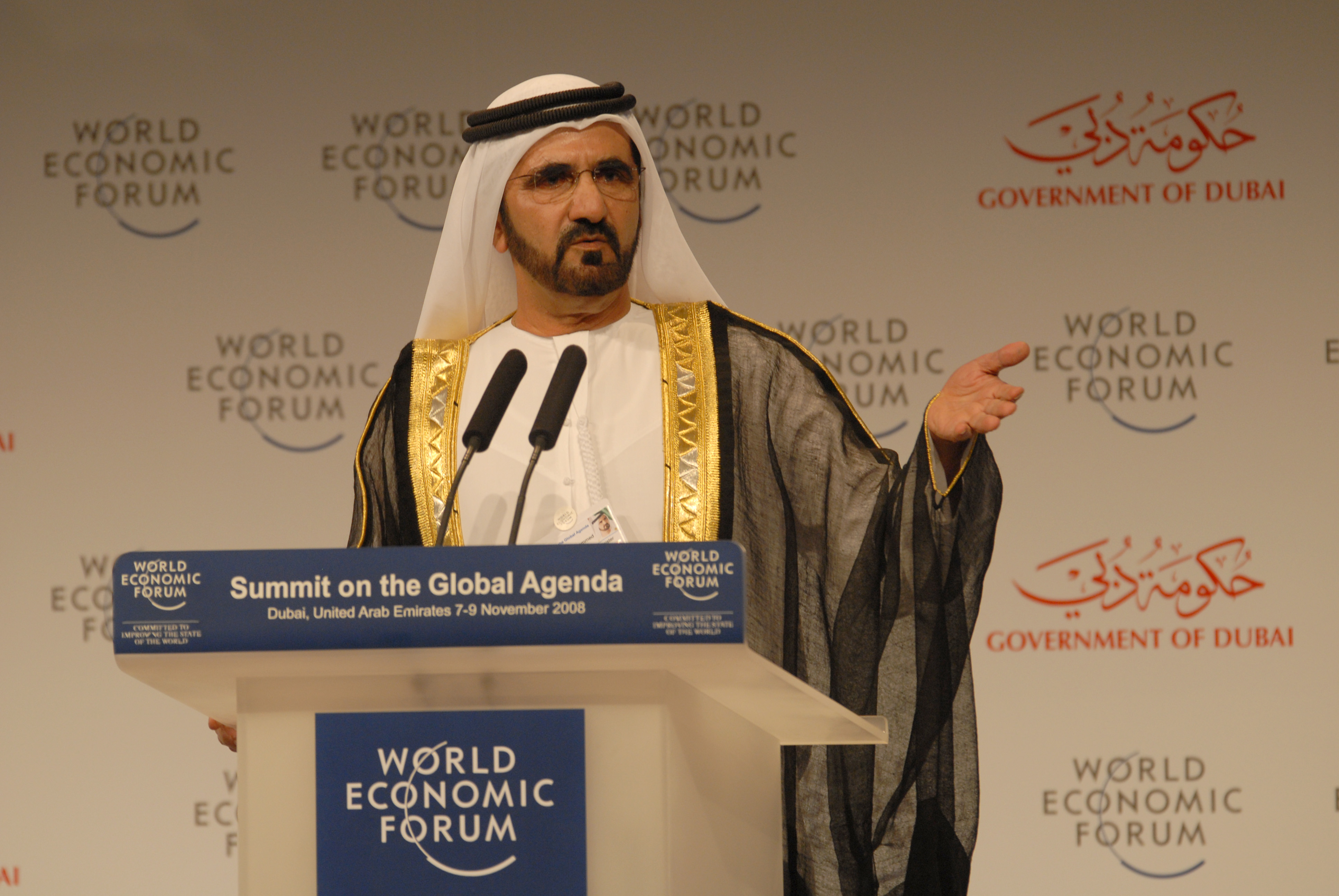
Mohammed bin Rashid Al Maktoum, Prime Minister and Vice President of the United Arab Emirates and the Ruler of Dubai

Dubai has been ruled by the Al Maktoum family since 1833; the emirate is an absolute monarchy. Dubai citizens participate in the electoral college to vote representatives to the Federal National Council of the UAE. The ruler, Sheikh Mohammed bin Rashid Al Maktoum, is also the vice-president and Prime Minister of the United Arab Emirates and a member of the Supreme Council of the Union (SCU). Dubai appoints eight members to the Federal National Council (FNC) of the UAE, the supreme federal legislative body, for two-term periods.

The Dubai Municipality (DM) was established by the then ruler of Dubai, Rashid bin Saeed Al Maktoum, in 1954 for purposes of city planning, citizen services, and upkeep of local facilities. It has since then evolved into an autonomous subnational authority, collectively known as the Government of Dubai, which is responsible for both the city of Dubai and the greater emirate. The Government of Dubai has over 58 governmental departments responsible for security, economic policy, education, transportation, immigration, and is one of only three emirates to have a separate judicial system independent from the federal judiciary of the UAE. The Ruler of Dubai is the head of government and emir (head of state) and laws, decrees, and court judgments are issued in his name, however, since 2003, executive authority of managing and overseeing Dubai Governmental agencies has been delegated to the Dubai Executive Council, led by the Crown Prince of Dubai Hamdan bin Mohammed Al Maktoum. Although no legislative assembly exists, the traditional open majlis (council), where citizens and representatives of the Ruler meet, is often used for feedback on certain domestic issues.

== Demographics ==
Historical population
Year	Pop.	±%
1822	1,200	—
1900	10,000	+733.3%
1930	20,000	+100.0%
1940	38,000	+90.0%
1960	40,000	+5.3%
1968	58,971	+47.4%
1975	183,000	+210.3%
1985	370,800	+102.6%
1995	674,000	+81.8%
2005	1,204,000	+78.6%
2010	1,905,476	+58.3%
2015	2,446,675	+28.4%
2019	3,355,900	+37.2%
c-census; e-estimate

=== Ethnicity and languages ===
As of September 2019, the population is 3,331,420 –an annual increase of 177,020 people, which represents a growth rate of 5.64%. The region covers 1,287.5 square kilometres (497.1 mi^{2}). The population density is 408.18/km^{2} –more than eight times that of the entire country. Dubai is the second-most-expensive city in the region and the 20th-most-expensive city in the world.

As of 2013, only about 15% of the emirate's population was made up of UAE nationals, with the rest comprising expatriates, many of whom either have been in the country for generations or were born in the UAE. Approximately 85% of the expatriate population (and 71% of the emirate's total population) was Asian, chiefly Indian (51%) and Pakistani (16%); other significant Asian groups include Bangladeshis (9%) and Filipinos (3%). A quarter of the population (local and foreign) reportedly traces their origins to Iran. In addition, 16% of the population (or 288,000 persons) living in collective labour accommodation were not identified by ethnicity or nationality, but were thought to be primarily Asian. Some 461,000 Westerners live in the United Arab Emirates, making up 5.1% of its total population. There are over 100,000 British expatriates in Dubai, by far the largest group of Western expatriates in the city. The median age in the emirate was about 27 years. In 2014, there were estimated to be 15.54 births and 1.99 deaths per 1,000 people. There are other Arab nationals, including GCC nationals.

Arabic is the national and official language of the UAE. The Gulf dialect of Arabic is spoken natively by most Emiratis; some Emiratis also speak Shihhi Arabic. English is used as a second language. Other major languages spoken in Dubai due to immigration are Malayalam, Sindhi, Gujarati, Urdu, Persian, Hindi, Tamil, Punjabi, Pashto, Bengali, Balochi, Tulu, Kannada, Sinhala, Marathi, Telugu, Tagalog, and Chinese, in addition to many others.

=== Religion ===
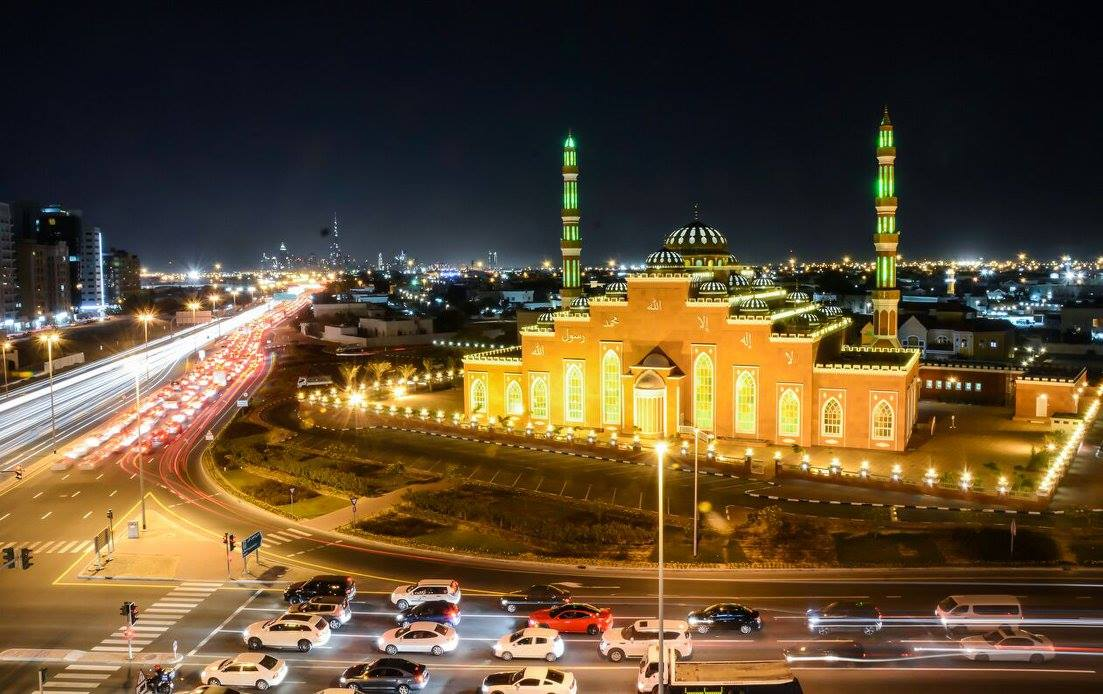
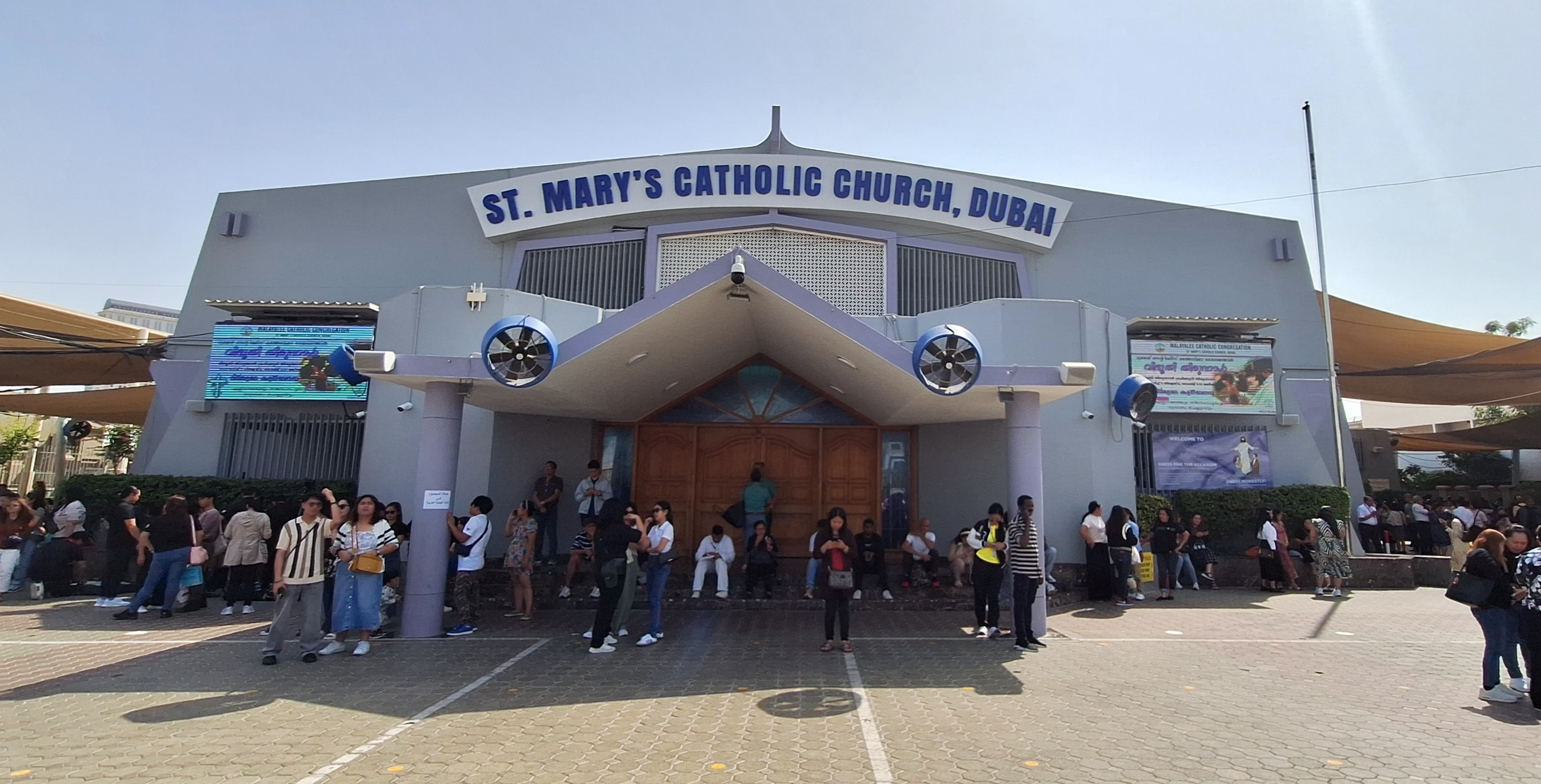
Al Salam Mosque in Al Barsha and St. Mary's Catholic Church, Dubai

Article 7 of the UAE's Provisional Constitution declares Islam the official state religion of the UAE. The government subsidises almost 95% of mosques and employs all Imams; approximately 5% of mosques are entirely private, and several large mosques have large private endowments. All mosques in Dubai are managed by the Islamic Affairs and Charitable Activities Department, also known as "Awqaf", under the Government of Dubai. The Government appoints all Imams. The Constitution of the United Arab Emirates provides for freedom of religion. Expats held to be preaching religious hatred or promoting religious extremism are usually jailed and deported.

Religion in Dubai (2014)
Religion	Percent
Islam	56%
Christian	25%
Hindu	16%
Others	2%

Dubai has large Christian, Hindu, Sikh, Baháʼí, Buddhist, Jain and other religious communities residing in the city, as well as a small but growing Jewish community. In 2014, more than 56% of Dubai residents were Muslims, while 25% were Christians, 16% were Hindus, and around 2% were adherent of other religions. The Churches Complex in Jebel Ali Village is an area for several churches and temples of different religious denominations, especially Christian denominations. The largest Christian parish in the world is that of St Mary's Catholic Church in Dubai, owing to the large number of migrant workers in the city.

Non-Muslim groups may own houses of worship where they can practice their religion freely, provided they obtain a land grant and permission to build a compound. Groups that do not have their own buildings may use facilities provided by other religious organisations or worship in private homes. Non-Muslim religious groups are also permitted to advertise group functions openly and distribute various religious literature. Catholics are served pastorally by the Apostolic Vicariate of Southern Arabia. British preacher Reverend Andrew Thompson claimed that the United Arab Emirates is one of the most tolerant places in the world towards Christians and that it is easier to be a Christian in the UAE than in the UK. On 5 April 2020, the Church of Jesus Christ of Latter-day Saints announced the building of one of their temples in Dubai. As part of the announcement, church President Russell M. Nelson said, "The plan for a temple in Dubai comes in response to their gracious invitation, which we gratefully acknowledge."

== Economy ==
Burj Khalifa and Downtown Dubai

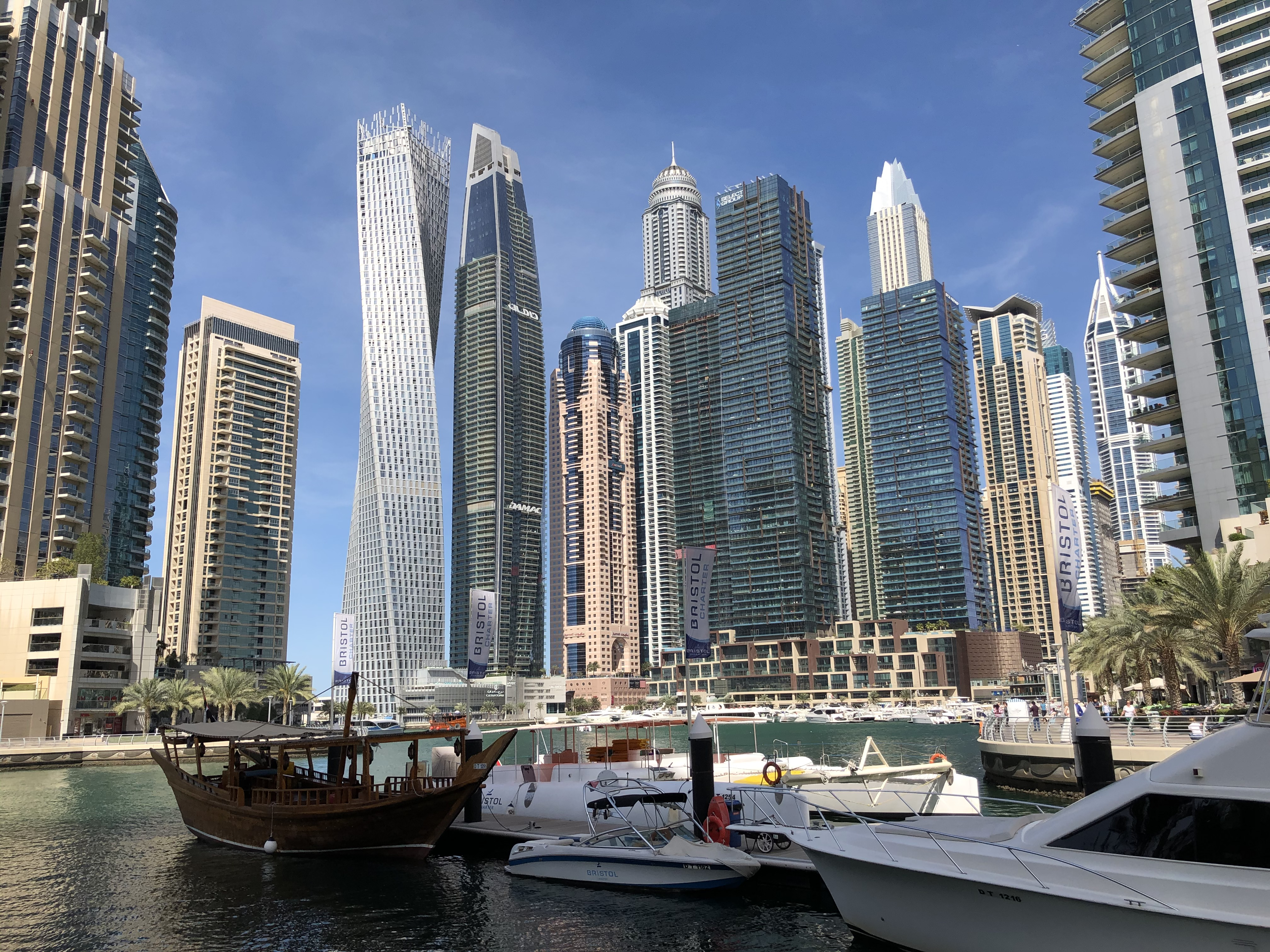
Dubai Marina

One of the world's fastest-growing economies, Dubai's gross domestic product is projected at over US$177 billion in 2021, with a growth rate of 6.1% in 2014. Although a number of core elements of Dubai's trading infrastructure were built on the back of the oil industry, revenues from oil and natural gas account for less than 5% of the emirate's revenues. It is estimated that Dubai produces 50,000 to 70,000 barrels (7,900 to 11,100 m^{3}) of oil a day and substantial quantities of gas from offshore fields. The emirate's share in the UAE's total gas revenues is about 2%. Dubai's oil reserves have diminished significantly and are expected to be exhausted in 20 years. Real estate and construction (22.6%), trade (16%), entrepôt (15%), and financial services (11%) are the largest contributors to Dubai's economy.

Dubai's non-oil foreign trade stood at $362 billion in 2014. Of the total trade volume, imports accounted for the largest share at $230 billion, while exports and re-exports to the emirate totaled $31 billion and $101 billion, respectively.

By 2014, China had emerged as Dubai's largest international trading partner, with total trade of $47.7 billion, up 29% from 2013. India was second among Dubai's key trading partners, with trade totaling $29.7 billion, followed by the United States at $22.62 billion. The Kingdom of Saudi Arabia was Dubai's fourth-largest trading partner globally and its first in the GCC and the Arab world, with a total trade value of $14.2 billion. Trade with Germany in 2014 totalled $12.3 billion; Switzerland and Japan both at $11.72 billion; and the UK at $10.9 billion.

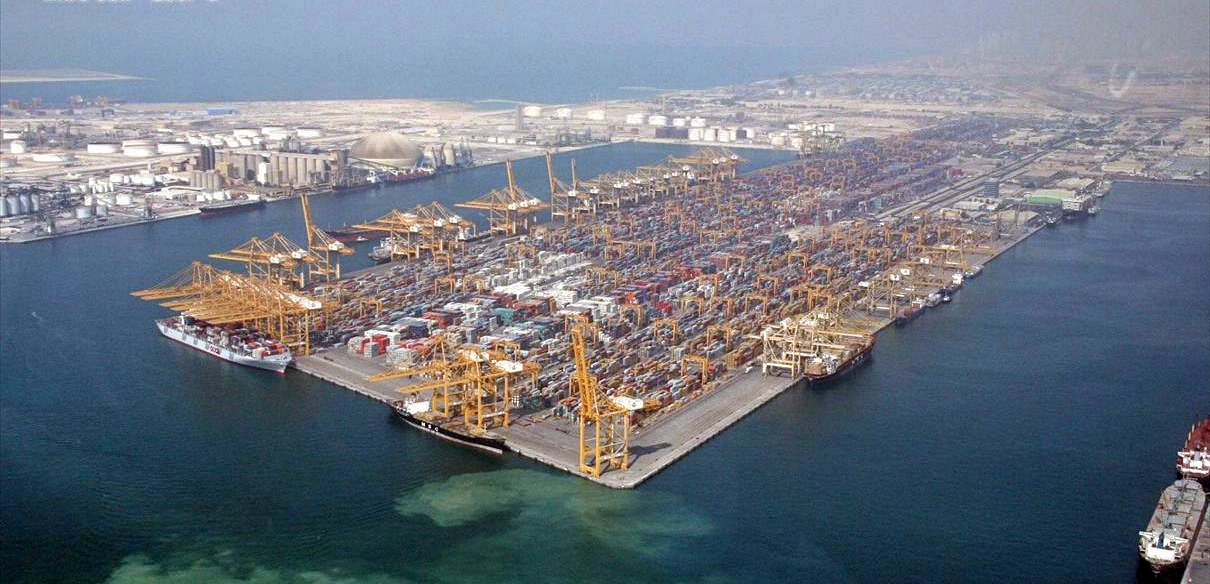
Port of Jebel Ali

Historically, Dubai and its twin across Dubai Creek, Deira (then independent of Dubai City), were important ports of call for Western manufacturers. Most of the new city's banking and financial centres were headquartered in the port area. Dubai remained a major trade hub throughout the 1970s and 1980s. Dubai has a free trade in gold and, until the 1990s, was the hub of a "brisk smuggling trade" of gold ingots to India, where gold import was restricted. Dubai's Jebel Ali port, constructed in the 1970s, has the largest human-made harbour in the world and was ranked seventh globally for the volume of container traffic it supports. Dubai is also a hub for service industries such as information technology and finance, with industry-specific free zones throughout the city. Dubai Internet City, combined with Dubai Media City as part of TECOM (Dubai Technology, Electronic Commerce and Media Free Zone Authority), is one such enclave, whose members include IT firms such as Hewlett Packard Enterprise, HP Inc., Halliburton, Google, EMC Corporation, Oracle Corporation, Microsoft, Dell, and IBM, and media organisations such as MBC, CNN, BBC, Reuters, Sky News, and AP. Various programmes, resources, and value-added services support the growth of startups in Dubai and help them connect to new business opportunities.

National Bank of Dubai

The Dubai Financial Market (DFM) was established in 2000 as a secondary market for trading securities and bonds, both local and foreign. As of the fourth quarter of 2006, its trading volume stood at about 400 billion shares, valued at $95 billion. The DFM had a market capitalisation of about $87 billion. The other Dubai-based stock exchange is NASDAQ Dubai, the Middle East's international stock exchange. It enables a range of companies, including UAE and regional small and medium-sized enterprises, to trade on an exchange with an international brand name, with access to both regional and international investors.

DMCC (Dubai Multi Commodities Centre) was established in 2002. It is the world's fastest-growing free zone and was nominated for "Global Free Zone of the Year 2016" by The Financial Times Magazine.

Dubai is also known as the City of Gold because a major part of the economy is based on gold trading, with Dubai's total gold trading volumes in H1 2011 reaching 580 tonnes at an average price of US$1,455 per troy ounce.

A City Mayors survey ranked Dubai 44th among the world's best financial cities in 2007, while another report by City Mayors indicated that Dubai was the world's 27th richest city in 2012, in terms of purchasing power parity (PPP). Dubai is also an international financial centre (IFC) and has been ranked 37th within the top 50 global financial cities as surveyed by the MasterCard Worldwide Centres of Commerce Index (2007), and first within the Middle East. Since it opened in September 2004, the Dubai IFC has attracted leading international firms as a regional hub and has established NASDAQ Dubai, which lists equity, derivatives, structured products, Islamic bonds (sukuk), and other bonds. The Dubai IFC model is an independent risk-based regulator with a legislative system consistent with English common law.

In 2012, the Global City Competitiveness Index by the Economist Intelligence Unit ranked Dubai at No. 40 with a total score of 55.9. According to its 2013 research report on the future competitiveness of cities, Dubai will rank 23rd overall in the Index in 2025. Indians, followed by Britons and Pakistanis are the top foreign investors in Dubai real estate.

Dubai has launched several major projects to support its economy and develop different sectors. These include Dubai Fashion 2020 and Dubai Design District, which is expected to become a home to leading local and international designers. The AED 4 billion first phase of the project was completed in 2015.

As of March 2024, Dubai began operating the world's biggest waste-to-energy facility, which will power approximately 135,000 homes.

In July 2024, Dubai signed an agreement to develop a logistics hub for food, fruits, and vegetables, planned to be the world's largest of its kind. UAE Minister of Finance Sheikh Maktoum bin Mohammed was present at the signing.

In 2024, the city of Dubai ranked 12 out of 142 cities in the Smart City Index.

=== Real estate and property ===
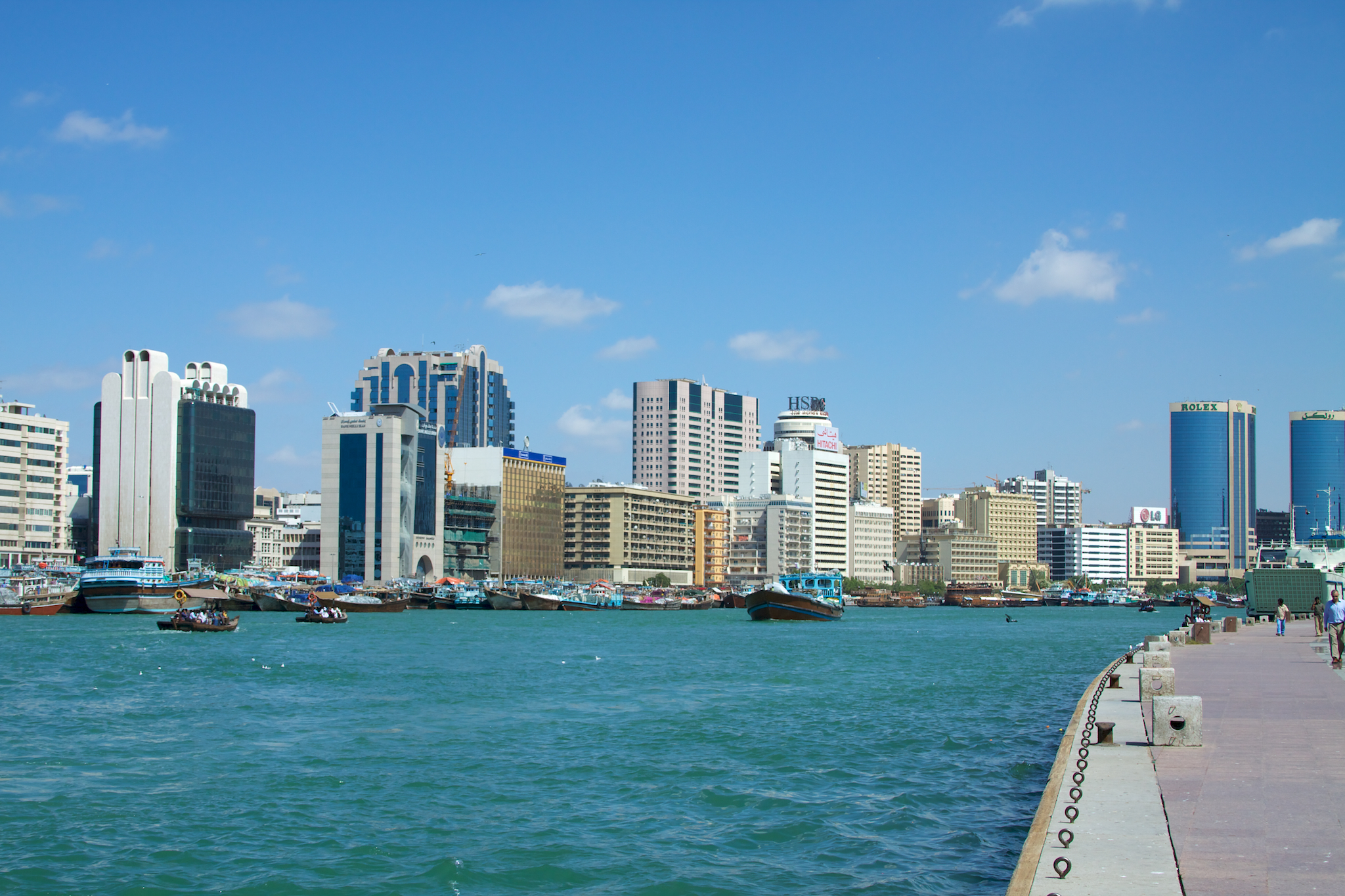
Dubai Creek, which separates Deira from Bur Dubai, played a vital role in the economic development of the city.

In September 2019, Dubai's ruler Sheikh Mohammed bin Rashid Al Maktoum ordered the establishment of the Higher Committee for Real Estate Planning to study and evaluate future real estate construction projects, in order to achieve a balance between supply and demand, which is seen as a move to curb the pace of construction projects following a decline in property prices.

The government's decision to diversify from a trade-based, oil-reliant economy to one oriented toward services and tourism increased property value, driving property appreciation from 2004 to 2006. A longer-term assessment of Dubai's property market, however, showed depreciation; some properties lost as much as 64% of their value from 2001 to November 2008. The large-scale real estate development projects have led to the construction of some of the tallest skyscrapers and largest projects in the world such as the Emirates Towers, the Burj Khalifa, the Palm Islands, and the most expensive hotel, the Burj Al Arab. Dubai's property market experienced a major downturn in 2008 and 2009 as a result of the slowing economic climate. By early 2009, the situation had worsened with the Great Recession taking a heavy toll on property values, construction, and employment. This has had a major impact on property investors in the region, some of whom were unable to release funds from investments made in property developments. As of February 2009, Dubai's foreign debt was estimated at $80 billion. However, this is a tiny fraction of the world's sovereign debt.

In Dubai, many of the property owners are residents or genuine investors. However, 2020 Data from the Centre for Advanced Defense Studies (C4ADS) revealed that several real estate owners in the city were either subject to international sanctions or involved in criminal activities. Some others were public officials, with little likelihood of purchasing it with their known incomes. The report "Dubai Uncovered" names 100 Russian oligarchs, public officials, and Europeans involved in money laundering. Benefiting from Dubai's lack of robust real estate regulations, several corrupt individuals owned properties abroad, laundered illicit funds, and invested in real estate to store their wealth. Names of some of such questionable figures included Daniel Kinahan, Alexander Borodai, Roman Lyabikhov, Tibor Bokor, Ruslan Baisarov, Miroslav Výboh, and others.

For years, Dubai has been labeled a major hub for illicit cash laundering, primarily through its real estate market. Due to the UAE's lack of robust regulations and extradition treaties with many countries, fugitives have found it a perfect hideout. The "Dubai Unlocked" investigation by journalists from 75 media outlets, in coordination with OCCRP and E24, revealed how Dubai's real estate market became a haven for criminals, money launderers, drug lords, fugitives, political figures accused of corruption, and sanctioned individuals seeking to hide their money there. The investigation was based on data leaks from 2020 and 2022, primarily from the Dubai Land Department and publicly owned utility companies. The EU Tax Observatory and Norway's Centre for Tax Research estimated that, in 2022, foreign ownership of real estate in Dubai was approximately $160 billion. Until 2022, there was no obligation for real estate agents, brokers, and lawyers in Dubai to report large cash or cryptocurrency transactions to authorities.

Following the February 2022 invasion of Ukraine, property prices in Dubai rose sharply as wealthy Russians began investing in the UAE's real estate market. Since 2020, property prices in Dubai have increased by 124%. Meanwhile, the EU Tax Observatory and Norway's Centre for Tax Research reported that Russians have invested around $6.3 billion in Dubai's existing and under-development properties since 2022. The increase in property prices pushed out the British expatriates, and forced them to look for property outside Dubai in cities like Ras Al Khaimah.

Despite rising property prices, real estate transactions in Dubai reached an all-time high in 2024, totaling 180,987 and worth AED 522.5bn. This marks a 36.5% increase in transaction volume since 2023.

Between January and August 2026, Dubai recorded 2,046 high value residential rental contracts worth AED 1 million or more. the total value of these contracts reached AED 6.79 billion, with a median yearly rent of AED 1.35 million. About 70% of the contracts were for new leases, while 30% were renewals.

=== Tourism and retail ===
Hotel Atlantis in Dubai

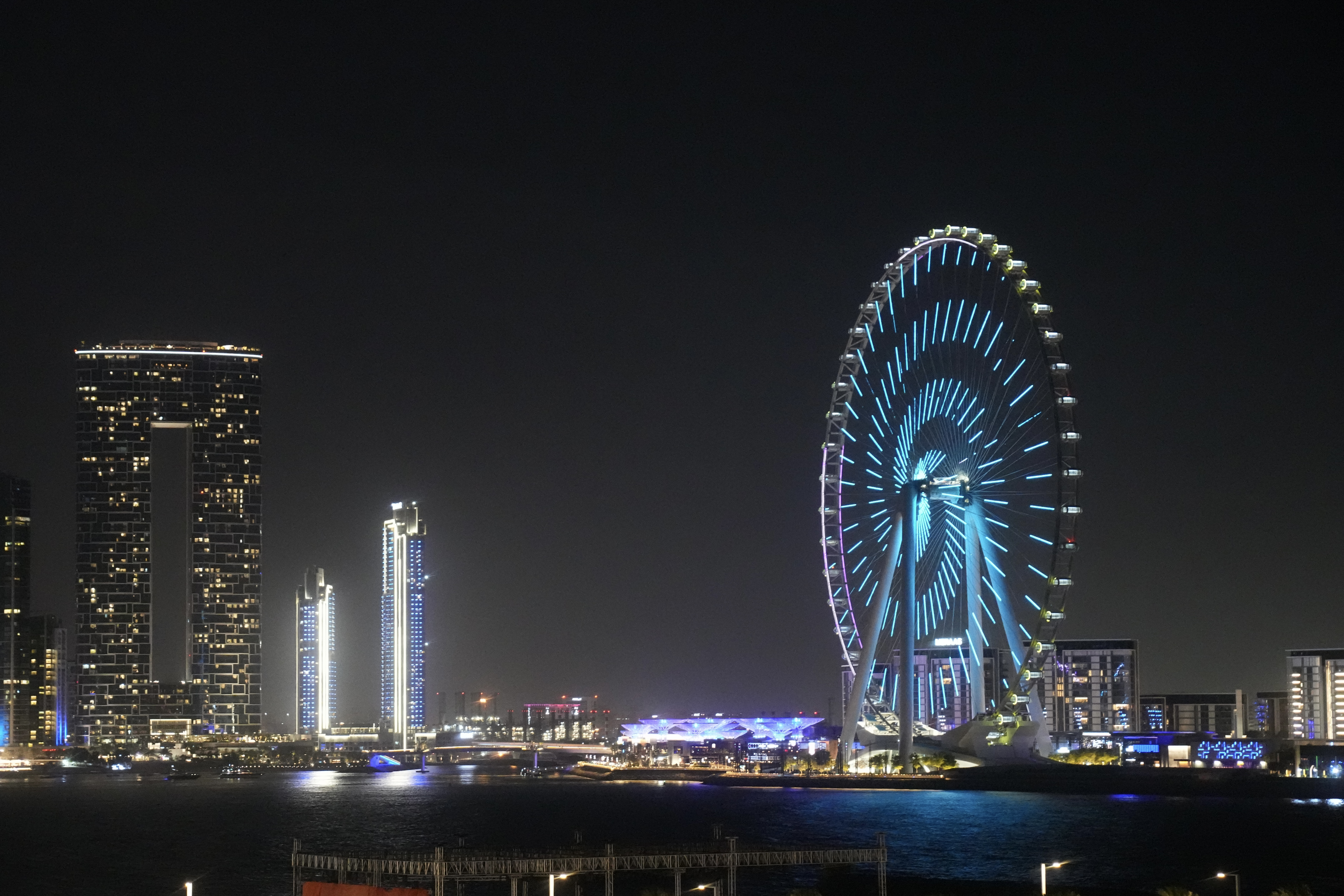
Ain Dubai

Tourism is an essential part of the Dubai government's strategy to maintain the flow of foreign cash. Dubai's lure for tourists is based mainly on shopping, but also on its ancient and modern attractions. As of 2018, Dubai is the fourth-most-visited city in the world based on the number of international visitors and the fastest growing, increasing at a 10.7% rate. The city hosted 14.9 million overnight visitors in 2016 and was expected to reach 20 million tourists by 2020. A great tourist attraction in Dubai is the Burj Khalifa, the tallest building in the world, although Jeddah Tower in Jeddah, Saudi Arabia is aiming to be taller.

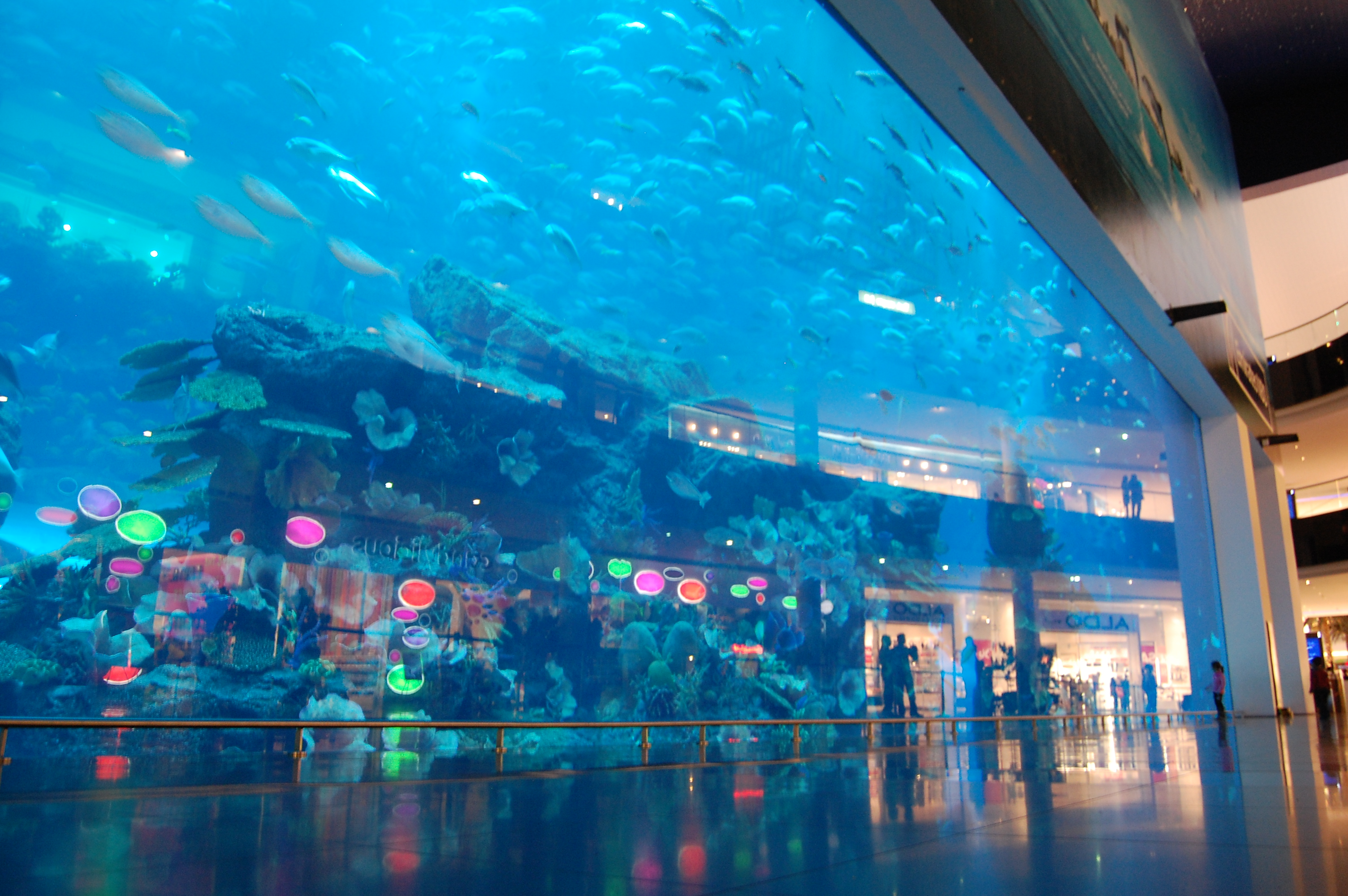
The Dubai Mall Aquarium

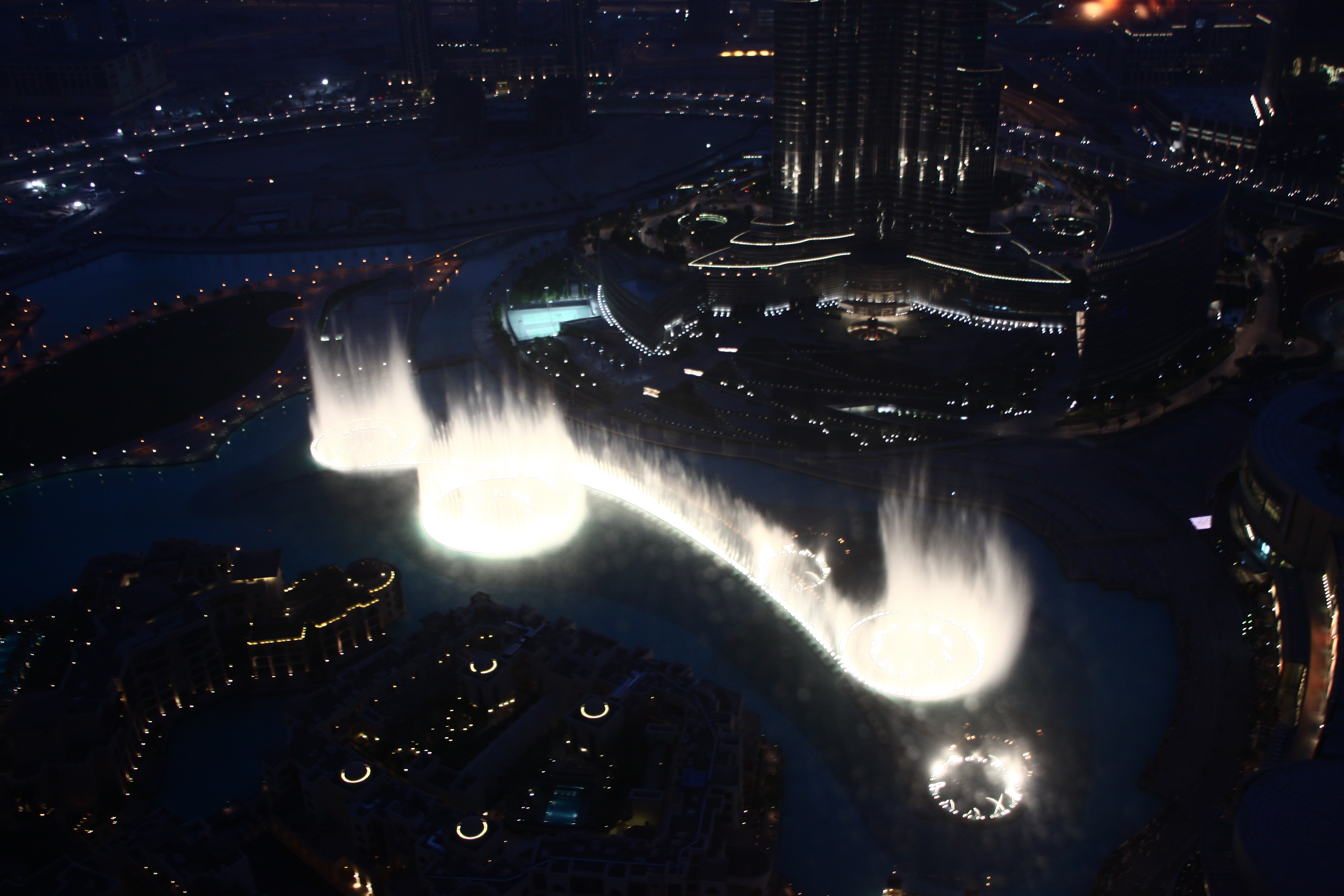
The Dubai Fountain in Burj Khalifa lake, Downtown Dubai

Dubai has been called the "shopping capital of the Middle East". Dubai alone has more than 70 shopping centres, including the world's second-largest shopping centre, The Dubai Mall. As of June 2024, the Emirate real estate developer Emaar Properties announced plans to expand the 12-million-square-foot mall for 1.5 billion dirhams ($408 million), adding 240 luxury stores, along with new food outlets. Dubai is also known for the historical souk districts on either side of its creek. Traditionally, dhows from East Asia, China, Sri Lanka, and India discharged their cargo, and the goods would be bargained over in the souks adjacent to the docks. Dubai Creek played a vital role in sustaining the city's community life and was the resource that originally drove Dubai's economic boom. As of September 2013, Dubai Creek has been proposed as a UNESCO World Heritage Site. Many boutiques and jeweler stores are in the city. Dubai is also known as "the City of Gold", as the Gold Souk in Deira houses nearly 250 gold retail shops.

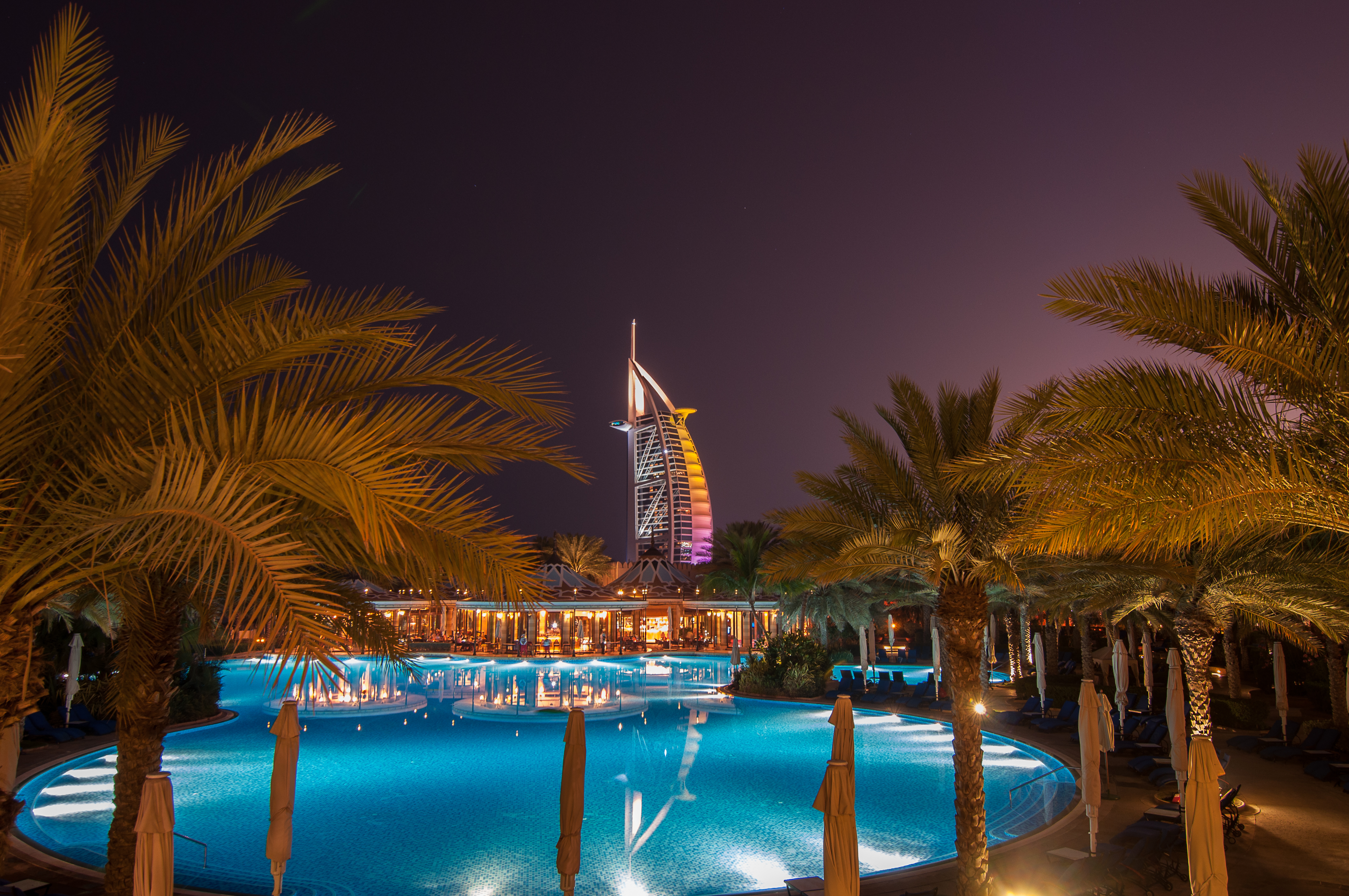
View of the Palm Jumeirah and Burj Al Arab

Dubai Creek Park in Dubai Creek also plays a vital role in Dubai tourism as it showcases some of the most famous tourist attractions in Dubai such as the Dolphinarium, Cable Car, Camel Ride, Horse Carriage, and Exotic Birds Shows.

Dubai has a wide range of parks like Safa Park, Mushrif Park, and Hamriya Park. Each is uniquely distinctive. Mushrif Park showcases different houses from around the world. A visitor can view the architectural features of both the exterior and interior of each home.

Some of the most popular beaches in Dubai are Umm Suqeim Beach, Al Mamzar Beach Park, JBR Open Beach, Kite Beach, Black Palace Beach, and Royal Island Beach Club. Mastercard's Global Destination Cities Index 2019 found that tourists spend more in Dubai than in any other city. In 2018, the country topped the list for the fourth consecutive year, with total spend of $30.82 billion. The average daily spend was $553.

In 2019, Dubai loosened its liquor laws, allowing tourists to purchase alcohol from state-controlled stores. Previously, alcohol was accessible only to locals with special licences. The policy shift came as the United Arab Emirates witnessed a severe economic crisis that led to a drop in alcohol sales by volume.

In 2021, the UAE was ranked among the 20 most dangerous places for LGBTQ tourists to visit. In 2022, several LGBTQ tourists who travelled to Dubai were deported. In March 2022, Thai transgender model Rachaya Noppakaroon visited Dubai to perform at the Expo 2020, but was sent back because her passport gave her sex as male. In another case, a French influencer on TikTok and Snapchat, Ibrahim Godin, was sent back from Dubai because the authorities assumed his male friend travelling with him was his boyfriend. Ibrahim filed a complaint for "public defamation because of sexual orientation", and an investigation was opened by the Vesoul police. He said, "Dubai is not all pretty, all rosy as we see on social networks."

=== Expo 2020 ===
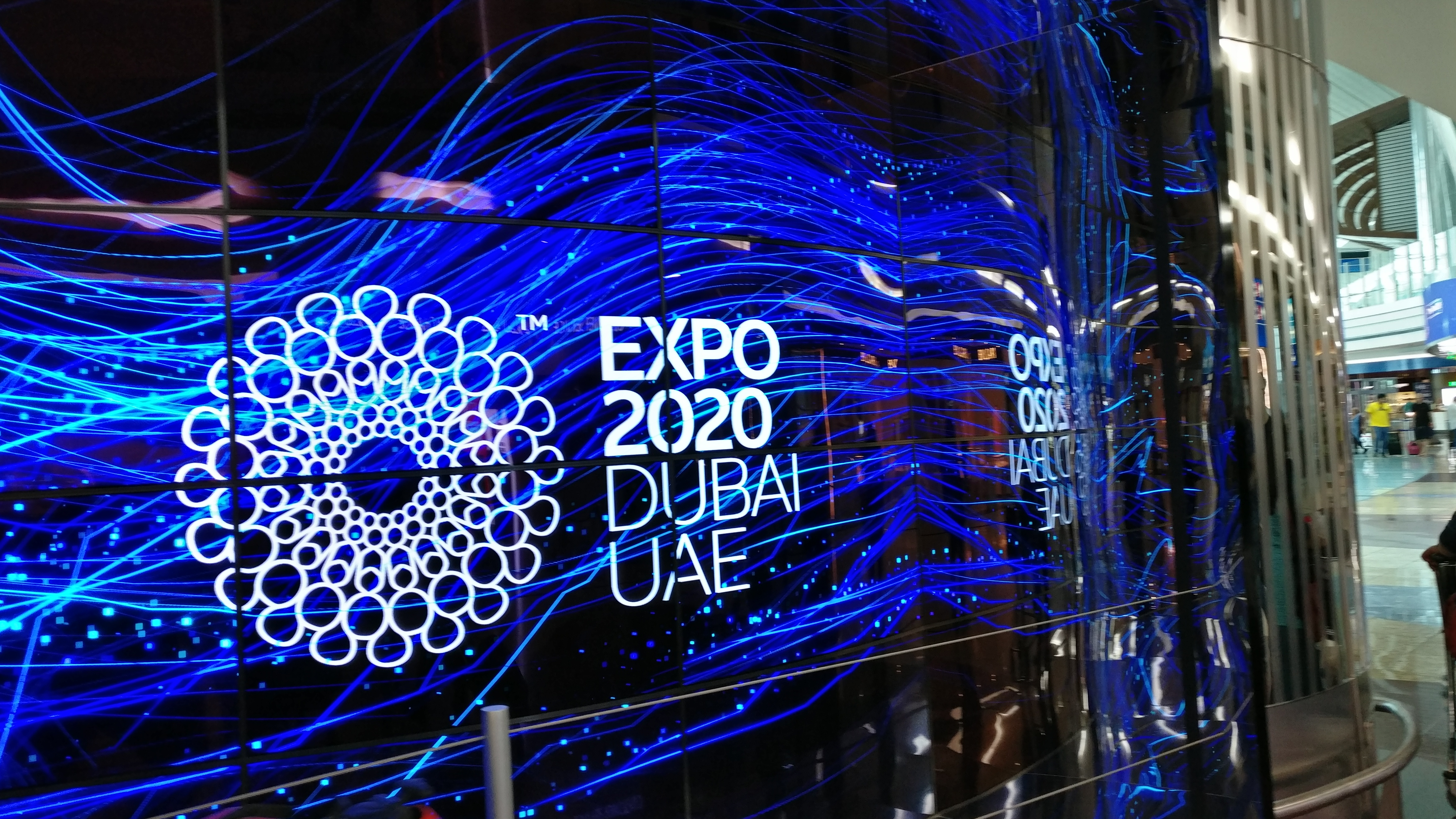
Sign of Expo 2020 Dubai UAE at Dubai International Airport

On 2 November 2011, four cities had their bids for Expo 2020 already lodged, with Dubai making a last-minute entry. The delegation from the Bureau International des Expositions, which visited Dubai in February 2013 to examine its readiness for the largest exposition, was impressed by the infrastructure and level of national support. In May 2013, the Dubai Expo 2020 Master Plan was revealed. Dubai won the right to host Expo 2020 on 27 November 2013.

The leading site of Dubai Expo 2020 was planned to be a 438-hectare area (1,083 acres), part of the new Dubai Trade Centre Jebel Ali urban development, located midway between Dubai and Abu Dhabi. Moreover, the Expo 2020 also created various social enlistment projects and monetary boons to the city targeting the year 2020, such as initiating the world's largest solar power project.

The Dubai Expo 2020 was scheduled to take place from 20 October 2020 until 10 April 2021 for 173 days where there would be 192 country pavilions featuring narratives from every part of the globe, have different thematic districts that would promote learning the wildlife in the forest exhibit too many other experiences.

Due to the impact of COVID-19, the organisers of Expo 2020 postponed the Expo by one year to begin in 2021 (the new dates are 1 October 2021 to 31 March 2022).

Dubai has targets to build an inclusive, barrier-free, and disability-friendly city, which opened as Expo City Dubai. The city has already implemented changes, including wheelchair-accessible taxis, sloped pavements, and tactile floor indicators at all metro stations for visually impaired passengers.

== Architecture ==
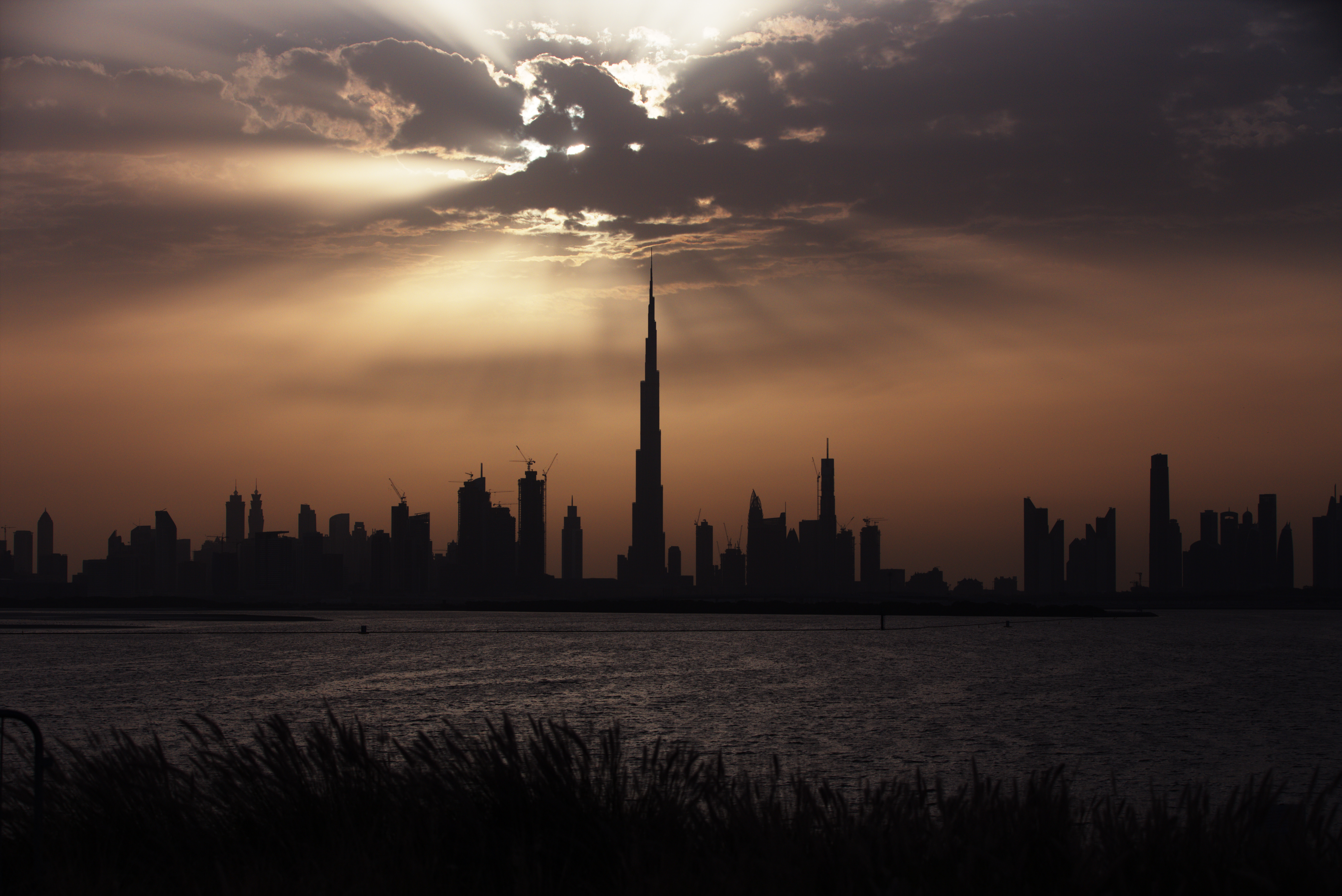
Photographic silhouette of the Downtown Dubai's skyline; Burj Khalifa, the world's tallest building, is visible at the center

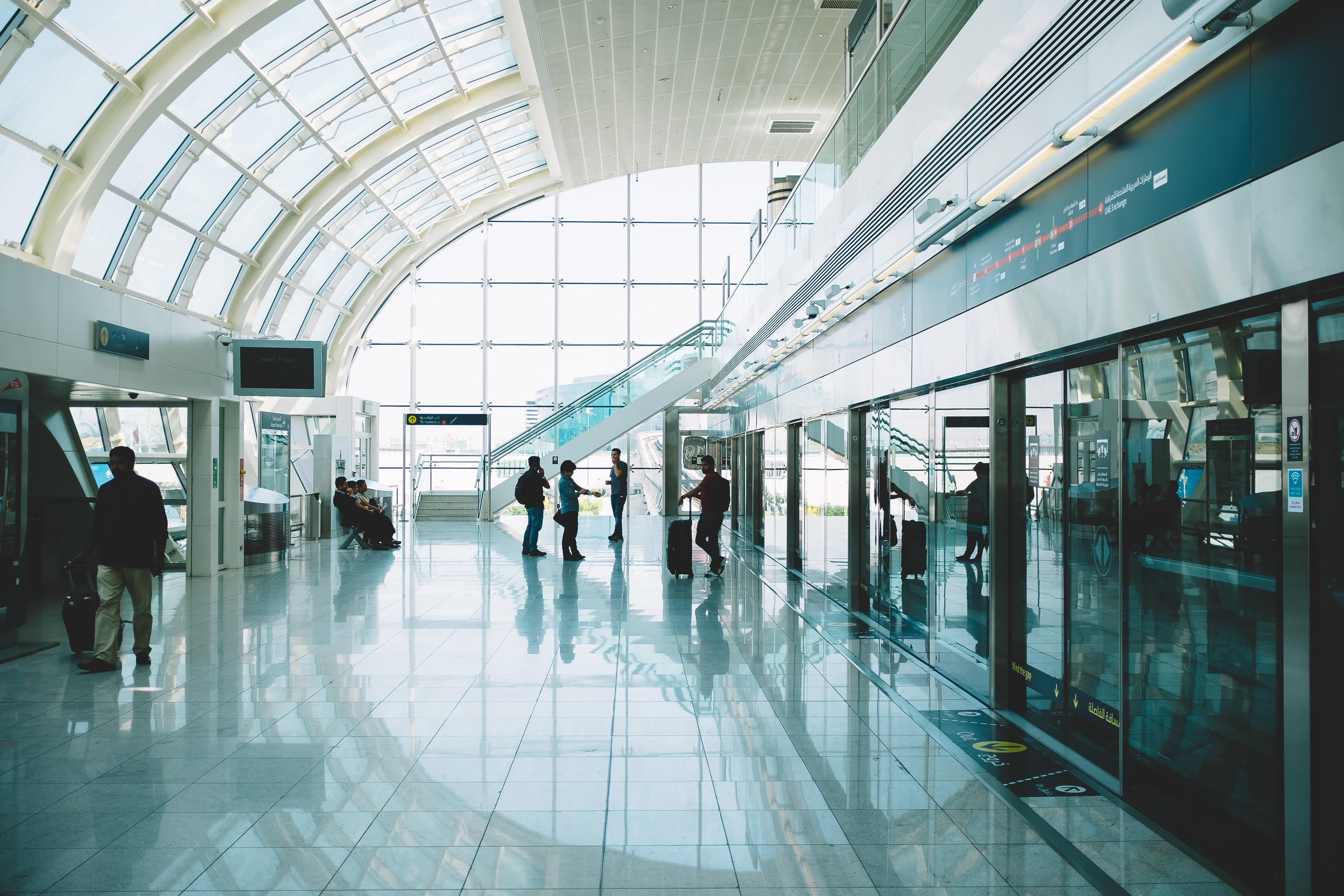
Interior of a Dubai Metro station

Museum of the Future

Dubai has a rich collection of buildings and structures of various architectural styles. Many modern interpretations of Islamic architecture are found here, due to a boom in construction and architectural innovation in the Arab World in general, and in Dubai in particular, supported not only by top Arab or international architectural and engineering design firms such as Al Hashemi and Aedas, but also by top firms of New York and Chicago. As a result of this boom, modern Islamic – and world – architecture has literally been taken to new levels in skyscraper building design and technology. Dubai now has more completed or topped-out skyscrapers higher than 2/3 km (2,200 ft), 1/3 km (1,100 ft), or 1/4 km (820 ft) than any other city. A culmination point was reached in 2010 with the completion of the Burj Khalifa (Khalifa Tower), now by far the world's tallest building at 829.8 m (2,722 ft). The Burj Khalifa's design is derived from the patterning systems embodied in Islamic architecture, with the triple-lobed footprint of the building based on an abstracted version of the desert flower hymenocallis which is native to the Dubai region.

The completion of the Burj Khalifa, following the construction boom that began in the 1980s, accelerated in the 1990s and reached a rapid pace during the 2000s, leaving Dubai with the world's tallest skyline as of 4 January 2010. At The Top in Burj Khalifa, the world's second highest observatory deck after the Shanghai Tower with an outdoor terrace, is one of Dubai's most popular tourist attractions, with over 1.87 million visitors in 2013.

The Creek Tower had been planned in the 2010s to keep Dubai atop the list of tallest buildings. However, construction was placed on indefinite hold during the coronavirus pandemic. No date has been announced for the project's continuation. Dubai is recognised as a "Design City" by UNESCO's Creative Cities Network.

=== Burj Al Arab ===
The Burj Al Arab (Arabic: برج العرب, Tower of the Arabs), a luxury hotel, is frequently called "the world's only 7-star", though its management has never made that claim. The term "7-star hotel" was coined by a British journalist to describe their experience of the hotel. A Jumeirah Group spokesperson said: "There's not a lot we can do to stop it. We're not encouraging the use of the term. We've never used it in our advertising." The hotel opened in December 1999.

=== Burj Khalifa ===
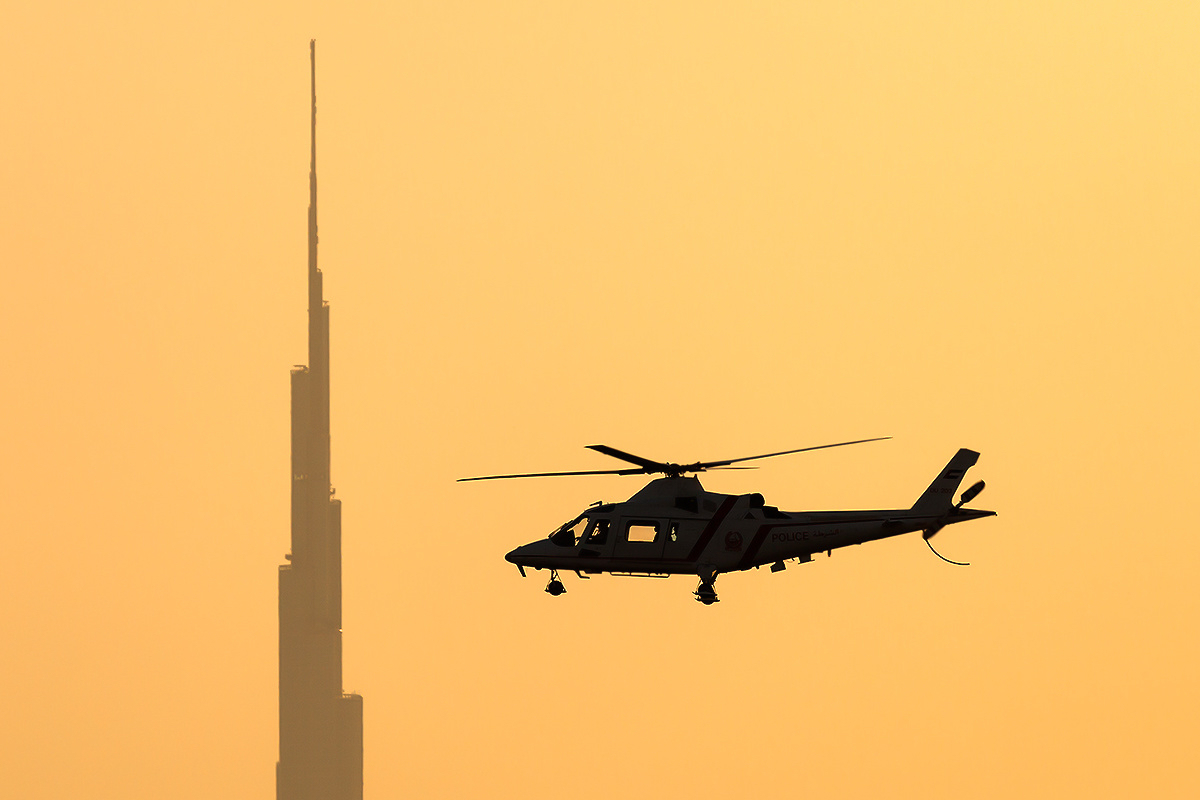
Dubai Police Agusta A-109K-2 in flight near Burj Khalifa

Burj Khalifa, known as the Burj Dubai before its inauguration, is a 828 metres (2,717 ft) high skyscraper in Dubai, and the tallest building in the world. The structure of the desert flower inspired the tower Hymenocallis. It was constructed by more than 30 contracting companies worldwide, with workers from 100 nationalities, from 2004 to 2009. It is also an architectural icon, named after Sheikh Khalifa bin Zayed Al Nahyan. The building opened on 4 January 2010.

=== Palm Jumeirah ===
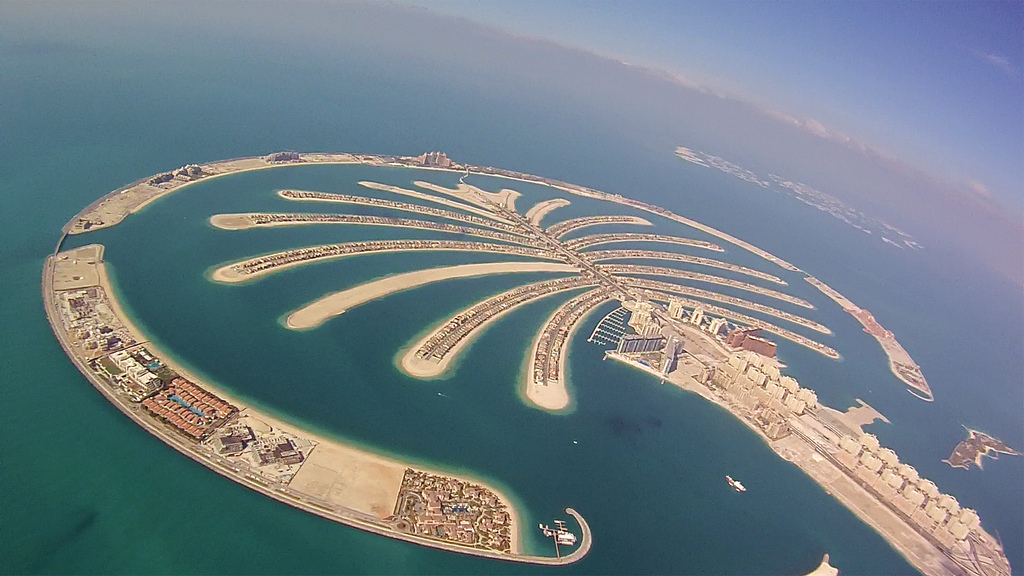
The Palm Jumeirah

The Palm Jumeirah is an artificial archipelago, created using land reclamation by Nakheel Properties, a company owned by the Dubai government, and designed and developed by Helman Hurley Charvat Peacock/Architects, Inc. It is one of three planned islands, the Palm Islands, which extend into the Persian Gulf. The Palm Jumeirah is the smallest and the original of the three Palm Islands, and is in the Jumeirah coastal area. It was built from 2001 to 2006.

=== The World Islands ===
The World Islands is an archipelago of small artificial islands shaped like a world map in the waters of the Persian Gulf, 4.0 kilometres (2.5 mi) off the coast of Dubai. The World islands are mainly made of sand dredged from Dubai's shallow coastal waters and are one of several artificial island developments in Dubai. The islands' areas vary from 250,000 to 900,000 square feet. The islands are arranged in a world map shape, and the archipelago spans about 9 km.

=== Dubai Miracle Garden ===
On 14 February 2013, the Dubai Miracle Garden, a 72,000-metre (236,000-foot) flower garden, opened in Dubailand. It is the world's largest flower garden. The garden displays more than 50 million flowers with more than 70 species of flowering plants. The garden uses treated wastewater from the city's municipality and utilises the drip irrigation method for watering the plants. During the summer seasons from late May to September, when the climate can get extremely hot with an average high of about 40 °C (104 °F), the garden stays closed.

=== Aeternitas Tower ===
In January 2024, Dubai announced its intention to build the Aeternitas Tower, which will become the world's tallest residential clock tower at a height of 450 m (1,480 ft). That is four times the height of London's Big Ben. The tallest clock tower to date is Makkah Clock Royal Tower in Mecca. The tower's name, "Aeternitas", comes from the ancient Roman religion; she was the divine personification of eternity. The project is a joint venture between Dubai-based real estate developer London Gate and Swiss luxury watch manufacturer Franck Muller. The tower offers luxury apartments, including 1 to 4-bedroom units, as well as Sky Villas and Sky Mansions, with interiors inspired by Franck Muller's designs.

=== Dubai Marina ===
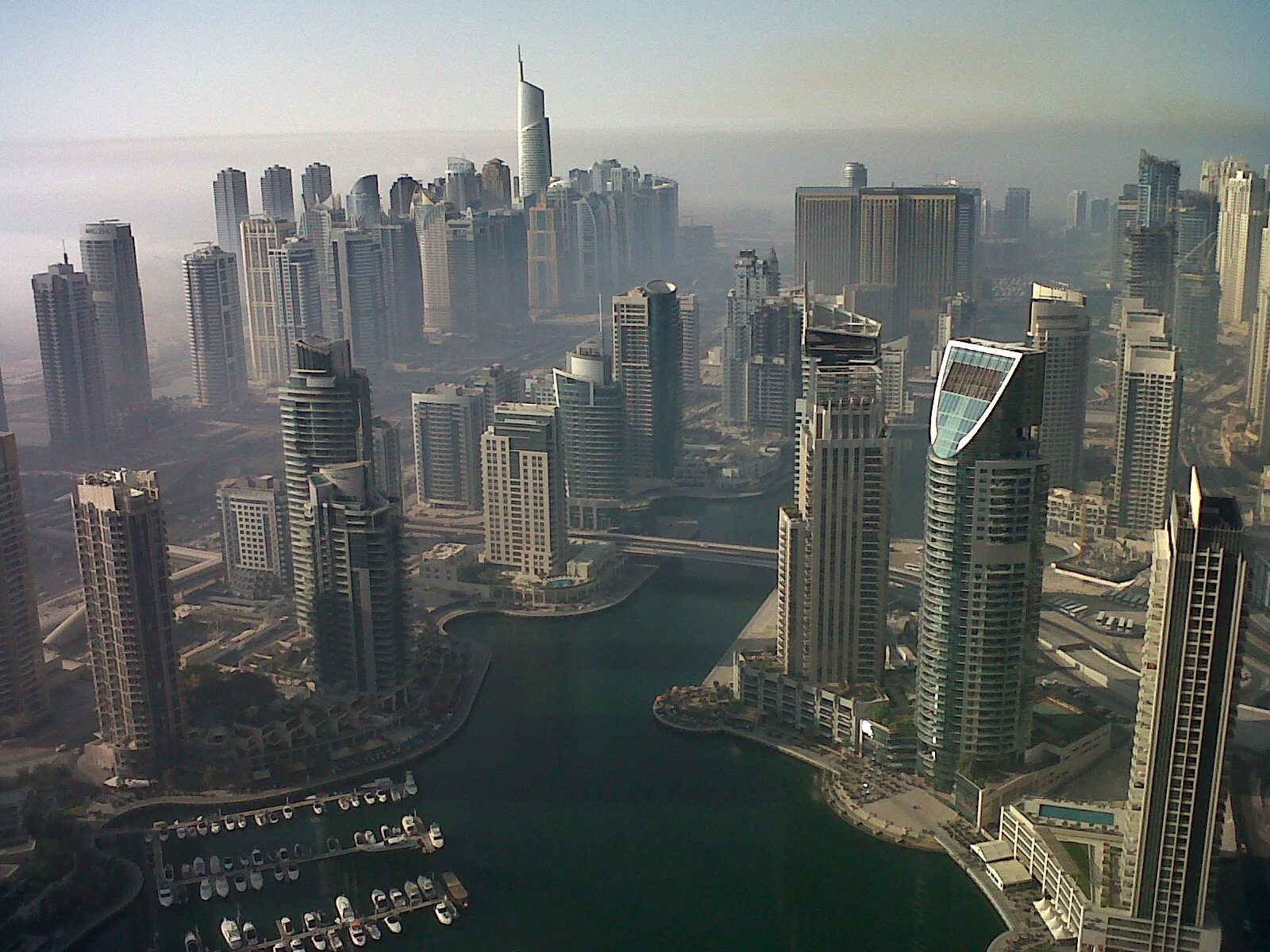
Dubai Marina

Dubai Marina is an artificial canal city, built along a 3-kilometre (2 mi) stretch of Persian Gulf shoreline. As of 2018, it had a population of 55,052. When the entire development is complete, it will accommodate more than 120,000 people in residential towers and villas. The 50 million square feet area of the Dubai Marina boasts a centrepiece that includes a 3.5-kilometer water canal which is the heart of the development and provides dual access to the sea, making Dubai Marina a foremost sailing destination. It is on Interchange 5 between Jebel Ali Port and the area which hosts Dubai Internet City, Dubai Media City, and the American University in Dubai. The first phase of this project has been completed. Dubai Marina was inspired by the Concord Pacific Place development along False Creek in Vancouver, BC, Canada. Much marine wildlife (especially whales and sharks) has entered the marina because of its proximity to the open sea.

=== Address Beach Resort and Address Beach Residences ===
The structure consists of two towers connected at the bottom, with a sky bridge at the top that connects the 63rd through the 77th levels. The sky bridge houses luxury apartments on the world's highest occupiable floor at 294.36 metres. Known as Jumeirah Gate, it opened in December 2020 and is situated along the beach. The towers have the world's highest infinity pool in a building, on the roof, at a height of 293.906 metres.

== Transportation ==
Transport in Dubai is controlled by the Roads and Transport Authority (RTA), an agency of the government of Dubai, formed by royal decree in 2005. The public transport network has in the past faced congestion and reliability issues which a large investment programme has addressed, including over AED 70 billion of improvements planned for completion by 2020, when the population of the city is projected to exceed 3.5 million. In 2009, there were an estimated 1,021,880 cars in Dubai. In January 2010, the proportion of Dubai residents who use public transport stood at 6%.

=== Road ===
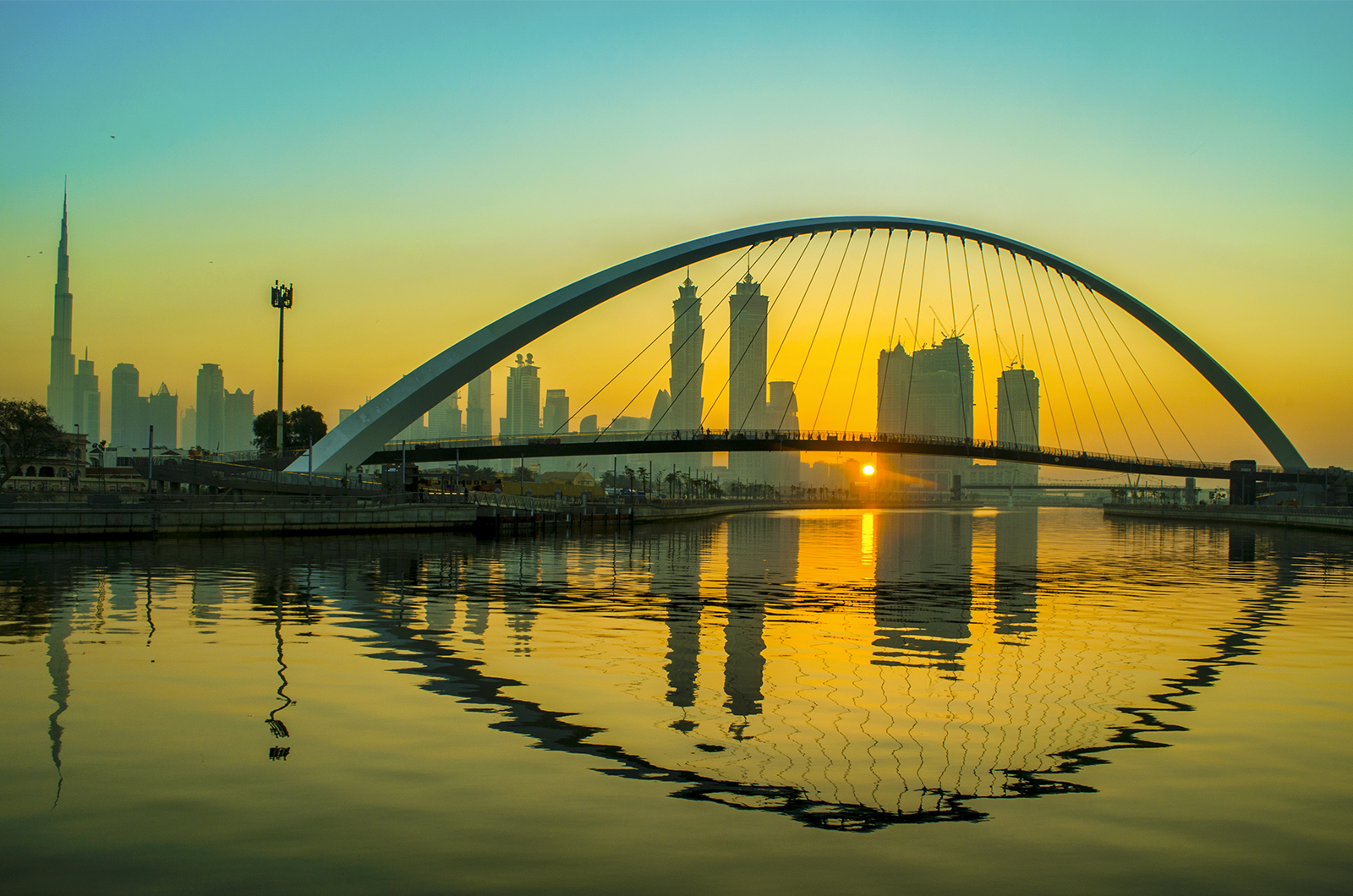
Tolerance Bridge of Business Bay

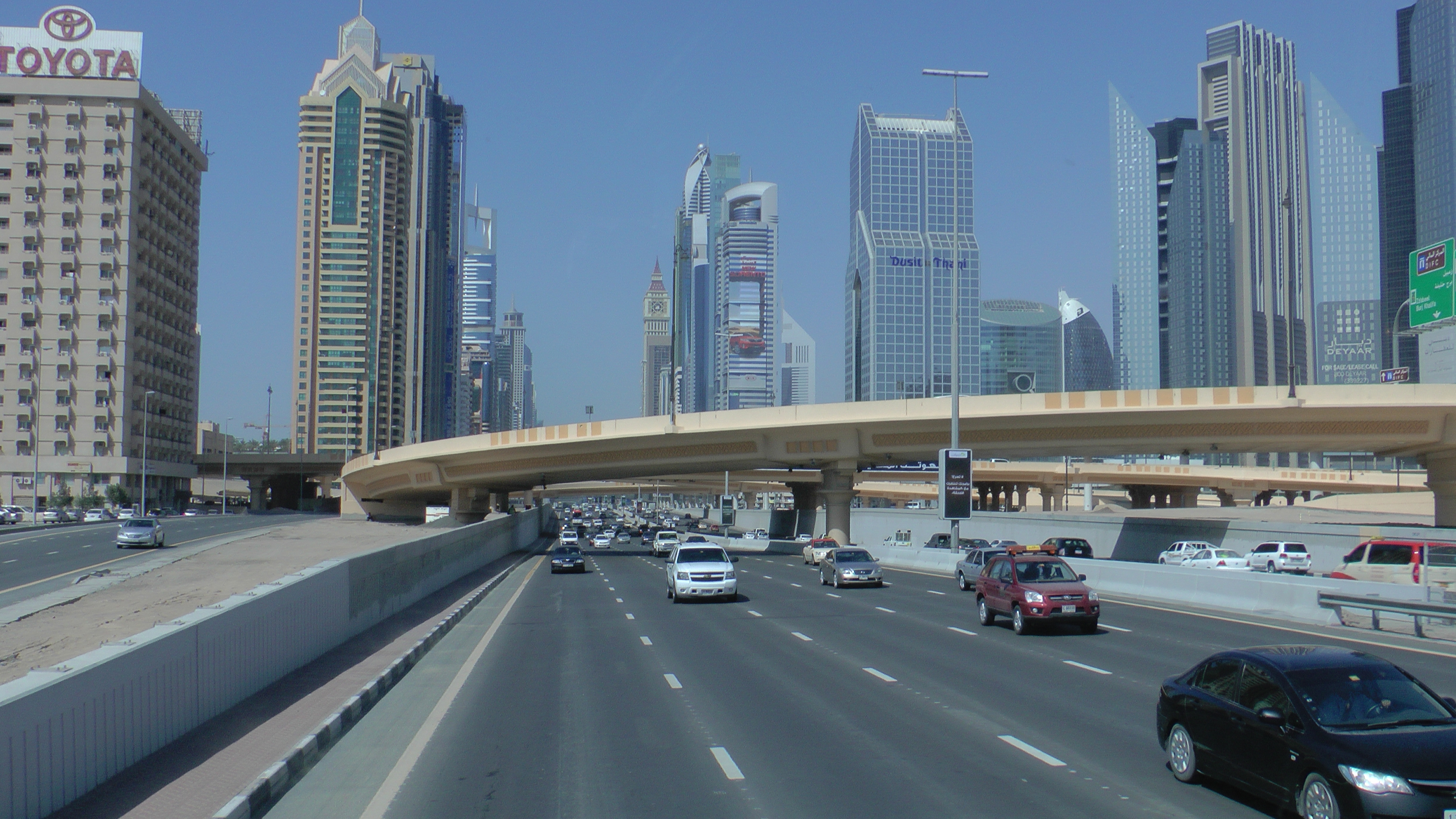
E 11 Road

Five main routes – E 11 (Sheikh Zayed Road), E 311 (Sheikh Mohammed Bin Zayed Road), E 44 (Dubai-Hatta Highway), E 77 (Dubai-Al Habab Road), and E 66 (Oud Metha Road, Dubai-Al Ain Road, or Tahnoun Bin Mohammad Al Nahyan Road) – run through Dubai, connecting the city to other towns and emirates. Additionally, several important intra-city routes, such as D 89 (Al Maktoum Road/Airport Road), D 85 (Baniyas Road), D 75 (Sheikh Rashid Road), D 73 (Al Dhiyafa Road now named as 2 December street), D 94 (Jumeirah Road), and D 92 (Al Khaleej/Al Wasl Road) connect the various localities in the city. The eastern and western sections of the city are connected by Al Maktoum Bridge, Al Garhoud Bridge, Al Shindagha Tunnel, Business Bay Crossing, and Floating Bridge.

The RTA operates Dubai's public bus transport system. The bus system services 140 routes and transports over 109 million people in 2008. By the end of 2010, there will be 2,100 buses in service across the city. In 2006, the transport authority announced the construction of 500 air-conditioned passenger bus shelters, and planned for 1,000 more across the emirates in a move to encourage the use of public buses.

The RTA licenses all taxi services. Dubai-licensed taxis are easily identifiable by their cream bodywork, with varied roof colours indicating the operator. Dubai Taxi Corporation, a division of the RTA, is the largest operator and operates red-roofed taxis. There are five private operators: Metro Taxis (orange roofs); Network Taxis (yellow roofs); Cars Taxis (blue roofs); Arabia Taxis (green roofs); and City Taxis (purple roofs). In addition, there is a Ladies and Families taxi service (pink roofs) with female drivers, which caters exclusively to women and children. More than 3,000 taxis operate in the emirate, averaging 192,000 trips daily and carrying about 385,000 people. In 2009, taxi trips exceeded 70 million trips, serving around 140.45 million passengers.

=== Air ===
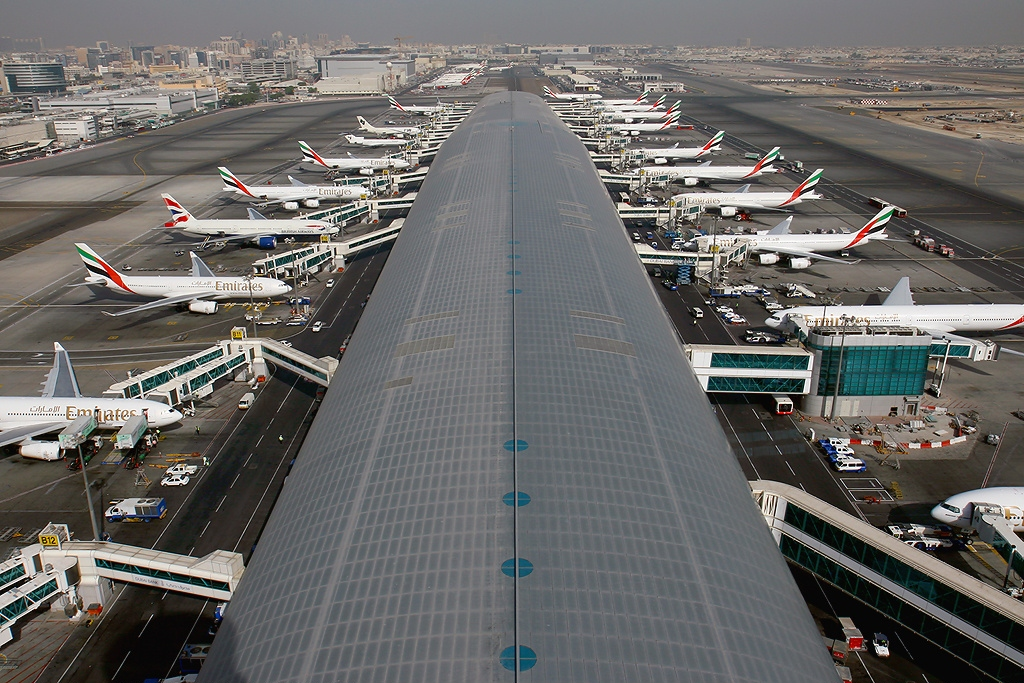
Dubai International Airport is the busiest airport in the world by international passenger traffic.

Dubai International Airport (IATA: DXB), the hub for the Emirates airline, serves the city of Dubai and other emirates in the country. The airport is the third-busiest airport in the world by passenger traffic and the world's busiest airport by international passenger traffic. In addition to being an important passenger traffic hub, the airport is the sixth-busiest cargo airport in world, handling 2.37 million tons of cargo in 2014. Emirates is one of the national flag carriers of the United Arab Emirates. As of 2018, it operated internationally, serving over 150 destinations in over 70 countries across six continents.

The development of Al Maktoum International Airport (IATA: DWC) was announced in 2004. The first phase of the airport, featuring one A380-capable runway, 64 remote stands, one cargo terminal with an annual capacity for 250,000 tonnes of cargo, and a passenger terminal building designed to accommodate five million passengers per year, has been opened. When completed, Dubai World Central-Al Maktoum International will be the largest airport in the world with five runways, four terminal buildings, and capacity for 160 million passengers and 12 million tons of cargo.

=== Rail ===
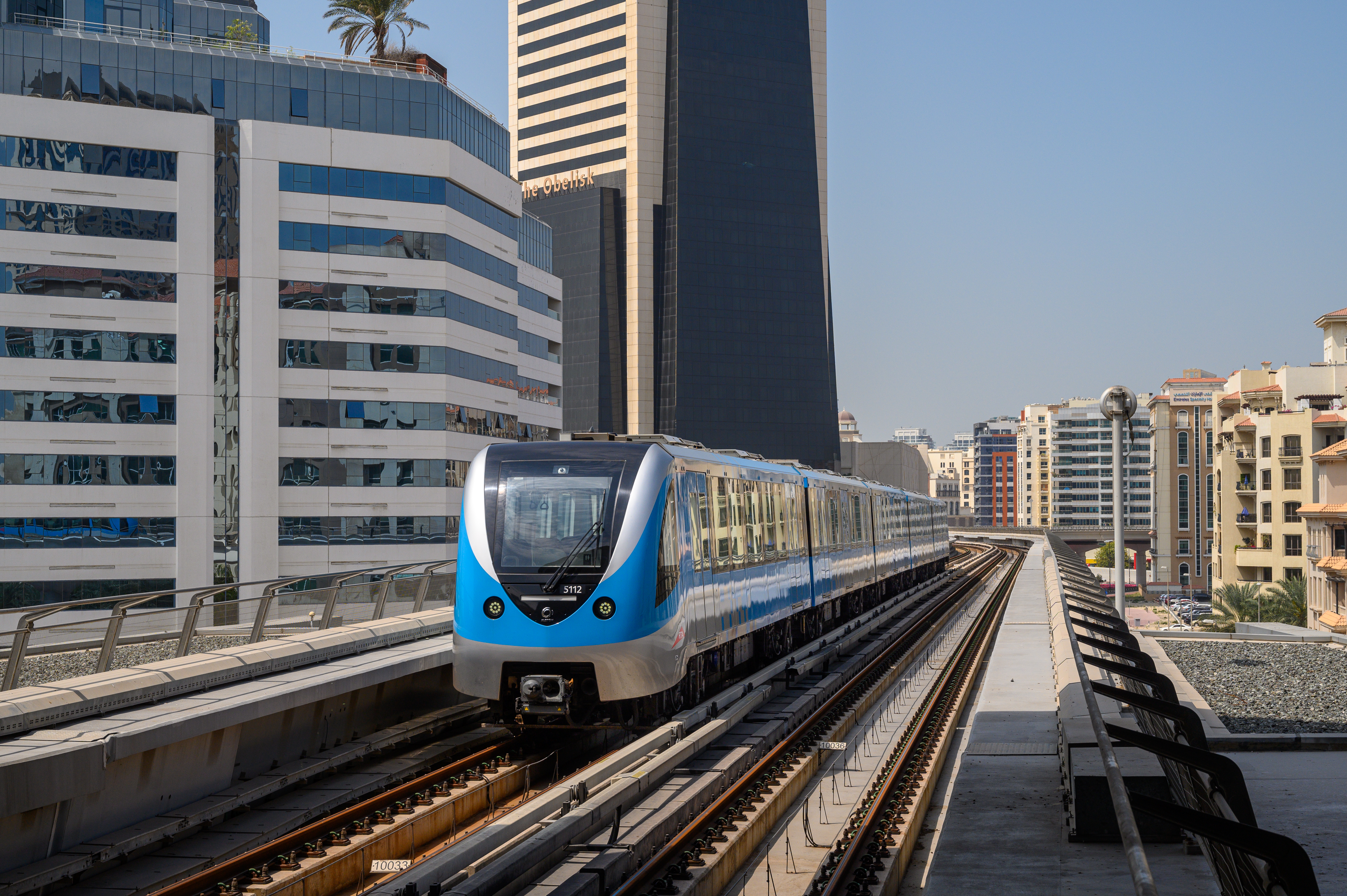
Dubai Metro is the first kind of rail transportation in the UAE, and is the Arabian Peninsula's first urban train network.

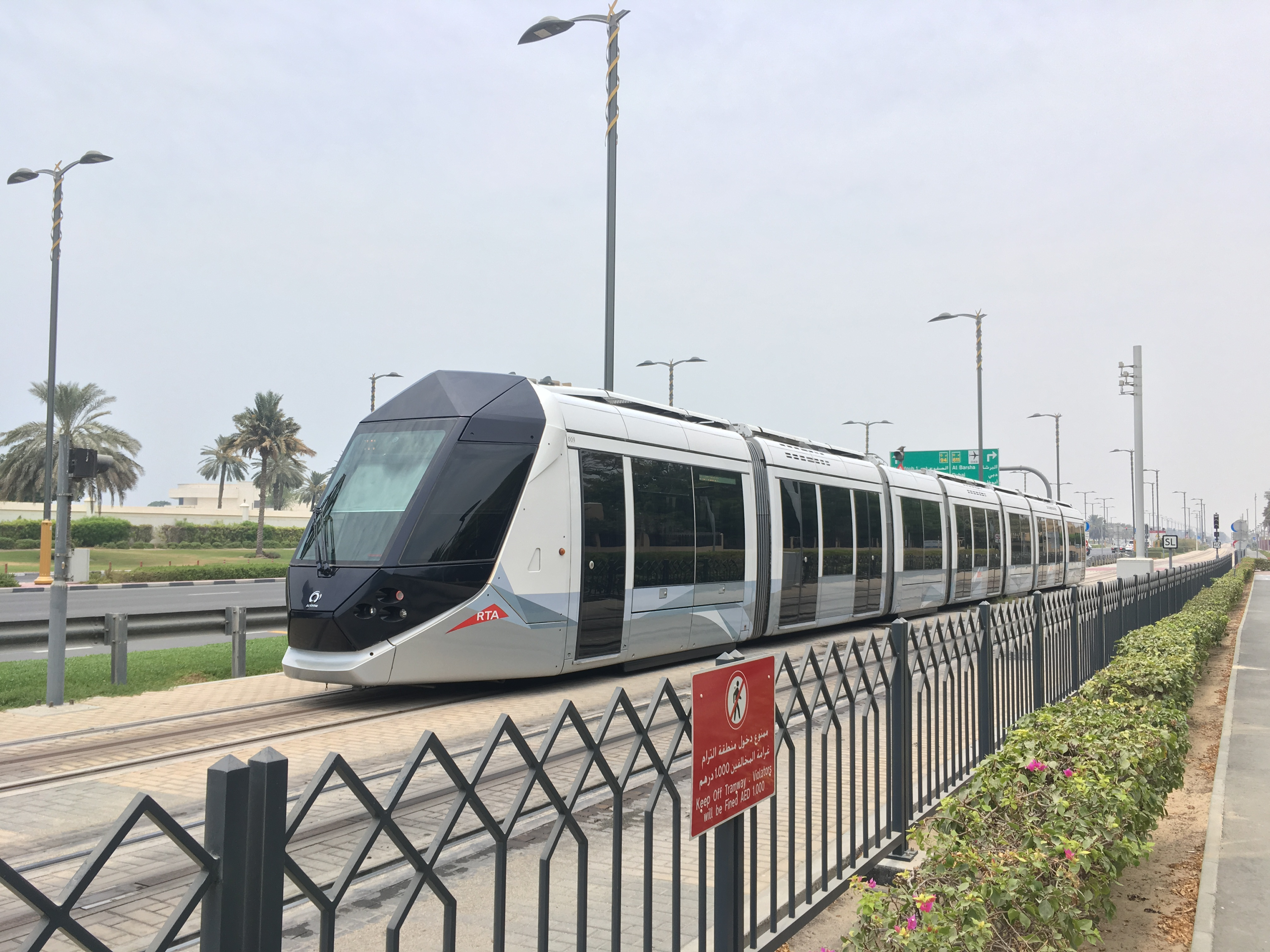
Dubai Tram is one of the first completely ground-level power supply-based tram networks in the world.

Dubai Metro consists of two lines (Red and Green) that run through the city's financial and residential areas. It was opened in September 2009. UK-based international service company Serco is responsible for operating the metro. The Red Line is the major backbone, with 29 stations (4 underground, 24 elevated, and one at ground level) running from Rashidiya Station to UAE Xchange Station in Jebel Ali. The Green Line, running from the Etisalat Station to the Creek Station, has 20 stations (8 underground, 12 elevated). An extension to the Red Line connecting the EXPO 2020 site opened on 1 June 2021. A Blue line is under construction and a Gold line is in planning. The Dubai Metro is the first urban train network in the Arabian Peninsula. The trains are fully automated and driverless.

A monorail line connecting the Palm Jumeirah to the mainland opened on 30 April 2009. It is the first monorail in the Middle East. An extension to connect to the Red Line of the Dubai Metro is planned.

A tramway located in Al Sufouh runs for 14.5 km (9.0 mi) along Al Sufouh Road from Dubai Marina to the Burj Al Arab and the Mall of the Emirates with two interchanges with the Dubai Metro Red Line. The first section, a 10.6 km (6.6 mi)- long tram line serving 11 stations, was opened in 2014. Phase 2 of the tramway plans to add 4 km of track to link to the Mall of the Emirates. No completion date has been announced.

Dubai has announced it will complete a link of the UAE high-speed rail system, which is planned to link with the whole GCC (Gulf Cooperation Council, also known as Cooperation Council for the Arab States of the Gulf), and then possibly Europe. The high-speed rail will support passengers and cargo. Passenger trains began operation between Abu Dhabi and Fujairah on 30 June 2026, with a subsequent station in Dubai (Jumeirah Golf Estates) planned to open on 30 September 2026.

=== Waterways ===
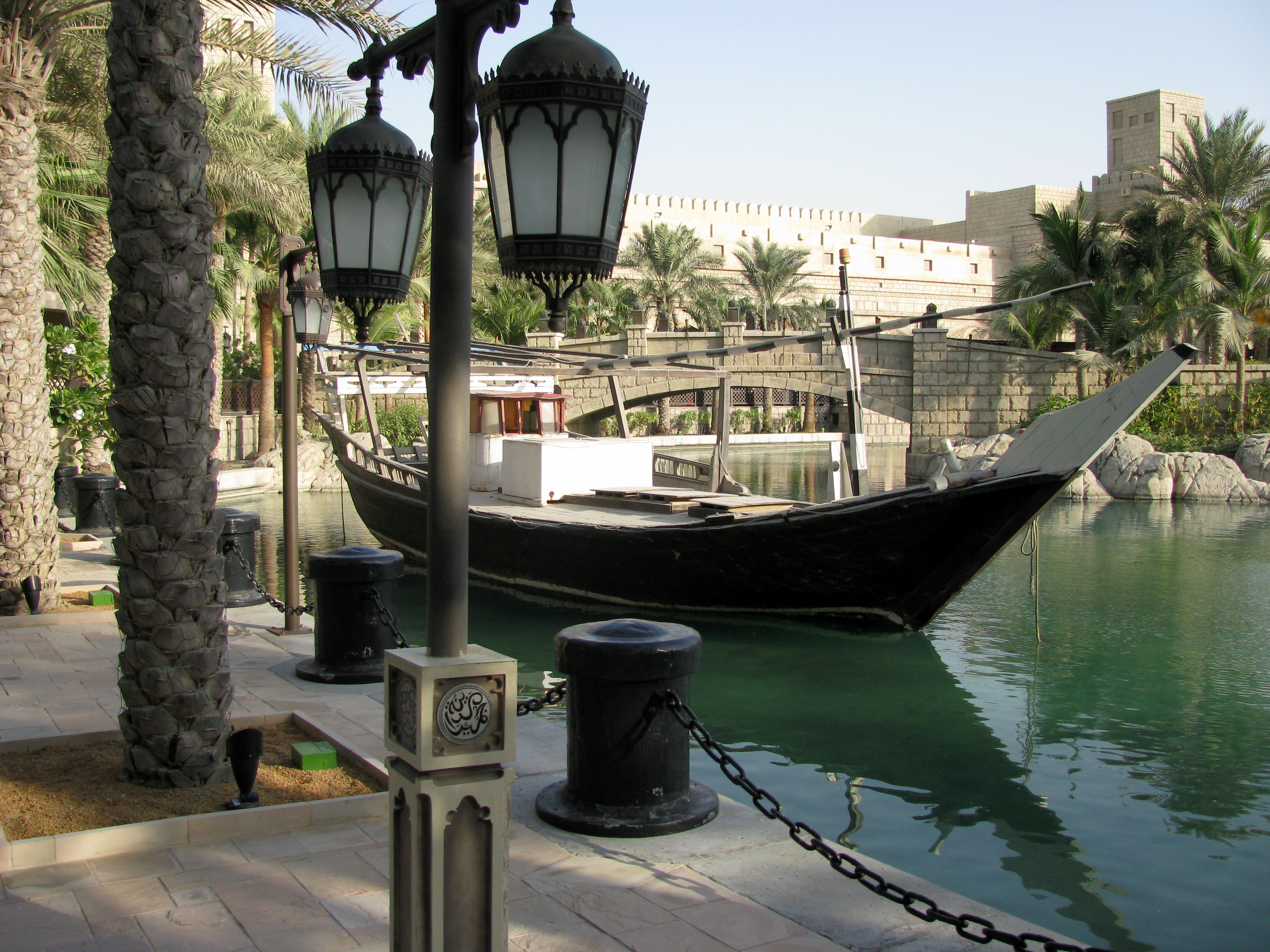
Abras and dhows are traditional modes of waterway transport.

There are two major commercial ports in Dubai, Port Rashid and Port Jebel Ali. Port Jebel Ali is the world's largest human-made harbour, the biggest port in the Middle East, and the 7th-busiest port in the world. One of the more traditional methods of getting across Bur Dubai to Deira is by abras, small boats that ferry passengers across the Dubai Creek, between abra stations in Bastakiya and Baniyas Road. The Marine Transport Agency has also implemented the Dubai Water Bus System. The water bus is a fully air-conditioned boat service connecting selected destinations across the creek. One can also use the tourist water bus service in Dubai. The latest addition to the water transport system is the Water Taxi. The Water-Taxis can transport a maximum of 20 passengers at a time which provides a smooth journey along Al Mamzar and Dubai Marina via Dubai Creek. It has 40 pickup points across Dubai.

Dubai is increasingly leveraging its logistics and ports to participate in trade between Europe and China, as well as between Europe and Africa, in addition to oil transport. For this purpose, ports such as Jebel Ali and Mina Rashid are rapidly expanded, and investments are made in their technology. The country is historically and currently part of the Maritime Silk Road that runs from the Chinese coast to the south via the southern tip of India to Mombasa, from there through the Red Sea via the Suez Canal to the Mediterranean, there to the Upper Adriatic region to the northern Italian hub of Trieste with its rail connections to Central Europe, Eastern Europe, and the North Sea.

== Culture ==
Museum of the Future

The UAE's culture mainly reflects traditional Arab culture. The influence of Arab and Islamic cultures on architecture, music, attire, cuisine, and lifestyle is also pronounced. Five times a day, Muslims are called to prayer from the minarets of mosques scattered across the country. Major holidays in Dubai include Eid al-Fitr, which marks the end of Ramadan, and National Day (2 December), which marks the formation of the United Arab Emirates.

The city's cultural imprint as a small, ethnically homogeneous pearling community was transformed by the arrival of other ethnic groups and nationals—first by Iranians in the early 1900s, and later by Indians and Pakistanis in the 1960s. In 2005, 84% of Dubai's metropolitan population was foreign-born, about half of whom were from India.

From 2006 to 2022, the weekend had been Friday and Saturday, as a compromise between Friday's holiness to Muslims and the Western weekend of Saturday and Sunday. Before 2006, the weekend was Thursday-Friday. On 1 January 2022, Dubai moved to a four-and-a-half-day working week, with the weekend comprising Friday afternoon, Saturday, and Sunday with stringent rules for foreign migrant workers.

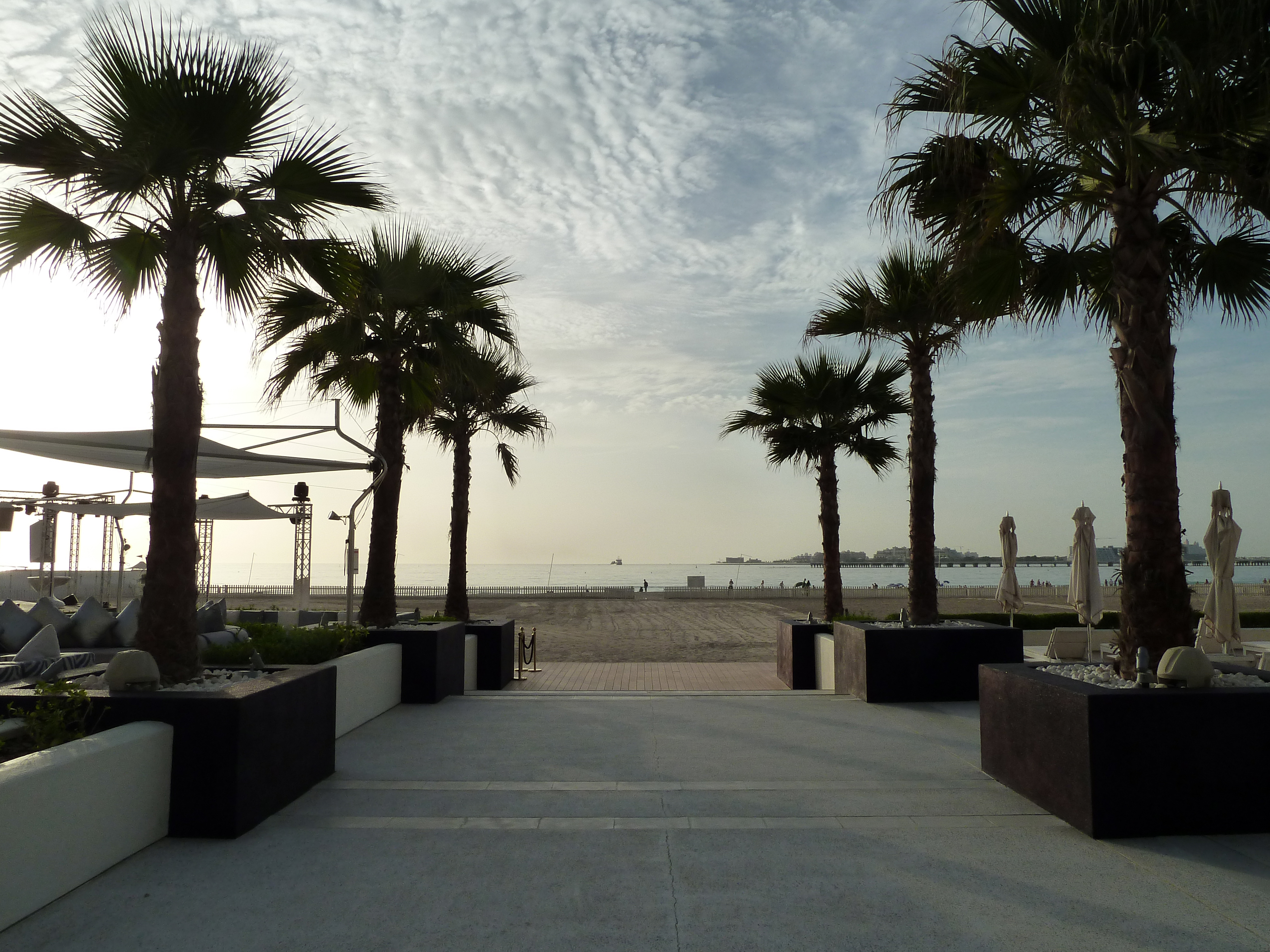
Meydan Beach Club, Jumeirah

Because of the tourism-driven entrepreneurial approach of many Dubai residents and the high standard of living, Dubai's culture has gradually evolved toward luxury, opulence, and lavishness, with a strong emphasis on leisure-related extravagance. Dubai is known for its nightlife. Clubs and bars are chiefly found in hotels due to liquor laws. The New York Times called Dubai "the kind of city where you might run into Michael Jordan at the Buddha Bar or stumble across Naomi Campbell celebrating her birthday with a multiday bash".

Annual entertainment events such as the Dubai Shopping Festival (DSF) and Dubai Summer Surprises (DSS) attract over 4 million visitors from across the region and generate revenues over $2.7 billion. The International Festivals and Events Association (IFEA), the world's leading events trade association, has crowned Dubai as IFEA World Festival and Event City, 2012 in the cities category with a population of more than one million.

Large shopping malls in the city, such as Deira City Centre, Mirdiff City Centre, BurJuman, Mall of the Emirates, Dubai Mall (the world's second-largest), Dubai Marina Mall, Dubai Hills Mall, Dragon Mart, Dubai Festival City Mall, and Ibn Battuta Mall as well as traditional Dubai Gold Souk, Al Souk Al Kabir (known as Meena Bazaar), and other souks attract shoppers from the region.

=== Cuisine ===
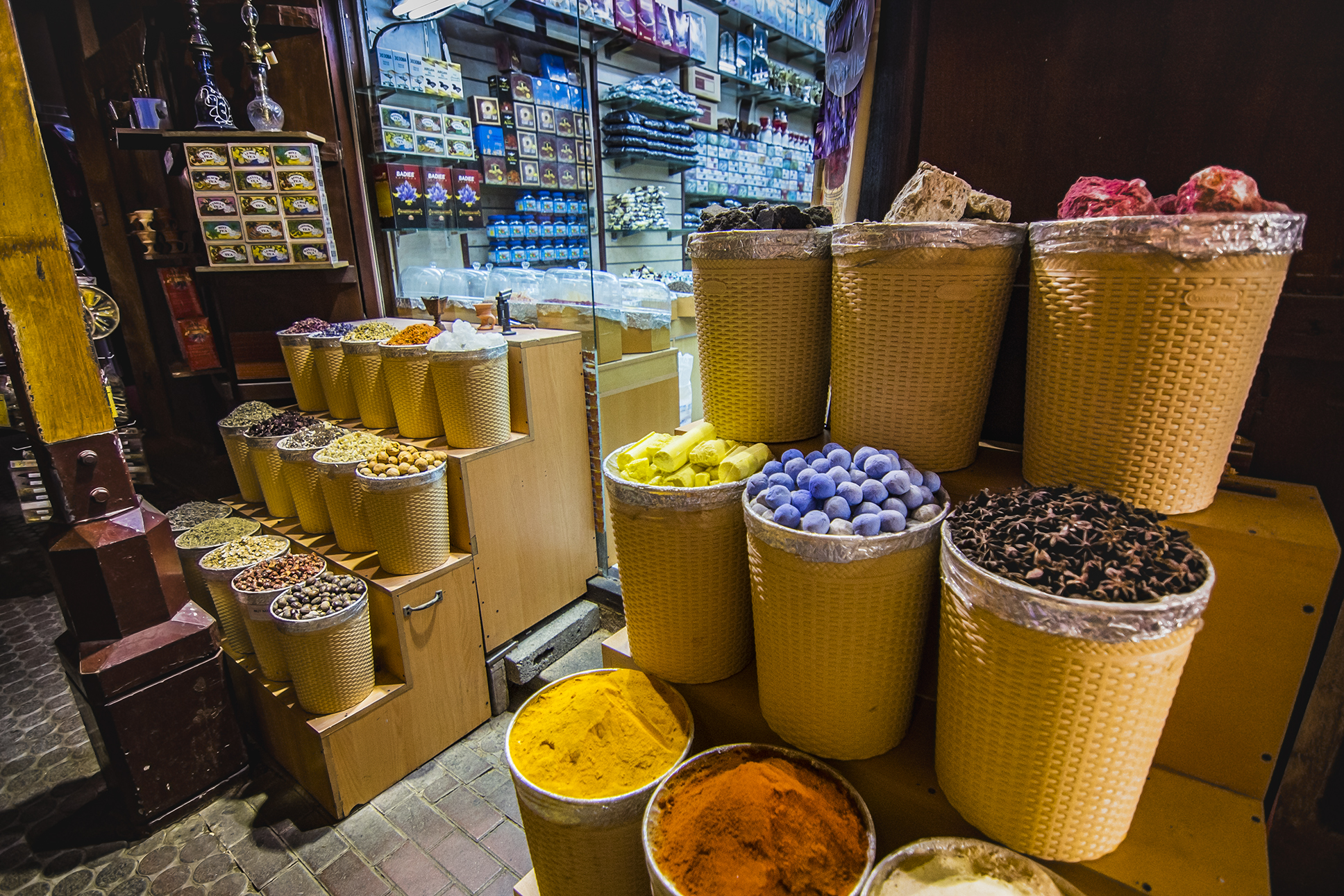
Traditional Middle Eastern spices at the Dubai Spice Souk in Deira, Old Dubai

Arabic cuisine is popular and is available everywhere in the city, from the small shawarma diners in Deira and Al Karama to the restaurants in Dubai's hotels. Fast food, South Asian, and Chinese cuisines are also very popular and are widely available. The sale and consumption of pork is regulated and is legally permitted to be sold only to non-Muslims, in designated areas of supermarkets and airports. Similarly, the sale of alcoholic beverages is also regulated. A liquor permit is required to purchase alcohol, but it is available at hotel bars and restaurants. Shisha and qahwa boutiques are also popular in Dubai. Biryani is also popular in Dubai.

The inaugural Dubai Food Festival was held between 21 February and 15 March 2014. The event was aimed at celebrating Dubai's position as the gastronomic capital region. The festival was designed to showcase the variety of flavours and cuisines on offer in Dubai, featuring dishes from over 200 nationalities. The next food festival was held between 23 February 2017 and 11 March 2017.

=== Entertainment ===
Dubai Opera

Dubai Opera opened its doors on 31 August 2016 in Downtown Dubai with a performance by Plácido Domingo. The venue is a 2000-seat, multifunctional performing arts centre that can host not only theatrical shows, concerts, and operas, but also weddings, gala dinners, banquets, and conferences. Arabic movies are popular in Dubai and the UAE. Since 2004, the city has hosted the annual Dubai International Film Festival which serves as a showcase for Arab and Middle Eastern filmmaking talent. The Dubai Desert Rock Festival was also another major festival consisting of heavy metal and rock artists but is no longer held in Dubai.

One of the lesser-known sides of Dubai is the importance of its young contemporary art gallery scene. Since 2008, the leading contemporary art galleries such as Carbon 12 Dubai, Green Art, gallery Isabelle van den Eynde, and The Third Line have brought the city onto the international art map. Art Dubai, the region's growing and reputable art fair, is also a major contributor to the development of the contemporary art scene. The Theatre of Digital Art Dubai (ToDA) opened in 2020 and presents immersive digital art, including contemporary work.

=== Media ===
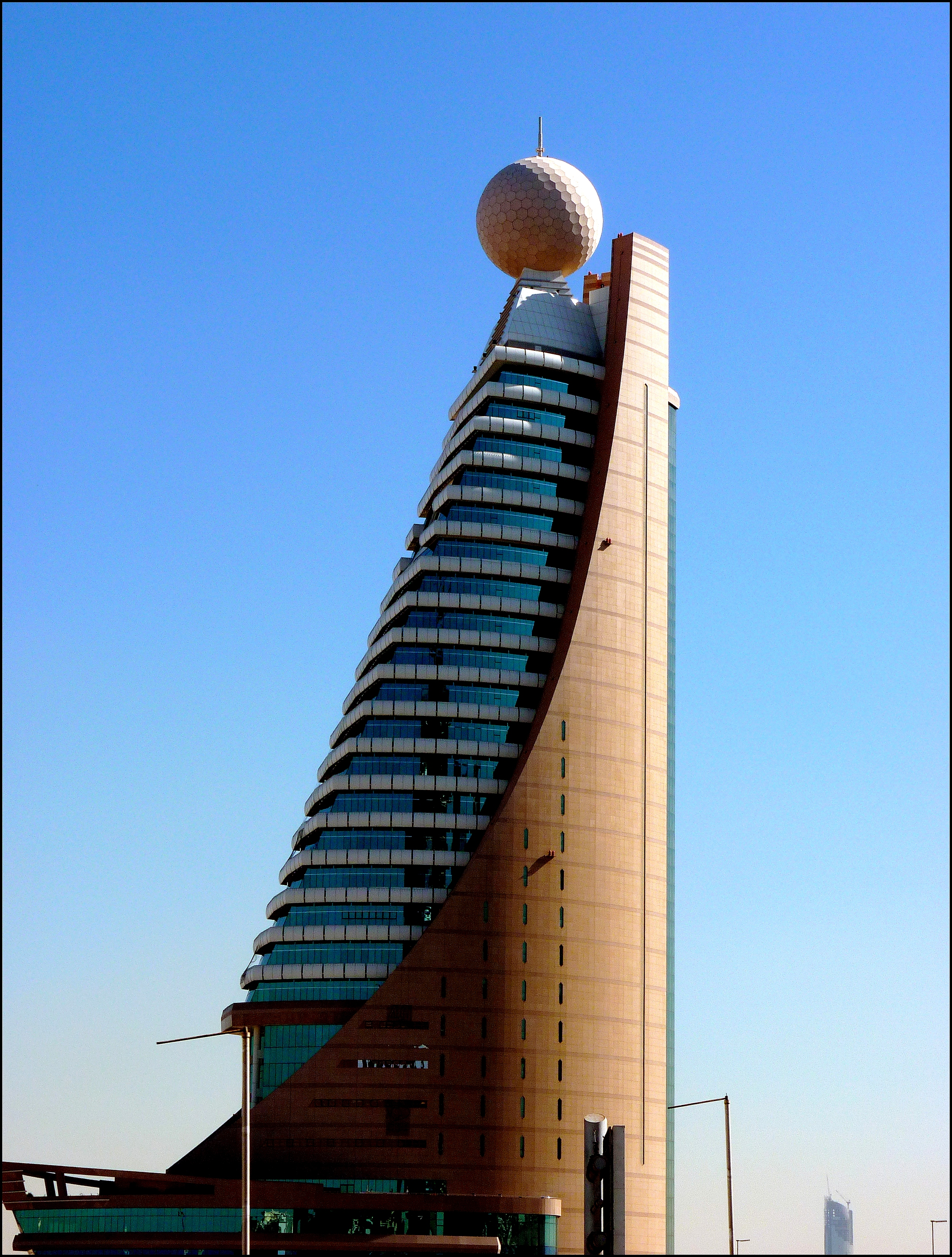
Etisalat's headquarters in Dubai

Many international news agencies, such as Reuters, APTN, Bloomberg L.P., and Middle East Broadcasting Centre (MBC), operate in Dubai Media City and Dubai Internet City. Additionally, several local network television channels, such as Dubai One (formerly Channel 33) and Dubai TV (EDTV), provide programming in English and Arabic, respectively. Dubai is also the headquarters for several print media outlets. Dar Al Khaleej, Al Bayan, and Al Ittihad are the city's largest circulating Arabic language newspapers, while Gulf News, Khaleej Times, Khaleej Mag, and 7days are the largest circulating English newspapers.

Etisalat, the government-owned telecommunications provider, held a virtual monopoly over telecommunications services in Dubai before the establishment of other, smaller telecommunications companies, such as Emirates Integrated Telecommunications Company (EITC—better known as Du) in 2006. The Internet was introduced into the UAE (and therefore Dubai) in 1995. The network has an Internet bandwidth of 7.5 Gbit/s and supports 49 STM-1 links. Dubai houses two of four Domain Name System (DNS) data centres in the country (DXBNIC1, DXBNIC2). Censorship is common in Dubai and used by the government to control content that it believes violates the cultural and political sensitivities of Emirates. Homosexuality, drugs, and the theory of evolution are generally considered taboo.

Internet content is regulated in Dubai. Etisalat uses a proxy server to filter Internet content the government deems inconsistent with the values of the country, such as sites that provide information on how to bypass the proxy; sites about dating, gay and lesbian networks, and pornography; and formerly sites originating from Israel. Emirates Media and Internet (a division of Etisalat) notes that as of 2002, 76% of Internet users are male. About 60% of Internet users were Asian, and 25% were Arab. Dubai enacted the Electronic Transactions and Commerce Law in 2002, which addresses digital signatures and electronic registers. It prohibits Internet Service Providers (ISPs) from disclosing information gathered in the course of providing services. The penal code contains official provisions that prohibit digital access to pornography; however, it does not address cyber crime or data protection.

In 2019, the Italian artist Princess Bee produced "Hi Dubai", the first cross-media project that reveals the "soul of the city" through the life and work experiences of 25 Emirati and expat women. The series also promoted the Emirati lifestyle and events to attract young people to visit and live in Dubai. "Hi Dubai" aired during prime time (after the National News and during the UAE National Day week) on Dubai One. It was then distributed online through Dubai Post and shown in ICE, the in-flight entertainment system of the Emirates airline.

=== Sports ===
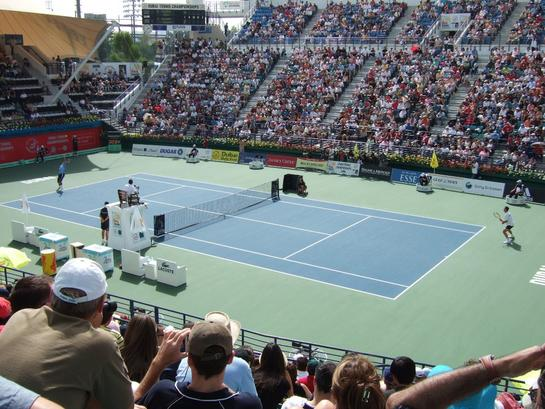
Dubai Tennis Stadium

Football and cricket are the most popular sports in Dubai. The International Cricket Council is headquartered there. Three football teams (Al Wasl FC, Shabab Al-Ahli Dubai FC, and Al Nasr SC) represent Dubai in the UAE Pro League. Al-Wasl have the second-most championships in the UAE League, after Al Ain. Dubai also hosts both the annual Dubai Tennis Championships and The Legends Rock Dubai tennis tournaments, as well as the Dubai Desert Classic golf tournament and the DP World Tour Championship, all of which attract sports stars from around the world. The Dubai World Cup, a thoroughbred horse race, is held annually at the Meydan Racecourse. The city's top basketball team in the UAE National Basketball League has traditionally been Shabab Al Ahli Basket. In 2023, Dubai Basketball—which competes in the ABA League and EuroLeague—was founded. Dubai also hosts the traditional rugby union tournament, Dubai Sevens, part of the Sevens World Series. In 2009, Dubai hosted the 2009 Rugby World Cup Sevens.

Auto racing is also a major sport in Dubai; the Dubai Autodrome hosts many auto racing events throughout the year. Another sporting event in Dubai is the Dubai Run, which is part of the Dubai Fitness Challenge and the world's largest free fun run, a main highlight of the challenge since 2017. It also features a state-of-the-art indoor and outdoor Kartdrome, popular among racing enthusiasts and recreational riders.

The Indian Premier League cricket competition was held in the UAE in 2020 due to the COVID-19 pandemic. On 12 June, Tommy Fleetwood, 7-time DP World Tour winner, was declared World Global Ambassador. In 2025, Dubai introduced the "Dubai Sports Strategy 2033", a long-term framework designed to support the emirate's sports sector and strengthen its position as a global sports destination. The strategy outlines initiatives to expand community participation in physical activity, enhance the quality and number of sporting events, and develop local talent across multiple disciplines. It also aims to increase the economic contribution of Dubai's sports industry through targeted programmes and infrastructure development.

=== Dress code ===
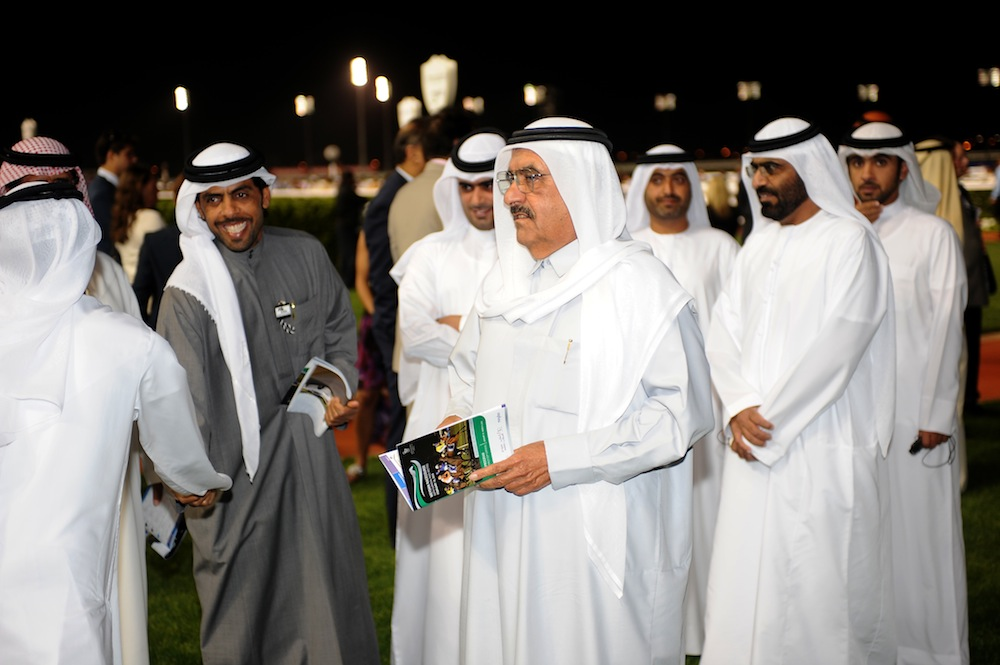
Men wearing the kandurah and the traditional ghotrah, held in place by an egal

The Emirati attire is typical of several countries in the Arabian Peninsula. Women usually wear the "abaya", a long black robe, with a hijab (a headscarf that covers the neck and part of the head, all of the hair and the ears). Some women may wear a niqab that covers the mouth and nose, leaving only the eyes exposed. Men wear the "kandurah" also referred to as "dishdasha" or even "thawb" (long white robe) and the headscarf (ghotrah). The traditional ghutrah in the UAE is white and held in place by an accessory called "egal", which resembles a black cord. Younger Emiratis prefer to wear red-and-white ghutrah and tie them around their heads like turbans.

The dress code is never compulsory; many people wear Western or other Eastern clothing. However, prohibitions on "indecent clothing" or revealing too much skin are aspects of the UAE to which Dubai's visitors are expected to conform and are encoded in Dubai's criminal law. The UAE has enforced decency regulations in most public places, aside from waterparks, beaches, clubs, and bars.

== Education ==
The school system in Dubai follows the United Arab Emirates' system. As of 2009, there are 79 public schools run by the Ministry of Education that serve Emiratis and expatriate Arab people, as well as 207 private schools. The medium of instruction in public schools is Arabic with emphasis on English as a second language, while most of the private schools use English as their medium of instruction. Currently, only the Swiss International Scientific School in Dubai claims to offer parallel streams in different languages – bilingual English/French or English/German. Most private schools cater to one or more expatriate communities.

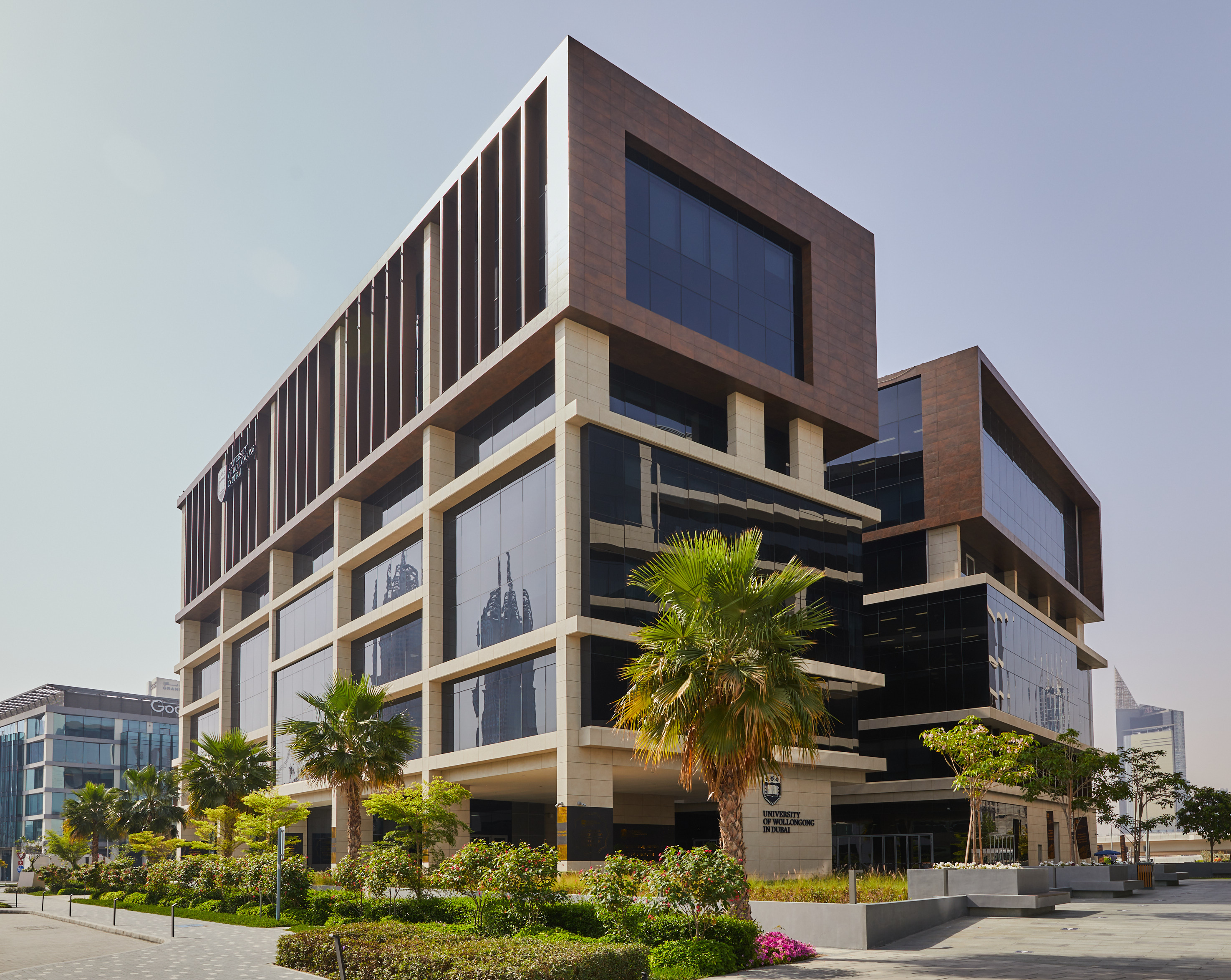
University of Wollongong in Dubai

Some 36 schools offer international education using one or more of the four International Baccalaureate Programmes for students aged 3–19. Currently, 15 schools have introduced the IB Career-related Programme that can be combined with a vocational qualification such as a BTEC.

While there are more UK-curriculum-based schools in Dubai than any other curriculum, more students attend Indian-curriculum schools, which tend to be considerably larger and cost less to attend. There are 34 Indian-curriculum schools in the emirate, most of which offer the CBSE, and just a handful the Indian Certificate of Secondary Education (ICSE) Indian syllabus. Examples of Indian-curriculum schools include IHS, DPS, and DMHS. There are a small number of Pakistani schools in Dubai offering the FBISE curriculum for expatriate children.

A total of 18 schools offer British primary education through age 11. There are 64 schools that offer a variation of a UK curriculum style secondary education, either a pure GCSE and A-Level offering, or increasingly I/GCSE up to 16, and then the IB Diploma post-16. Currently, no school in the UAE offers IB or A-level courses at age 16, but several schools have said they will offer them in the future. British style eleven-to-eighteen secondary schools offering General Certificate of Secondary Education and A-Levels include Dubai College, Dubai British School, and English Language School Pvt. Some schools, such as The American School of Dubai, also offer the curriculum of the United States.

Dubai has a very active education regulator, the KHDA, which is best known for its school ratings, but actually has a wide mandate when it comes to school improvement in the emirate. A total of 17 schools are currently rated Outstanding (2020), and a further 40 are rated Very Good. Parents in general rate schools highly.

The top 10 largest universities by student numbers in Dubai are Middlesex University Dubai, Heriot-Watt University Dubai, University of Wollongong in Dubai, Manipal Academy of Higher Education, Dubai, American University in Dubai, S P Jain School of Global Management, Rochester Institute of Technology of Dubai, Amity University Dubai, University of Birmingham Dubai, and Birla Institute of Technology and Science Pilani Dubai. They offer courses in all major subjects, with the most popular subject areas being Business, followed by Information Technology, then Engineering. Most Universities in Dubai are located in the two Educational Zones (Knowledge Village or Academic City). In 2013, Synergy University Dubai Campus opened its campus in Jumeirah Lakes Towers being a first University in Dubai to be located outside of Educational Zones (Knowledge Village or Academic City).

Only 4 Dubai Universities are present in the QS World University Rankings 2024/2025. To allow the assessment of more UAE Universities, the Ministry of Education launched The National Higher Education Institutions Classification Framework which classifies UAE Universities based on their research and teaching. Of the top 10 largest Dubai universities University of Wollongong in Dubai, American University in Dubai, and Rochester Institute of Technology of Dubai, were all classified as "Very Good" within The National Higher Education Institutions Classification Framework.

== Healthcare ==
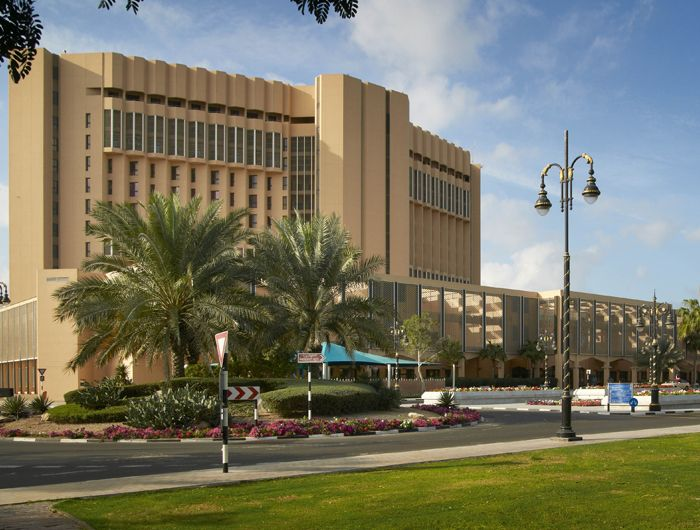
The Dubai Hospital

Healthcare in Dubai can be divided into two different sectors: public and private. Each Emirate can set healthcare standards in accordance with its internal laws, though the standards and regulations rarely differ significantly. Public hospitals in Dubai were first established in the late 1950s and continued to expand alongside public health initiatives. There are now 28 hospitals in Dubai, six public and 22 private, with three more major hospitals scheduled to be built by 2025.

By the end of 2012, there were also a total of 1,348 medical clinics, 97% of which were operated privately. In 2015, Dubai phased in mandatory health insurance for all inhabitants, thereby leading to increased demand for medical services.

Dubai Hospital is a public hospital in Dubai and is part of Dubai Department of Health and Medical Services. Although the decision to construct Dubai Hospital was made in 1977, it did not begin admitting patients until March 1983. The hospital consists of 14 stories, with the lower two for Accident & Emergency and outpatients, and the upper ten floors.

== Twin towns – sister cities ==
Dubai is twinned with:

- Amman, Jordan
- Beirut, Lebanon
- Busan, South Korea (2006)
- Cape Town, South Africa
- Casablanca, Morocco
- Kish Island, Iran
- Damascus, Syria
- (United Kingdom) Dundee, Scotland, UK (2004)
- (United States) Detroit, USA (2003)
- Frankfurt, Germany (2005)
- Gaza City, Palestine
- Gold Coast, Australia (2001)
- Guangzhou, China
- Istanbul, Turkey (1997)
- Kuala Lumpur, Malaysia (2010)
- Moscow, Russia
- Mumbai, India
- Osaka Prefecture, Japan (2002)
- Pyongyang, North Korea
- San Juan, Puerto Rico
- San Salvador, El Salvador
- Shanghai, China

== See also ==
- Archaeology of the United Arab Emirates
- Al Sufouh Archaeological Site
- Dubai Desert Conservation Reserve
- List of buildings in Dubai
- Outline of Dubai
- Sanitation in Dubai
- Sustainability in Dubai
