= Ras Al Khor Industrial Area =

Industrial area in Dubai, the UAE

Ras Al Khor Industrial Area رَأْس ٱلْخُوْر ٱلصَّنَاعِيَّة
- Community
- Location of Ras Al Khor in the UAE Ras Al Khor Industrial Area (United Arab Emirates) Ras Al Khor Industrial Area (Persian Gulf) Ras Al Khor Industrial Area (Middle East) Ras Al Khor Industrial Area (West and Central Asia)
- Coordinates: 25°10′39.36″N 55°20′55.61″E
- Country: United Arab Emirates
- Emirate: Dubai
- City: Dubai

Area
  - Total: 12.4 km^{2} (4.8 sq mi)

Population (2000)
  - Total: 10,685
  - Density: 862/km^{2} (2,230/sq mi)
- Community number: 612-614

Ras Al Khor Industrial Area (Arabic: رَأْس ٱلْخُوْر ٱلصَّنَاعِيَّة, romanized: Raʾs Al-Khūr Aṣ-Ṣanāʿiyyah) is a locality in Dubai, the United Arab Emirates.

Literally meaning "Head of the Creek", Ras Al Khor is part of several industrial areas (such as Al Aweer) located in the suburban areas of Dubai. The Industrial Area provides mixed-use development.

The Ras Al Khor Industrial Area comprises three sub-localities:

- Ras Al Khor Industrial Area 1
- Ras Al Khor Industrial Area 2
- Ras Al Khor Industrial Area 3

There is a nearby wildlife sanctuary.

== Dubai Metro ==
The Metro's Blue Line will provide two local stations in 2029:

- Ras Al Khor Industrial
- Auto Market

Proposed services at Ras Al Khor Industrial
Preceding station	Dubai Metro	Following station
Dubai Square towards Creek	Blue Line Creek branch Opening 2029	Auto Market towards Academic City

Proposed services at Auto Market
Preceding station	Dubai Metro	Following station
Ras Al Khor Industrial towards Creek	Blue Line Creek branch Opening 2029	International City 1 towards Academic City

== See also ==
- Arabian Peninsula
- Middle East
