= 2029 in rail transport =

This article lists events related to rail transport that are currently scheduled to occur in 2029. Please be aware that the actual dates on which these events occur may differ substantially from what is shown here.

== Events ==
=== January ===
- (Turkey) - A2 opens between Çankaya and Mamak.

=== July ===
- (Taiwan) – Taoyuan Airport MRT of the Taoyuan Metro extends to Zhongli from Huanbei.
- (United States) – Capitol Corridor is rerouted between Oakland Coliseum and Newark.

=== September ===
- (United Arab Emirates) 9 September – Blue Line of the Dubai Metro is scheduled to open between Creek and Dragon Mart.

=== November ===
- (Morocco) – Al Boraq High Speed Railway extends to Marrakesh from Casablanca.

=== December ===
- (Montenegro) – Bar – Golubovci railway is modernised.
- (South Korea) – Dongtan–Indeogwon Line of the Seoul Metropolitan Subway is scheduled to open between Indeogwon and Dongtan.
- (South Korea) – Gyenggang Line of the Seoul Metropolitan Subway extends to Wolgot from Pangyo.

=== Unknown date ===
- (Albania) – Vore–Hani i Hotit Railway is scheduled to open between Vore and Hani i Hotit.
- (Australia) – Cross River Rail of the Queensland Rail Citytrain is scheduled to open between Boggo Road and Exhibition.
- (Azerbaijan) – Baku tramway network will be reintroduced.
- (Belarus) – Passenger services resume to Minsk National Airport.
- (Canada) – Expo Line of the Vancouver SkyTrain extends to Langley from King George.
- (Chile) – Santiago–Batuco Commuter Rail extends to Quinta Normal from Quilicura.
- (China) – Changsha–Liuyang Maglev line is scheduled to open between Huanghua Airport Terminal 3 and Liuyang.
- (Estonia) – Tallinn Tramway Network: Liivalaia Line is scheduled to open between Liivalaia Street and Kristiine Shopping Center; Pelgulinna Line is scheduled to open between Kopli and Stroomni Beach.
- (Finland) – Vantaa Light Rail is scheduled to open between Mellunkylä and Helsinki Airport.
- (France) – Line 16 of the Paris Metro is scheduled to open between Parc du Blanc-Mesnil. and Noisy–Champs.
- (France) – Line 17 of the Paris Metro is scheduled to open between Le Bourget Aéroport and Parc des Expositions.
- (United Kingdom) – Trenitalia France introduces a direct train between Paris and London.
- (Georgia (country)) – Tbilisi tramway network is reintroduced.
- (Germany) – Siemensbahn reopens.
- (Germany) – U5 of the Hamburg U-Bahn extends to Bramfeld from City Nord.
- – Tung Chung Line of the Hong Kong MTR extends to Tung Chung West from Tung Chung.
- (Republic of Ireland) – DART extends to Maynooth and M3 Parkway from Dublin.
- – East Line of the Macau Light Rapid Transit is scheduled to open between Border Gate and Taipa Ferry Terminal.
- – Mexico City–Queretaro Line is scheduled to open between Mexico City and Queretaro.
- (Norway) – Fornebu Line of the Oslo Metro is scheduled to open between Majorstuen and Fornebu.
- (Poland) – Passenger trains start running to Warsaw Modlin Airport.
- – Jurong Region Line of the Singapore MRT extends to Peng Kang Hill from Pandan Reservoir.
- (South Korea) – Line 1 of the Seoul Subway branches off to Dongtan from Seodongtan.
- (South Korea) – Line 7 of the Seoul Subway extends to Cheongna International City from Cheongna International Business Complex.
- (South Korea) – Shinbundang Line of the Seoul Metropolitan Subway extends to Homaesil from Gwanggyo Jungang.
- (Spain) – Line 5 of the Bilbao Metro extends to San Inazio from Galdakao.
- (Sweden) – Uppsala Light Rail is scheduled to open between Bergsbrunna and Uppsala Central.
- (Thailand) – Silver Line of the Bangkok MRT is scheduled to open between Bang Na and Suvarnabhumi South Terminal.
- (Turkey) – Çorum-Delice high-speed line is scheduled to open.
- (United States) – Colorado Connector is scheduled to start between Denver and Fort Collins.
- (United States) – Orange Line of the VTA Light Rail extends to Eastridge Transit Center from Alum Rock.
- (United States) – TEXRail extends to Medical District from T&P Station.
- (Vietnam) – Hoàn Kiếm Line of the Hanoi Metro opens from Nam Thăng Long to Trần Hưng Đạo.
