= Airport Terminal 3 (Dubai Metro) =

Rapid transit station in the UAE

Airport Terminal 3 المطار- مبنى رقم 3

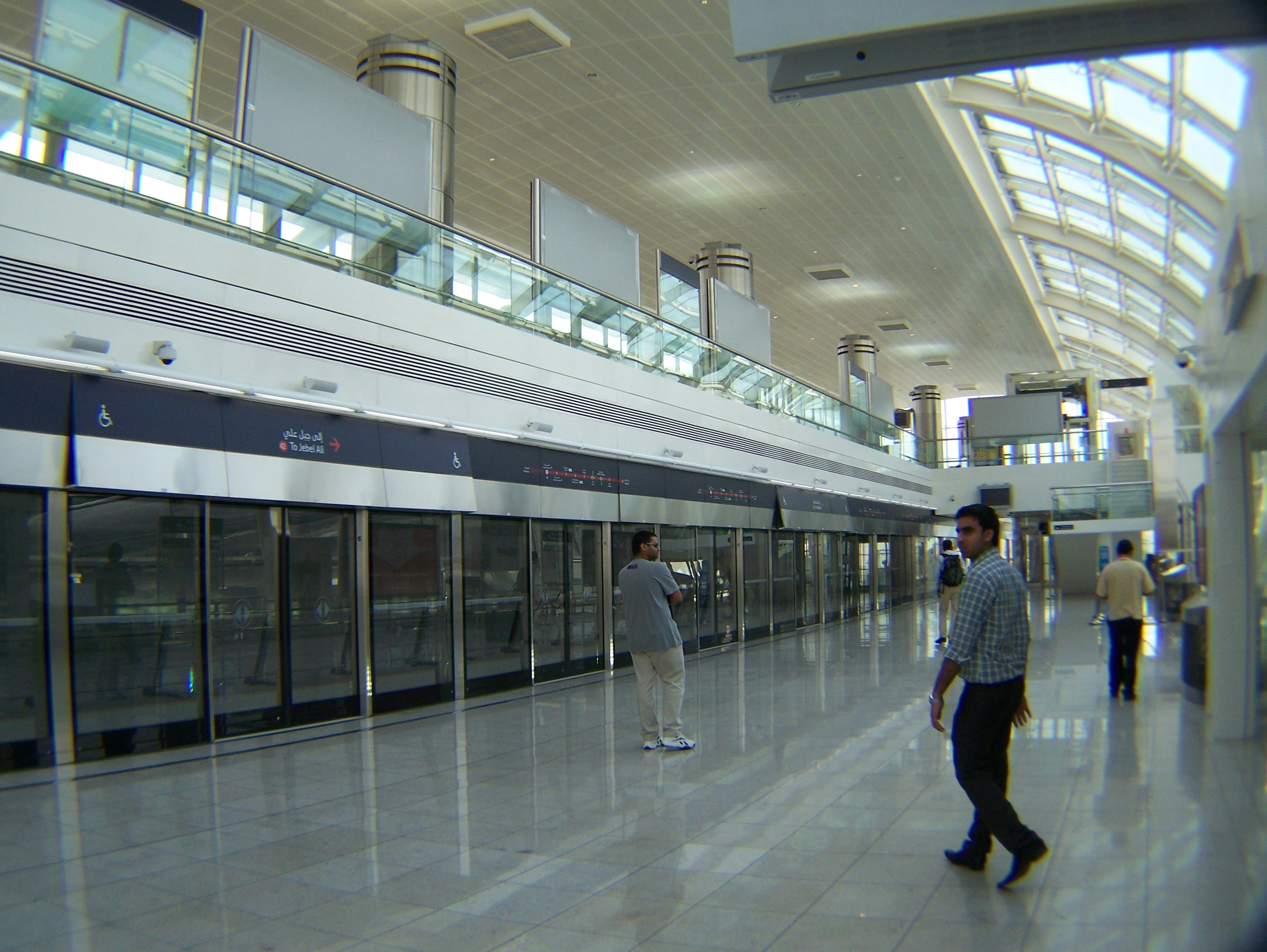
- Platform view in 2012

General information
- Location: Dubai Airport Road; Terminal 3 Dubai International Airport; Garhoud, Dubai; United Arab Emirates
- Coordinates: 25°14′42.96″N 55°21′24.86″E
- System: Metro Station
- Operator: Dubai Metro
- Line: Red Line
- Platforms: 2
- Tracks: 2
- Connections: RTA Dubai: 25 Rashidiya Bus Stn. - Gold Souq Bus Stn.; 77 RTA HQ via Airport 3 - Baniyas Square MS; C01 Airport Terminal 3 - Satwa Stn.; N30 Gold Souq Stn. - Al Qusais Stn.; Ajman Transport Authority: DXB2-1 Al Musalla Bus Stn. - Airport Terminal 3

Other information
- Station code: 13
- Fare zone: 5

History
- Opened: September 9, 2009

Services
Preceding station	Dubai Metro	Following station
Airport Terminal 1 towards Expo 2020 or Life Pharmacy	Red Line	Emirates towards Centrepoint
Location

Airport Terminal 3 (Arabic: المطار- مبنى رقم 3) is a rapid transit station on the Red Line of the Dubai Metro in Dubai, UAE, serving the Terminal 3 of Dubai International Airport.

The station opened as part of the Red Line on 9 September 2009. It is close to the Emirates Group Headquarters. The station is also close to a few bus routes.

The station consists of 2 tracks and 2 exits, one for getting off the station and one for connecting to the airport.

== Station layout ==
G	Street level	Exit/ Entrance
M	Mezzanine	Fare control, station agent, Ticket/token, shops
P	Side platform | Doors will open on the left
P	Platform 2 Eastbound	Towards ← Centrepoint; Next station: Emirates
P	Side platform | Doors will open on the left
P	Platform 1 Westbound	Towards → Life Pharmacy / Expo 2020; Next station: Airport Terminal 1
