= Dubai International City =

International City Phase 1, Dubai
- City
- Dubai International City Phase 1
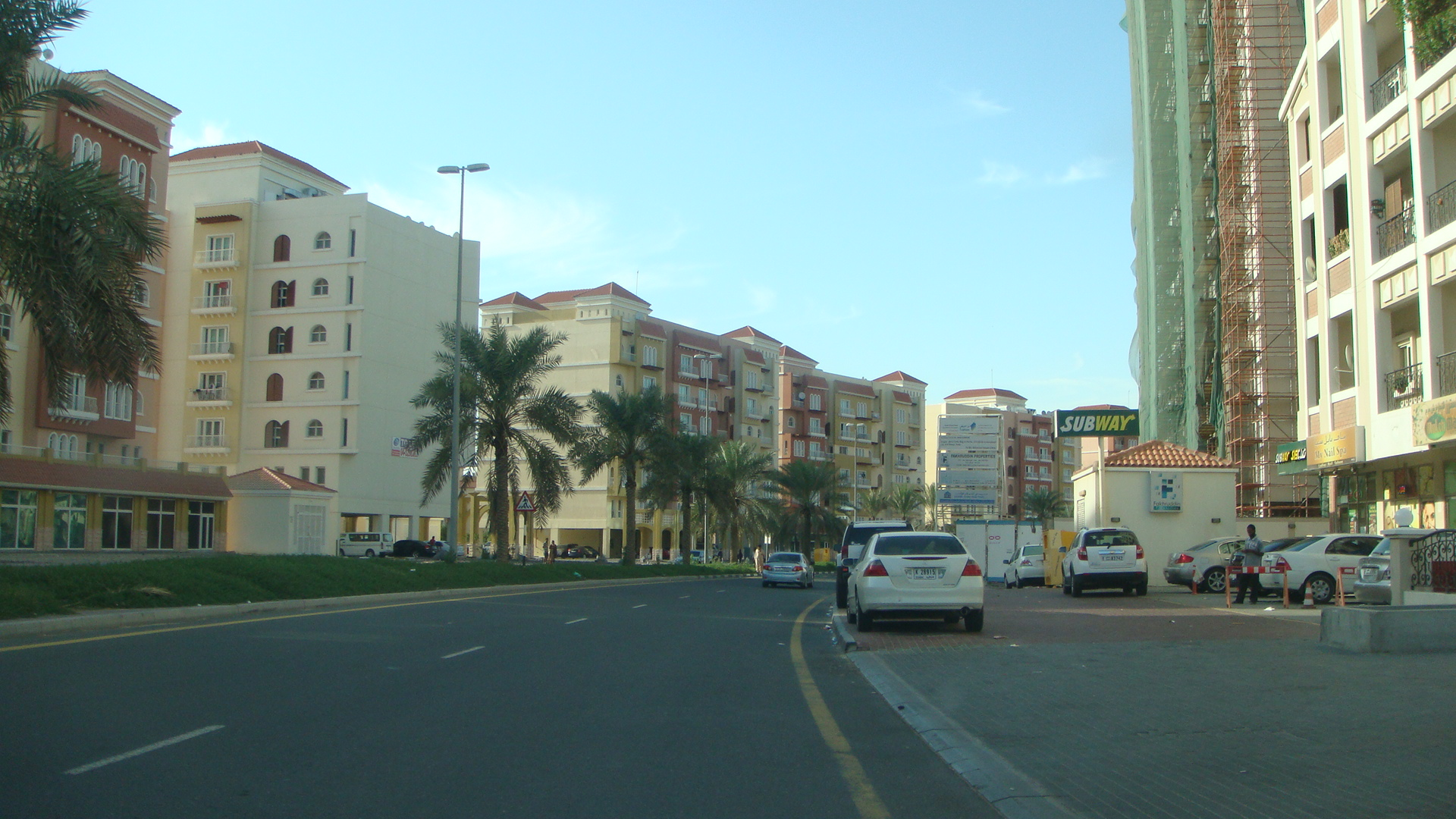
- View in the Spain Cluster at International City

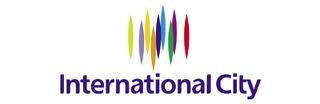
- Flag
- Nicknames: IC; IC Phase 1; Warsan 1; IC Dubai
- Interactive map of International City Phase 1, Dubai
- Coordinates: 25°8′31″N 55°24′17.06″E
- Country: United Arab Emirates
- Emirate: (Emirate of Dubai) Dubai
- City: Dubai
- Incorporated: July 10, 2004
- Founder: Nakheel Properties

Area
  - Total: 8.2 km^{2} (3.2 sq mi)
  - Land: 8.0 km^{2} (3.1 sq mi)
  - Water: 0.2 km^{2} (0.077 sq mi)

Population (Jan. 2010)
  - Total: 120,000
  - Rank: 117
  - Density: 15,000/km^{2} (39,000/sq mi)
- Time zone: UTC+4 (AST)
  - Summer (DST): UTC+4 (AST)
- Phone Code: +971 and 4
- FIPS code: (AE)10-4
- Website: www.internationalcity.ae

Dubai International City, otherwise called International City Phase 1, is a country-themed collection of residences, businesses, and tourist attractions. Spreading over an area of 800 hectares (8 million square meters), the arrangement of the city is inspired by the traditional carpets of the Middle East. Dubai International City is divided into multiple phases, each with its own set of residential and commercial clusters. Dubai International City is located in the Al Warsan region of Dubai, close to the Dubai Central Fruit and Vegetable Market.

== Description ==
The International City residential district is planned to have numerous country-specific and themed residential developments and retail outlets. The plans include ten country-specific districts (or "clusters"): China; England mirroring traditional London architecture; France district featuring residential blocks characterized by long French windows, red and grey bricks, and pilasters or half-columns; Persia district situated in the heart of the residential district; Greece district; Russia district, the northernmost residential district; Spain district featuring three- and four-storey buildings designed according to traditional stucco exterior finish; Morocco district; Italy district; Emirates district. The Central District includes building security, pools, private parking, gyms, parks, and shopping areas. Other areas include the Lake District.

Inspired by the Forbidden City of Beijing, China, a shopping mall covering an area of 240,000 square metres with parking facilities for 2,000 cars has been constructed to the north of the China Cluster. Chinamex's DragonMart, developed by Nakheel Properties, is a large mall for wholesale purchase of Chinese products. The mall has been a commercial success and a second mall has been constructed ("Dragon Mart 2"), adjacent to the original Dragon Mart 1, that has 175,000 square metres of space and 4,500 parking spaces. The project was completed in December 2015.

Launched in 2013, Warsan Village is located at the periphery of International City. This enclave within International City features 942 townhouses and 250 apartments. Construction was finished in Q3 2019.

There are a number of hospitals and medical clinics in the vicinity. For driving license-related (Road & Transport Authority Dubai) eye testing and medical tests for commercial taxi drivers or new drivers can be completed from Apple International Polyclinic. Recent regulations implemented by the Municipality of Dubai will greatly address the prevalence of Shisha [Arabic Tobacco] parlors housed in many buildings.

== History ==
While Nakheel's intentions were to make low and medium-cost housing available to the masses (who were suffering due to the real-estate boom until mid-2008 and before the GFC) by providing medium and low-income earners with legal and decent housing instead of resorting to illegitimate villa sharing, Dubai was badly affected by the Great Recession. While Dubai International City was not immune to these effects, the extent of the impact varied across different communities and types of properties. Generally, rental values and property prices decreased during this period, but the market gradually stabilized and started recovering in the following years. Due to this sudden drop in prices, even the extremely lowest income group (laborers, truck drivers, taxi drivers) identified this area as a potential upgrade to their existing labor camps. Coupled with Nakheel's financial downfall, controls and checks over the city's security, compliance to regulations and maintenance of infrastructure were dropped beginning in January 2009 by the developer who used to control and maintain this earlier.

In 2008, Dubai International City, like many other real estate developments in Dubai, faced challenges due to the Great Recession. Press reports stated that International City struggled These articles claim International City has struggled with a poor reputation and negative press reports stemming from various issues including problems with its own sewage systems and the nearby sewage facility, access to the site, and a perceived lack of amenities. A follow-up poll by Emirates 24/7 found that 91 percent of readers showed "a marked aversion to investing in International City units." Another 67 percent said they "would not touch the place". The issue was resolved by 2012.

Due to its proximity to the sewage treatment plant, and constant overflow, certain clusters like Morocco, Emirates and China are subjected to the odor of sewage when the wind direction changes at night. The area has experienced traffic congestion.

== Travel ==
The community is serviced by the RTA bus service.

=== Bus routes ===
- X23 Dubai Gold Souk Bus: Dubai International City ↔ Ras Al Khor ↔ Oud Metha ↔ Dubai Gold Souk. Operates on a 10 to 15-minute frequency.
- 365 Rashidiya Metro Station Bus: Dubai International City ↔ Silicon Oasis ↔ Dubai Academic City ↔ Rashidiya Metro Station. Operates on a 25 to 30-minute frequency.
- 53 Dubai Gold Souk Bus: Dubai International City ↔ Al Badia ↔ Dubai Festival City ↔ Deira City Centre ↔ Dubai Gold Souk. Operates on a 25 to 30-minute frequency.
- 366 Silicon Oasis Bus: Rashidiya Metro Station ↔ Dubai International City ↔ Silicon Oasis. Operates on a 20 to 30-minute frequency.

=== Dubai Metro ===
An International City 1 metro station on the Blue Line of the Dubai Metro is planned as an interchange station, together with a separate International City 2 & 3 metro station, in the neighboring Warsan 4 community.

Proposed services at International City 1
Preceding station	Dubai Metro	Following station
Car Mart towards Creek	Blue Line Creek branch Opening 2029	International City 2 & 3 towards Academic City
Dragon Mart towards Centrepoint	Blue Line Centrepoint branch Opening 2029	International City 2 & 3 towards Academic City
Proposed services at International City 2 & 3
International City 1 towards Creek or Centrepoint	Blue Line Opening 2029	Dubai Silicon Oasis towards Academic City

== Parking ==
Paid public parking in Dubai International City began on 1 February 2026, replacing previously free on-street parking in many parts of the community. The system operates daily from 08:00 to midnight, while parking remains free on Sundays and public holidays. Tariffs start at AED 2 for 30 minutes and increase progressively, with a maximum charge of AED 25 during chargeable hours. Residents of eligible buildings may obtain one complimentary residential parking permit per housing unit, while additional vehicles require paid parking or subscription plans. The scheme is administered by Parkin and was introduced to improve parking availability and manage congestion in the area.

== See also ==
- Developments in Dubai
- List of communities in Dubai
