= Dubai Silicon Oasis =

Free-trade zone in the UAE

Dubai Silicon Oasis واحة دبي للسيليكون
- City and Urban

Other transcription(s)
- The Dubai Silicon Oasis Headquarters
- Nickname: DSO
- Interactive map of Dubai Silicon Oasis
- Coordinates: 25°07′27″N 055°22′52″E
- Country: UAE
- Establishment: 2003

Area
  - Total: 7.2 km^{2} (2.8 sq mi)

Population (2020)
  - Total: 88,000
- Website: dsoa.ae

Dubai Silicon Oasis, known as DSO (Arabic: واحة دبي للسيليكون), is a free-trade zone established by the Dubai government in 2003, spanning an area of 7.2 square kilometers. It is located in the Nadd Hessa community in Dubai.

== History ==
In 2003, Sheikh Mohammed bin Rashid Al Maktoum, Vice President and Prime Minister of the United Arab Emirates and Ruler of Dubai, officially announced the Dubai Silicon Oasis to operate under the Dubai Airport Free Zone Authority. DSO formally opened in 2004 with the main aim of being a hub of innovation and technology, which is why it's called Silicon Oasis. It includes a thousand companies and is the only free zone where you can live and work. In 2005, Dubai Silicon Oasis was appointed as an independent authority according to Decree No. 16, and that Dubai Silicon Oasis Authority (DSOA) has received its land spanning an area of 7.2 square kilometers, to continue the establishment process of the DSO.

In 2006, the infrastructure of the DSO establishment was completed and recognized as a free-trade zone. In the same year, the construction of the first phase of the DSOA's Headquarters, the 560 Semmer Villas Project, road works, electricity, utilities, and telecommunications network was completed. In 2010, UPS Airlines Flight 6 nearly crashed into DSO. In 2015, DSOA established the Dubai Technology Entrepreneur Campus (Dtec), spanning a total area of approximately 60,000 square feet, then expanded the space to 108,000 square feet, thus allowing Dtec to host additional 800 startups. By the end of 2020, the DSOA became the home of more than 900 startups from 72 countries. In 2018, DSOA established Dubai's first integrated smart city project, the Dubai Digital Park (DDP). Spanning an area of 150,000 square meters and comprises 47,000 square meters of office space, 17,000 square meters of retail units, 235 smart residential apartments and more than 5,000 square meters of ready-made and plug and play offices.

Axiom Telecom office, in Silicon Oasis

The DSO Headquarters, also known as the Pineapple Building, was inaugurated by Narendra Modi. It serves as a hub for many corporate offices. The Walk-in Smart Police Station opened in October 2020 to provide 24-hour security services to residents and workers in the oasis. The station provides 46 services divided into 4 packages: security services, community services, traffic services, and certificates and permits services.

== Location ==
Dubai Silicon Oasis is located in Nadd Hessa, near the center of Dubai at the intersection of Dubai–Al-Ain Road and Sheikh Mohammed Bin Zayed Road.

== Education ==
In 2008, DSOA established the Rochester Institute of Technology of Dubai in DSO, a non-profit global campus of the Rochester Institute of Technology in Rochester, New York, as part of an agreement between DSOA and RIT-New York. DSO is also home to 3 schools: GEMS Wellington Academy, The Indian International School - DSO and Vernus International School.

== Sponsorship ==
DSOA has been the jersey sponsor of Shabab Al Ahli Basketball.

== Dubai Metro ==
There will be a Dubai Silicon Oasis metro station on the Blue Line in 2029.

Preceding station	Dubai Metro	Following station
International City 2 & 3 towards Creek or Centrepoint	Blue Line Opening 2029	Academic City Terminus
