= Rochester Institute of Technology of Dubai =

Branch campus of New York's RIT in the UAE

- Seal of the Rochester Institute of Technology
- Type: Satellite campus of Rochester Institute of Technology
- Established: 2008
- Affiliations: Rochester Institute of Technology
- President: Yousef Al-Assaf
- Vice-president: Khalid Khawaja
- Academic staff: 130
- Administrative staff: 107
- Students: 2200
- Undergraduates: 2000
- Postgraduates: 200
- Location: Dubai Silicon Oasis, Dubai, UAE; 25.1310755°N 55.3893928°E
- Campus: Urban
- Colors: Orange and Brown
- Nickname: Tigers
- Mascot: RITchie (Tiger)
- Website: rit.edu/dubai
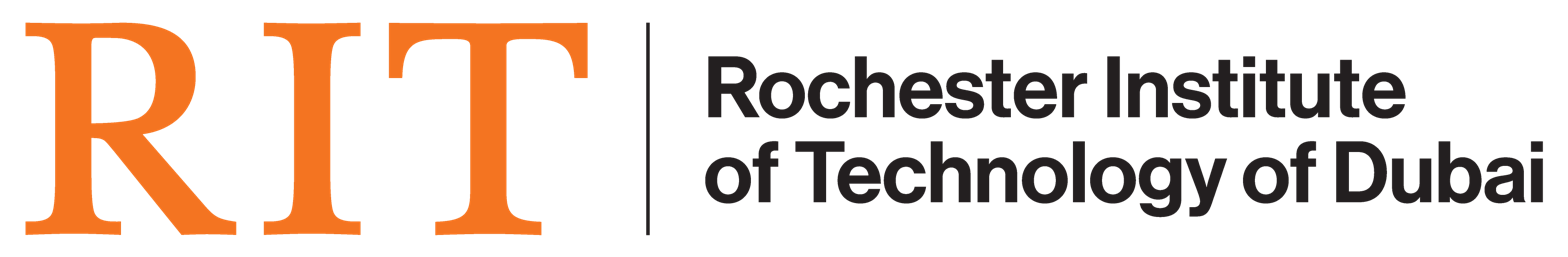

The Rochester Institute of Technology of Dubai (RIT Dubai) is a satellite campus of Rochester Institute of Technology, New York, USA, in Dubai, United Arab Emirates. The college is located in the Dubai Silicon Oasis and started offering part-time graduate courses in Fall 2008. In 2009, the university began its full-time graduate program. RIT Dubai's first graduating class was in 2010, with the graduation ceremony taking place in Rochester, NY. In 2010, a full-time undergraduate program was started as part of the university's planned expansion. In the fall of 2011, RIT Dubai moved its campus to a new premises to accommodate the growing student body. By 2019, RIT plans to expand the campus to 1,000,000 square feet (93,000 m^{2}) to provide facilities for 4,000 students.

The RIT Dubai campus is the Rochester Institute of Technology's third international campus. The university's other satellite campuses are RIT Croatia and RIT Kosovo.

== History ==
Rochester Institute of Technology of Dubai was established in Dubai Silicon Oasis in 2008 to provide quality higher education in the region. It has bachelors and masters programs for students and professionals in Middle East, North Africa and South East Asia.

The founding president of RIT Dubai is Mustafa A.G. Abushagur. who led the efforts to establish a satellite campus in the middle east. He mediated the negotiations between the Rochester Institute of Technology and the government of the United Arab Emirates to set up a campus at the Dubai Silicon Oasis in Dubai, UAE.

Rochester Institute of Technology of Dubai became the symbol of the understanding between RIT president William W. Destler and officials from Dubai. The Dubai Silicon Oasis Authority invited Rochester Institute of Technology to ensure a pool of skilled hi-tech professionals in the community. On the other hand, it provided RIT with a chance to act on its strategic plan to enhance global opportunities for their students and extend their platform.

In 2013, Dr. Youssef Al Assaf was appointed as the new president of Rochester Institute of Technology of Dubai following the leave of Mustafa A.G. Abushagur who became the first elected prime minister in the modern history of Libya.

In February 2019, His Highness Sheikh Ahmed bin Saeed Al Maktoum, Chairman of Dubai Silicon Oasis Authority (DSOA) marked the commencement of the construction works of the new RIT Dubai campus. The 500 million AED project is scheduled for completion in 2023, with a first phase planned to be achieved by Q1 2020.

== Academics ==
The academic programs offered by Rochester Institute of Technology of Dubai are the same as those offered at the New York campus and all students earn the same degree as those studying at Rochester Institute of Technology in New York. All programs have been approved and accredited by the Commission for Academic Accreditation of the Ministry of Higher Education and Scientific Research (MOHESR) in the UAE.

=== Undergraduate programs ===
RIT Dubai began offering Bachelor of Science degrees in fall 2010 with a range of major program options and concentrations. The different majors offered at RIT Dubai are:

- Business
  - Management
  - Marketing
  - International Business
  - Finance
- Engineering
  - Electrical Engineering
  - Mechanical Engineering
  - Microelectronics Engineering – 2+2 Program – Spend 2 years in Dubai studying Electrical Engineering + 2 years completing your degree in NY campus studying Microelectronics Engineering.
  - Industrial Engineering
- Computing & Information Sciences
  - Computer Security
  - Computing & Information Technologies

These undergraduate programs are designed for full-time study wherein students combine practical experience with academic foundations and an emphasis on modern and newly developed technologies. Students have the opportunity to study abroad at the New York campus and fulfill part of their degree requirements by attending classes there.

=== Graduate programs ===
Rochester Institute of Technology of Dubai began offering graduate degree programs in September 2008 in several different disciplines. The master's programs have been selected to support the need for professional development, economic growth and human capital development in Dubai and the Persian Gulf region. All masters programs are part-time programs and classes are offered in a variety of formats and timings to accommodate convenience for working professionals.

The Masters programs offered are:

- Service Leadership and Innovation
- Networking and Systems administration
- Electrical engineering
- Mechanical engineering
- Engineering management
- Professional studies: City science, pending approval from the Ministry of Higher Education & Scientific Research

English Language Center

- The English Language Center also offers English Courses for professionals, personal interest, international students and RIT Dubai Students.

=== Accreditation ===
Rochester Institute of Technology of Dubai offers internationally recognized degrees that are issued through its parent campus RIT in New York. The certification is accredited by the Commission for Academic Accreditation of the Ministry of Higher Education and Scientific Research (MOHESR) in the UAE for all its Master's and Bachelor's programs, Engineering Programs at Rochester Institute of Technology, Dubai are also accredited by ABET. as well as the US Department of Education, which has led to a significant increase in the number of students enrolling at the university.

Rochester Institute of Technology of Dubai is licensed by the Knowledge and Human Development Authority the regulatory authority of the Emirate of Dubai that is responsible for the growth, direction and quality of private education and learning in Dubai.

Rochester Institute of Technology is chartered by the New York state legislature and accredited by: Middle States Commission on Higher Education (MSCHE) and by the New York State Education Department.

In addition to institutional accreditation, bachelors and masters programs of the Rochester Institute of Technology in New York in engineering and business are accredited by accreditation bodies such as American Board of Engineering and Technology (ABET) and Association of Advance Collegiate Schools of Business (AACSB).

== Awards ==
There are two awards given to students from the graduating class each year at RIT Dubai's Commencement Ceremony.

=== President's Cup award ===
- Each year one graduating undergraduate student is awarded the President's Cup, one of the most prestigious awards given in the university. The awardee is selected by a Committee through a process that takes into consideration academic, extracurricular, and leadership achievements. This student is recognized at the RIT Dubai Commencement Ceremony and will have his/her name engraved on the President's Cup plaque. Additionally, the President's Cup awardee will be invited to represent RIT Dubai as the Student Delegate at the Commencement Ceremony in Rochester NY. The awardee carries the RIT Dubai banner and sits on stage for Convocation as well as their College Ceremony.
- Past winners of the President's Cup award:
  - Syed Siddique (2014–2015)
  - Yara Hattab (2015–2016)
  - Mashal Waqar (2016–2017)
  - Raina Zakir (2017–2018)
  - Ronald Noronha & Mohammad Yousefi (2018–2019)
  - Irina Palaioudi (2019–2020)
  - Dristi Dinesh (2020–2021)
  - Kriz George (2021–2022)
  - Supreeta Olivera (2022–2023)

=== Valedictorian award ===
This is awarded to one graduating undergraduate student with the highest GPA.

Past winners of the Valedictorian award:

- Fouzana Feroze (2014–2015)
- Essa Al-Shahei (2016–2017)
- Christabelle Alvares (2020-2021)
- Laith Hiasat (2022–2023)

== Facilities and services ==
Rochester Institute of Technology of Dubai provides facilities that include engineering and computing labs, a bookstore, a fitness center, outdoor and indoor sports facilities, a cafeteria, and a library.

- The library has an onsite collection of 3,000 volumes. In addition, RIT Dubai students have access to over 125,000 electronic books, 50,000 electronic journals, and 250 databases from the main campus library in Rochester, New York.
- RIT Dubai students in need of accommodation are housed at the Dubai Silicon Oasis Accommodation approximately five minutes from campus. This facility, which was opened in August 2016, comprehensively meets all student needs, including areas for study, recreation, dining, and fun. Shuttles to and from the main campus building depart at multiple times daily, and there are buses that transport students to select malls and metro stations.
- Transportation is provided to students if needed. RIT Dubai offers daily pickups for any student living in Dubai, Sharjah, Ajman, or the city of Abu Dhabi. Bus routes have several convenient pick-up locations in neighborhoods and suburbs nationwide, with buses arriving at the RIT Dubai before classes begin at 9:00 AM. Buses depart RIT Dubai between 5:00 and 5:15 PM daily.

== Activities on campus ==
=== Events ===
==== University Challenge ====
RIT Dubai University Competition is the main event that occurs on an annual basis on campus. High school students are invited to participate in various competitions in Knowledge, Engineering and Business. The winners of the competition win a scholarship to pursue their education at RIT Dubai.

==== Orientation days ====
At the beginning of the academic year in Fall semester, the university holds the orientation on days where students are introduced to the ins and outs of the university, register for classes and take the Math and English placement tests.

==== Counselor workshops ====
The counselor workshop aims at providing high school representatives with the right tools to make sure their students pick the right university whether they are heading abroad to various places such the US, Canada, the UK or even staying here in UAE.

=== Student life ===
==== Student government ====
The student government (SG) elections for president and vice president took place on May 1, 2013 to represent the entire student body of the university and assist the Student Services department in all student related tasks. The elections for representatives took place in the first week October. The rest of the positions in the Student Government are External Communication Officer, Internal Communications Officer, Events Organizer, Athletics Director and the Treasurer and Secretary. Candidates applying for these posts are appointed.

The Student Government at RIT Dubai is one of the most active student entities in the university.

Previous Student Government President and Vice President leaderships include:

- Rabeet Khan and Yara Hattab (2013–2014)
- Yara Hattab and Tarun Yenna (2014–2015)
- Mashal Waqar and Mohammad Yousefi (2015–2016)
- Omar Adel and Kareem Hassan (2016–2017)
- Ioana Ifrim and Ira Palaioudi (2017–2018)
- Ronald Noronha and Judy Akbik (2018–2019)
- Bashir Khadra Jr and Umara Tahir (2024-2025)
- Begad Moussa and Mariia Komkova (2025 - 2026)

==== WRITERS magazine ====
WRITERS is RIT Dubai's first student-run publication. It's an online and print magazine with over 1000 copies circulated at RIT Dubai and around Dubai Silicon Oasis. The WRITERS initiative was started by the RIT Dubai Marketing Club and its purpose was to give a platform to the most opinionated voices of RIT Dubai. It's been instrumental in bringing forward key issues that students feel strongly about. Issue 1 was released in May 2015 and issue 2 was released in May 2016.

Issue 2 covers two-time Oscar winner Sharpen Obaid-Chinoy, for her ground-breaking work in making documentary films about issues considered taboo in Pakistan. The editor-in-chief for both issues was Mashal Waqar. The sub-editors for issue 2 were Dana Osman, Bushra Siddiqui, and Junaid Seraj and Raina Zakir was the designer.

==== Sports Club ====
The Sports Club participated in the Dubai International Academic City (DIAC) Sports Cup 2013. About forty-five students took part in all sporting activities including basketball, volleyball, table tennis, athletics, football, cricket, tennis, squash, badminton and swimming.

==== Palestinian Cultural Club ====
The Palestinian Cultural Club was created in 2012 with the goal to represent the Palestinian community at RIT Dubai. Its main aim is to preserve the Palestinian history, heritage, and revive the culture. We also aim to communicate with the different Palestinian organizations and figures inside and outside UAE, and to connect the Palestinian community in the UAE to the Palestinian community in Palestine. One of the current projects that the club has started a charity campaign Donate to Educate to help educate students in Palestine.

===== Events =====
- The first event was the inauguration of the club where the General Consul of Palestine was invited for this opening ceremony of the club, followed by a rich night with the Palestinian Folklore.
- The club attended a charity dinner event at Atlantis that was organized by the General Consulate of the State of Palestine for the financial support box of the President of Palestine Mahmmoud Abbas to aid the Palestinian students in Lebanon.
- The club held the event RIT got Talent.
- Members attended the PCRF charity marathon which was organized by Standard Charter and held in Dubai Mall Boulevard.
- The club started a charity campaign Donate to Educate to help educate students in Palestine.
- Attended the DSO Bazaar for the charity campaign Donate to Educate.
- The club wanted to expand the charity campaign to get more support of people within the UAE, with the collaboration with the General Consulate of the State of Palestine and the other Palestinian Clubs in the UAE; the PCC-RIT could held an event "Voices from the Heart of the Land" on the same day of "Yawm Al-Ard/The Land Day" to help the blind children in Palestine.

==== Arab Orients Club ====
The Arab Orients Club was created in March 2012 to introduce the different Arab cultures of the world to the universities in the United Arab Emirates. The Arab Orients Club held an "all you can eat" event in April 2013 with the participation of staff and students.

==== The Humanitarian Club ====
The RIT Dubai Humanitarian Club was created in 2011 for students who share the common interest to collaborate and work towards making the community a better place. The club collaborated with the Sharjah book shelter in early 2012.

== Accessibility ==
Rochester Institute of Technology of Dubai is located in Dubai Silicon Oasis, a technology park located between Academic City and Mirdiff City Center. The University is about 15 minutes away from the Dubai International Airport, and 15 minutes away from the student housing, Etisalat Academy. Weekly ASL classes were organized by the Student Government in 2016, organized by Mashal Waqar and Asher Kirschbaum, in efforts to make the campus more deaf-friendly.

== People ==
Institute presidents
Name	Tenure
Mustafa A.G. Abushagur	2008–2012
Luther Troell (Interim)	2012–2013
Yousef Al-Assaf	2013 – present

== See also ==
- Americans in the United Arab Emirates
