= Terminal 1 station =

Terminal 1 station can refer to these metro stations at various airport passenger terminals termed Terminal 1:

- Narita Airport Terminal 1 Station, Japan
- Toronto Pearson Terminal 1 station, Toronto, Canada
- Terminal 1–Lindbergh station, Minneapolis–Saint Paul International Airport
- Terminal 1 IGI Airport metro station, Delhi Metro, India
- Haneda Airport Terminal 1 Station, Japan
- Hongqiao Airport Terminal 1 station, Shanghai, China
- Airport Terminal 1 (Dubai Metro), United Arab Emirates
- Airport Terminal 1 metro station (Taiwan), Taoyuan International Airport
- Lambert Airport Terminal 1 station, St. Louis, Missouri
- Terminal 1 (Mexico City Metrobús), a BRT station in Mexico City

== See also ==
- Terminal One (disambiguation)
