= Geography of Dubai =

This time-lapse video shows the rate of Dubai's growth at one frame per year from 2000 through 2011. In the false-colour satellite images making up the video, bare desert is tan, plant-covered land is red, water is black and urban areas are silver.

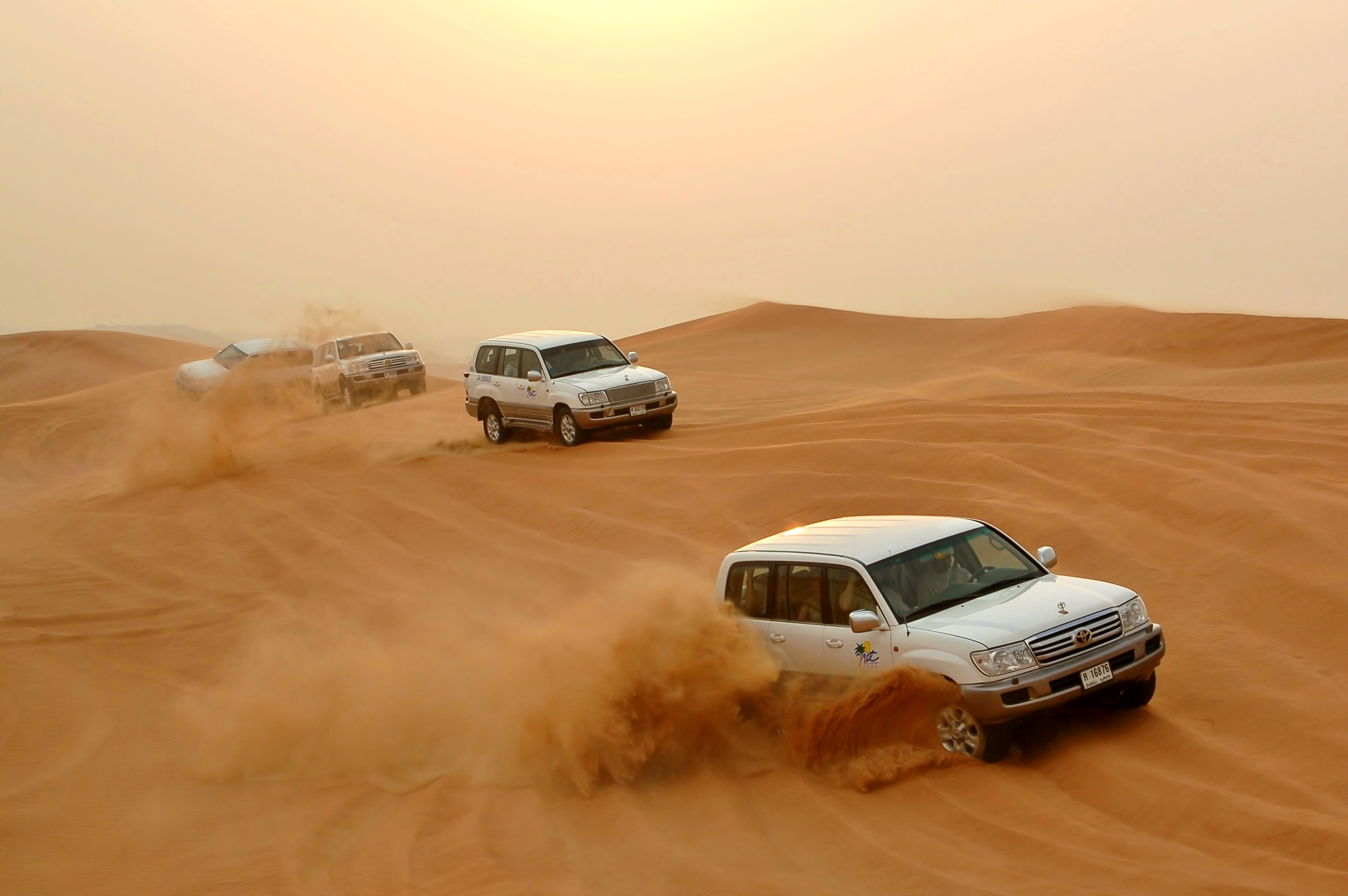
Dune bashing in one of the deserts of Dubai

Dubai is situated on the Persian Gulf coast of the United Arab Emirates and is roughly at sea level (16 m or 52 ft above). The emirate of Dubai shares borders with Abu Dhabi in the south, Sharjah in the northeast, and the Sultanate of Oman in the . Hatta, a minor exclave of the emirate, is surrounded on three sides by Oman and by the emirates of Ajman (in the west) and Ras Al Khaimah (in the north). The Persian Gulf borders the western coast of the emirate. Dubai is positioned at 25.2697°N 55.3095°E and covers an area of 1,588 sq mi (4,110 km^{2}), which represents a significant expansion beyond its initial 1,500 sq mi (3,900 km^{2}) designation due to land reclamation from the sea.

Dubai lies directly within the Arabian Desert. However, the topography of Dubai is significantly different from that of the southern portion of the UAE in that much of Dubai's landscape is highlighted by sandy desert patterns, while gravel deserts dominate much of the southern region of the country. The sand consists mostly of crushed shell and coral and is fine, clean and white. East of the city, the salt-crusted coastal plains, known as sabkha, give way to a north–south running line of dunes. Farther east, the dunes grow larger and are tinged red with iron oxide.

The flat sandy desert gives way to the Western Hajar Mountains, which run alongside Dubai's border with Oman at Hatta. The Western Hajar chain has an arid, jagged and shattered landscape, whose mountains rise to about 1,300 metres (4,265 feet) in some places. Dubai has no natural river bodies or oases; however, Dubai does have a natural inlet, Dubai Creek, which has been dredged to make it deep enough for large vessels to pass through. Dubai also has multiple gorges and waterholes, which dot the base of the Western Al Hajar mountains. A vast sea of sand dunes covers much of southern Dubai and eventually leads into the desert known as The Empty Quarter. Seismically, Dubai is in a very stable zone—the nearest seismic fault line, the Zagros Fault, is 200 kilometres (124 miles) from the UAE and is unlikely to have any seismic impact on Dubai. Experts also predict that the possibility of a tsunami in the region is minimal because the Persian Gulf waters are not deep enough to trigger a tsunami.

== Fauna and flora ==
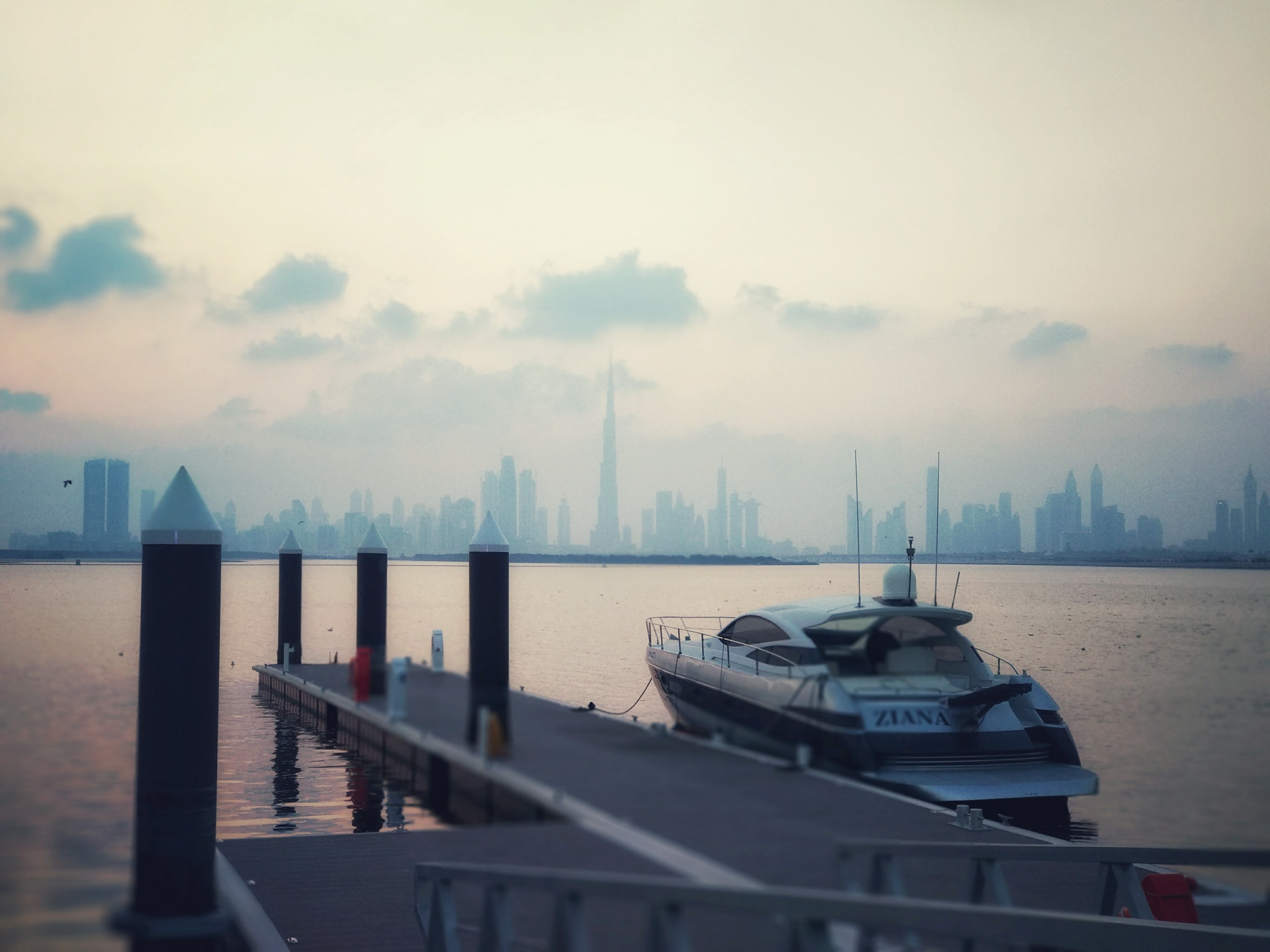
A view of the Dubai Creek from a harbour

The sandy desert surrounding the city supports wild grasses and occasional date palms. Desert hyacinths grow in the sabkha plains east of the city, while acacia and ghaf trees grow in the flat plains within the proximity of the Western Al Hajar mountains. Several indigenous trees such as the date palm and neem as well as imported trees such as the eucalyptus grow in Dubai's natural parks. The MacQueen's bustard, striped hyena, caracal, desert fox, falcon and Arabian oryx are common in Dubai's desert. Dubai is on the migration path between Europe, Asia and Africa, and more than 320 migratory bird species pass through the emirate in spring and autumn. The waters of Dubai are home to more than 300 species of fish, including the hammour. The typical marine life off the Dubai coast includes tropical fish, jellyfish, coral, dugong, dolphins, whales and sharks. Various types of turtles can also be found in the area including the hawksbill turtle and green turtle, which are listed as endangered species.

== Urban areas ==
Dubai Creek runs northeast–southwest through the city. The eastern section of the city forms the locality of Deira and is flanked by the emirate of Sharjah in the east and the town of Al Aweer in the south. The Dubai International Airport is located south of Deira, while the Palm Deira is located north of Deira in the Persian Gulf. Much of Dubai's real-estate boom is concentrated to the west of Dubai Creek, on the Jumeirah coastal belt. Port Rashid, Jebel Ali, Burj Al Arab, the Palm Jumeirah and theme-based free-zone clusters such as Business Bay are all located in this section. Dubai is notable for sculpted artificial island complexes including the Palm Islands and The World archipelago.

== Climate ==
Dubai has a hot desert climate (Köppen BWh). Summers in Dubai are extremely hot, prolonged, windy, and humid, with an average high around 40 °C (104 °F) and overnight lows around 30 °C (86 °F) in the hottest month, August. Most days are sunny throughout the year. Winters are comparatively cool, though mild to warm, with an average high of 24 °C (75 °F) and overnight lows of 14 °C (57 °F) in January, the coolest month. Precipitation, however, has been increasing in the last few decades, with accumulated rain reaching 110.7 mm (4.36 in) per year. Dubai summers are also known for the very high humidity level, which can make it very uncomfortable for many with exceptionally high dew points in summer. Heat index values can reach over 60 °C (140 °F) at the height of summer. The highest recorded temperature in Dubai is 48.8 °C (119.8 °F).

Climate data for Dubai (1977–2015 normals)
Month	Jan	Feb	Mar	Apr	May	Jun	Jul	Aug	Sep	Oct	Nov	Dec	Year
Record high °C (°F)	31.8 (89.2)	37.5 (99.5)	41.3 (106.3)	43.5 (110.3)	47.0 (116.6)	47.9 (118.2)	48.5 (119.3)	48.8 (119.8)	45.1 (113.2)	42.4 (108.3)	38.0 (100.4)	33.2 (91.8)	48.8 (119.8)
Mean daily maximum °C (°F)	23.9 (75.0)	25.4 (77.7)	28.9 (84.0)	33.3 (91.9)	37.7 (99.9)	39.8 (103.6)	40.9 (105.6)	41.3 (106.3)	38.9 (102.0)	35.4 (95.7)	30.6 (87.1)	26.2 (79.2)	33.5 (92.3)
Daily mean °C (°F)	19.1 (66.4)	20.5 (68.9)	23.6 (74.5)	27.5 (81.5)	31.4 (88.5)	33.4 (92.1)	35.5 (95.9)	35.9 (96.6)	33.3 (91.9)	29.8 (85.6)	25.4 (77.7)	21.2 (70.2)	28.1 (82.5)
Mean daily minimum °C (°F)	14.3 (57.7)	15.5 (59.9)	18.3 (64.9)	21.7 (71.1)	25.1 (77.2)	27.3 (81.1)	30.0 (86.0)	30.4 (86.7)	27.7 (81.9)	24.1 (75.4)	20.1 (68.2)	16.3 (61.3)	22.6 (72.6)
Record low °C (°F)	7.7 (45.9)	7.4 (45.3)	11.0 (51.8)	13.7 (56.7)	15.7 (60.3)	21.3 (70.3)	24.1 (75.4)	24.0 (75.2)	22.0 (71.6)	15.0 (59.0)	10.8 (51.4)	8.2 (46.8)	7.4 (45.3)
Average precipitation mm (inches)	18.8 (0.74)	25.0 (0.98)	22.1 (0.87)	7.2 (0.28)	0.4 (0.02)	0.0 (0.0)	0.8 (0.03)	0.0 (0.0)	0.0 (0.0)	1.1 (0.04)	2.7 (0.11)	16.2 (0.64)	94.3 (3.71)
Average precipitation days	5.5	4.7	5.8	2.6	0.3	0.0	0.5	0.5	0.1	0.2	1.3	3.8	25.3
Mean monthly sunshine hours	251	241	270	306	350	345	332	326	309	307	279	254	3,570
Mean daily sunshine hours	8.1	8.6	8.7	10.2	11.3	11.5	10.7	10.5	10.3	9.9	9.3	8.2	9.8
Source 1: Dubai Meteorological Office
Source 2: UAE National Center of Meteorology
