= Terminal 1 =

Terminal 1 may refer to:

- Heathrow Terminal 1, England
- Terminal 1 (album), a 2004 album by jazz saxophonist/composer Benny Golson
- Terminal 1 (Vancouver, Washington), United States

== See also ==
- Terminal 1 station (disambiguation)
