= Emirates (Dubai Metro) =

Metro station in Dubai, United Arab Emirates

Emirates الإمارات

General information
- Location: Dubai International Airport; Garhoud, Dubai; United Arab Emirates
- Coordinates: 25.2410°N 55.3656°E
- Operator: Dubai Metro
- Line: Red Line
- Platforms: 2 side platforms
- Tracks: 2
- Connections: RTA Dubai: 24 Al Nahda 2 - Int'l City; 32C Al Qusais Stn - Al Satwa Stn; 77 Baniyas Square MS - Airport 3 / RTA HQ; F8 Dubai Festival City - Al Nahda 2; F62 Emirates MS - Nadd Al Hamar

Construction
- Accessible: yes

Other information
- Station code: 12
- Fare zone: 5

History
- Opened: April 30, 2010

Passengers
- 2011: 1,424,293

Services
Preceding station	Dubai Metro	Following station
Airport Terminal 3 towards Expo 2020 or Life Pharmacy	Red Line	Centrepoint Terminus
Location

Emirates (Arabic: طيران الإمارات) is a rapid transit station on the Red Line of the Dubai Metro in Dubai, UAE. It is located very close to Dubai International Airport. The station is connected to the entrance of the Emirates Group headquarters, hence the name.

== History ==
The station was not one of the initial stations of the Dubai Metro, when the Red Line opened on 9 September 2009 with trains running to Nakheel Harbour and Tower with seven intermediate stations. However, it opened the year after on 30 April 2010.

== Station layout ==
Emirates station has two side platforms and two tracks.

=== Platform layout ===
G	Street level	Exit/Entrance
L1	Concourse	Automatic Fare Collection gates, station agent, crossover
L2	Side platform | Doors will open on the right
L2	Platform 1 Eastbound	Towards ← Centrepoint; Change at the next station for M4
L2	Platform 2 Westbound	Towards → Life Pharmacy / Expo 2020; Next Station: Airport Terminal 3
L2	Side platform | Doors will open on the right
