= Dubai Central Fruit and Vegetable Market =

Wholesale fruit and vegetable market in Dubai, United Arab Emirates

Dubai Central Fruit and Vegetable Market Al Aweer market
- Interactive map of Dubai Central Fruit and Vegetable Market; Al Aweer market
- Native name: سوق الخضار والفواكه العوير (Arabic)
- Owner: Dubai Municipality
- Length: 1.93 kilometres (6,300 ft)
- Width: 1 kilometre (3,300 ft)
- Location: Ras Al Khor 3, Dubai
- Coordinates: 25.1716703°N 55.3886453°E

Construction
- Inauguration: 3 July 2004

Dubai Central Fruit and Vegetable Market also known as Al Aweer market, Dubai Municipality Fruit and Vegetable Market and 'Ras Al Khor Fruit and Vegetable Market' (Arabic: سوق الخضار والفواكه العوير) is the wholesale market controlled by Dubai Municipality. It is located on Ras Al Khor 3, bordered by Al Awir, central Dubai near Sheikh Mohammad Bin Zayed Road, Dubai United Arab Emirates.

== History ==
Al Aweer Central Fruit and Vegetable Market first opened on 3 July 2004. It is the biggest Fruit and Vegetable Market in the Gulf countries with an area of 100 hectares. The market is the hub of the fruit and vegetable trade in the United Arab Emirates region. Most of the fresh fruit and vegetable traders operate from only here. It supplies fruits and vegetables to all over the United Arab Emirates
