= Dragon Mart =

Two shopping malls in Dubai, UAE

Dragon Mart 1 & 2
- سوق التنين
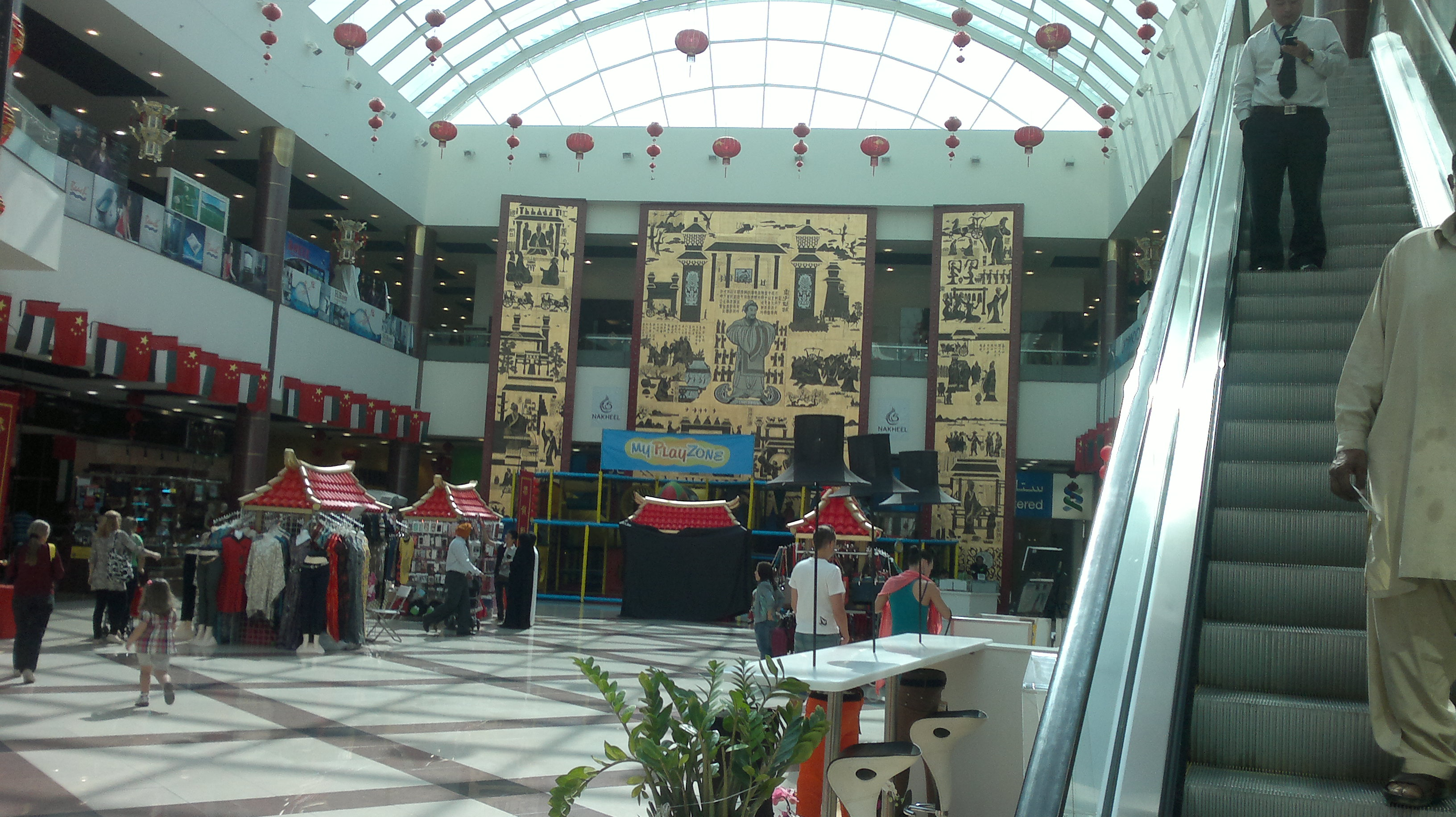
- Entrance hall of Dragon Mart 1
- Location: Dubai, United Arab Emirates
- Coordinates: 25.17391°N 55.41788°E
- Address: Al Awir Road, Dubai International City, Warsan First
- Opened: 1: 2004; 2: 2015
- Developer: Nakheel Properties
- Manager: Chinamex
- Num. of stores: 3,500 stores 52 restaurants
- Floor area: 1: 240,000 m^{2} 2: 175,000 m^{2}
- Floors: 1: 1–2 levels 2: 2 levels
- Parking: 1: 2,000 spaces 2: 4,500 spaces
- Public transit: Bus transport connecting to Centrepoint metro station
- Website: dragonmart.ae
- Note that there are two adjacent malls: Dragon Mart 1 and Dragon Mart 2

Dragon Mart (Arabic: سوق التنين) is a set of two adjacent shopping malls in Dubai International City (Phase 1), a suburb of Dubai, United Arab Emirates. Dragon Mart is 1 kilometre long and is the "largest Chinese retail trading hub outside mainland China". It is includes the largest concentration of Chinese businesses in the UAE, while Dragon Mart 2 was designed to complement the first building.

== Overview ==
There are two Dragon Mart malls in separate buildings next to each other. The original Dragon Mart 1 shops are organized in various sections for each type of market, such as furniture, textiles, household items, lighting equipment, sports and garments, etc. The newer Dragon Mart 2 is more like a traditional shopping mall with four sections covering general merchandise, building materials, home appliances, and hardware and machinery. Dragon Mart is located south of Al Awir Road (E 44) and east of Sheikh Mohammad Bin Zayed Road (E 311). Both Dragon Marts are north of the China Cluster, an area in Dubai International City Phase 1, with Dragon Mart Sun Tour, ibis Styles and a Premiere Inn hotel build adjacent to them.

== Dragon Mart 1 ==
The original mall, for the wholesale purchase of Chinese products, was the first to be developed by Chinamex as a key project in the expansion of Chinese ties in the Persian Gulf countries. Inspired by the Forbidden City of Beijing, the original Dragon Mart 1 covers an area of 240,000 square metres with parking facilities for 2,000 cars, dating from 2004. Dragon Mart was developed by Nakheel Properties in association with Chinamex.

== Dragon Mart 2 ==
The first mall's commercial success led to the construction of a second mall, Dragon Mart 2, adjacent to the original Dragon Mart mall, covering 175,000 square metres of space and with 4,500 parking spaces. The project was completed in December 2015, and the mall was inaugurated by His Highness Sheikh Mohammed bin Rashid Al Maktoum on 9 February 2016. As the mall was handed to Dubai Retail [alongside Nakheel], it continues to make a steady recovery after operational hurdles.

== Dragon City Bahrain ==
In September 2013, Chinamex signed a memorandum of understanding with the Diyar Al Muharraq authorities for the construction of a 120,000 m2 wholesale and retail mall entertainment complex in Bahrain branded as Dragon City. Nass Corporation was commissioned to build the mall. With an investment of $100 million, the Dragon City opened in December 2015. Characterized by its oriental architecture, it also included 300 residential apartments. Dragon City Bahrain is a first-of-its-kind development that encompasses over 787 commercial units, making it the largest wholesale and retail trading centre in the Kingdom of Bahrain.

Six months after opening, 95% of store occupancy was reached. In November 2016, Chinamex allocated an extra $200 million to roll out the second part of the project: a palatial hotel, restaurants area, and a recreational area.

== Dragon Mart Cancún ==
In conjunction with Mexican investors, Chinamex commenced construction of Dragon Mart Cancún, a $US180-million investment that includes 3,000 storefronts, along with apartments for the families of mall workers. ONGs and national institutions heavily criticized the project as soon as it was announced in 2011, arguing that the Mexican government did not conduct environmental impact assessments. Facing bad publicity, Chinamex rearranged its deal with its Mexican partners, allowing more countries to partake in the project, reducing the number of units reserved to Chinese businessmen, and giving up 10% of its 50-50 investment deal to the Mexican investors (60% MX, 40% CN). The project was approved on government and state levels by the end of 2012, but local authorities blocked and completely reversed the approval on all government levels.

Construction was then halted due to an environmental enforcement action by Profepa, the Mexican environmental protection agency. Dragon Mart was fined $555,000 in 2014 by Profepa for neglecting the conduction of environmental impact assessments. In January 2015, Profepa canceled the project and fined Dragon Mart an additional $1.5 million. An article in The Wall Street Journal noted that the planned DragonMart had unsettled Mexican business leaders who were anxious about losing market share to Chinese competition.

== See also ==
- Chinese people in the United Arab Emirates
