= Diyar Al Muharraq =

Complex of artificial islands in Bahrain

Diyar Al Muharraq Islands
Native name: جزيرة ديار المحرق
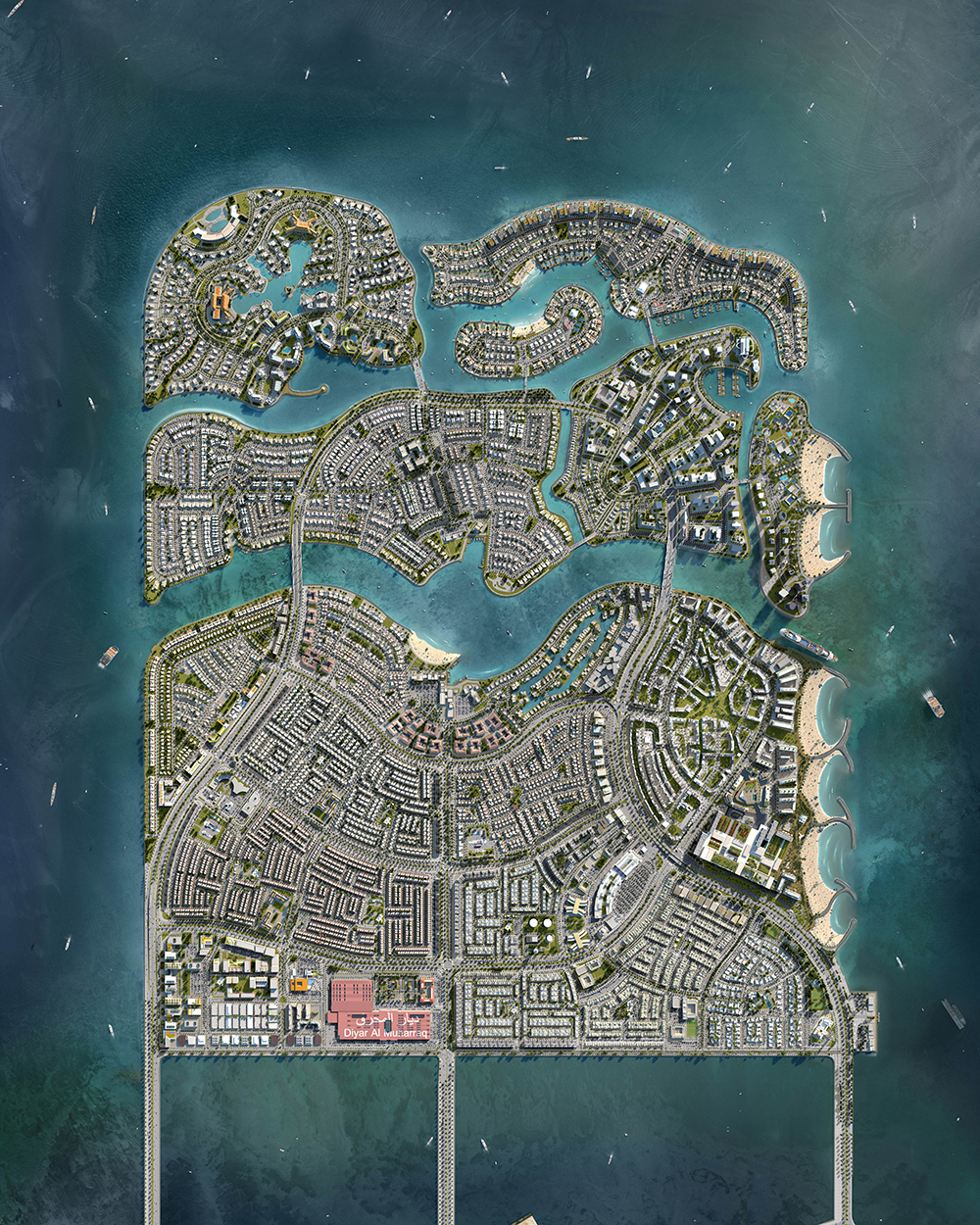
- Conceptual image of the planned development at Diyar Al Muharraq
- Interactive map of Diyar Al Muharraq Islands

Geography
- Location: Persian Gulf
- Coordinates: 26.31°N 50.63°E
- Archipelago: Bahrain
- Adjacent to: Persian Gulf
- Total islands: 7
- Major islands: Diyar; Sarata
- Area: 12.00 km^{2} (4.63 sq mi)
- Length: 3.9 km (2.42 mi)
- Width: 3.4 km (2.11 mi)

Administration
- Bahrain
- Governorate: Muharraq Governorate
- Largest settlement: Diyar Al Muharraq

Demographics
- Demonym: Bahraini
- Ethnic groups: Bahraini, non-Bahraini

Additional information
- Time zone: AST (UTC+3)
- ISO code: BH-15
- Official website: www.diyar.bh/en

Diyar Al Muharraq (Arabic: ديار المحرق) is a complex of seven artificial islands in the archipelago of Bahrain, located 10.5 km (6.5 mi) northeast of the capital, Manama, on Bahrain Island.

== History ==
It is named after the nearby Muharraq Island. In December 2015 Dragon City Mall, a Chinese-themed shopping center operated by Chinamex, was completed on the islands. In January 2016, the development of the luxury-themed Marassi Residences within the islands' Marassi Al Bahrain complex was announced, with completion planned in 2018.

== Demography ==
Diyar Al Muharraq covers seven artificial islands that are designed to be a self-contained city with commercial and residential facilities. The islands began to be inhabited in 2015. The current population number is unknown.

== Administration ==
Diyar Al Muharraq is a modern integrated city located on the northern tip of Muharraq Island in Bahrain. The city is a master-planned development and is designed to be a self-contained community, offering a range of residential, commercial, and leisure facilities. The city is built on reclaimed land and is divided into several zones, each with its own unique character and offerings. The residential areas of the city feature a mix of apartments, villas, and townhouses, catering to a range of budgets and preferences. The city also contains schools, healthcare facilities, and community centers. There are also a range of retail and dining options, including a large shopping mall, several supermarkets, and a variety of cafes and restaurants. The city also has a number of parks and green spaces, as well as a beachfront area with a marina and a range of water-based activities.

== Transportation ==
The islands have a causeway connecting them to Muharraq Island, the main island can be reached by public transport via buses. The main island can also be accessed by boat via the marina hosted within the main island.

== Social housing ==
The Diyar Al Muharraq plan includes the construction of social housing projects on 1.2 million m² for 133 units northwest of the artificial island in an area called Deerat Al Oyoun. $366 million of the project was financed by 4 banks (Al Salam Bank-Bahrain, Kuwait Finance House, Bank of Bahrain and Kuwait, and Al Baraka Islamic Bank of Bahrain).

== Image gallery ==
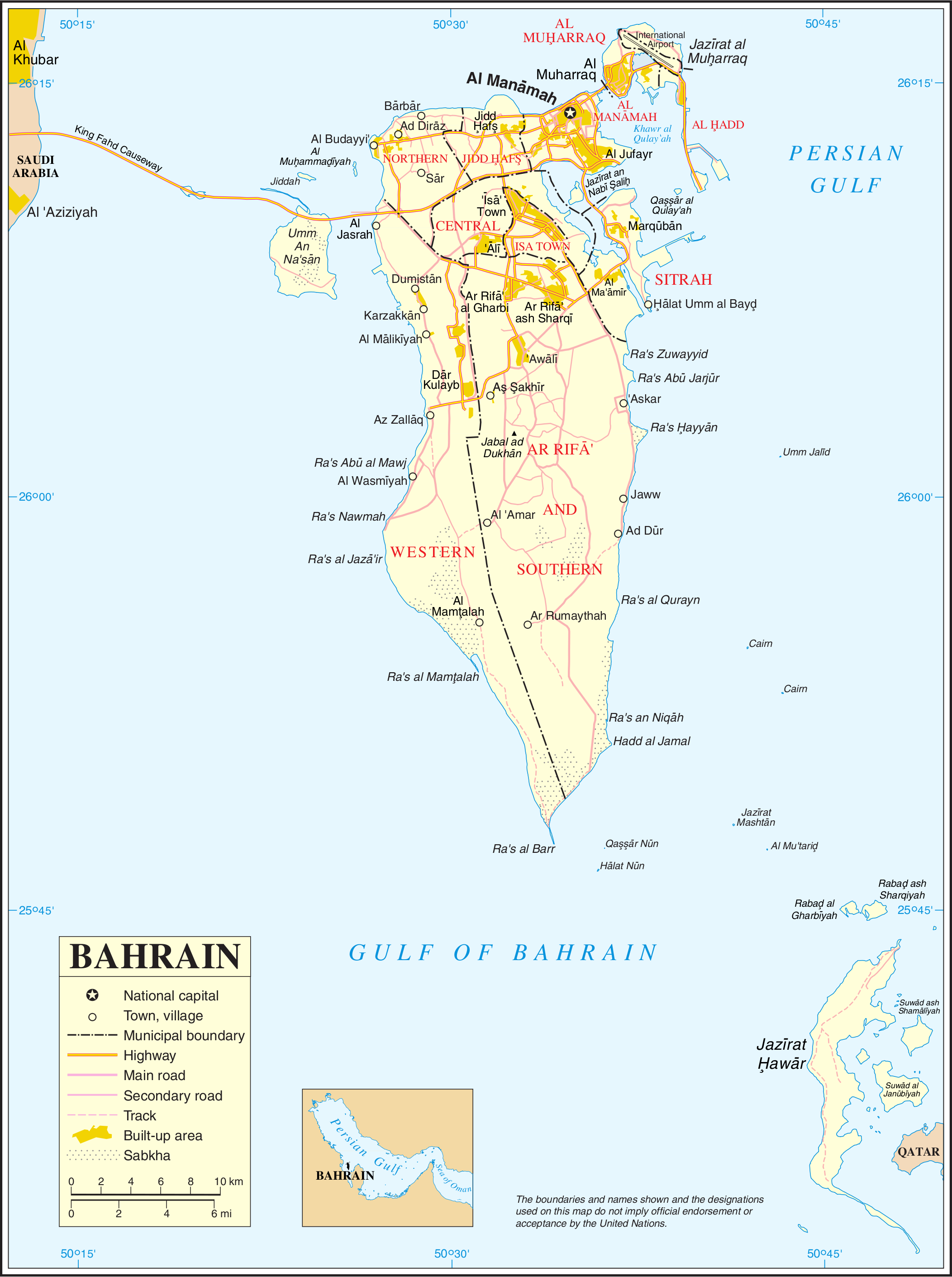
Map of Bahrain

District Map

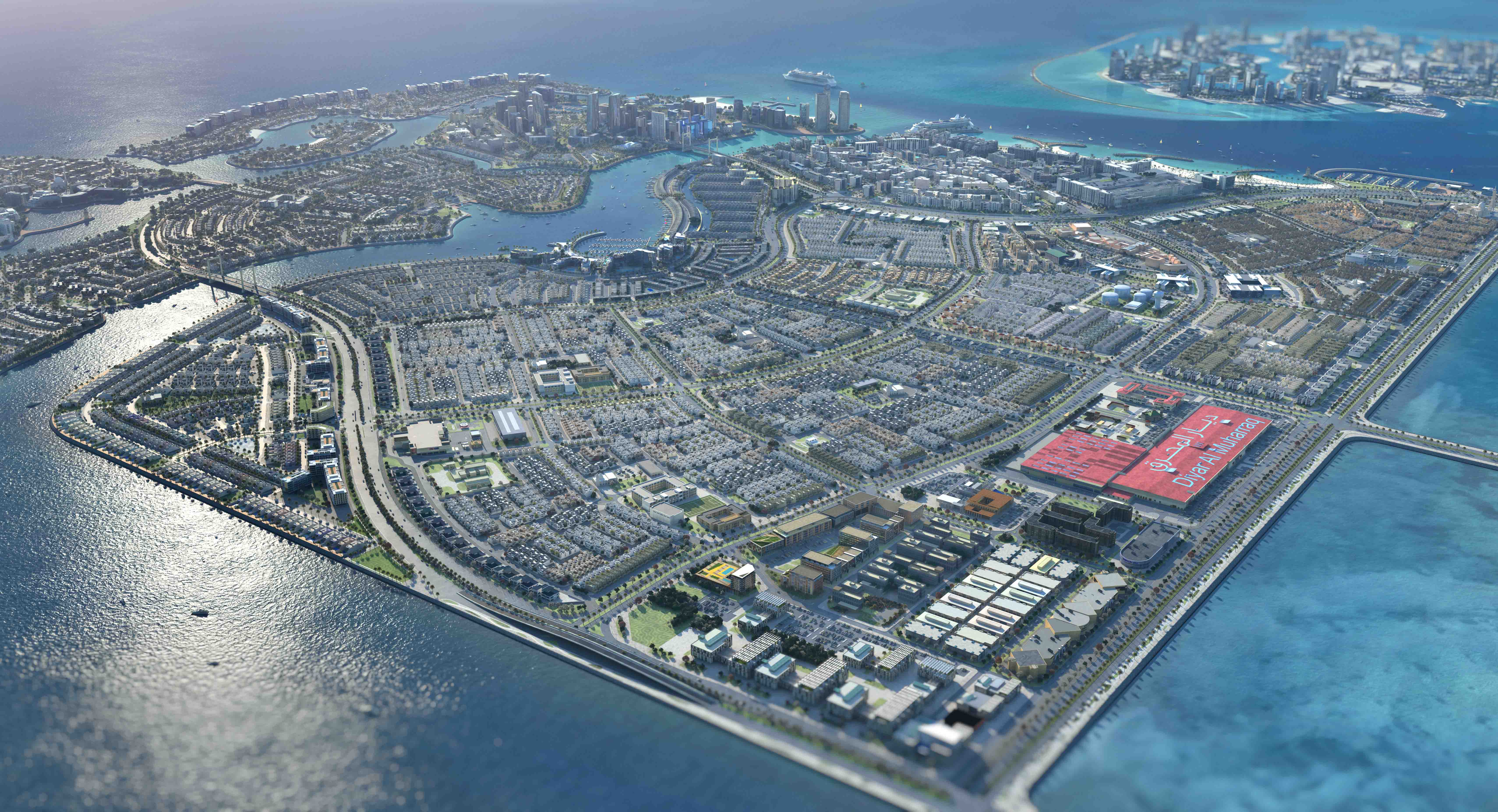
A conceptual image of the completed Masterplan.

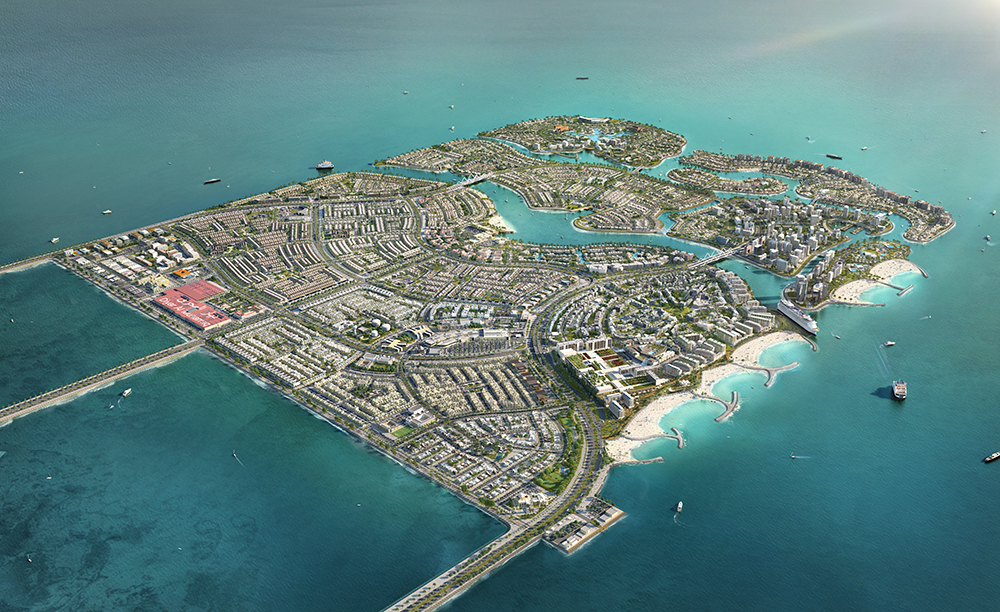
Concept art

== See also ==
- List of islands of Bahrain
