= Airport Terminal 1 (Dubai Metro) =

Rapid transit station in Dubai, UAE

Airport Terminal 1 المطار- مبنى رقم 1

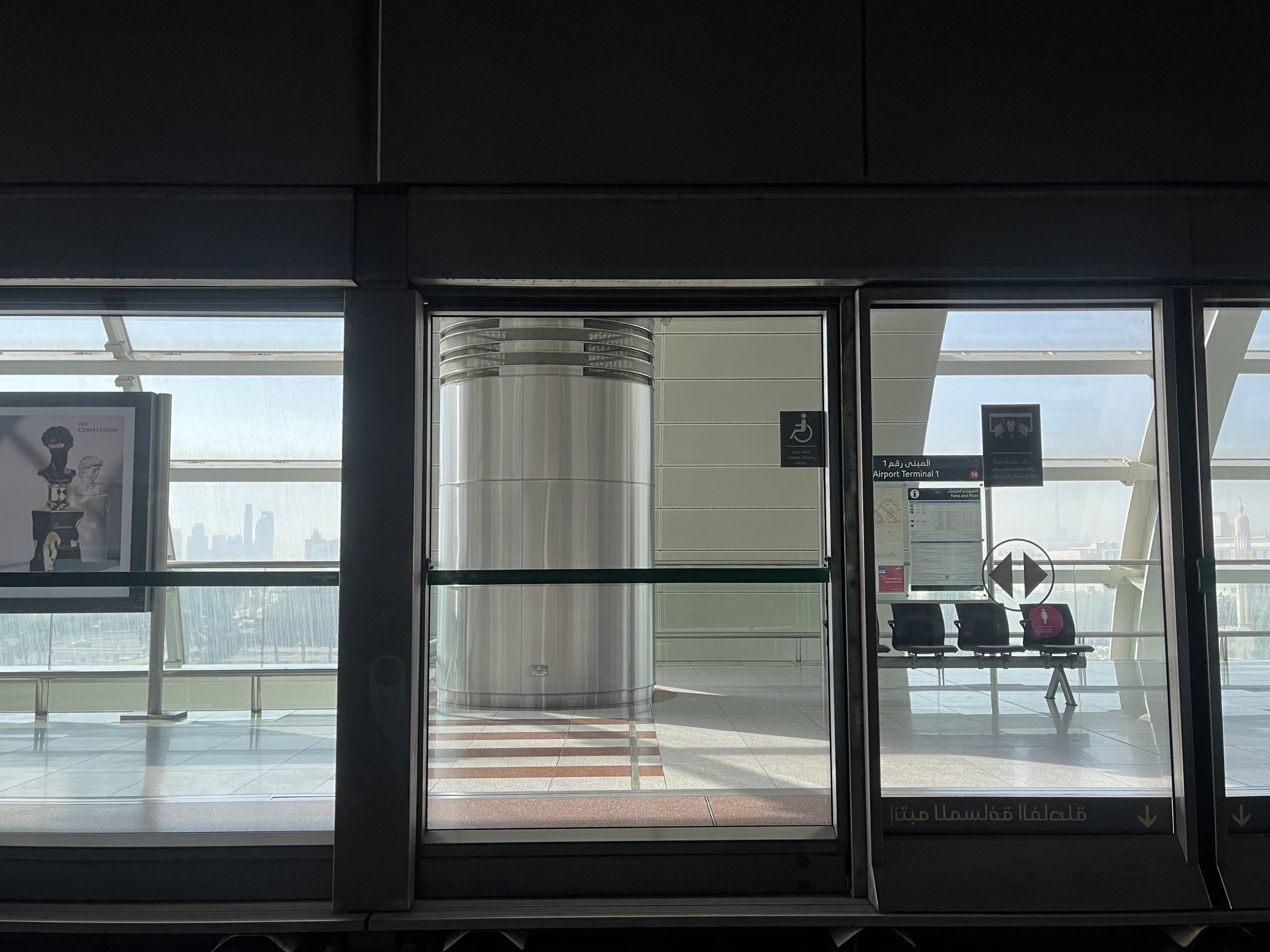

General information
- Location: Dubai Airport Road; Terminal 1 Dubai International Airport, Dubai; United Arab Emirates
- Coordinates: 25.2484°N 55.3523°E
- System: Metro Station
- Operator: Dubai Metro
- Line: Red Line
- Platforms: 2
- Tracks: 2
- Connections: RTA Dubai: 24 International City Stn. - Al Nahda 2; 32C Satwa Stn. - Al Qusais Stn.; 33 Al Ghubaiba Stn. - Al Qusais Stn.; 77 Airport Terminal 3 / Al Garhoud, RTA HQ - Baniyas Square MS; N30 International City Stn. - Airport Terminal 2; C01 Airport Terminal 3 - Satwa Stn.; X64 Al Baraha Stn. - Ras Al Khor; E700 Union Bus Stn. - Fujairah

Other information
- Station code: 14
- Fare zone: 5

History
- Opened: April 30, 2010

Services
Preceding station	Dubai Metro	Following station
Al Garhoud towards Expo 2020 or Life Pharmacy	Red Line	Airport Terminal 3 towards Centrepoint
Location

Airport Terminal 1 (Arabic: المطار- مبنى رقم 1) is a rapid transit station on the Red Line of the Dubai Metro in Dubai, UAE, serving the Terminal 1 of Dubai International Airport.

The station opened as part of the Red Line on 30 April 2010. It is close to Dubai International Airport – Parking B. The station is also close to a number of bus routes.

== Station Layout ==
G	Street level	Exit/Entrance
L1	Concourse	Automatic Fare Collection gates, station agent, crossover
L2	Side platform | Doors will open on the right
L2	Platform 1 Eastbound	Towards ← Life Pharmacy / Expo 2020; Next Station: Al Garhoud
L2	Platform 2 Westbound	Towards → Centrepoint; Next Station: Airport Terminal 3
L2	Side platform | Doors will open on the right
