= Blue Line (Dubai Metro) =

Proposed metro line in Dubai, United Arab Emirates

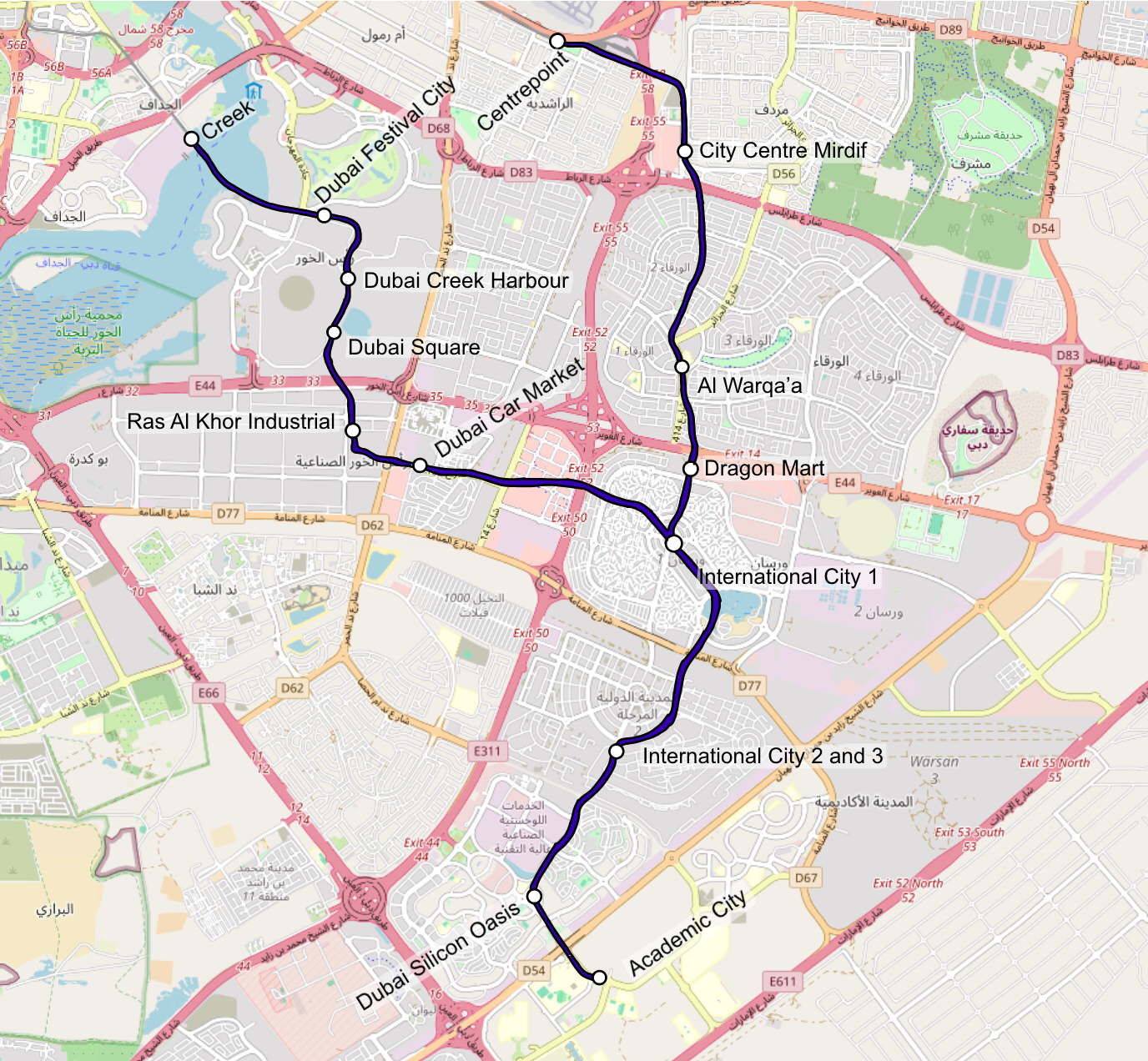

Overview
- Status: Under construction
- Owner: Roads & Transport Authority
- Locale: Dubai, United Arab Emirates
- Termini: Creek, Centrepoint; Academic City
- Stations: 14

Service
- Type: Rapid transit
- System: Dubai Metro
- Operator: Keolis
- Rolling stock: TBA

History
- Planned opening: September 9, 2029; 2 years' time

Technical
- Line length: 30 kilometers (19 mi)
- Character: TBA
- Track gauge: 1,435 mm (4 ft 8 1/2 in) standard gauge
- Electrification: Third rail
- Operating speed: 110 km/h (68 mph)

The Blue Line is an under construction rapid transit line of the Dubai Metro in Dubai, United Arab Emirates. It will be the third metro line in the city, after the Red and Green lines, with a total length of 30 kilometres and 14 stations, connecting the neighbourhoods of Ras Al Khor Industrial Area, Al Warqaa, Mirdif, Dubai Creek Harbour, Dubai Silicon Oasis, Dubai Academic City, and Dubai International City. The line will have interchanges with existing and future metro lines and with the Etihad Rail network.

There is a transfer station with the Green Line at Creek station and one with the Red Line at Centrepoint. Additionally, International City 1 is an interchange station between the Creek and Centrepoint branches. The Blue Line has its main depot at Al Ruwayyah 3.

The project was approved by Sheikh Mohammed bin Rashid Al Maktoum, Vice President and Prime Minister of the UAE and Ruler of Dubai, on 24 November 2023, with a total investment of AED 18 billion. It is expected to be operational by 2029. The project aims to enhance the public transport system in Dubai and support the economic and social development of the city. The project will also serve the expected increase in the number of visitors and residents in Dubai. The project will be implemented by the Roads & Transport Authority (RTA), in collaboration with the private sector.

== Construction ==
Bids to build the line were received from consortia:

- China Tiesiju Civil Engineering, Arab Contractors, Binladin Contracting and CAF
- Limak Holding, Mapa Group and CRRC
- Larsen & Toubro, PowerChina, Wade Adams and Hitachi
- FCC, China State Construction Engineering and Alstom

Creek station: The track layout south of Creek station is modified to create a new extension and two additional platforms to serve the new line.

Centrepoint station: The track layout northeast of Centrepoint station is modified to create a new extension and two additional platforms to serve the new line.

Dubai Creek Harbour station will be the tallest station in the world. It will be designed by SOM, the same firm that designed the Burj Khalifa.

As a result of increasing popularity of the metro, the new stations feature platforms wider than the ones found in the existing metro stations to cope with the greater ridership. The extension is 30 km in length with 14.5 km elevated and 15.5 km underground. Of the 14 stations, nine are elevated and five are underground. Additionally, it has a metro depot beyond Academic City in Al Ruwayyah 3, east of Academic City. The route is expected to have 320,000 passengers daily by 2040.

There are two direct routes to Creek and Centrepoint from Academic City which don't require people to swap trains at International City 1. There will be a Y-junction at International City 1. A Y-junction joins all 3 rails together. Trains traveling from Academic City directly to Centrepoint and Creek will be able to travel direct without hassle of switching trains.

Travel time between Creek and Academic City stations is expected to be 25 minutes. Travel time between Centrepoint and Academic City stations is expected to be 17 minutes.

As of September 2026, construction was reported to be approximately 25% complete, with the Roads and Transport Authority targeting 30% completion by the end of 2026 and full operational service by 9 September 2029.

== Statistics ==
The line was initially supposed to run between Dubai International Airport and Al Maktoum International Airport along E311 road, to be completed by 2012, but due to the 2008 financial crisis, it was delayed. After the 2023 redesign, the line will be 30 kilometres long, with 15.5 kilometres underground with 5 stations, while the rest will be above-ground with 9 stations.

== Route ==
Proposed route for the Blue line metro.

Seven stations will be elevated, including one iconic station. Five stations will be underground, including one interchange station; and two elevated transfer stations connected to the existing Centrepoint station, the eastern terminus of Red Line in Rashidiya; and Creek station, the southern terminus of Green Line in Al Jaddaf.

== New stations ==
14 new stations are planned on the Blue Line:

- Dubai Creek Harbour (Emaar Properties Station): A 74-metre-tall station designed by SOM, located in the Dubai Creek Harbour area. It is planned to be the highest metro station in the world.
- Dubai Festival City Station: Serving the retail and waterfront development.
- Ras Al Khor Station: Providing access to the Ras Al Khor Industrial Area and the nearby wildlife sanctuary.
- International City 1 (Interchange Station): An underground hub that will act as a Y-junction, connecting the two branches of the Blue Line.
- International City 2 Station: Expanding access into the residential community.
- International City 3 Station: Serving the residential and commercial hubs within Dubai International City.
- Dubai Silicon Oasis Station: A stop in Dubai's technology and innovation hub, located opposite Fakeeh University Hospital.
- Academic City Station: The terminus serving Dubai's educational hub, which hosts thousands of university students.
- Mirdif Station: Situated near the City Centre Mirdif mall, providing metro access to this suburban community.
- Al Warqa Station: Serving the residential district of Al Warqa and the nearby Dubai Safari Park.
- Creek Interchange Station (Al Jaddaf): Connecting the new Blue Line directly with the existing Green Line.
- Centrepoint Interchange Station (Rashidiya): Connecting the Blue Line with the Red Line's northern terminus.

The route includes two other planned stations, likely to be for smaller or future-focused locations.
