= Al Awir =

Town in Dubai, United Arab Emirates

Al Awir العوير
- Location within United Arab Emirates
- Coordinates: 25°10′30″N 55°32′30″E
- Country: United Arab Emirates
- Emirate: Dubai

Area
  - Total: 94.7 km^{2} (36.6 sq mi)

Population (2022)
  - Total: 8,457
  - Density: 90/km^{2} (230/sq mi)
- Time zone: UTC+4

Al Awir, also spelled Al Aweer (Arabic: العوير) is a town in the Emirate of Dubai, United Arab Emirates, located about 35 kilometers from the city center. It has long been a centre of agriculture and camel breeding. Among many other Dubai families who have farms at Al Awir, Dubai's ruling Maktoum family maintains a farm in the area.

It is home to the Al Awir Fruit & Vegetable Market, as well as Al Awir Central Jail.

In 2018 the immigration centre at Al Awir was the location of a major 'amnesty centre', where people who had overstayed their UAE work visas could apply to leave the country with no fines or penalties.

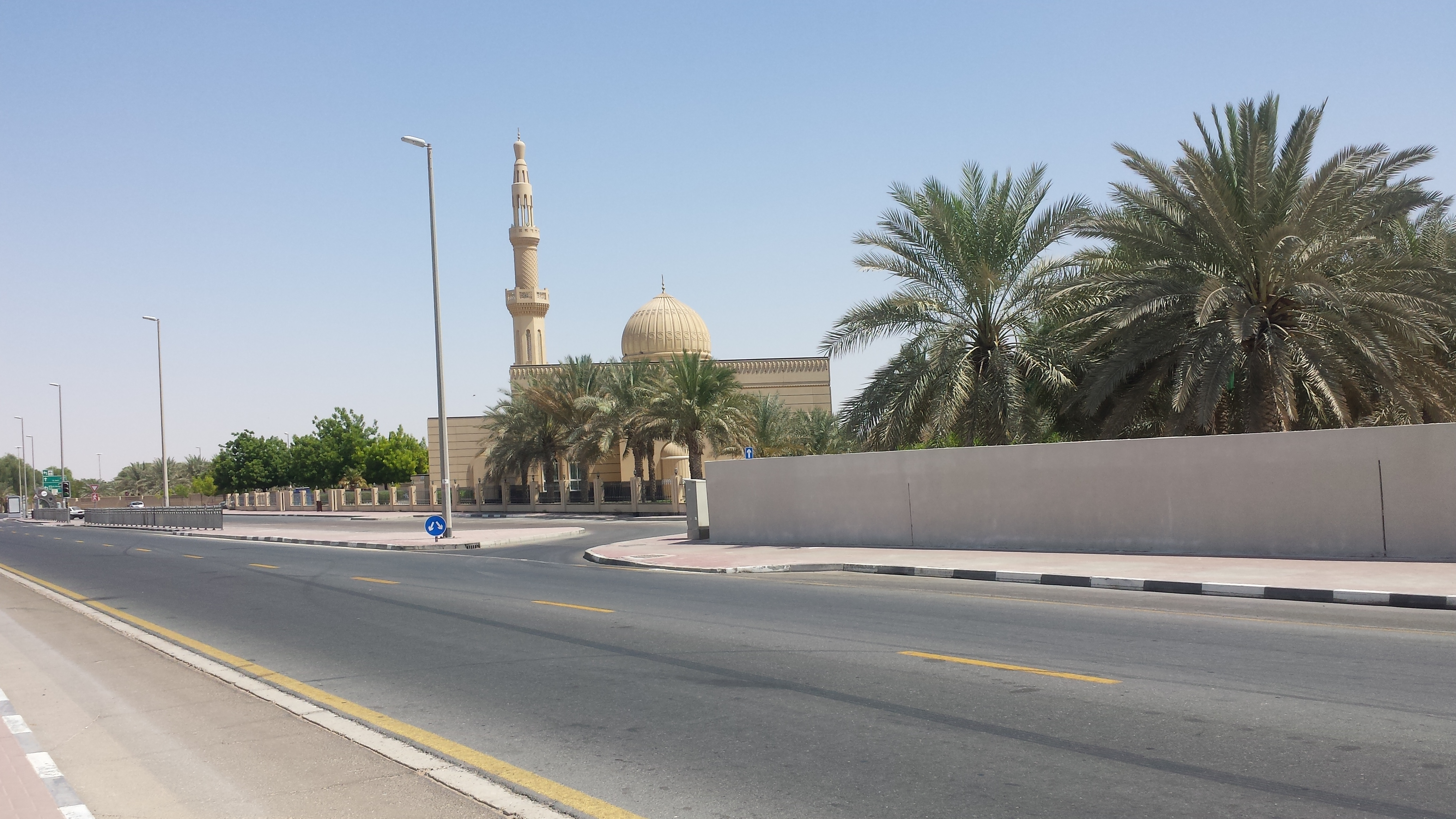
Al Awir, 2015

Al Awir is adjacent to the Emirates Road (E611) and is bordered by Ras al Khor in Dubai and Lahbab to the East.

The area is also home to the Al Awir Sewage Treatment Plant. Established in 1988, it was historically the primary wastewater treatment facility serving Dubai City. To keep pace with Dubai's rapid population growth, the plant has undergone several mega-infrastructure expansions, scaling its capacity significantly from its initial 130,000 cubic meters per day.
