= Terminal 1 (Vancouver, Washington) =

- Location: Vancouver, Washington, U.S.; 45°37′19″N 122°40′30″W
- Architect: Graham Baba Architects
- Total retail floor area: 40,000 sq ft (3,700 m^{2})
- Interactive map of Terminal 1

Terminal 1 is a planned development in Vancouver, Washington, United States. The port started installing steel pilings in October 2025.

ZoomInfo is slated to occupy 166,000 square feet of space in a building at Terminal 1.
