= Ras Al Khor =

Wetland reserve in Dubai, the United Arab Emirates

- Raʾs Al-Khūr (Arabic: رَأْس ٱلْخُوْر)
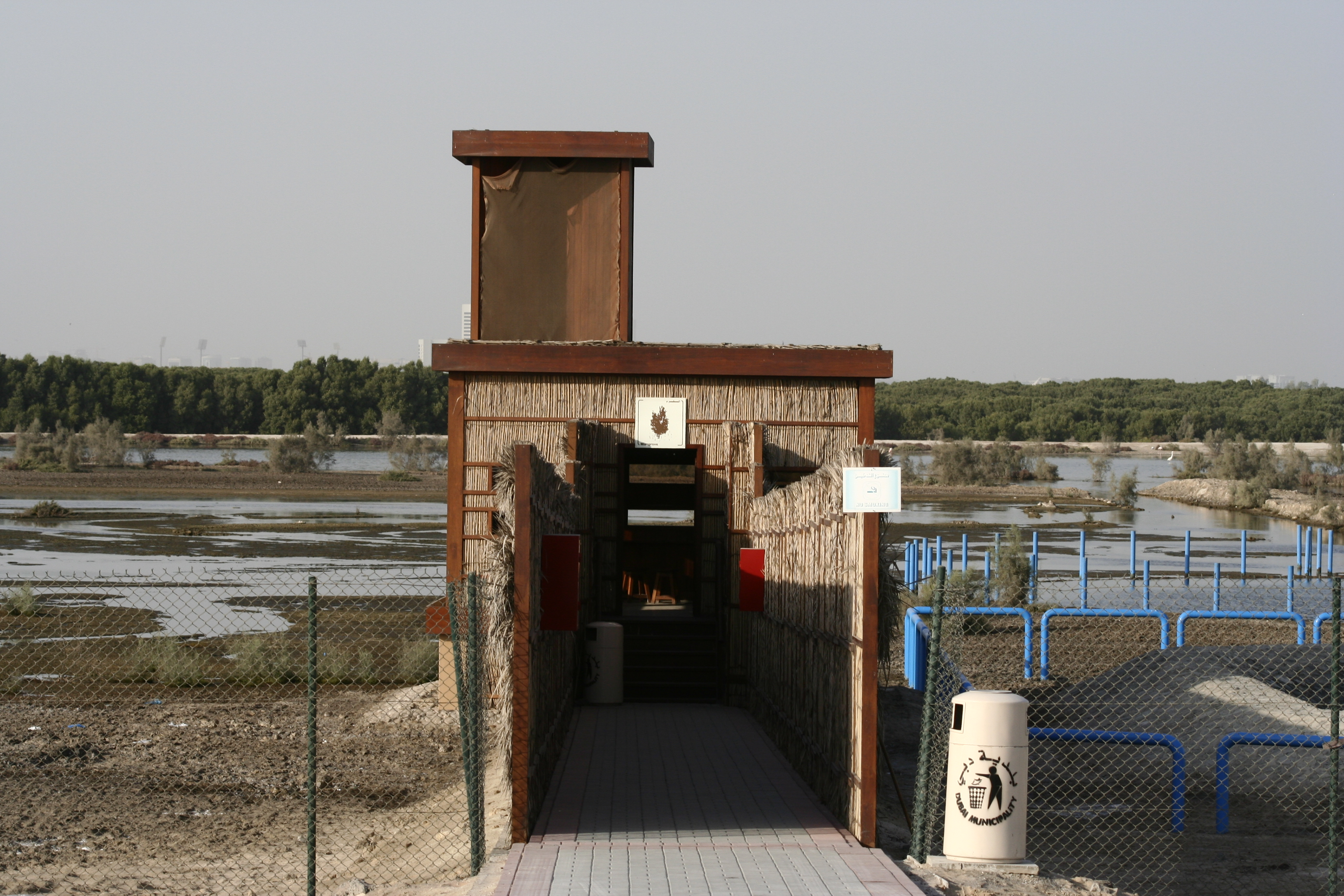
- One of the three hides at the Ras Al Khor Bird Sanctuary

- Location within Dubai Location within United Arab Emirates Location within Persian Gulf Location within Middle East Location within West and Central Asia
- Location: Dubai Creek, Dubai
- Nearest city: Ras Al Khor Industrial Area, Nad Al Hammar, Umm Ramool, Al Garhoud
- Coordinates: 25°11′34.8″N 55°19′22.8″E
- Area: 1,300 ha (5.0 sq mi)

Ramsar Wetland
- Official name: Ras Al Khor Wildlife Sanctuary
- Designated: 29 August 2007
- Reference no.: 1715

Ras Al Khor (Arabic: رَأْس ٱلْخُوْر, romanized: Raʾs al-Khūr, lit. 'Head of the Creek') or Ras Al Khor Wildlife Sanctuary is a wetland reserve in Dubai, renowned for attracting large numbers of migratory birds. It is also home to a large population of crustaceans, small mammals, and fish. It was the end of Dubai Creek before the construction of Dubai Canal, hence the Arabic name.

== Overview ==
Ras Al Khor Wildlife Sanctuary represents an enclave of relative wilderness amidst traffic and sprawling urban infrastructure. It is among the few urban protected areas of the world.It covers an area of approximately 10.13 km² and declared as a Protected Area on March 1, 1998.The conservation area has attracted more than 90,000 visitors from over 100 countries.

The Dubai Municipality has taken great efforts to protect and preserve the biodiversity of this delicate ecosystem. The wetland has been fenced off from the public and three birding hides have been built. The bird hides are a first step towards the development of more elaborate visitor education facilities in the protected area. The WWF UAE Project Office collaborated with Dubai Municipality's Environment Department, in setting up the facilities that were sponsored by the National Bank of Dubai.

Opportunities for experiencing a natural environment in this rapidly expanding emirate are so limited that the opening of Ras Al Khor to visitors is a boon to present and potential nature lovers.

There are three birding hides located on the perimeter of the sanctuary open to the public. Entrance is free and the sanctuary operates from 7:30am-5:30pm in the Winter and 6:00 am to 6:00 pm in the Summer.

Ras Al Khor is also home to about 470 species of fauna and 47 kinds of flora. Greater flamingoes (Phoenicopterus roseus), are one of the main attractions in the preserve.

== Species ==
Some of the regular visitors to the sanctuary are:

- Asian pied myna
- Black-winged stilt
- Blue-cheeked bee-eater
- Bar-headed Goose
- Caspian tern
- Citrine wagtail
- Common greenshank
- Common hoopoe
- Common kingfisher
- Common sandpiper
- Common snipe
- Cormorant
- Curlew
- Dunlin
- Eurasian marsh harrier
- Great black backed gull
- Great egret
- Greater flamingo
- Grey francolin
- Grey heron
- Grey plover
- Indian peafowl
- Indian roller
- Indian silverbill
- Isabelline shrike
- Little bittern
- Little green bee-eater
- Malabar lark
- Mallard
- Osprey
- Pied avocet
- Purple sunbird
- Red-vented bulbul
- Red-wattled lapwing
- Ringed plover
- Ruddy turnstone
- Sanderling
- Snowy plover
- Spotted eagle
- Terek sandpiper
- Western heron
- White wagtail
- White-eared bulbul
- Yellow billed stork
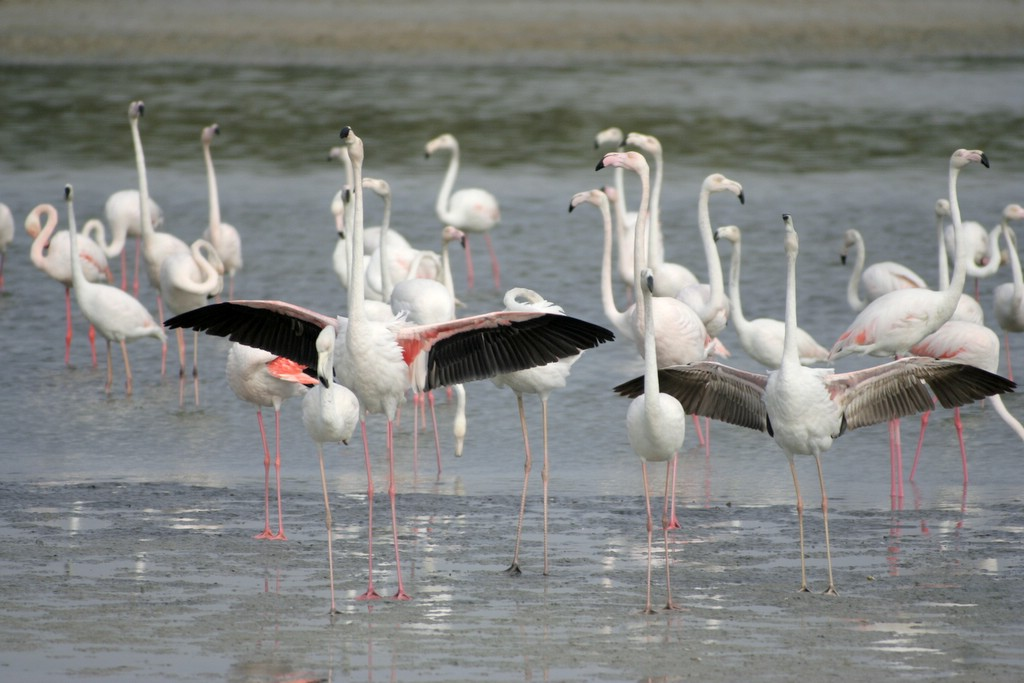
Greater flamingoes

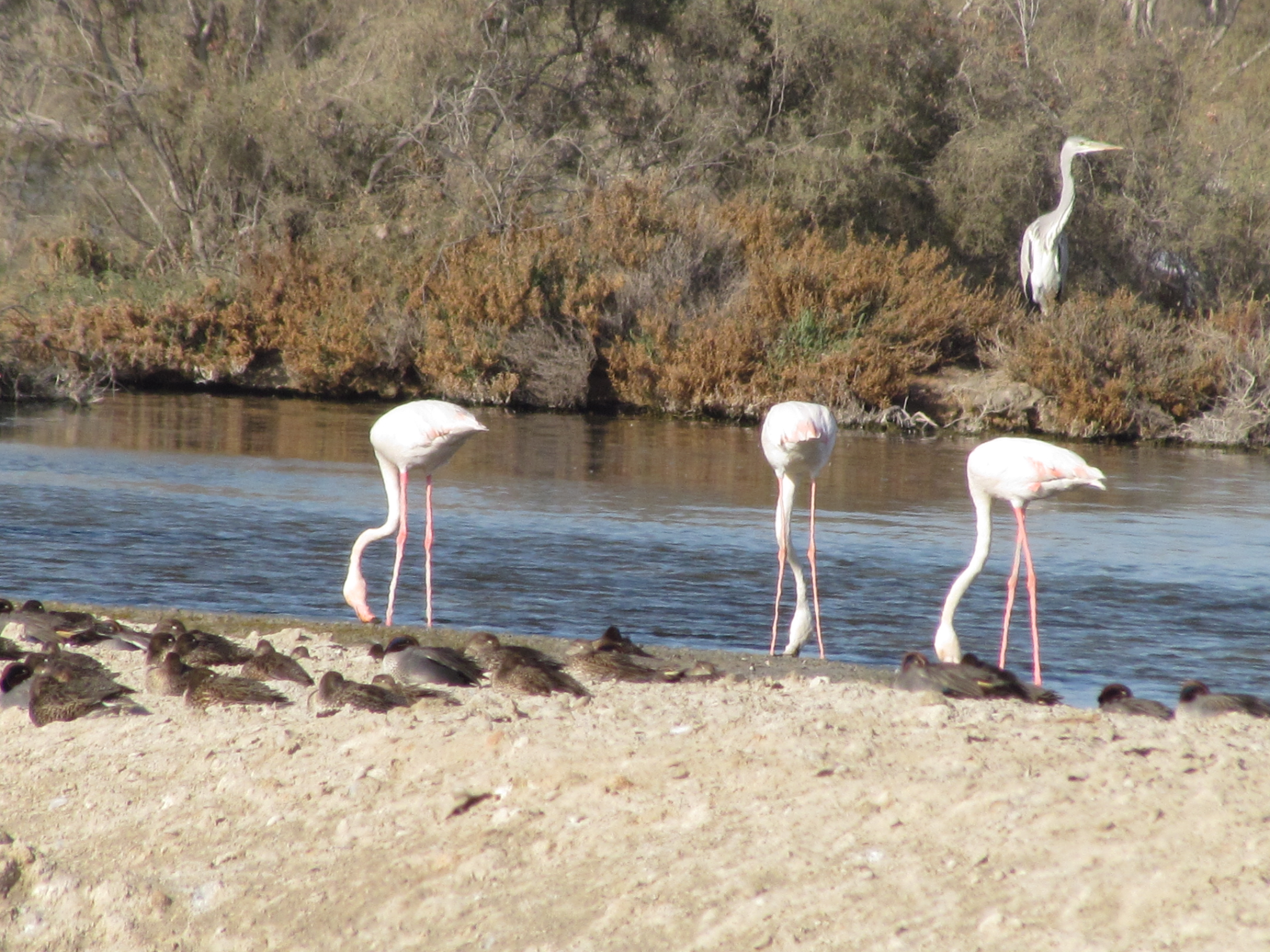

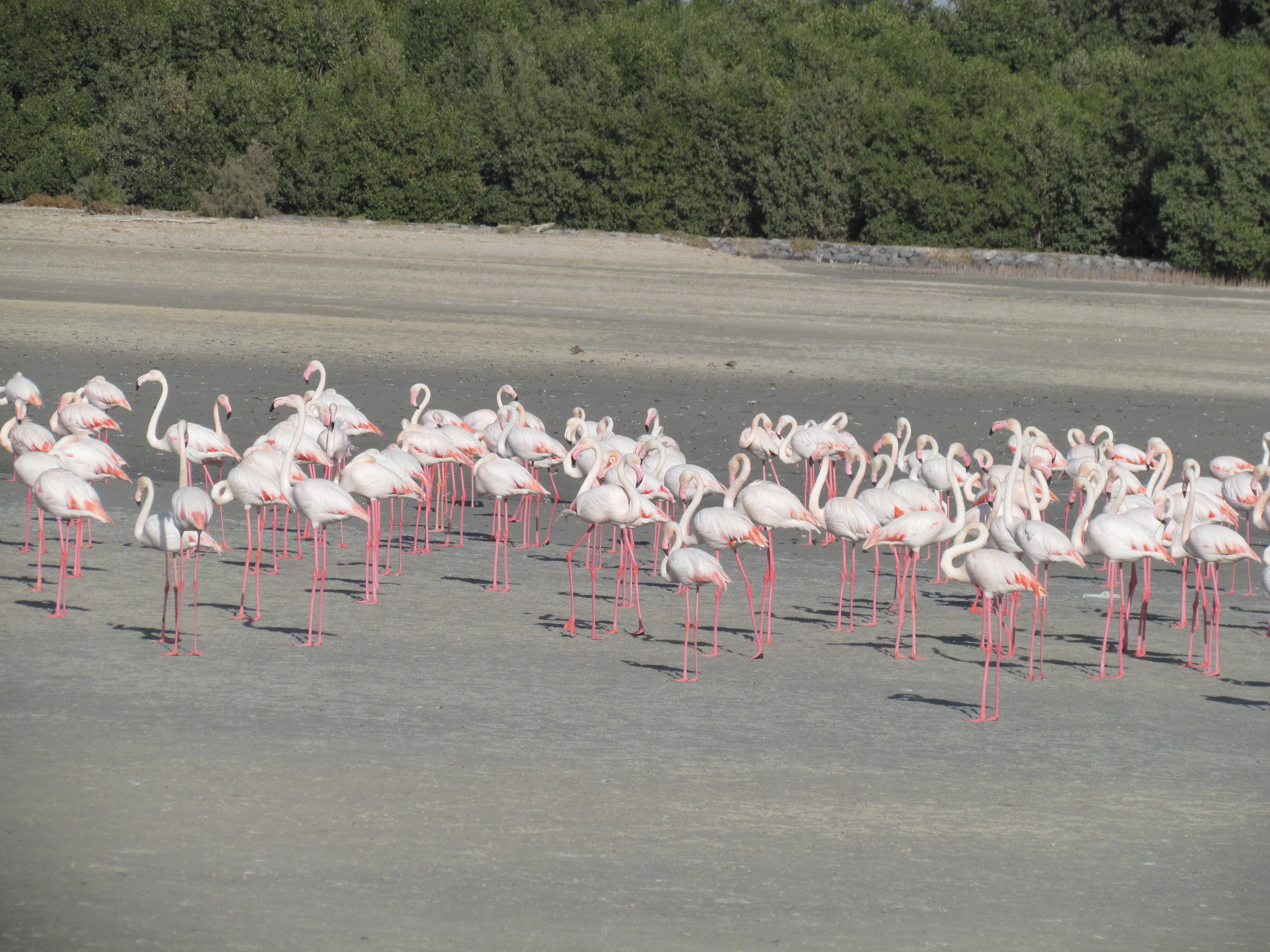

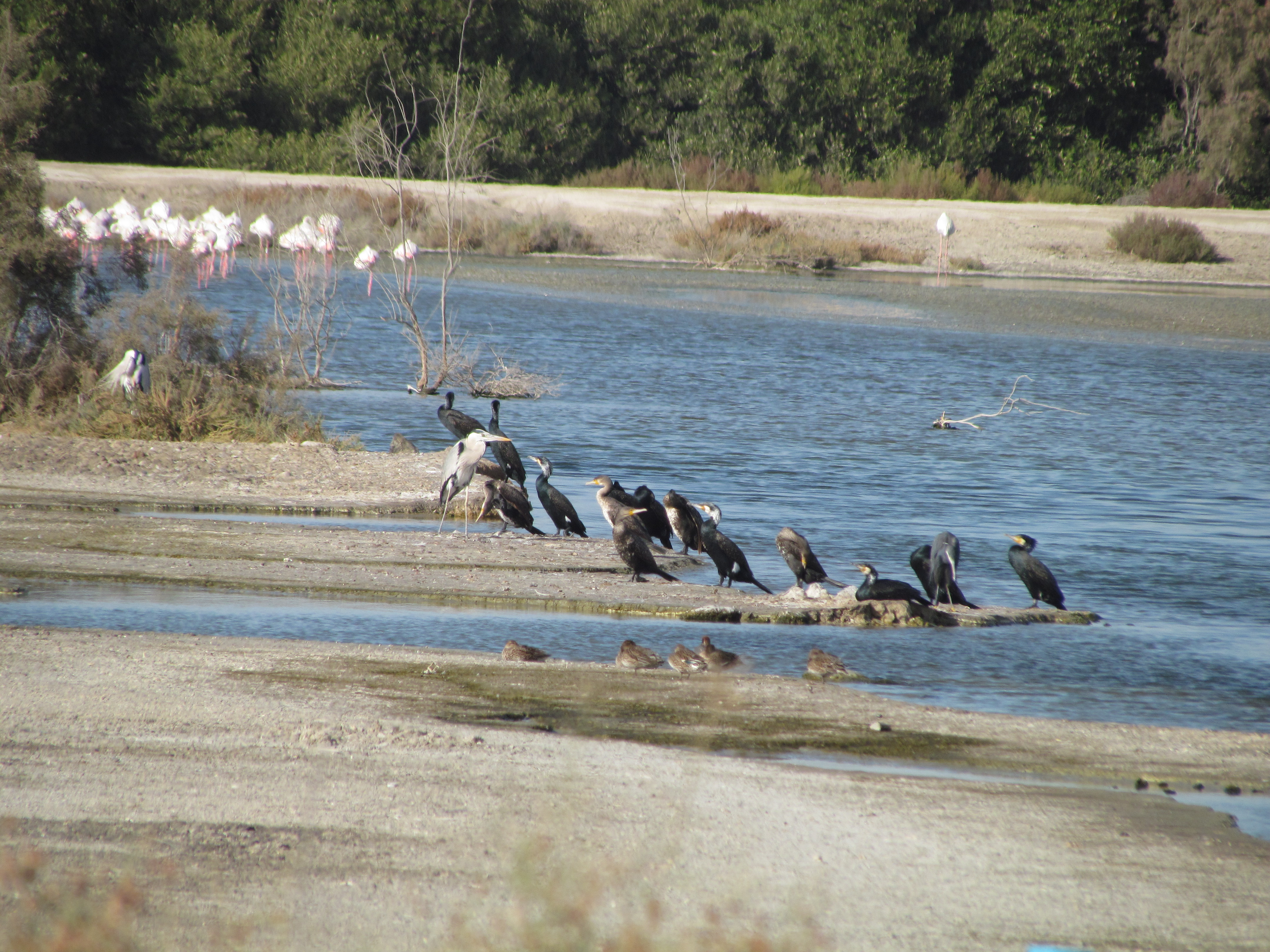

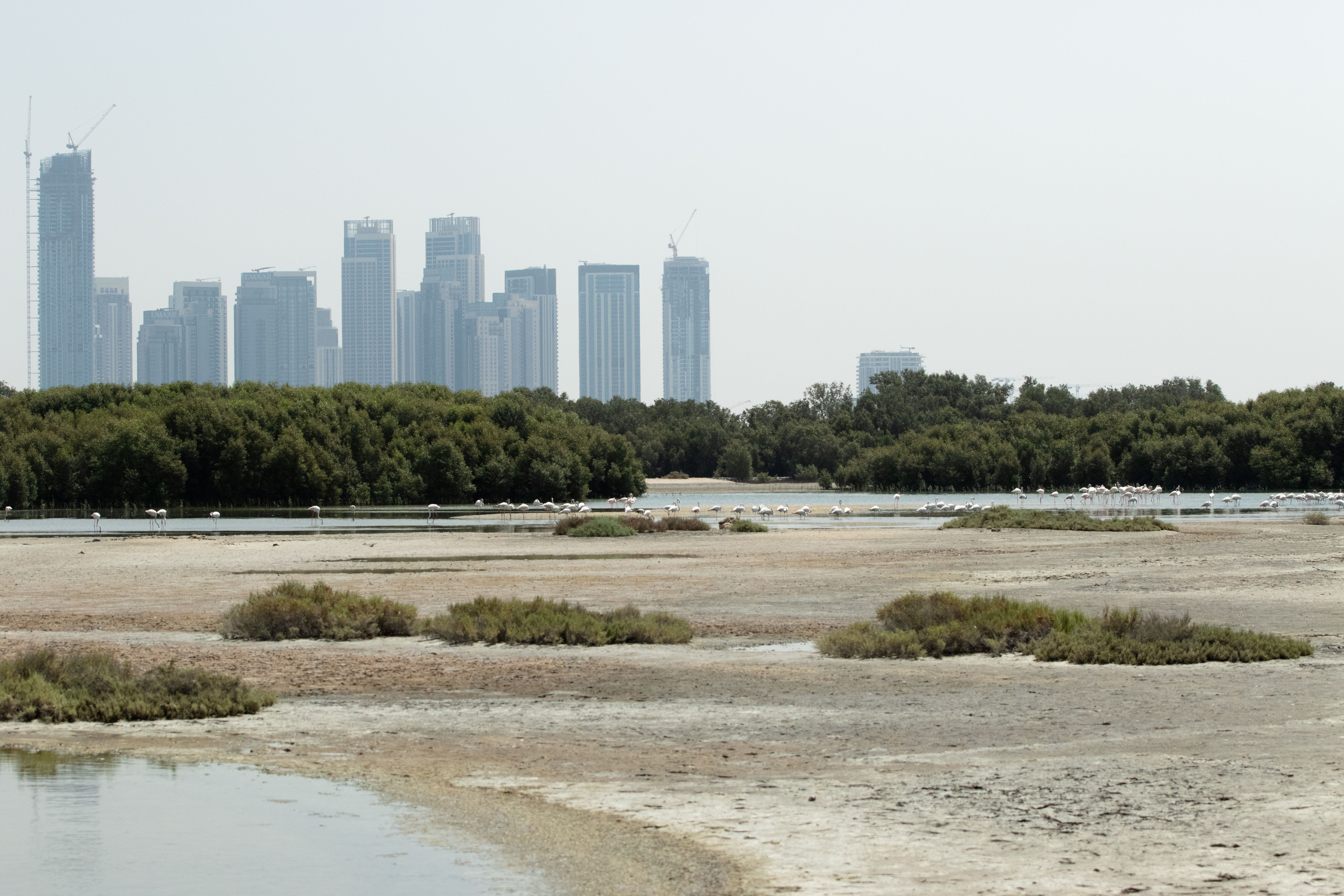

== See also ==
- Al Marmoom Desert Conservation Reserve, Dubai
- Al-Wathba Wetland Reserve, Abu Dhabi
- Dubai Desert Conservation Reserve
- Jebel Hafeet National Park, Abu Dhabi
- Mangrove National Park, Abu Dhabi
- Sir Abu Nu'ayr, Sharjah
- Sir Bani Yas, Abu Dhabi
- Wadi Wurayah, Fujairah
- Wildlife of the United Arab Emirates
