= Dubai International Academic City =

University town in Dubai, United Arab Emirates

Dubai International Academic City مدينة دبي الأكاديمية العالمية
- University Campus
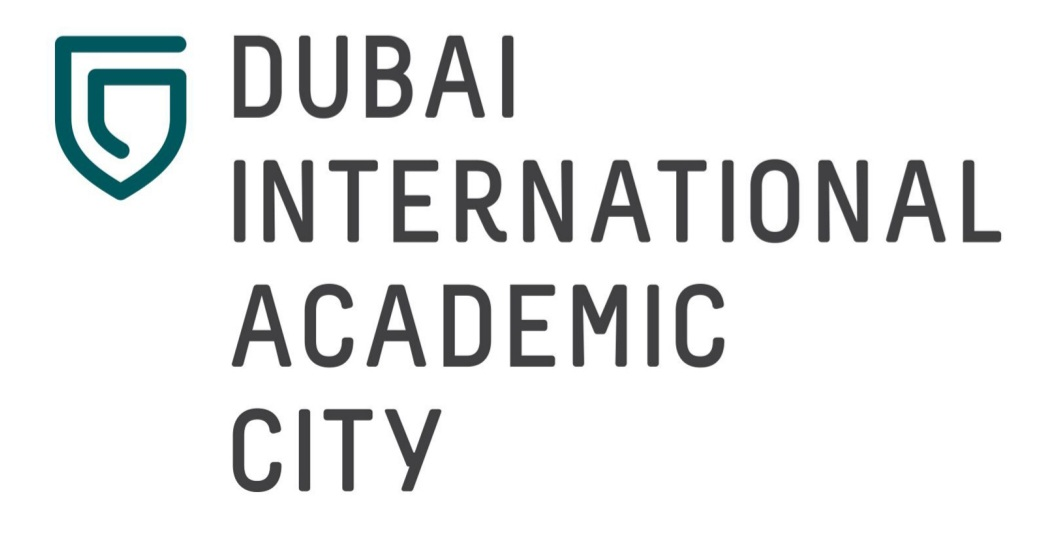
- Seal
- Nickname: DIAC
- Interactive map of Dubai International Academic City
- Coordinates: 25°06′47″N 55°24′30″E
- Country: United Arab Emirates
- Emirate: (Emirate of Dubai) Dubai
- Established: 2007; 19 years ago

Area
  - Total: 11.98 km^{2} (4.63 sq mi)
- Endowment: 200 million AED
- Students: 27,500
- Director: Dr. Ayoub Kazim; Mohammad Abdullah
- Campus: Urban (2,960 acres)
- Colours
- Affiliations: Government of Dubai, KHDA
- Website: Academic City

Dubai International Academic City (DIAC), informally known as Academic City, is a university town in the city of Dubai, United Arab Emirates along the Dubai-Al Ain Road. The project was launched in May 2006 in liaison with Dubai Knowledge Park. The regulatory authority in the DIAC is the Dubai Development Authority.

As a university town, DIAC is a foundation for schools, colleges and universities. Consisting of 27 colleges and universities, 3 innovation centers, the DIAC enrolls about 27,500 students. It offers more than 500 academic programs in different fields.

== History ==
DIAC was established in 2007 as a university town and a residential free-zone dedicated to higher education by TECOM Group. It was approved by Government of Dubai and was launched as a common campus where schools, colleges and universities from Knowledge Park would move to. Dr. Ayoub Kazim, former associate professor of United Arab Emirates University served as Managing Director of DIAC. In 2016, Mohammad Abdullah, president of Dubai Institute of Design and Innovation became the managing director.

With a campus area of more than 129 million square feet, DIAC acts as a foundation for several residential colleges and universities. After its inception, a campus expansion program was taken up, which finished in 2012. In 2006, Institute of Management Technology, Dubai was one of the first universities to set up permanent campus in DIAC.

The year of 2017 witnessed 10 year anniversary of Dubai International Academic City. In the same year, Curtin University, United Arab Emirates University branch campuses were announced to establish in DIAC.

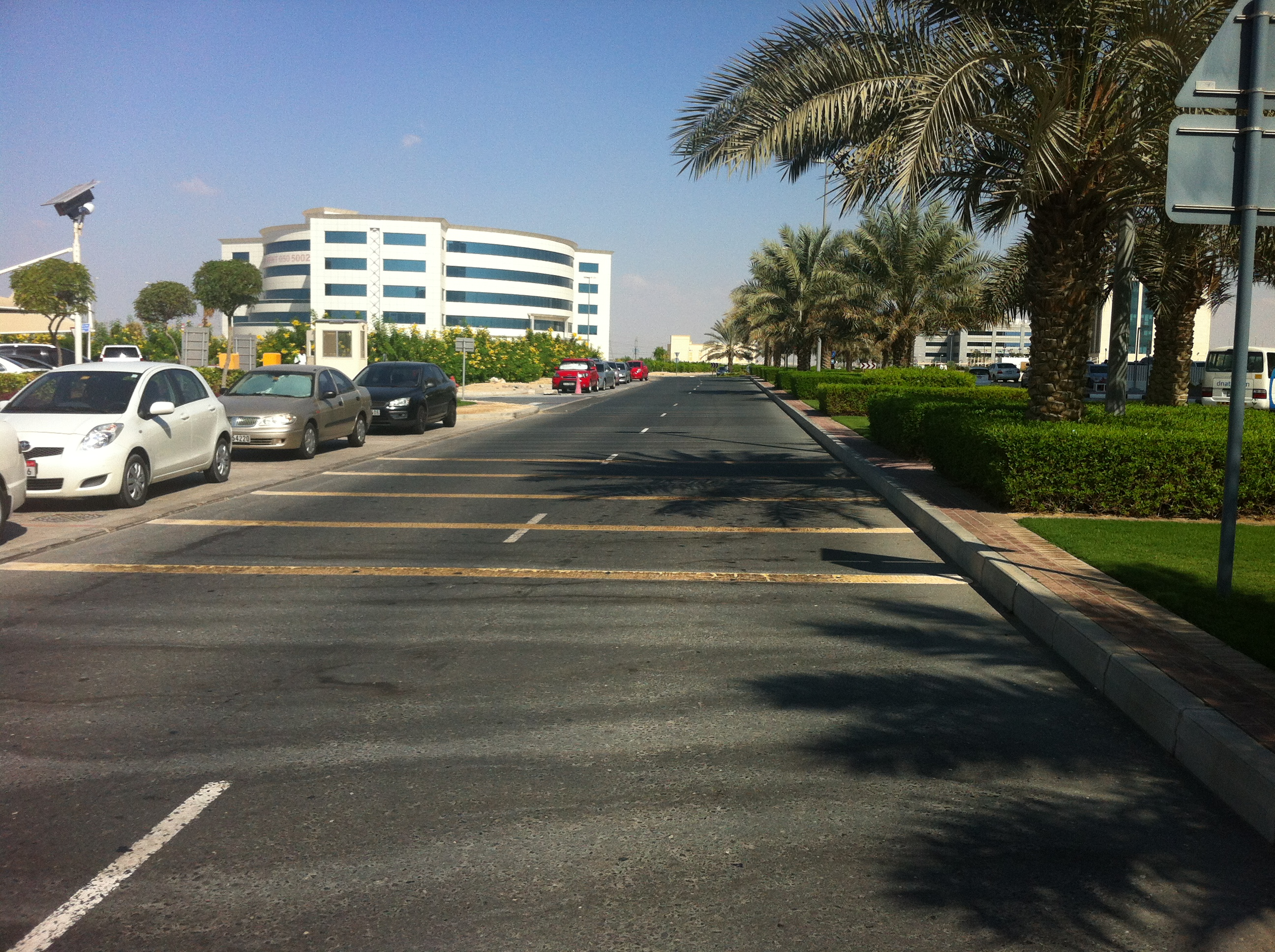
Academic City - Dubai - United Arab Emirates. 2012

== Present form ==
DIAC has grown into an educational hub. Consisting of 27 residential colleges and universities and 3 innovation centers, DIAC enrolls more than 27,500 students of over 150 nationalities.

Universities and colleges offer more than 500 bachelor, master and doctoral programs in various fields of business, engineering, general sciences, humanities, management, medical sciences and technology. It was titled as MENA's largest educational hub. Many other institutions are expected to move to DIAC in future. Currently, DIAC comprises reputed and renowned universities from other countries like American University, Murdoch University, BITS Pilani, and British University.

Due to increased student intake, DIAC has taken up student housing projects for providing budget friendly stay for students affiliated to DIAC, As of now 2 of these student housing projects have been completed and are operational. However, some universities provide their own residential facilities and students are allowed to opt either.

DIAC has taken steps to promote innovation and provides incubation facilities to interested students at innovation centers.

== Institutions ==
=== Colleges ===
- Dubai English Speaking College
- Dubai Men's College
- Hamdan eTQM University
- Higher Colleges of Technology
- Imam Malik College
- UK College of Business and Computing - Dubai Campus

=== Research centers ===
- Dubai Statistics Center
- International Center for Biosaline Agriculture (ICBA)

=== Schools ===
- German School Dubai
- Lycée Français International Georges Pompidou
- Sheikh Rashid bin Saeed Islamic Institute

=== Universities ===
- Abu Dhabi University
- Al Ghurair University
- American University in the Emirates
- Amity University
- Birla Institute of Technology and Science, Pilani – Dubai Campus
- University of Birmingham
- British University in Dubai
- Curtin University Dubai
- De Montfort University, Dubai
- École Hôtelière Helvétique
- Emirates Aviation University
- Emirates Institute for Banking and Financial Studies
- French Fashion Institute ESMOD Dubai
- Hamdan Bin Mohammed Smart University
- Heriot-Watt University Dubai
- Indian Institute of Management Ahmedabad, Dubai Campus
- Institute of Management Technology, Dubai
- Islamic Azad University
- Manipal University Dubai
- Murdoch University Dubai
- Middlesex University Dubai
- National Institute for Vocational Education Dubai
- St. Joseph University Dubai
- S P Jain School of Global Management Dubai
- Shaheed Zulfikar Ali Bhutto Institute of Science and Technology
- Strathclyde Business School
- University of Dubai
- University of Exeter
- University of Wollongong in Dubai
- Zayed University
- Jaipur National University, RAK Campus

=== Education campuses ===
Dubai Knowledge Park provides facilities for corporate training and learning institutions to operate with 100% foreign ownership. There are over 400 companies and institutions operating within it, which include occupational assessment and testing providers, universities, computer training providers, professional centers, executive development providers and HR consultancy companies. It is owned by Dubai Holding's subsidiary TECOM Investments. It is located in Al Sufouh 2 District.

In 2007, TECOM Investments launched a separate facility, Dubai International Academic City, where all institutions of higher education from Dubai Knowledge Park will be moved to.

Dubai Knowledge Park has previously been known as Knowledge Village.

== Institutions expected to move to DIAC ==
- Dubai Aviation College (currently near Garhood Bridge)
- Dubai Police Officers' Academy (currently between Burj Al Arab and Sheikh Zayed Road)
- St Petersburg State University of Engineering and Economics
- UAE Academy of Hospitality

== Dubai Metro ==
On November 24, 2023, Mohammed bin Rashid Al Maktoum approved the Blue Line project of the Dubai Metro and the area will be served by Academic City station.

Preceding station	Dubai Metro	Following station
Dubai Silicon Oasis towards Creek or Centrepoint	Blue Line Opening 2029	Terminus
