= Centrepoint (Dubai Metro) =

Metro station in Dubai, UAE

Centrepoint سنتربوينت

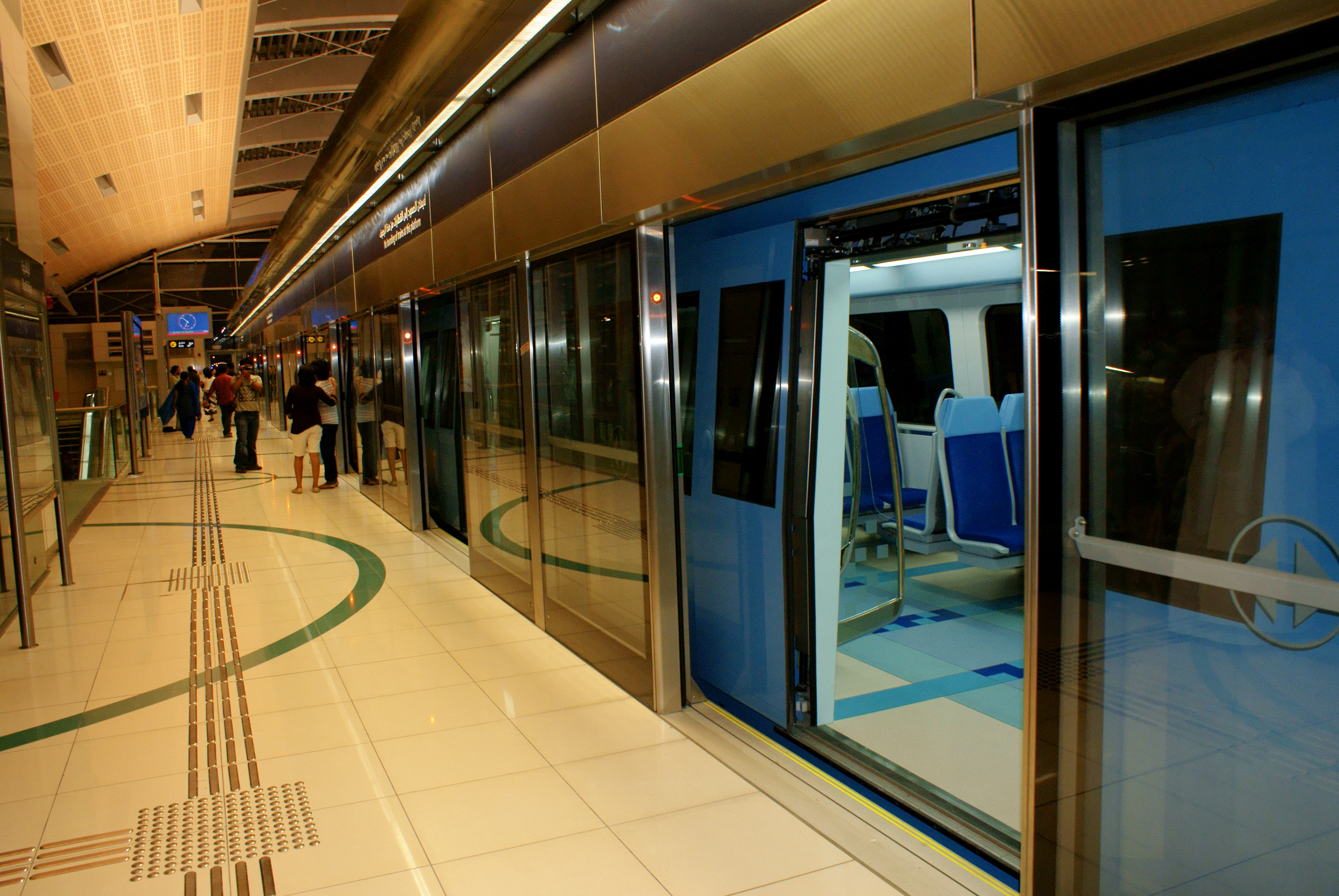
- A view of the platform

General information
- Location: Al Rashidiya, Dubai; Emirates
- Coordinates: 25°13′48″N 55°23′29″E
- System: Metro Station
- Operator: Dubai Metro
- Line: Red Line Blue Line
- Platforms: 1 island platform, 1 side platform
- Tracks: 3
- Connections: RTA Dubai: 11 Rashidiya Bus Stn - Al Awir Immigration; 25 Centrepoint MS - Gold Souq Bus Stn; 44 Al Ghubaiba Stn - Rashidiya; 310 Rashidiya Stn - Int'l City; 320 Rashidiya Stn - Academic City; F3 Rashidiya Stn - Mirdiff West; F5 Rashidiya Stn - Mizhar 1; F6 Rashidiya Stn - Al Rashidiya; F10 Rashidiya Stn - Dubai Safari Park; F60 Rashidiya Stn - Mirdiff 1; F61 Rashidiya Stn - Al Warqa; RTA Sharjah: 113 Al Rolla Terminal - Rashidiya Stn.; Ajman Transport Authority: DXB1-1 Al Musalla Bus Stn. - Rashidiya Stn.; DXB1-2 Al Musalla Bus Stn. - Rashidiya Stn.; DXB1-3 Al Musalla Bus Stn. - Rashidiya Stn.; DXB1-4 Al Musalla Bus Stn. - Rashidiya Stn.

Construction
- Accessible: yes

Other information
- Station code: 11 (Red Line); BR10 (Blue Line)
- Fare zone: 5

History
- Opened: September 9, 2009
- Former names: Rashidiya

Passengers
- 2011: 2.634 million ▲14.9%

Services
| Preceding station | Dubai Metro | Following station |
|---|---|---|
| Emirates towards Expo 2020 or Life Pharmacy | Red Line | Terminus |

Proposed services
| Preceding station | Dubai Metro | Following station |
|---|---|---|
| Terminus | Blue Line Centrepoint branch Opening 2029 | City Centre Mirdif towards Academic City |
Location

Centrepoint (Arabic: سنتربوينت; formerly Rashidiya) is a rapid transit station serving the Red Line of the Dubai Metro in Dubai, UAE.

The eastern terminus of the line, it is one of four metro stations with a park and ride lot, the others being E&, National Paints and Jumeirah Golf Estates.

== Location ==
Centrepoint station is located in Al Rashidiya, a community of northern Dubai. A residential area, most points of interest near the station are schools and community centres, although Centrepoint is the closest Metro station to the Dubai Airport Expo. The Dubai Royal Air Wing of the Dubai International Airport is located quite close to the station.

== History ==
As one of the initial stations of the Dubai Metro, Centrepoint opened on 9 September 2009; trains ran to Nakheel Harbour and Tower and served seven intermediate stations. In 2011, Centrepoint handled 2,634,139 passengers, making it one of the busiest stations on the Dubai Metro.

The station was previously known as Rashidiya; on 4 August 2021 it was renamed to Centrepoint.

On November 24, 2023, Sheikh Mohammed bin Rashid Al Maktoum approved the Blue Line Metro Project and the line will be extended from Centrepoint to International City via Mirdif and Al Warqa'a.

== Station layout ==
Centrepoint is one of the few stations of the Dubai Metro classed as a type 3 elevated station, indicating it has three tracks rather than the usual two. This allows trains to be held and stored easily. The tracks to and from Centrepoint parallel the southern side of Airport Road, continuing eastward to one of the network's depots.

| G | Street Level | Exit/ Entrance |
| L1 | Mezzanine | Fare control, station agent, Metro Card vending machines, crossover |
| L2 | Platform 3 Westbound | Towards ← Al Fardan Exchange / Life Pharmacy / Expo 2020; Next Station: Emirates |
| L2 | Island platform | P2 Doors will open on the right | P3 Doors will open on the left |
| L2 | Platform 2 Westbound | Towards ← Life Pharmacy / Expo 2020; Next Station: Emirates |
| L2 | Platform 1 Eastbound | Towards → Train Terminates Here |
| L2 | Side platform | Doors will open on the right |
| L2 | Note: | (Towards Al Fardan Exchange - Operational during peak hours) |

M4 Station layout

| G | Street level | Exit/Entrance |
| L1 | Mezzanine | Automatic Fare Collection gates, station agent, crossover |
| L2 | Side platform | Doors will open on the right |
| L2 | Platform # Westbound | Towards ← Train Terminates Here |
| L2 | Platform # Northbound | Towards → Academic City; Next Station: City Centre Mirdif |
| L2 | Side platform | Doors will open on the right |
