= List of shopping malls in Dubai =

This is a list of shopping malls/shopping centres in Dubai, United Arab Emirates.

== Malls in Dubai ==
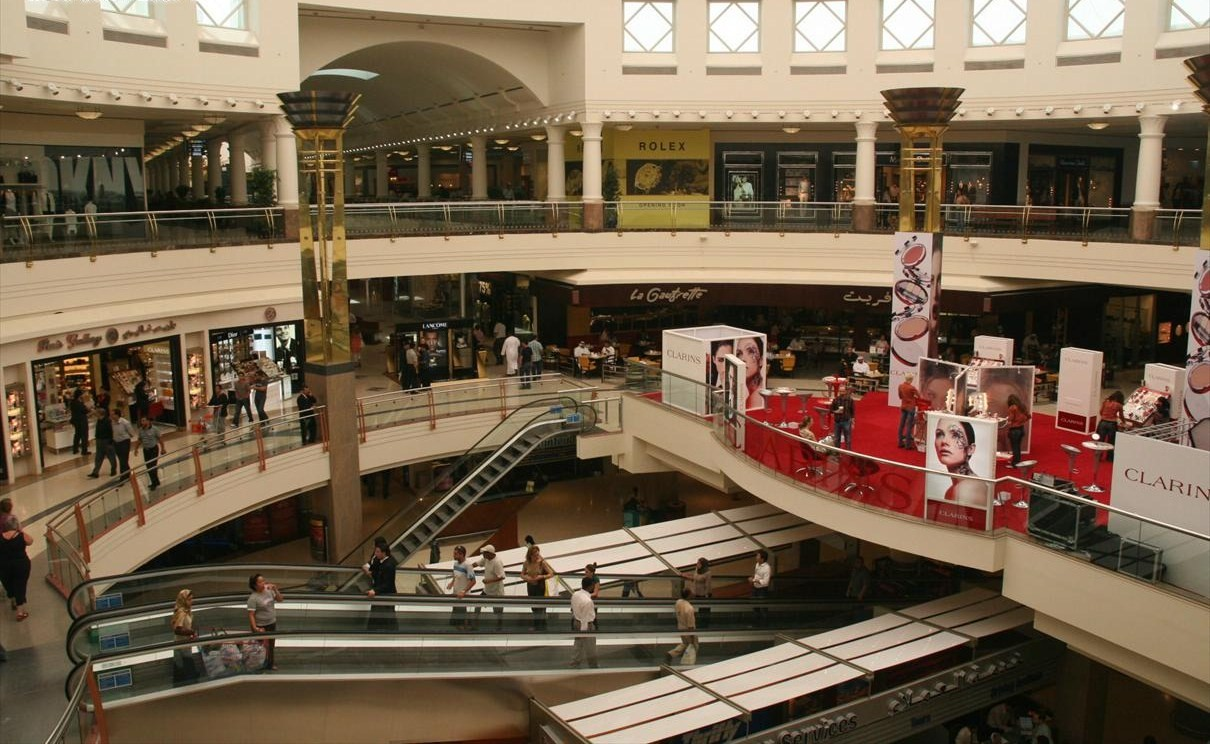
City Centre Deira

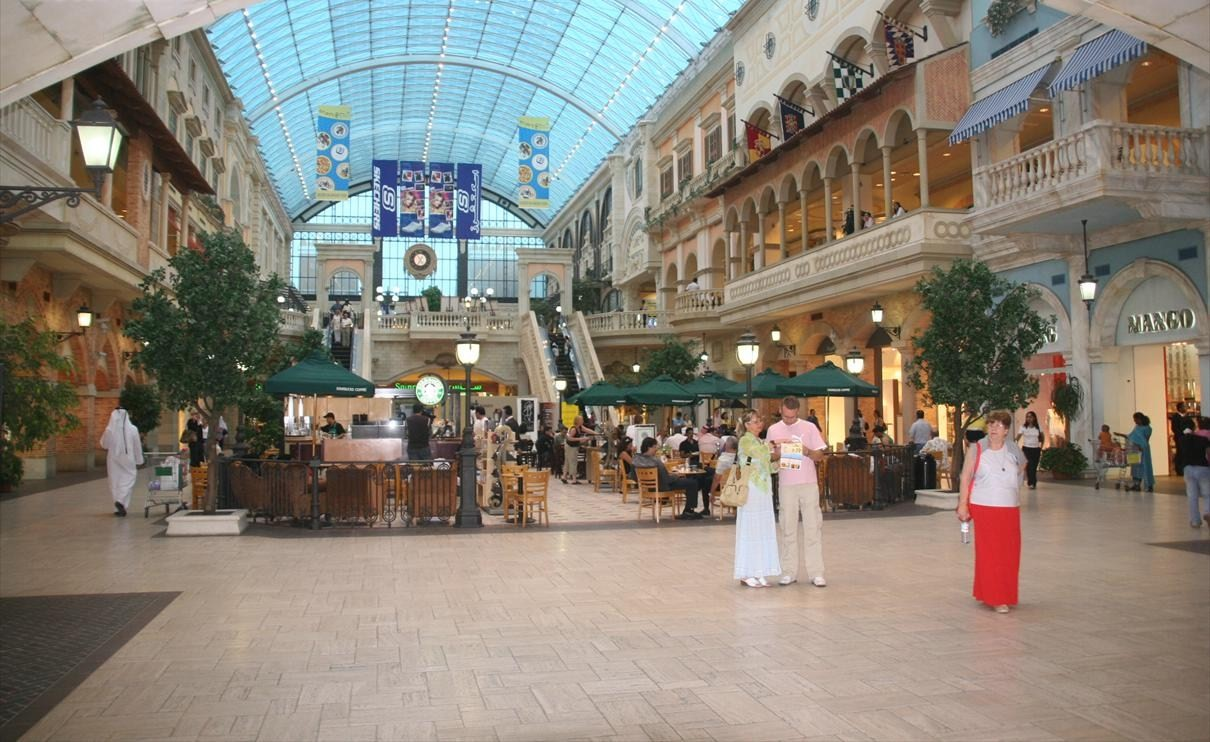
Mercato Shopping Mall

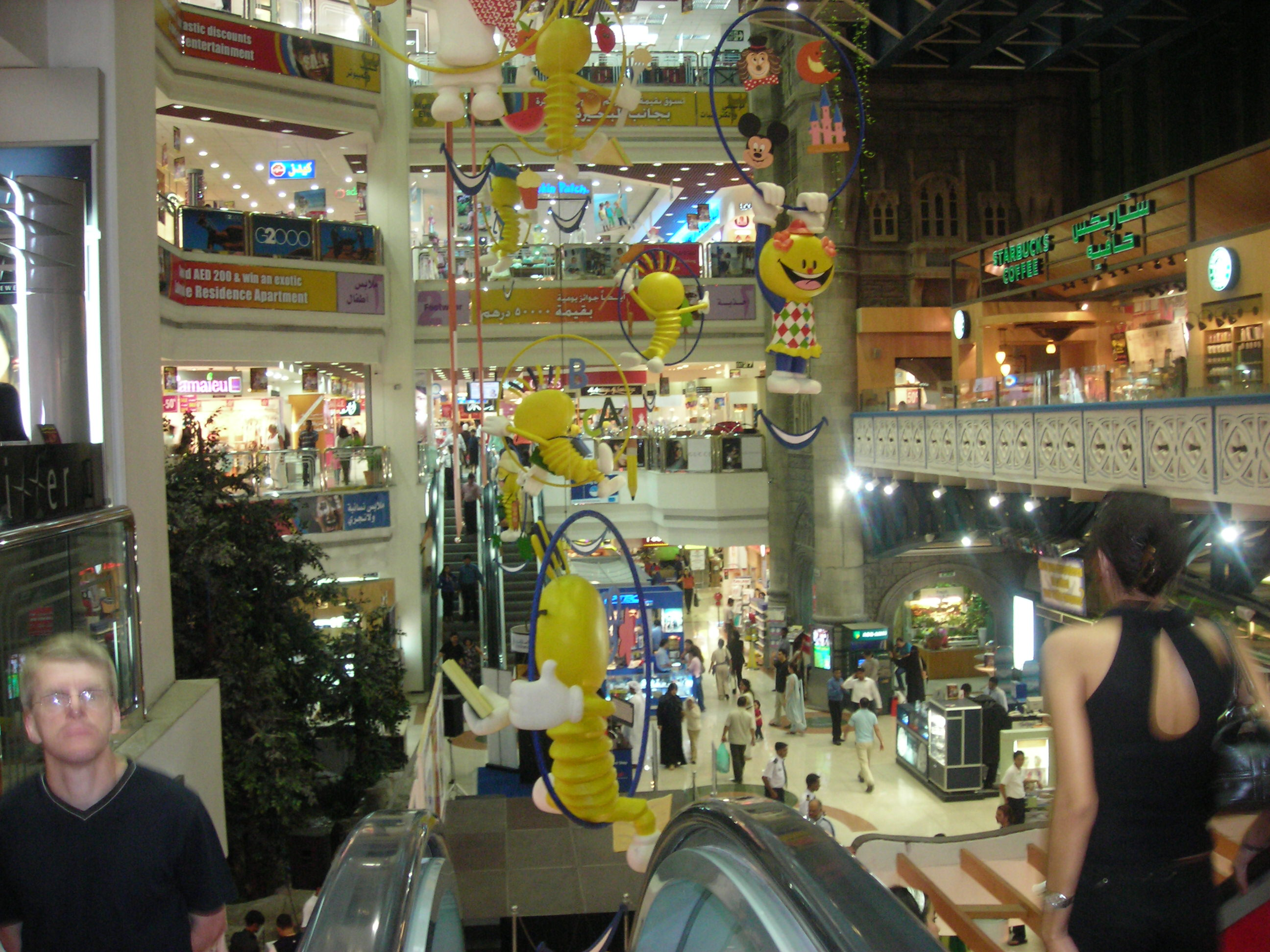
Dubai Lamcy Plaza

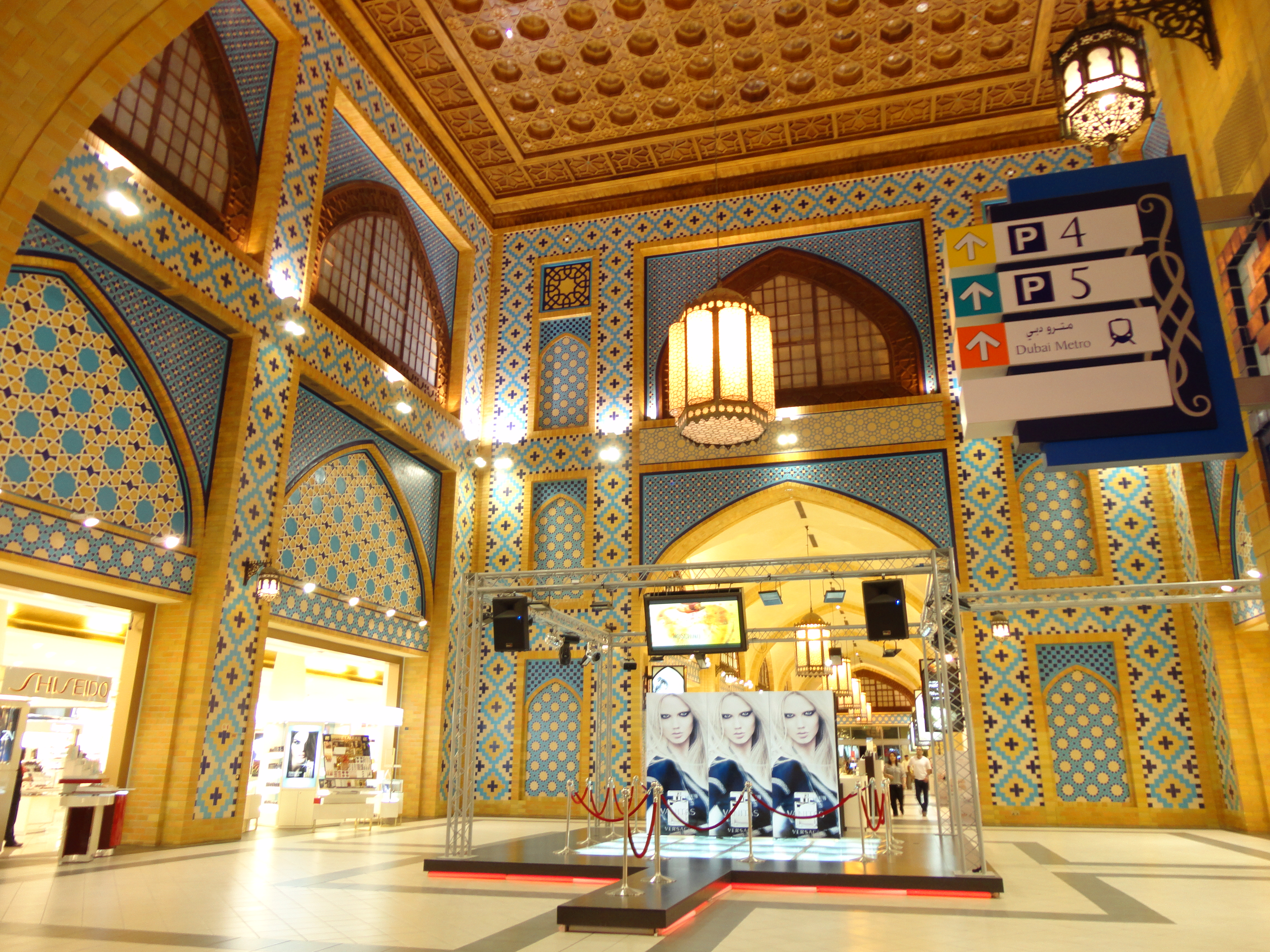
Ibn Battuta Mall Persian Court

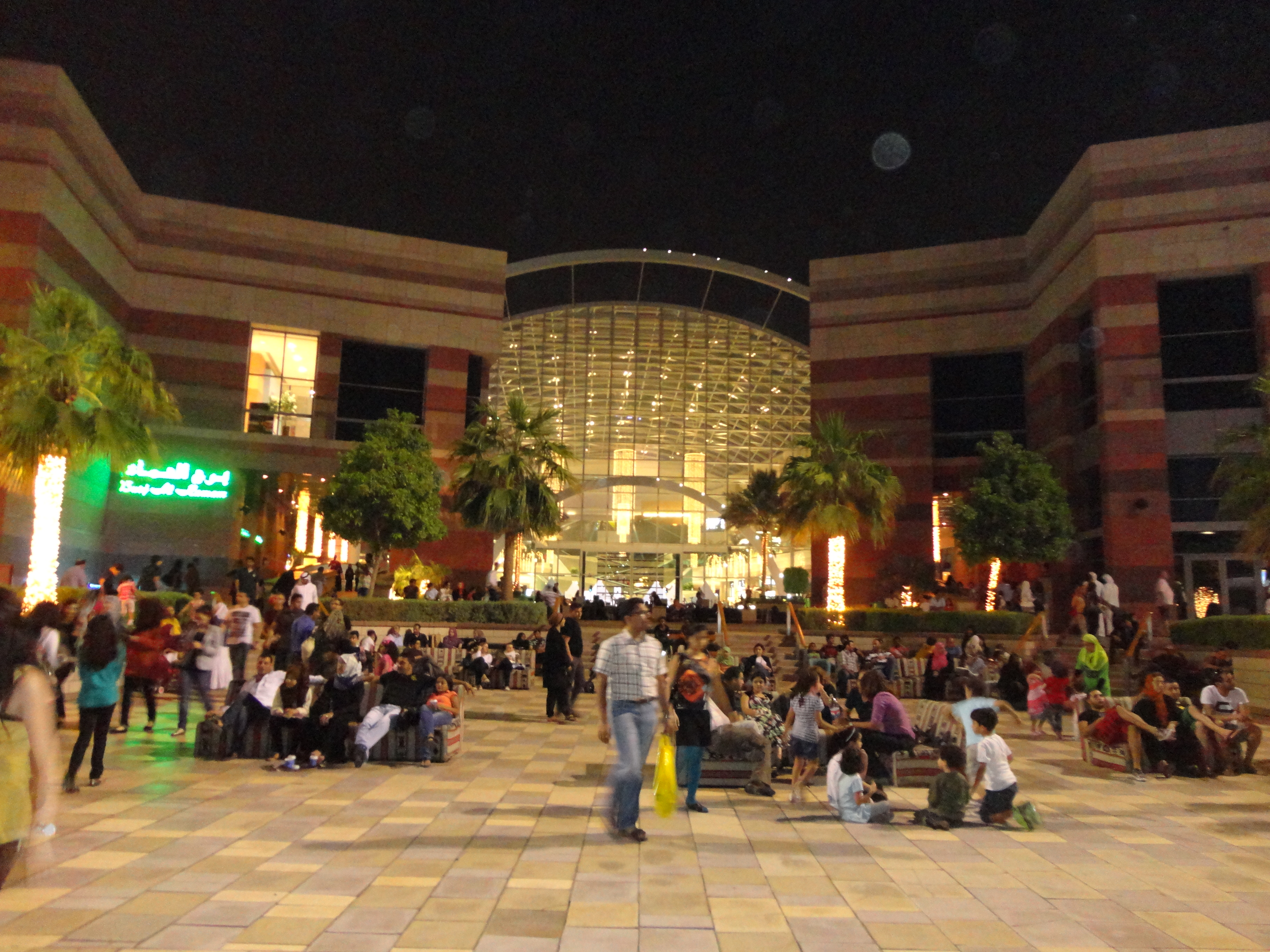
Dubai Festival City Mall

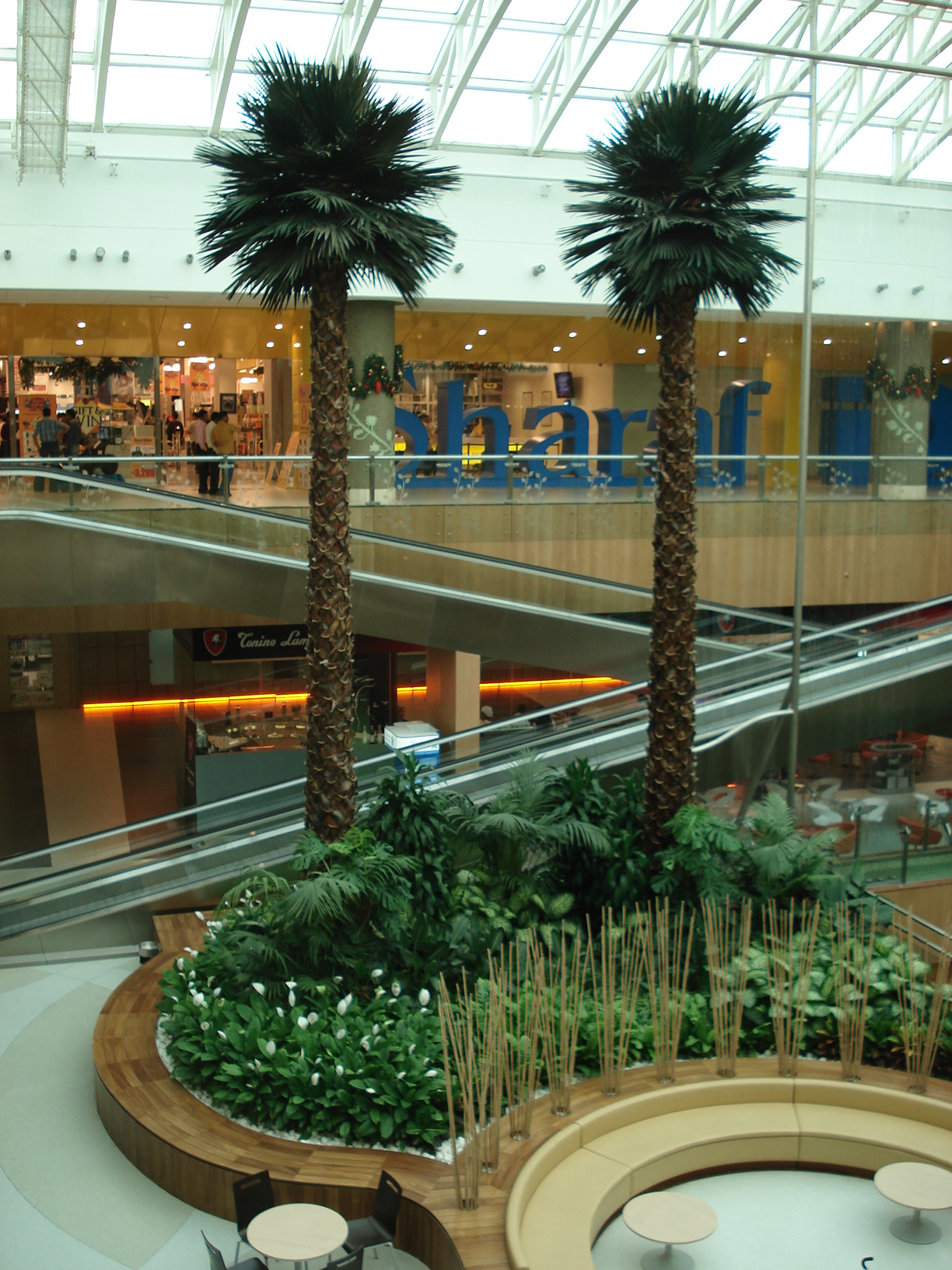
Times Square Center Dubai

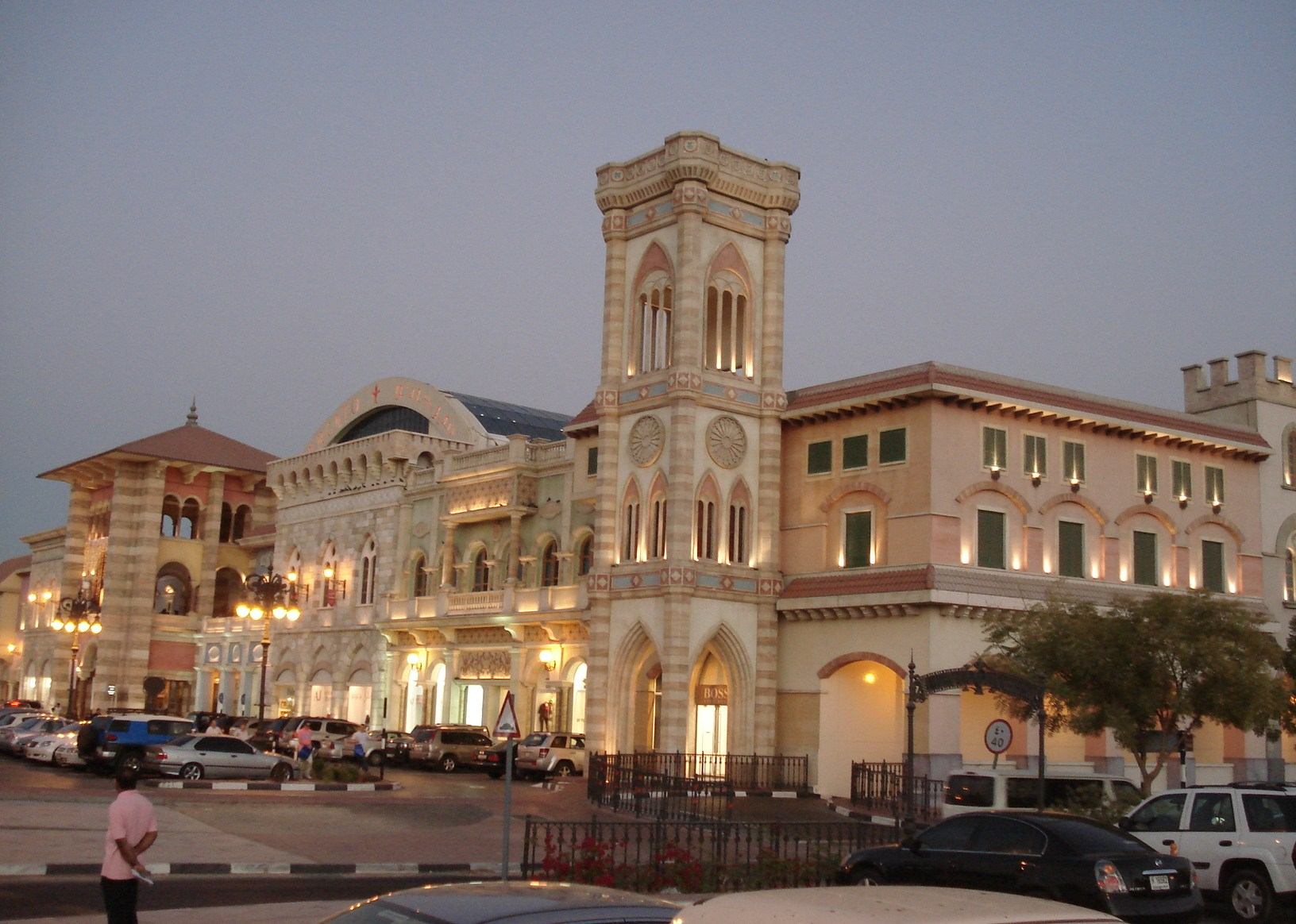
Mercato Mall

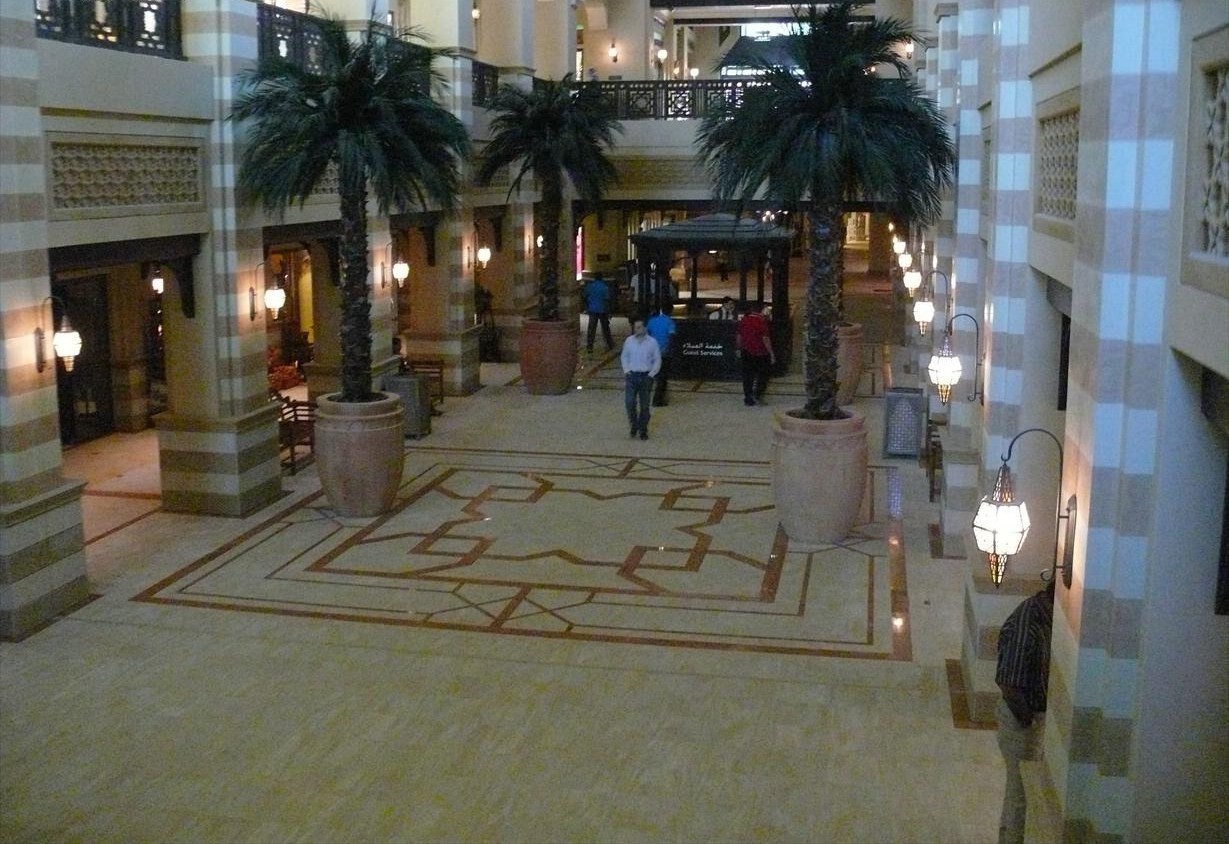
Souk Al Bahar

Mall	Location	Gross lease-able area	Number of stores	Remarks / references
Dubai Mall	Downtown Dubai	350,000 m^{2} (3.77 million sq ft), Total retail floor area is 12.1 million square feet (112 ha).	1200	World's most-visited shopping and leisure destination, attracted more than 65 million visitors in 2012.
Mall of the Emirates	Al Barsha	223,000 m^{2} (2,400,000 sq ft)	520	Entire mall is 6,500,000 square feet (600,000 m^{2}).
City Centre Deira	Deira	121,000 m^{2} (1,300,000 sq ft)	340	Opened on 27 August 1995.
Mercato Shopping Mall	Jumeirah	22,947 m^{2} (247,000 sq ft)	140+	
BurJuman	Bur Dubai		300	
Palm Jumeriah Mall	Palm Jumeirah		350	Opened on January 1st, 2020, the mall's name was later changed to Palm Jumeriah Mall.
Festival City Mall	Dubai Festival City			Contains a bay-walk market, with outdoor restaurants, as well as occasional waterfall displays outside the mall (at the side facing the Creek)
Ibn Battuta Mall	Sheikh Zayed Road	28,000 m^{2} (301,000 sq ft)	150	Opened in 2005, this mall is currently the largest themed mall in the world.
Oasis Mall Dubai	Sheikh Zayed Road 2nd Interchange	1.44 million sq. ft	100+	This medium-sized mall contains a Carrefour supermarket, clinics and a Centerpoint store.
Wafi Mall	Sheikh Rashid Road	80,000 m^{2} (861,113 sq ft)	200	An Egyptian-styled mall.
Al Ghurair Centre	Deira		+200	A popular shopping destinations serving its surrounding neighborhoods, which is next to an outdoor market.
Century Mall Dubai	Al Mamzar	150,000 sq ft (14,000 m^{2})		
Dubai Marina Mall	Dubai Marina			
Dubai Outlet Mall	Dubai Outlet City		+240	
Grand Shopping Mall	Al Quoz Industrial Area 1	40,000 sq ft (3,700 m^{2})	20	
The Pointe	Palm Jumeirah		+190	
Souk Madinat	Al Sufouh			
Souk Al Bahar	Downtown Burj Dubai			A mall with little shops; near Dubai Mall, connected via bridge.
Times Square Center	Sheikh Zayed Road			
Arabian Center	Al Khawaneej Road	80,000 m^{2} (861,000 sq ft)	200	
Bin Hendi Avenue	Garhoud			
Bolevoured Emirates Tower	Emirates Towers			
The Village	Jumeirah Beach Road			
Abaya Mall	Mirdif, Dubai			Specializes in abayas and other traditional clothing for women.
Abraj Shopping Center	Deira, Dubai			
Al Barsha Mall	Al Barsha 2, Dubai			
Al Hail Shopping Center	Deira, Dubai			
Al Dhiyafah Center	Al Dhiyafah Road			
Al Futtaim Center	Deira			
Al Hana Center	Al Satwa			
Al Mamzar Shopping Center	Al Mamzar			
Al Mamzar Shopping Center	Deira			
Al Manal Centre	Deira			
Al Maydan Shopping Center	Deira			
Al Musalla Tower	Bur Dubai			
Al Rais Shopping Center	Bur Dubai			
Al Twar Shopping Center				
B1 Mall	Al Barsha 1, Dubai			
Beach Center	Jumeirah Beach Road			
Bin Sougat Shopping Center	Al Rashidiya			
Dana Shopping Center	Deira			
Dubai Shopping Center	Deira			
Dune Center	Al Dhiyafah street			
Dubai Gold and Diamond Park	Deira			
Hamarain Shopping Centre	Deira			
Holiday Centre	Holiday Inn Crown Plaza Hotel			
Karama Shopping Centre	Karama			
LuLu Centre	Karama			
LuLu Hypermarket	Al Qusais			
LuLu Village	Muhaisnah			
Magrudy's Enterprise	Jumeirah Beach Road			
Mazaya Shopping Centre	Sheikh Zayed Road			
Reef Mall	Deira			
Safest Way Shopping Complex	Sheikh Zayed Road			
The Galleria	Hyatt Regency			
The Intercontinental Plaza	Inter-Continental Hotel			
Town Centre Jumeirah	Jumeirah Beach Road			
Twin Towers Shopping Centres	Deira, Dubai			The mall is largely unused, with some operational stores and restaurants
Villa Mod	Sheikh Zayed Road			
Warba Centre	Deira, Dubai			
City Centre Mirdif	Mirdif	3,116,451 sq ft (289,527.8 m^{2})	430-450	
Al Ittihad Mall	Muhaisnah			
Sunset Mall	Jumeirah Beach Road	1,000,000 sq ft (93,000 m^{2})	100	Opened in December, 2011
Dragon Mart	Dubai-Hatta road	150,000 sq m	6,000 shops and kiosks	
The Galleria Mall	Al Wasl Road	65,000 sq ft (6,000 m^{2})	35	Opened in 2014
City Center Me'aisem	International Media Production Zone	23,850 sq ft (2,216 m^{2})	Unknown	Opened on 1 September 2015
Golden Mile Galleria	Palm Jumeirah	400,000 sq ft (37,000 m^{2})		
Dubai Hills Mall	Dubai Hills Estate		750	
Cityland Mall	Beside Global Village		+ 350	
Damac Mall	Damac Hills	110,000 Sq ft	30 shops	Opened in September 2023
Circle Mall	Jumeriah Village Circle		235 shops, restaurants and outlets	
Art of Living Mall	Al Barsha 2	50,000 m^{2} (540,000 sq ft)		
Warsan Souk	Dubai International City	650,000 Sq ft	1,170 shops	Properties owned by Nakheel properties
SouqExtra	Al Barsha, Muhaisnah, Al Quoz, Dubai World Central, Ewan Residences, Dubai Silicon Oasis			SouqExtra is a chain of smaller shopping centers, under construction in different locations of Dubai.
Mirdif Avenue Mall	Near Arabian Centre across Khanaweej St.			A small mall containing a few retail stores, a Grandiose Supermarket and cafes

== Malls under construction ==
Mall	Location	GLA	Number of stores	Remarks
Grand City Mall Jebel Ali	Downtown Jebel Ali	538,000 sq ft (50,000 m^{2})	5000	Construction started in April 2007
India Mart	Dubai International City			
Palm Mall	Palm Deira			On hold
Great Dubai Mall	Dubai International City			
Dubai Square	Dubai Creek Harbour	6,100,000 sq ft (570,000 m^{2})	8,500	
Meydan One Mall	Meydan One	258,300 sq ft (24,000 m^{2})	700	
Mushrif Mall	Al Khawaneej Road	53,000 sq ft (4,900 m^{2})	126	Construction picked up in April 2018. Expected completion May 2019.
Deira Mall	Deira Islands	10,305,767.00 Sq ft	1,000 shops, cafés, restaurants and entertainment	On hold
Grand City Mall Al Quoz	Al Quoz		None; an operational Grand Hypermarket currently	The mall is semi-operational, with more stores planned to emerge

== Cancelled/stalled malls ==
Mall	Location	Remarks
Mall of Arabia	Dubailand	Remained stalled and cancelled due to the 2008 financial crisis

== In popular culture ==
In September 2011, a music video about the Malls of Dubai by a Dubai resident Rohit Iyengar went viral on the video sharing site YouTube.

== Image gallery ==
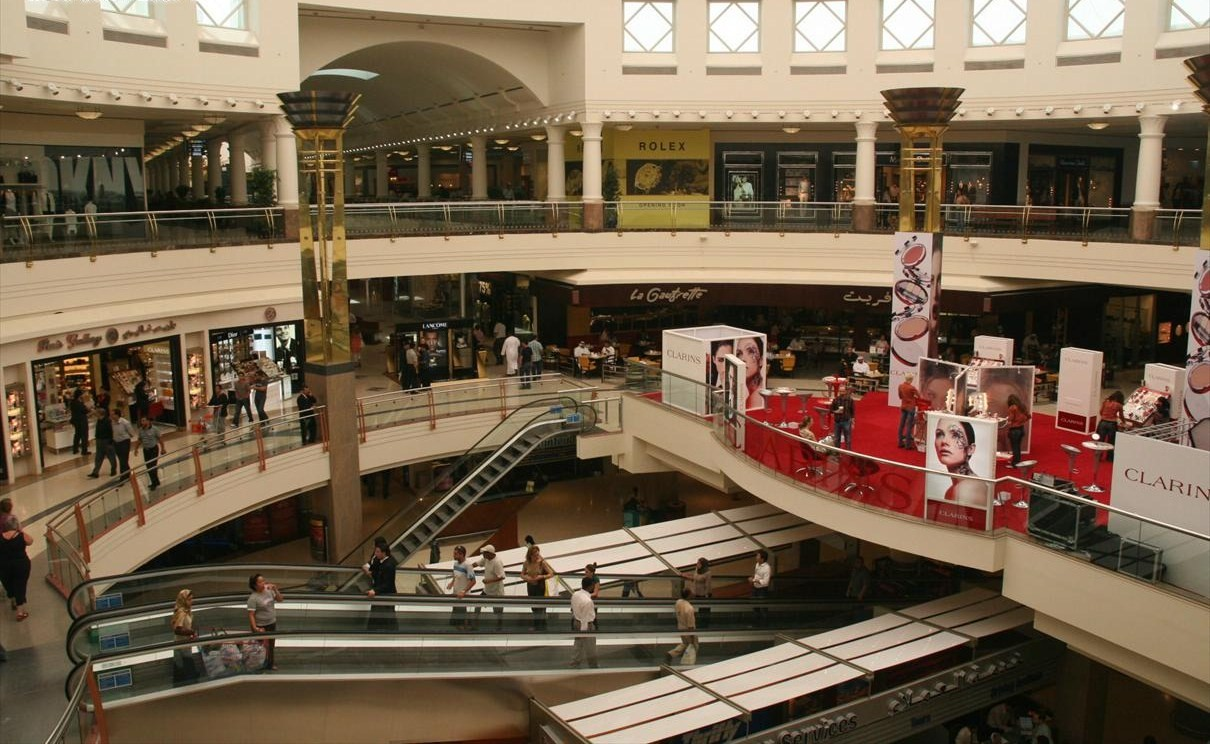
Deira City Centre

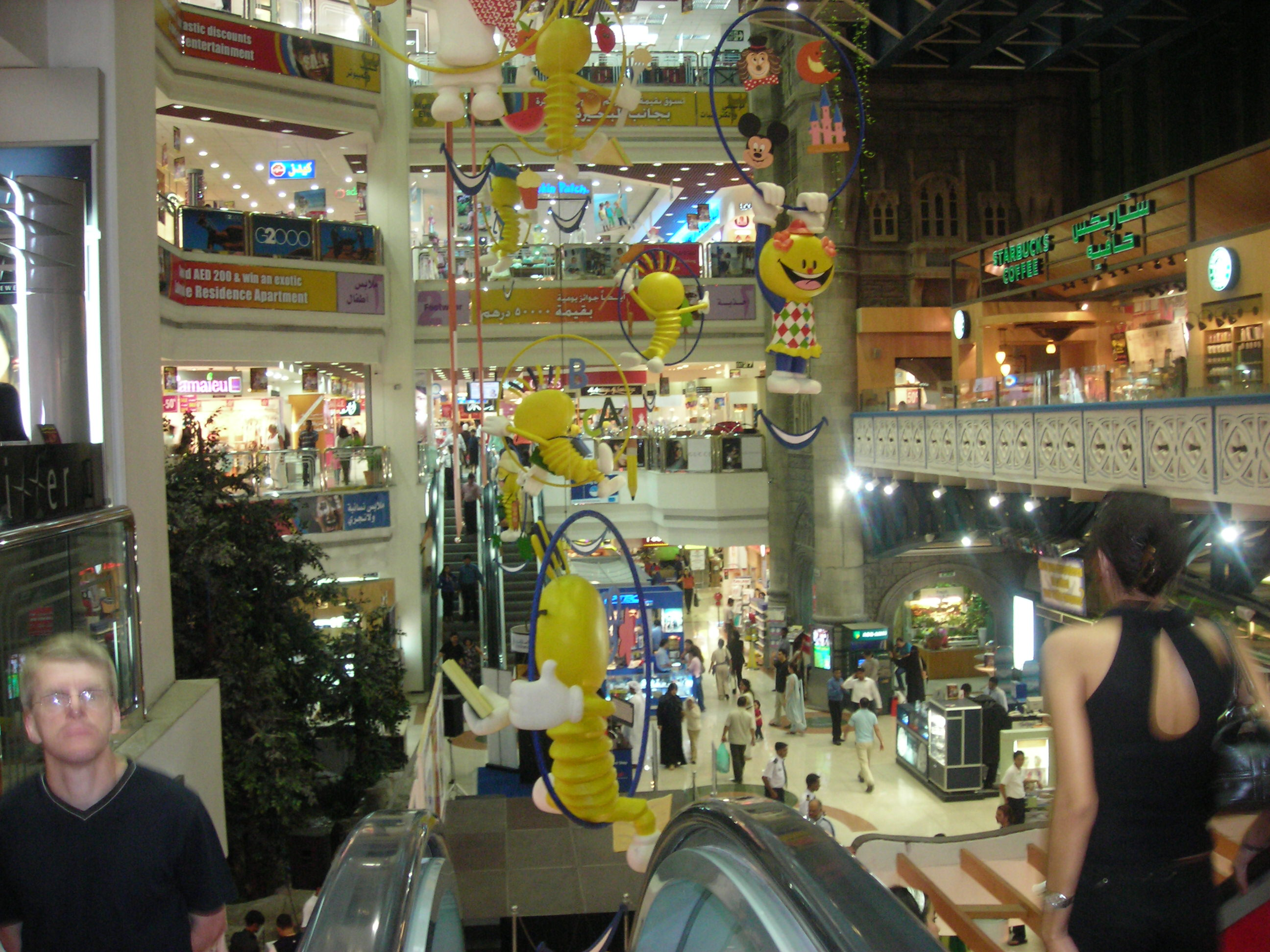
Dubai Lamcy plaza

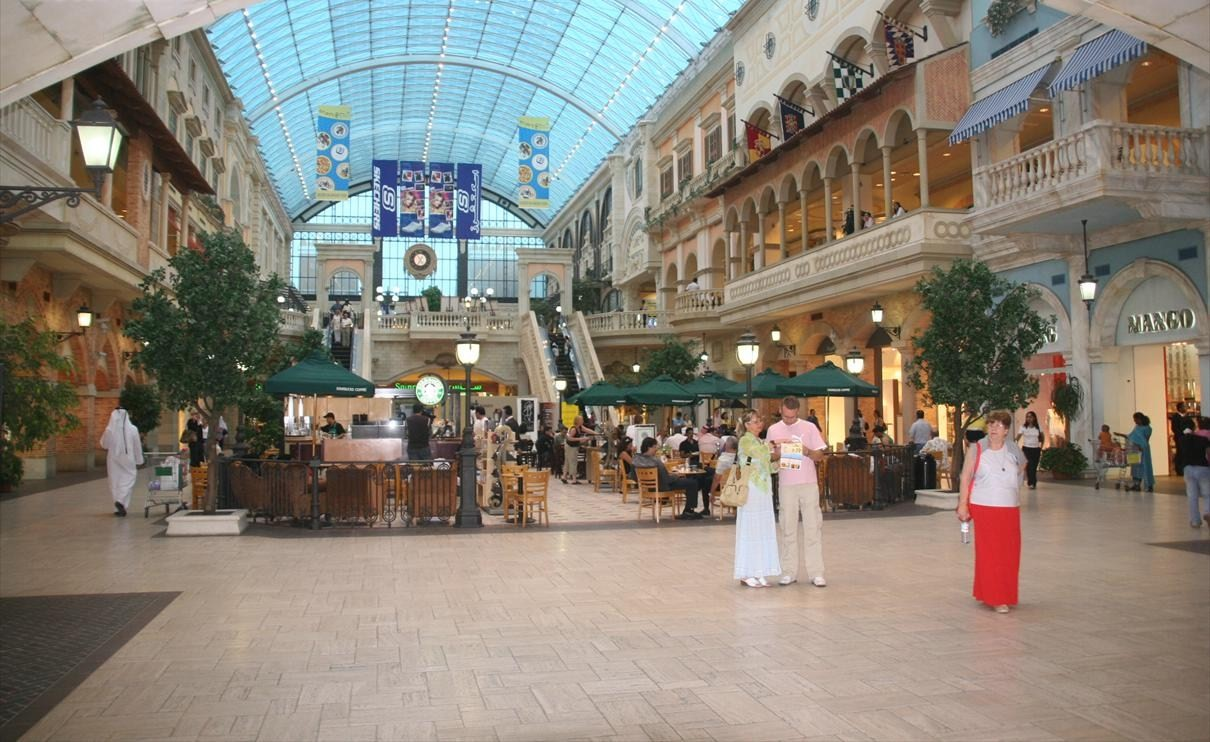
Mercato shopping mall

Cityland Mall

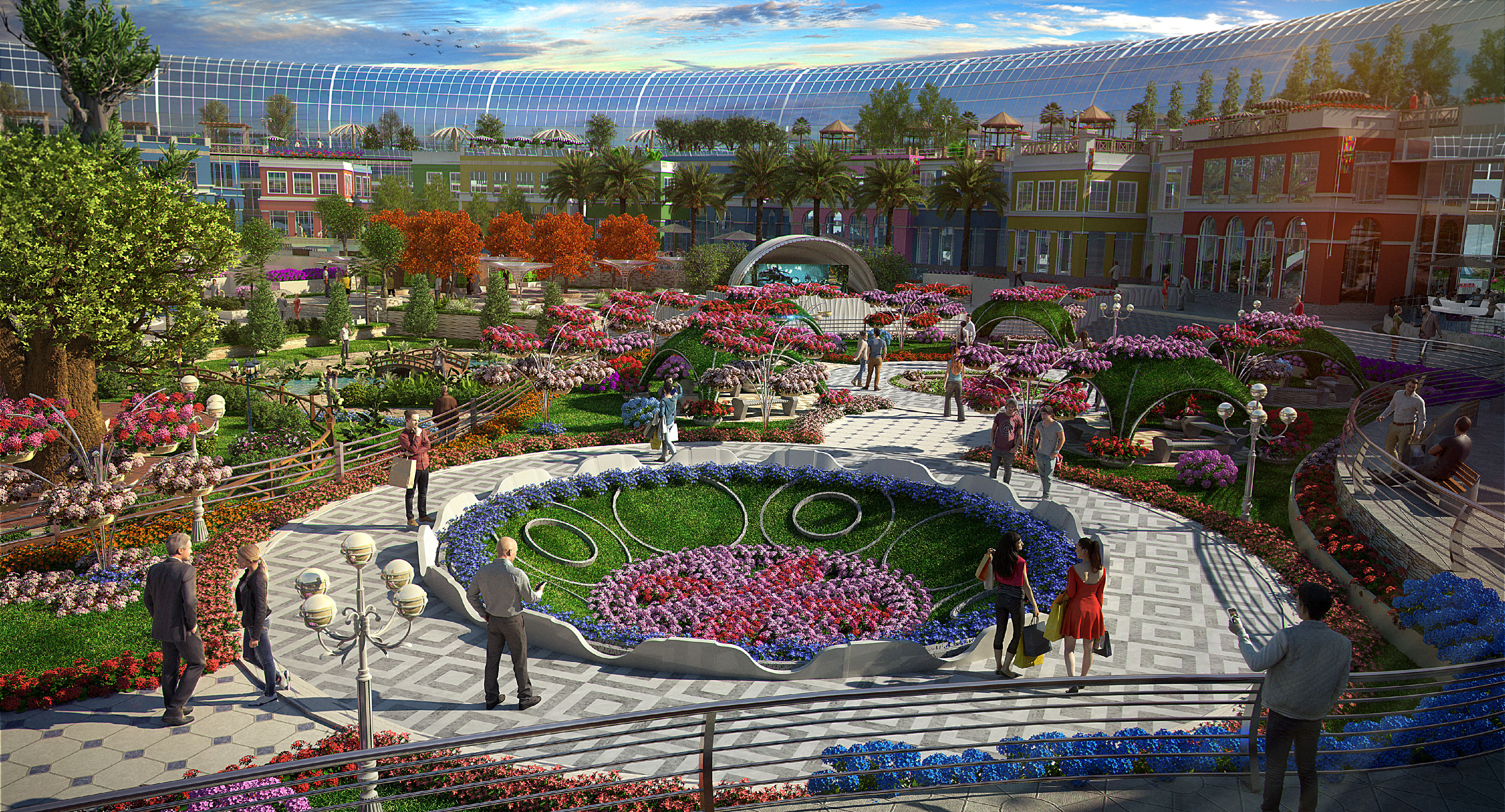
Cityland Mall Central Park

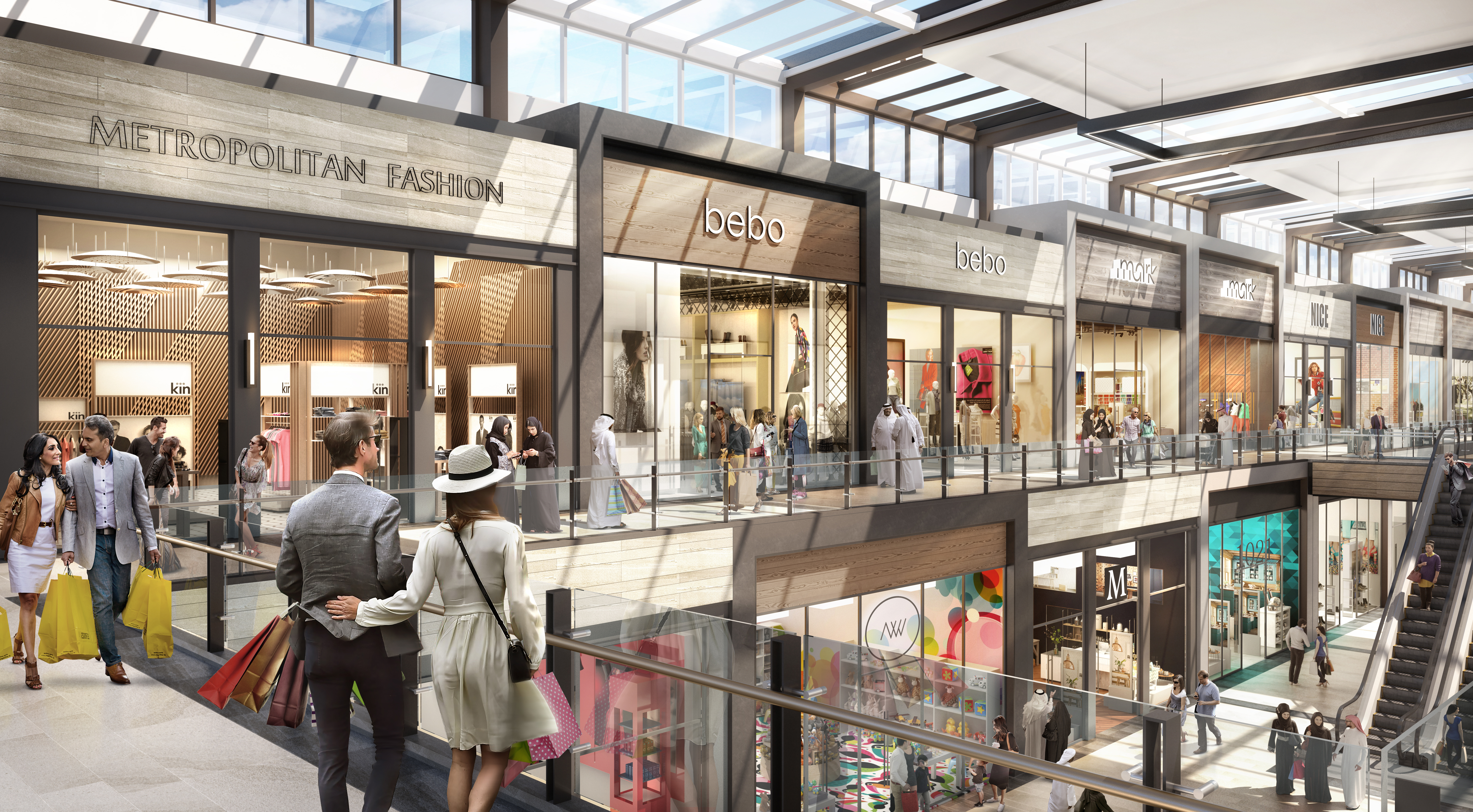
Dubai Hills Mall

== See also ==
- List of buildings in Dubai
- List of shopping malls in the United Arab Emirates
- Mall of the Emirates
