= Art of Living Mall =

The Art of Living Mall
- Location: Dubai, UAE
- Coordinates: 25.1046°N 55.2282°E
- Opened: 2023
- Website: artoflivingmall.com

Art of Living Mall is a shopping center located in Dubai, United Arab Emirates. It opened in 2023 and is situated in the Al Barsha 2 area, along Umm Suqeim Road. It is the first shopping mall in the UAE specializing in furniture, home appliances, and home accessories, and the largest in the Middle East and North Africa (MENA) region.

As of 2025, there are 35 stores in the mall.

== Overview ==
The mall occupies an area of approximately 50,000 square metres across three levels. It specialises in home furniture, décor items, children’s furniture, outdoor furniture, and home accessories.

== See also ==
- List of shopping malls in Dubai
- Dubai Festival City Mall
