= The Grand Marriage =

2013 Comoran documentary film

- Directed by: Faisal Al Otaibi
- Starring: Elias
- Production company: Al Jazeera
- Distributed by: Al Jazeera
- Release date: 16 April 2013 (Dubai)
- Running time: 50 minutes
- Country: Comoros

The Grand Marriage also known as Comoros: The Grand Marriage is a 2013 Comoran documentary film directed by Saudi Arabian filmmaker Faisal Al Otaibi and executive produced by Al Jazeera. The film is based on the traditional grand marriage which is popular in Comoros. The film depicts the story about the grand marriage of a Comoran government minister and his two wives. The couple which played the lead role in the film are married in real life for over 20 years. The film was screened in the 2013 Gulf Film Festival at the Dubai Festival City.
