= Amira Nature Foods =

Food company based in the United Arab Emirates

Amira Nature Foods Ltd
- Type: Public
- Traded as: Expert Market: ANFIF (formerly NYSE: RYCE, delisted on August 18, 2020)
- Industry: Agribusiness
- Founded: 1915
- Founder: B.D. Chanana
- Headquarters: Dubai, United Arab Emirates
- Area served: Worldwide
- Key people: Karan A. Chanana (Chairman)
- Products: Rice, organic ingredients, pulses, oil, spices
- Revenue: ▼$64.4 million USD (2019)
- Net income: ▼$-357.88 million USD (2019)
- Number of employees: 27
- Website: www.amira.net

Amira Nature Foods Ltd is a food company primarily engaged in the distribution of basmati rice and related food products.

Amira is a public company trading over the counter since it was removed from public listing on the New York Stock Exchange in August 2020. The company was delisted after repeatedly missed deadlines for filing its financial reports with the U.S. Securities and Exchange Commission.

Amira Nature Foods Ltd is a parent company, registered in the British Virgin Islands and headquartered in Dubai, United Arab Emirates. The parent company wholly owns multiple subsidiary companies engaged in global rice distribution. The company owns 49.8% of Amira Pure Foods Private Limited (referred to as "Amira India"), after a debt restructuring agreement with the company's creditors in November 2018 reduced Amira's ownership stake from 80.4%. Amira India produces basmati rice by ageing and processing rice.

== History ==
Amira Nature Foods Ltd was founded in 1915 under the name Nav Bharat by B.D. Chanana, is as a trading house that buys and sells locally grown beans. The company was later taken over by B.D. Chanana's son, Karam Chanana. In 1968, the third generation of the family, Anil Chanana, joined the company, changed the name to Amira, and began focusing on exporting. Karan A. Chanana, the current chairman, is the fourth generation of his family to run the company.

The company is headquartered in Dubai, United Arab Emirates, with additional offices in India, Germany, the United Kingdom and the United States and Canada.

Since 2008, the company has been selling products under its Amira brand.

Amira Nature Foods Ltd went public on the New York Stock Exchange in October 2012. In December 2013, in an effort to further expand into the European market, Amira announced a deal to purchase Basmati Rice GmbH, a Germany-based distributor of rice, primarily basmati. It was the company's first acquisition since going public.

In 2014, Amira Pure Foods announced an e-retailing partnership with Snapdeal to sell its basmati rice online.

=== Recent history and financial difficulties ===
In March 2018, the company recognized an impairment of US$134 million as a result of quality deterioration of stored rice.

Until 2018, Amira Nature Foods Ltd was the parent company of Amira Pure Foods, an Indian company that operates a 310,000 square-foot processing and milling facility in basmati rice paddy-producing regions of North India. In November 2018, Amira Nature Foods Ltd reduced its ownership of subsidiary company Amira India from 80.4% to 49.8%. This debt restructuring reduced Amira India's indebtedness from US$250.23 million to $35.08 million. As a result of the reduction in ownership below 50%, Amira India is no longer a subsidiary of Amira Nature Foods Ltd and is not included in the consolidated financial statement. This significant change in the company structure saw the total assets of Amira Nature Foods Ltd decrease from $512.8 million in 2018 to only $26.2 million in 2019, and accordingly the financial results from 2019 onwards are not comparable with the results from previous years.

In its regulatory filings for March 2019 (published 19th August 2020), Amira reported revenues of US$64.4 million and losses of US$-357.88 million. The company's auditor indicated "substantial doubt" as to Amira's ability to continue as a going concern. The company reported that it was being pursued in the Indian courts under section 9 of the Insolvency and Bankruptcy Code, with a lender seeking repayment of a loan of $14.1 million. Amira cited the cause as being an inability to serve its debts and pay the liabilities.

On August 18, 2020, Amira Nature Food Ltd's ordinary shares were suspended from trading on the New York Stock Exchange due to non-timely filing of the company's 2019 and 2020 annual report.

The company's shares were permanently removed from listing and registration on the New York Stock Exchange on December 29 2020. The NYSE determined that the company was not suitable for listing because of delays and non-publication of its 2019 and 2020 annual reports. Amira Nature Foods Ltd had appealed the August 18 notice, but formally withdrew their appeal on December 14, 2020. While the company had filed its 2019 report, its 2020 Report remains unpublished and the company has failed to publish any annual reports since.

== Products ==
Amira sells basmati rice grown at the foothills of the Himalayas, purchased from smallholder farmers in India. Following harvest, the rice is typically aged for a year in burlap sacks to help bring out the rice's aromatic flavor, after which the grain's husk is removed. The rice is then processed in Delhi, India, by Amira India, before being distributed, marketed and sold at retail and wholesale chains worldwide.

The company's basmati, sold in metallic gold packaging, is said to have "a strong floral, nutty scent and flavor after cooking." Other products include specialty and organic rice, cooking oil, spices, flour and organic wheat, barley and legumes.

== Financial performance ==
Amira Nature Foods Ltd publishes annual financial reports with the U.S. Securities and Exchange Commission in Form 20-F.

US Dollars (Millions)
	March 31, 2021	March 31, 2020	March 31, 2019	March 31, 2018	March 31, 2017	March 31, 2016	March 31, 2015
Revenue	Filing overdue	Filing overdue	$64.4	$413.9	$551.8	$563.5	$700.0
Profit/Loss	Filing overdue	Filing overdue	-$357.9	-$93.6	$31.5	$32.9	$53.2

Note: Following the deconsolidation of Amira India from Amira Nature Foods Ltd, financial performance since 2019 is no longer comparable with pre-2019 financial years. The total assets of Amira Nature Foods Ltd decreased from $512.8 million in 2018 to only $26.2 million in 2019 as a result of the deconsolidation of Amira India.

== Company structure ==
Amira Nature Foods Ltd is a holding company with no direct operations. The company owns a number of subsidiary and associate companies.

Amira Nature Food Ltd's Subsidiaries
Name of company	Country of incorporation or establishment	Equity interest held
Amira Nature Foods Ltd (“Amira Mauritius”)	Mauritius	100% by Amira Nature Foods Ltd
Amira International Finance B.V.	Netherlands	100% by Amira Nature Foods Ltd
Red Reinel Limited	Mauritius	100% by Amira Mauritius
Amira I Grand Foods Inc.	British Virgin Islands	100% by Amira Mauritius
Amira Basmati Rice GmbH EUR	Germany	100% by Amira Mauritius
Basmati Rice North America LLC	United States	100% by Amira I Grand Foods Inc. (BVI)
Amira K.A. Foods International DMCC	United Arab Emirates	100% by Amira I Grand Foods Inc. (BVI)
Amira G Foods Limited	United Kingdom	100% by Amira I Grand Foods Inc. (BVI)

Amira Nature Foods Associate Companies
Name of company	Country of incorporation or establishment	Equity interest held
Amira Pure Foods Private Limited (“Amira India”)	India	49.8% by Amira Mauritius

== Ownership ==
Karan A. Chanana is the majority shareholder of Amira Nature Foods Ltd, owning 65% of the ordinary shares.

== Financial allegations ==
In February 2015, a short selling firm alleged that Amira had overstated its revenue. Amira filed a lawsuit against the short selling firm later in 2015, calling its reports factually inaccurate and false. In April 2017, Amira announced a settlement was reached in the lawsuit filed against the short selling firm, related entities and individuals.

Following the allegations in 2015, two proposed shareholder class action lawsuits (which were subsequently consolidated into one) were filed against Amira in the United States. The company contested the allegations in the Class Action and filed a motion to dismiss the Class Action. On 22 August 2016, Amira announced that the United States District Court for the Central District of California had granted the company's motion to throw out the lawsuit.

== See also ==
- List of rice cultivars
- Al Nassma Chocolate
