= InterContinental Dubai Festival City =

Hotel in Dubai, UAE

- The InterContinental hotel at night, with the Crowne Plaza hotel on the left
- Interactive map of the InterContinental Dubai Festival City area

General information
- Location: Festival City, Dubai, United Arab Emirates
- Coordinates: 25.22351°N 55.34973°E
- Opening: 2007
- Operator: IHG Hotels & Resorts

Technical details
- Floor count: 35 (including 1 basement floor)

Design and construction
- Architect: 3D/International

Website
- dubaifestivalcityhotels.com/intercontinental

InterContinental Dubai Festival City is a luxury five-star hotel in Dubai Festival City, United Arab Emirates, operated by IHG Hotels & Resorts. It is located on the Dubai Creek, adjoining the Dubai Festival City Mall, opposite the Mohammed Bin Rashid Library, with the Burj Khalifa behind in the distance. It is also close to Dubai International Airport.

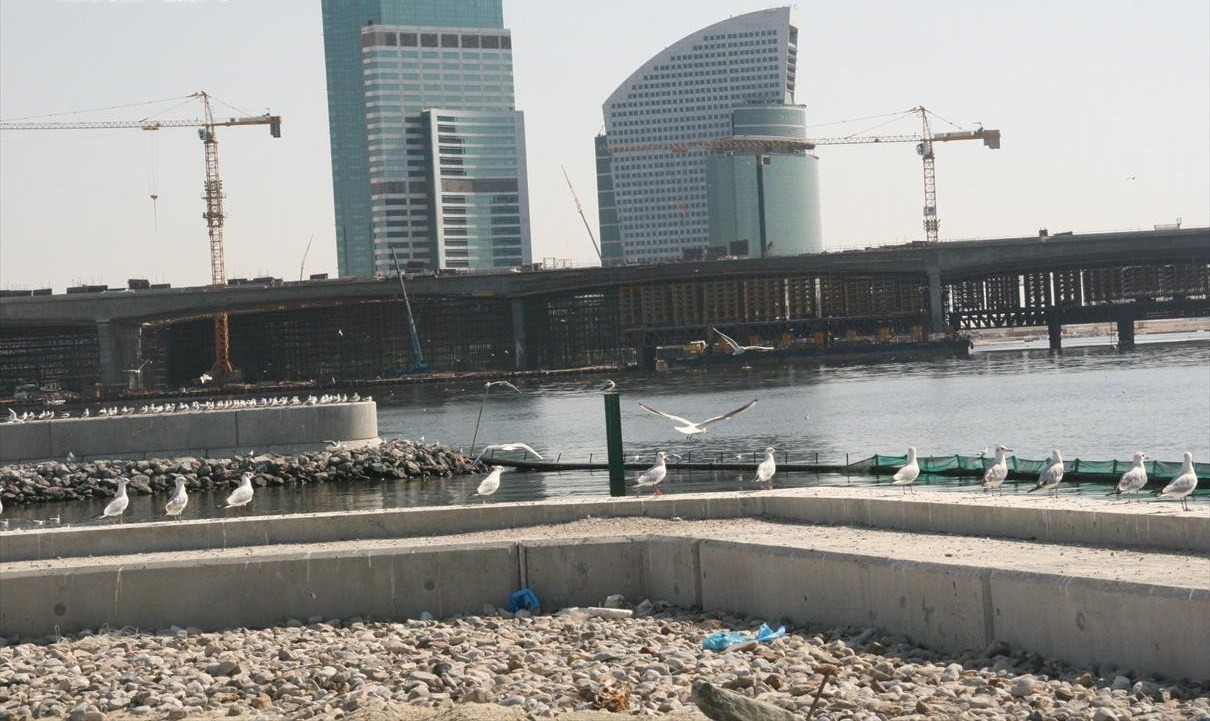
The hotel in the distance in 2007, when new, with the Business Bay Crossing under construction in the foreground

Construction of the hotel started in 2005, and it was completed by 2007. The architect of the hotel was 3D/International.

The structure of the hotel is based on that of sailboats, with a curved facade facing the Dubai Creek, providing a panoramic view of Dubai. The hotel is used for both business and leisure.

The hotel has 34 storeys. It features dining by the three-Michelin-starred chef Pierre Gagnaire. A glass-bottomed swimming pool protrudes from the building. The hotel is one of several IHG hotels in Dubai Festival City. It adjoins a Crowne Plaza hotel. Close to the hotel is the InterContinental Residence Suites Dubai Festival City.

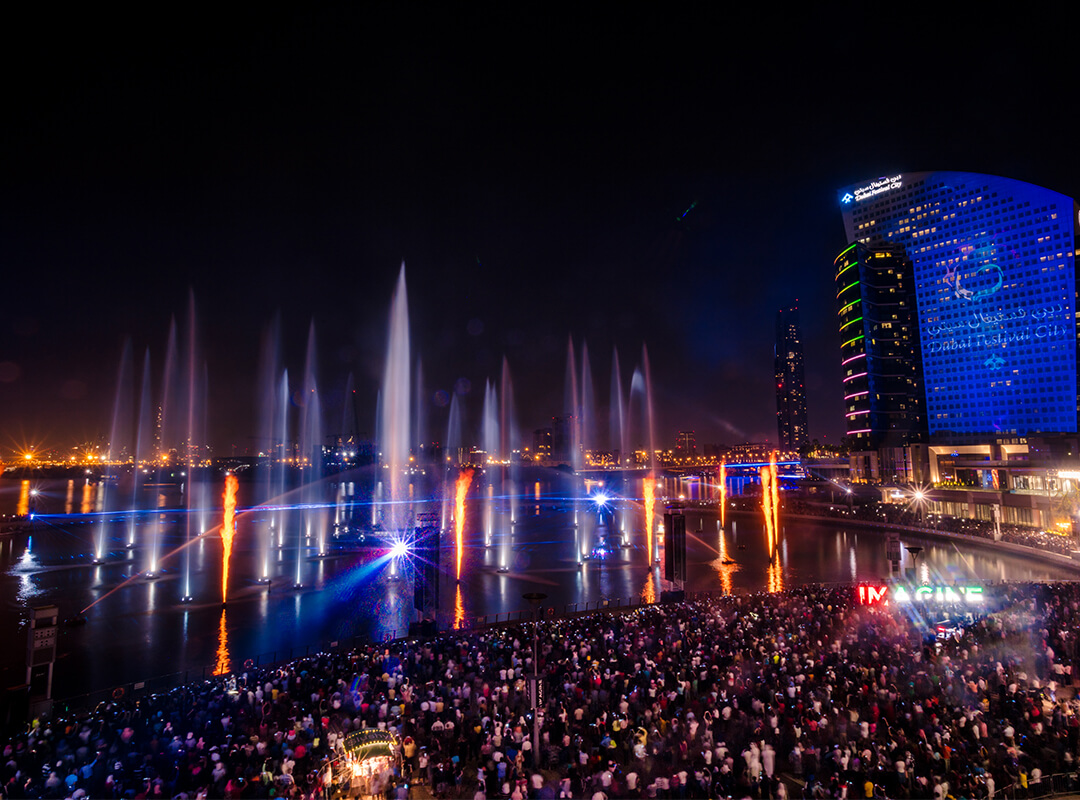
The Intercontinental Hotel is to the right

The front hotel facade is lit with coloured animated LED lighting at night. An evening laser light show with computer-controlled fountains in the former marina next to the hotel and mall includes projections onto the side facade of the hotel.

An abra ferry service runs across the Dubai Creek during the day from outside the hotel to Al Jaddaf Marine Transport Station, linked to Creek metro station on the Green Line of the Dubai Metro.
