= Al Nassma Chocolate =

Emirati camel milk chocolate manufacturer

Al Nassma Chocolate LLC
- Industry: Chocolate
- Founded: 22 October 2008; 18 years ago in Dubai
- Headquarters: Dubai, United Arab Emirates
- Key people: Martin van Almsick (general manager)
- Products: Chocolates and confectionery
- Website: www.al-nassma.com

Al Nassma Chocolate LLC is an Emirati manufacturer and retailer of camel milk chocolates. Founded in Dubai in 2008, the company retails its products in Dubai and in Europe, Hong Kong, and Malaysia.

== History ==
Al Nassma Chocolate is the United Arab Emirates' first and only camel milk chocolate brand, founded on 22 October 2008. The development and launch of the brand took almost four years.

== Products ==
The company's products include 70g camel milk chocolate bars in several flavors: whole milk, nuts and cocoa 70% (dark), Arabia (with a mix of Arabian spices such as cardamom and cinnamon), macadamia orange and dates; camel-shaped chocolates, Camel Caravan, with macadamia nut and honey cream filling; hollow camel figures; and various kinds of pralines.

Arab cuisine traditionally includes camel milk in various forms.

Its 70g chocolate bars are wrapped in double printed gold foil; while pralines are packaged in boxes resembling camel hide. Wooden boxes sourced from Holzmanufaktur Liebich in Germany are used for Camel Caravan, and the camel figures are wrapped in golden foil, and packed in gift boxes.

== Production process ==
Al Nassma manufactures its own chocolates from cocoa beans. In 2006, the company set up a Halal-certified production facility. The milk from which the chocolates are produced comes from camels at the Camelicious Farm in Umm Nahad. The farm belongs to the Emirates Industry for Camel Milk & Products (EICMP). The farm houses over 3,500 camels. The camels are milked twice daily, yielding around 5,000 litres of raw camel milk, which is pasteurised in an ISO 22000 certified dairy plant. A portion of the milk is bottled for sale under the Camelicious label. The remaining is freeze-dried and airlifted to be sent to a factory in Austria where the chocolate mass is manufactured in a chocolate mass factory.

Al Nassr makes use of around 150 ml of fresh and pasteurised camel milk in one bar of whole milk chocolate. All ingredients – including camel milk, sugar, cocoa beans, cocoa paste, cocoa butter, bourbon vanilla, honey, Arabian spices, pistachios, dates, macadamia nuts and orange zest have no artificial colour or additives.

The molding of most products as well as most of the packaging is done at the company's headquarters in Dubai, UAE.

== Spread & reach ==
Since its inception in 2008, Al Nassma has sold its camel milk chocolate mainly through camel-shaped kiosks. There is also an Al Nassma branded shop at the Camelicious camel farm in the desert.

There are sales kiosks at The Dubai Mall, including 'At the Top', Burj Khalifa, the Burj Al Arab, Souk Madinat Jumeirah, Jumeirah Hotels & Resorts, Bab Al Shams Hotel, Emirates Towers Hotel, Atlantis, The Palm, Kempinski, Grand Hyatt and Anantara Hotels & Resorts. It is sold in duty-free outlets in the Persian Gulf region, including Dubai Duty Free, Qatar Duty Free.

In 2009 Al Nassma started exporting its camel milk chocolates via UPS to Japan, Hong Kong, Malaysia and the US, Germany, Switzerland, Austria, Czech Republic, France and the UK.

The products are sold in retail locations within UAE shopping malls, hotels and resorts and in duty frees in several countries. They are also sold at Julius Meinl am Graben in Vienna and Prague since 2013, and at Selfridges in London since early 2014, and KaDeWe in Berlin.

In June 2014, Al Nassma and Gebr. Heinemann opened duty-free sales in Vienna Duty Free and Istanbul Duty Free, and on cruise liners of MSC Cruises.

== Bibliography ==
- Hermann, Rainer (1 October 2011). Die Golfstaaten: Wohin geht das neue Arabien? (in German). ISBN 978-3-423-40840-0.
- Low, Linda (16 July 2012). Abu Dhabi's Vision 2030: An Ongoing Journey of Economic Development. World Scientific. p. 35. doi:10.1142/8379. ISBN 9789814383936.
- Prinz, Deborah (2013). On the Chocolate Trail: A Delicious Adventure Connecting Jews, Religions, History, Travel, Rituals and Recipes to the Magic of Cacao. Jewish Lights Publishing. p. 156. ISBN 9781580234870.
- Camel Milk - New Observations. U. Wernery. Central Veterinary Labs, Dubai, UAE.
- Emiko Furuya- 世界の恵美子古谷チョコレート. Chocolate in the World. 14 Januar 2010; Page 4
- Proceedings of International Camel Conference, Feb. 16/17, 2007. pp. 200–204.
- Rurubu Resort Dubai-るるぶドバイ. September 2012; Page 33
