= Dubai Outlet Mall =

- Location: Umm Nahad First, Dubai, United Arab Emirates
- Coordinates: 25°04′26.79″N 55°24′01.14″E
- Address: Al Ain Road, Route 66
- Opened: 22 August 2007; 19 years ago
- Manager: Dubai Outlet Mall
- Num. of stores: 240
- Floor area: 69,977 m^{2} (753,230 sq ft)
- Floors: Ground floor & First floor
- Parking: 4000
- Website: dubaioutletmall.com

Dubai Outlet Mall (DOM) is a shopping mall in Umm Nahad First, Dubailand, Dubai, the UAE. Opened in 2007 and is located on the Dubai-Al Ain Road (Route 66) near the Dubai Bypass Road interchange. The shopping mall has a total size of 102,193 m^{2} (1,100,000 sq ft) and a total gross leasable area of 69,977 m^{2} (753,230 sq ft) and it currently features 240 retail outlets with over 1,200 brands.

== Shopping ==
The mall houses over 1,200 brands that include Burberry, Adidas, Coach, Fred Perry, Mango and Aldo. The new expansion of the mall included lots of brands like Rivoli Group, Gallery One, Mumuso, Zippy Kids, OVS Kids, Simple Kitchen, Dwell, Supercare, Optivision, Optics for Less, Sensoline, Via Milano, Ricci Ceremony, Lens Kart, Notino Gallery, Intimate Collection, Mario Barutti, Tiyabi Taif Al Emarat, Selz, and Duozoulo, and many more.

== Entertainment ==
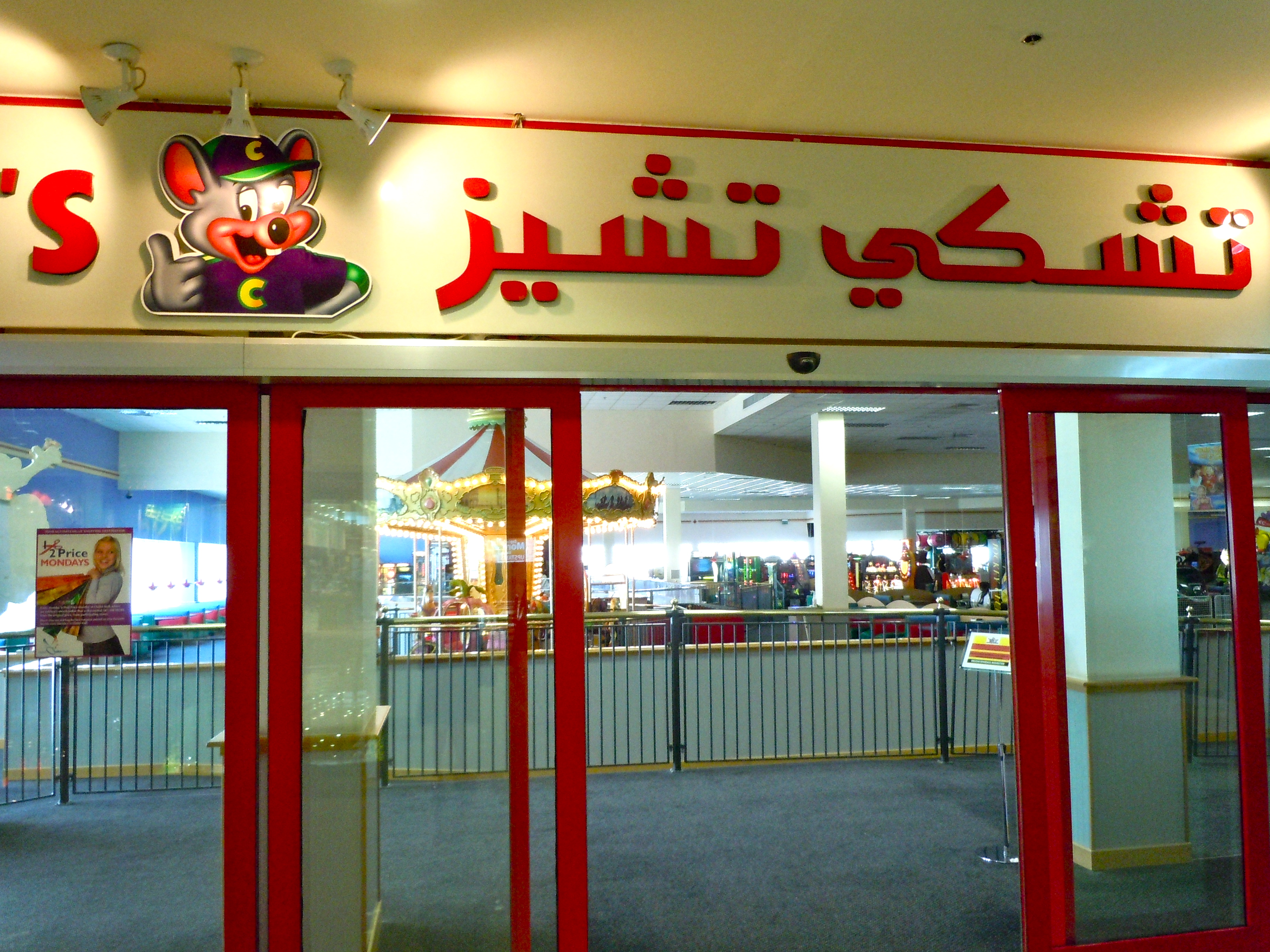
Chuck E Cheese in the Dubai Outlet Mall

The mall used to host Chuck E. Cheese's, a family entertainment venue, however it has been closed since mid-2024.

== Milestones ==
- August 2007 - Dubai Outlet Mall opens
- August 2017 - Dubai Outlet Mall 10th Year Anniversary
- February 2018 - mall announces funding for expansion to increase facilities for shopping, dining, and parking

== See also ==
- Dubai Outlet City
- Developments in Dubai
- List of development projects in Dubai
