= Dubai Festival City Mall =

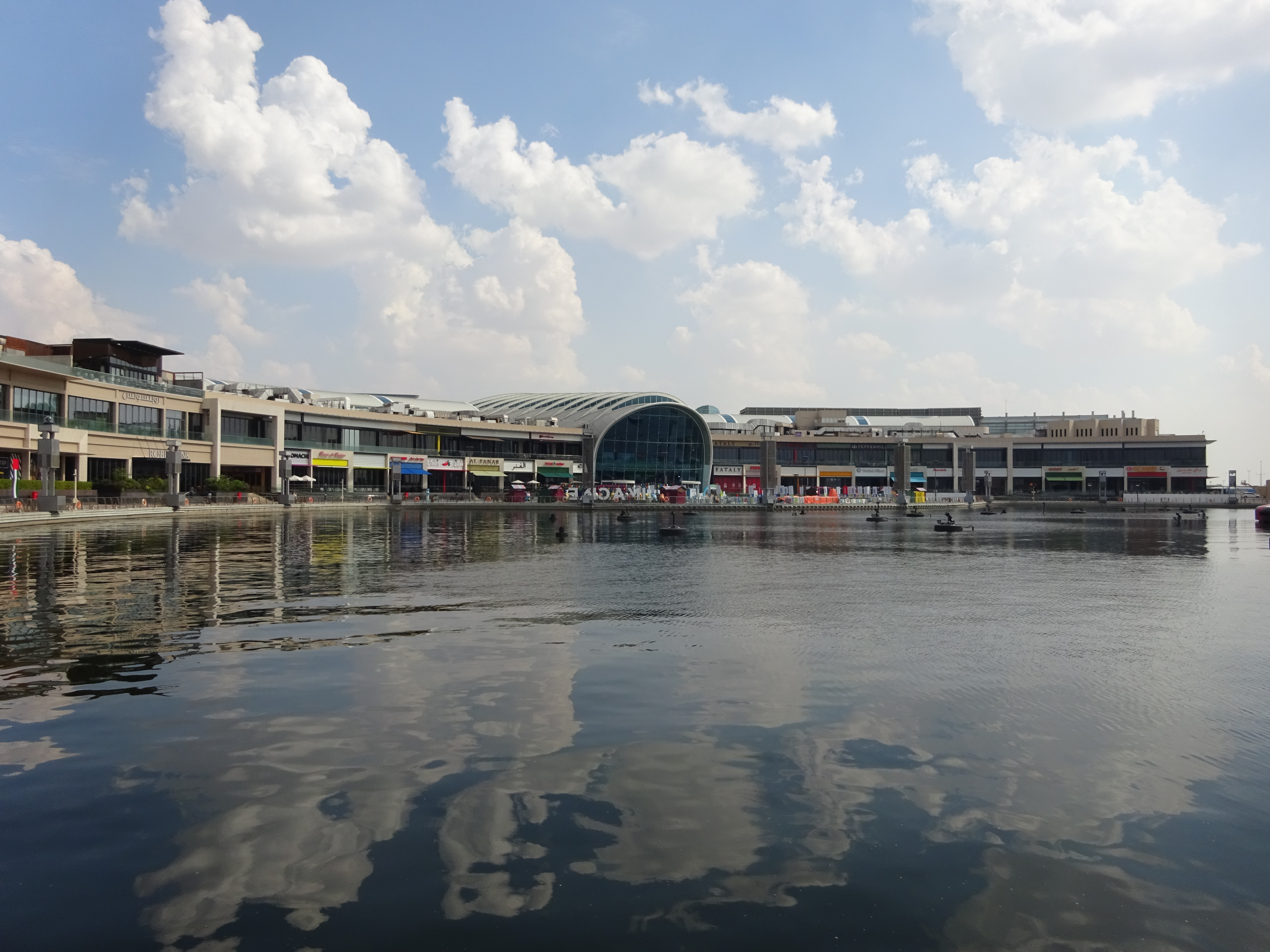
- View of the mall from the waterfront
- Location: Dubai, United Arab Emirates
- Coordinates: 25°13′17″N 55°21′01″E
- Address: Dubai Festival City
- Opened: January 22, 2007; 19 years ago
- Manager: Hayssam Hajar – Director of Asset Management UAE, Al-Futtaim Real Estate; Himanshu Shrivastava – Chief Technology & Data Officer (CTO/CIO/CDO), Group Technology & Digital Platforms, Al-Futtaim
- Owner: Al-Futtaim Real Estate
- Floors: 3
- Public transit: Al Jaddaf Marine Station
- Website: dubaifestivalcitymall.com

Dubai Festival City Mall is a regional retail and entertainment center in Dubai, United Arab Emirates.

The mall spans approximately 232,507 m² (2.4 million ft²) of leasable space and hosts over 400 retail stores, restaurants, and entertainment venues. Anchor tenants include the Middle East's largest IKEA store, two major hypermarkets Carrefour and LuLu, Mark & Spencer, Ace Hardware, and VOX Cinemas. Situated along Dubai Creek, it features Festival Bay, a waterfront promenade known for "IMAGINE," a nightly multimedia fountain and laser show that holds two Guinness World Records.

As of 2024, it had a Gross Leasable Area (GLA) occupancy rate of 95 percent, with a footfall of 23 million visitors.

== Location ==
Dubai Festival City Mall is located in Dubai Festival City, on Dubai Creek in Dubai, United Arab Emirates (UAE). Attached to the mall are an InterContinental hotel (the InterContinental Dubai Festival City), a Crowne Plaza hotel, and a Holiday Inn hotel. The mall is close to Dubai International Airport. On the opposite bank of the Dubai Creek is the Mohammed Bin Rashid Library.

== History ==
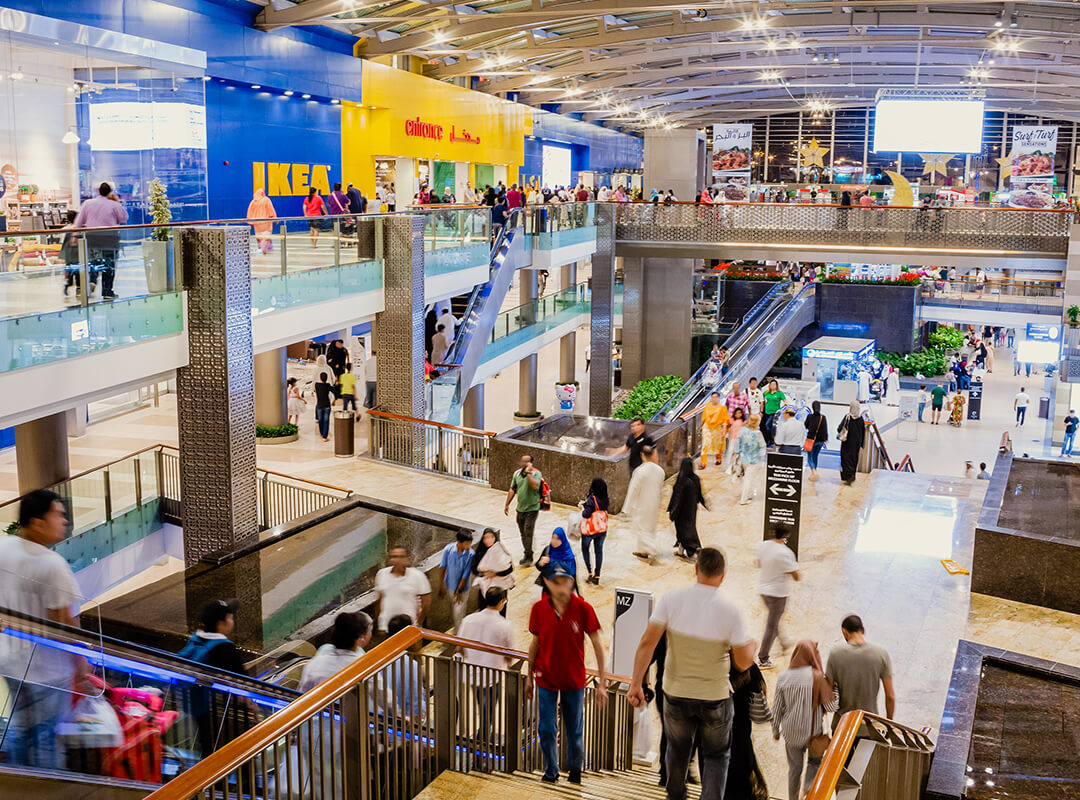
Dubai Festival City Mall

The concept for Dubai Festival City emerged in the early 2000s as a comprehensive "city-within-a-city" project. The first phase of the retail component saw the opening of the Middle East's largest IKEA in November 2005. The Dubai Festival City Mall officially launched on January 22, 2007.

In 2014, Al-Futtaim announced a redevelopment project and invested between AED 1.2 to 1.5 billion. Completed in phases between 2015 and 2017, the expansion added Festival Square, waterfront restaurants, and an entertainment complex. It also introduced "IMAGINE," a multimedia fountain display, in December 2016. In March 2017, the Robinsons Department Store from Singapore opened as part of the expanded retail offering.

In 2018, the mall added a charging point for Tesla electric cars in the basement.

In 2023, the mall introduced "Market Island," the largest food hall in the Middle East. Spanning 70,000 square feet, the venue features over 50 food concepts and includes the first licensed bar within a UAE shopping mall.

In 2024, Dubai Festival City Mall hosted the Waterbomb Festival, an event combining live musical performances with water-based activities.

== Facilities ==
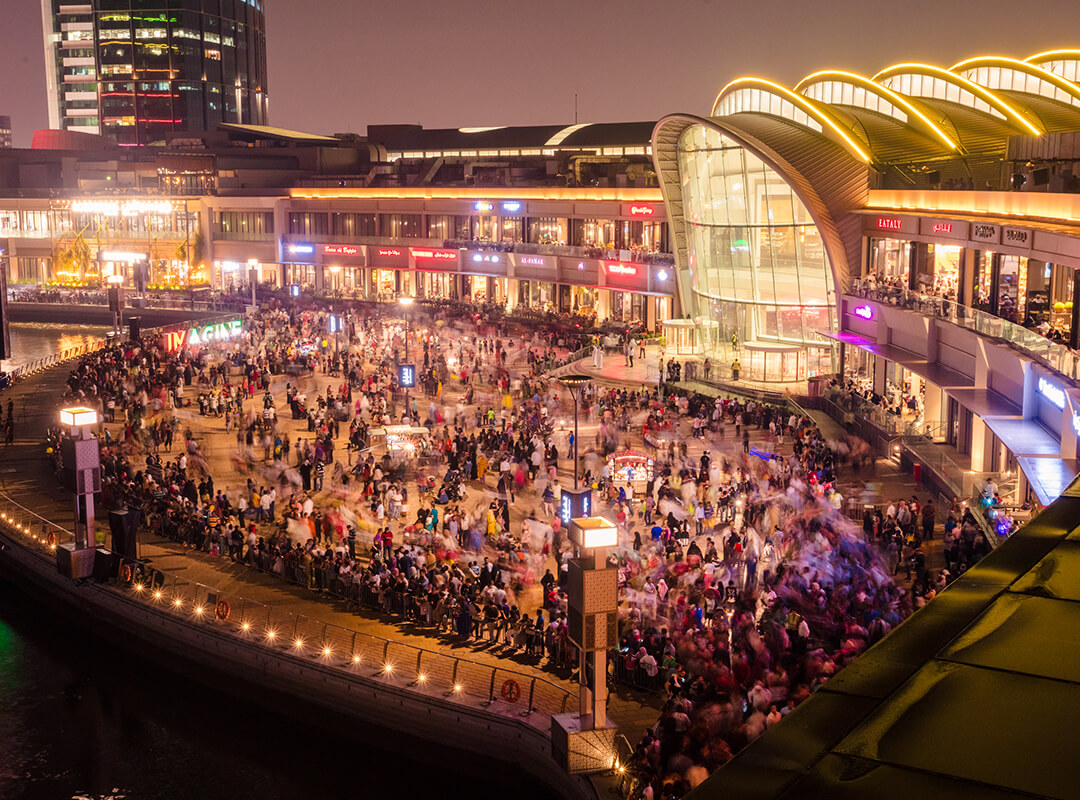
Nightttime view on the waterfront

Dubai Festival City Mall is a shopping, dining, and entertainment complex situated within Dubai Festival City, UAE. Owned and operated by the Al-Futtaim Group, the three-level mall contains over 400 retail outlets. The mall is anchored by several major retailers, including IKEA, Lulu Hypermarket, Marks & Spencer, and Ace Hardware. It also features entertainment venues such as Leo & Loona, Ground Control, and Hello Park. Al-Futtaim's retail division introduced several international fashion and lifestyle brands to Dubai, including JIJIL, Pull & Bear, Lichi, Mint Velvet, Sugar Factory, and Letoile.

The mall features restaurants and cafés concentrated around Festival Bay, operates the Middle East's largest food hall, Market Island, and Dubai’s first licensed mall-based bar. Festival Bay hosts "IMAGINE," a nightly multimedia fountain, light, and pyrotechnics show holding Guinness World Records for largest water screen projection and largest permanent projection mapping surface.

In mid-2024, Dubai Festival City Mall expanded its offerings with the June opening of EL&N London, a café brand recognized for its distinct pink floral interior design. The following year brought several additions. On April 11, 2025, the mall launched Korea 360, a permanent Hallyu culture and retail hub on the first floor. Supported by South Korea’s Ministry of Culture, Sports and Tourism and the Korea Creative Content Agency, its official opening followed a pilot phase earlier in the year. In May 2025, the international hot‑pot restaurant chain Haidilao opened a branch featuring its interactive dining service. Later that month, on May 23, a temporary multimedia attraction chronicling the career of Lionel Messi was introduced. The nine‑zone, approximately 2,500 m² exhibit, produced in partnership with the Dubai Festivals and Retail Establishment (DFRE), is scheduled to run through December 31, 2025.

== See also ==
- List of shopping malls in Dubai
