= Dubai Festival City =

Mixed-use development in Dubai, United Arab Emirates

Dubai Festival City دبي فستيفال سيتي
- Mixed-use development
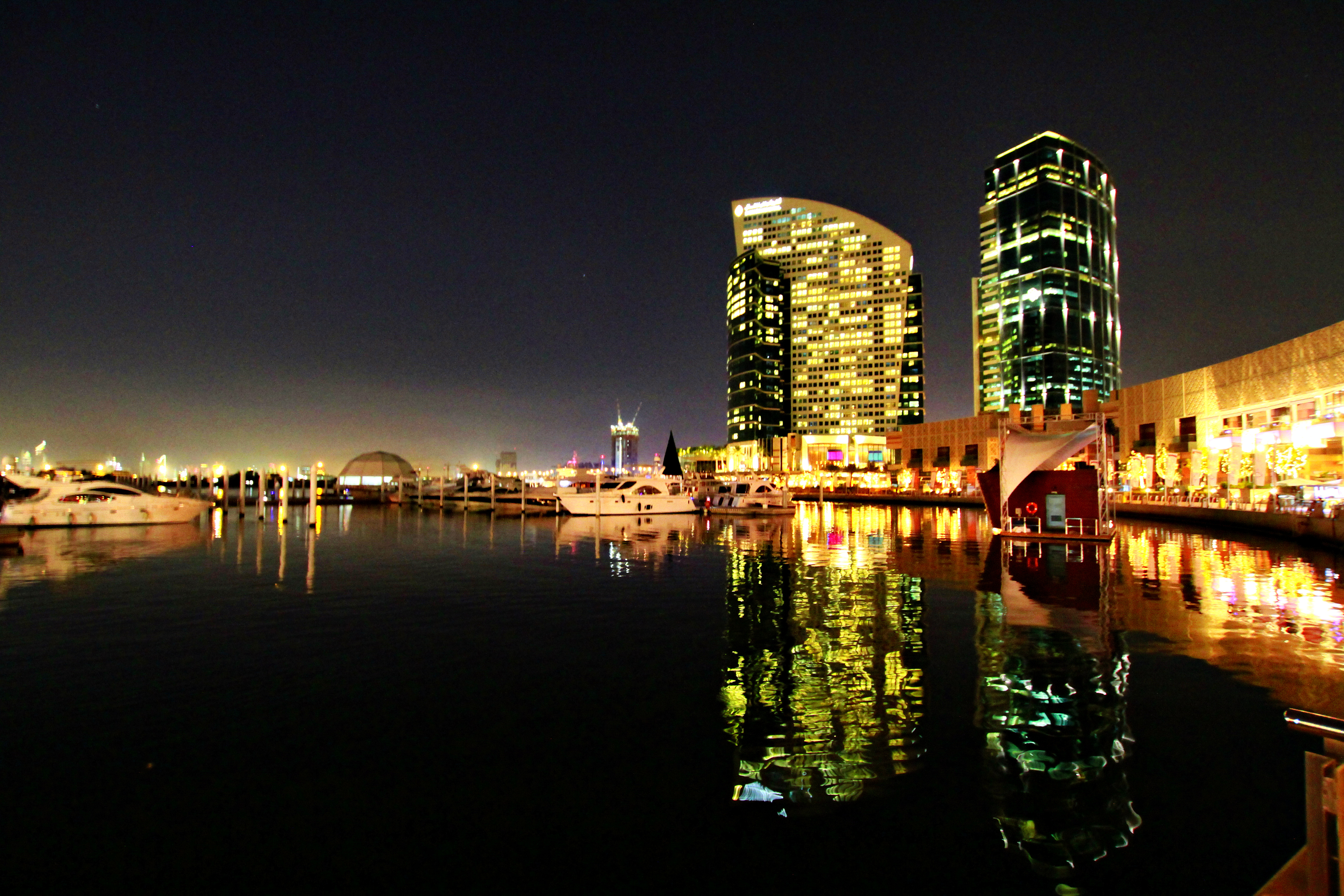
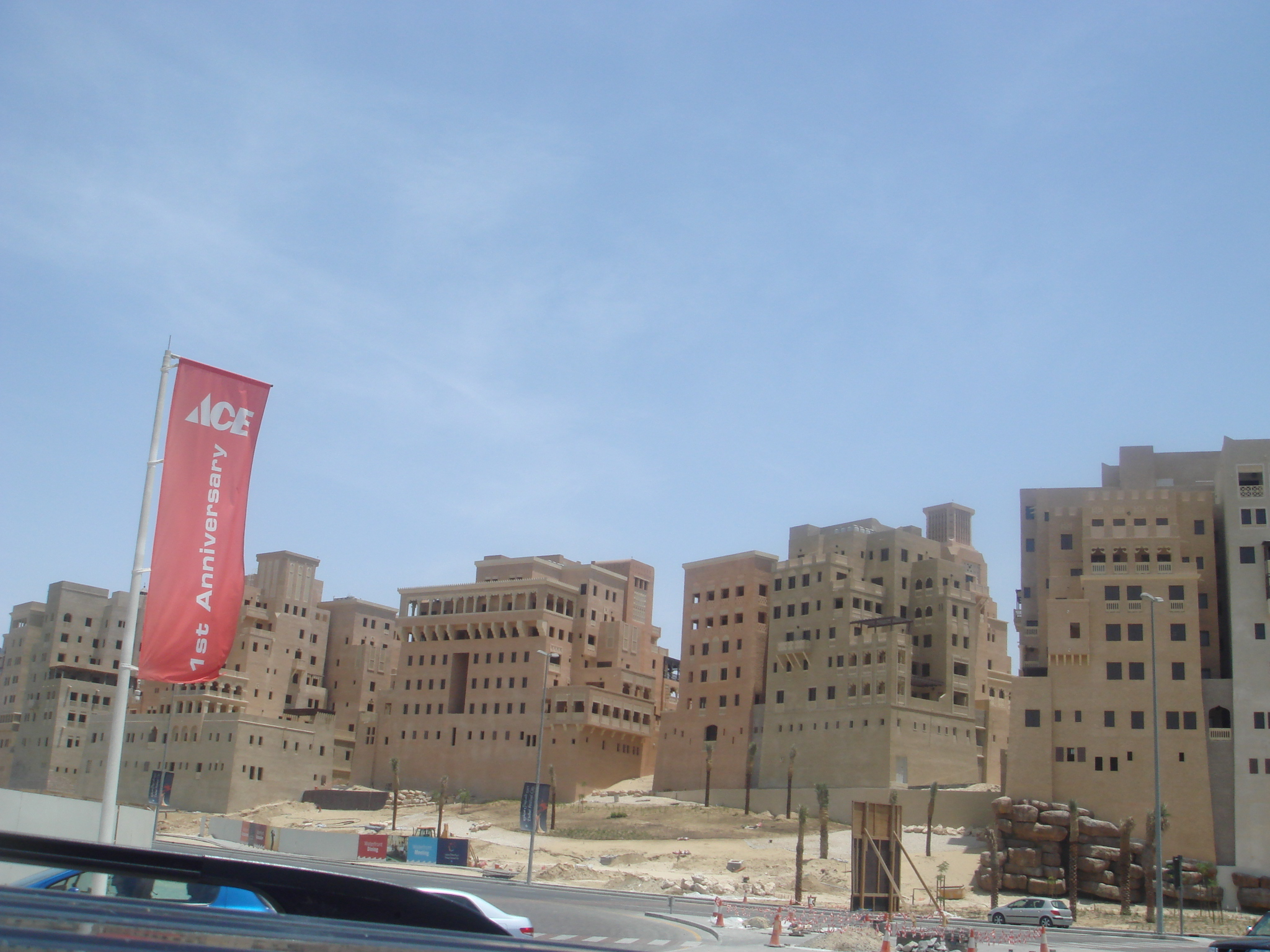
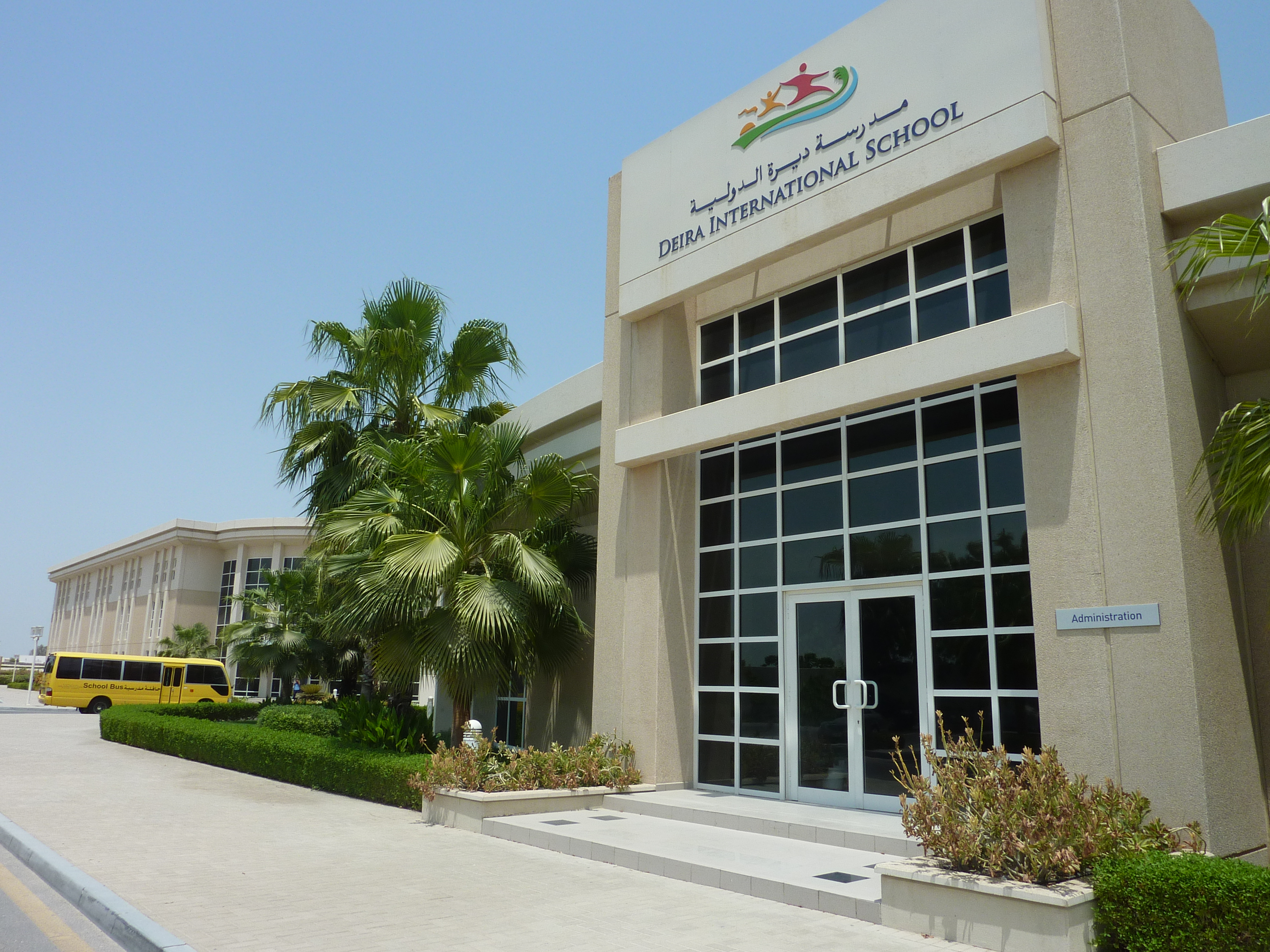
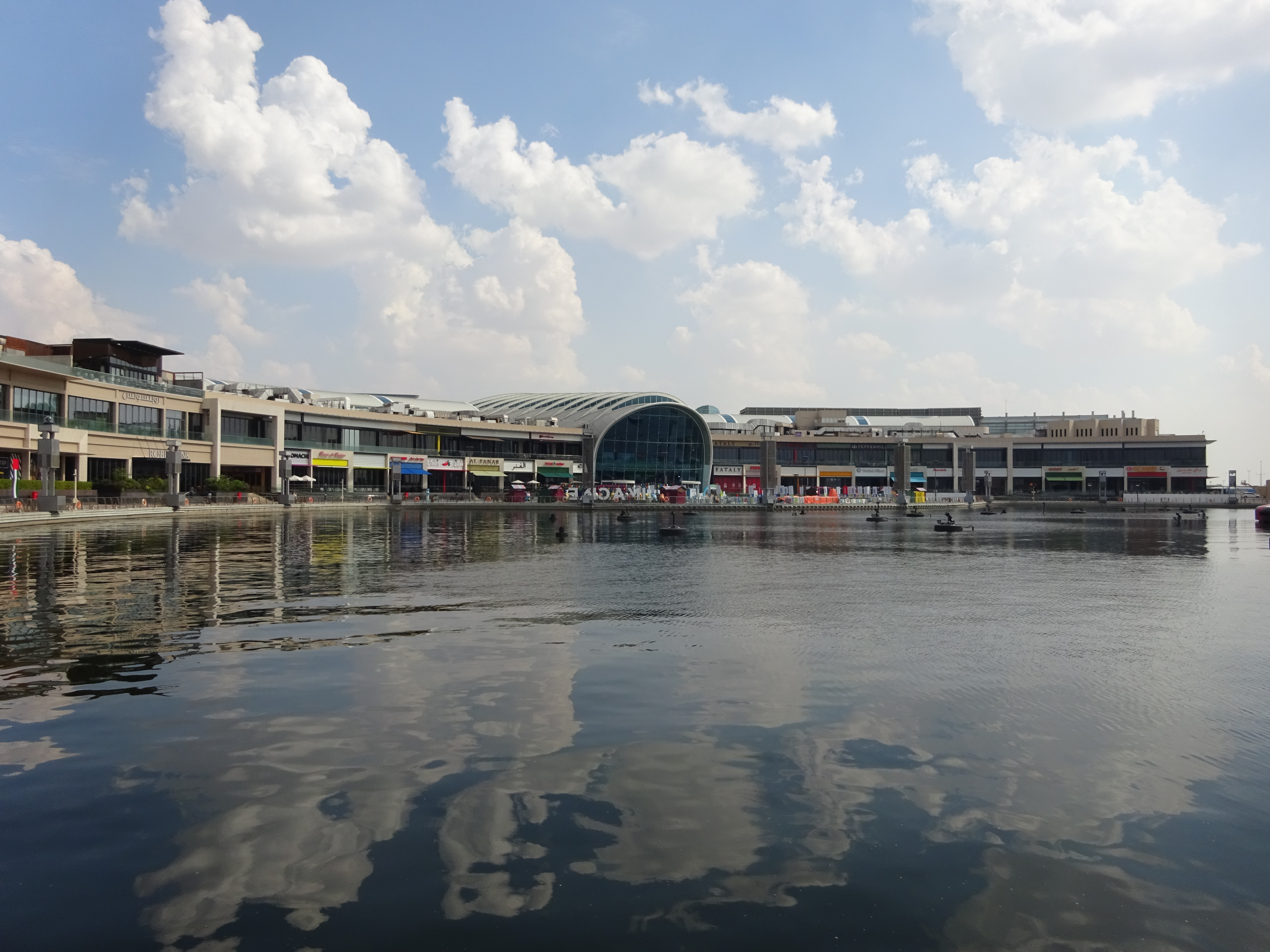
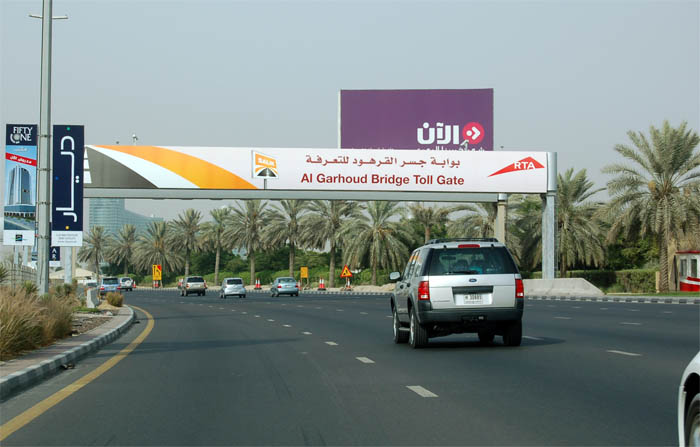
- Clockwise from top: Skyline at night, Deira International School, Dubai Festival City Mall viewed from Dubai Creek, Al Garhoud Bridge, InterContinental Hotel, Al Kheeran residential properties

- Interactive map of Dubai Festival City
- Location within Dubai Location within United Arab Emirates
- Coordinates: 25°13′18.1″N 55°21′9.0″E
- Country: United Arab Emirates
- Emirate: Emirate of Dubai
- City: Dubai
- Inception: 2003

Area
  - Total: 526 ha (1,300 acres)

Population
  - Total: 77,000
- Time zone: UTC+4 (UAE)
- Website: dubaifestivalcity.com

Dubai Festival City (DFC) (Arabic: دبي فستيفال سيتي), also known as Al Kheeran, is a large-scale mixed-use waterfront development on the eastern bank of Dubai Creek. Developed by Al-Futtaim Real Estate, the project spans 5.2 million square metres and functions as a self-contained "city-within-a-city."

It has residential and commercial properties, including Marsa Plaza, Al Badia Residences, Al Badia Hillside, Al Badia Living, the Dubai Festival City Mall with over 400 outlets, an IHG hotel complex with over 1,600 rooms, a marina, and a golf course. Other features include the IMAGINE light and water show, the BOUNCE-X Freestyle Terrain Park, Market Island, and a 3.3 km waterfront promenade. Located two kilometres from Dubai International Airport, it is one of the largest privately developed projects in the Middle East.

== History ==
=== Conception and initial phases (2003–2007) ===
Dubai Festival City was announced in the early 2000s, and construction began in 2003, with Al-Futtaim Carillion as the main contractor. The first phase opened in late 2005 with the Festival Power Centre, featuring the UAE's largest IKEA store.

In March 2007, the Festival Waterfront Centre, the main retail and entertainment complex, was officially opened. It included cinemas, bowling alleys, and food courts.

=== Hotel openings (2007–2009) ===
In the latter part of the 2000s, InterContinental Hotels Group launched a hotel cluster that included the InterContinental Dubai Festival City, Crowne Plaza Dubai Festival City, and InterContinental Residence Suites.

=== Refurbishment and later developments (2010–present) ===
In 2015, Al-Futtaim invested AED 1.5 billion into an expansion and refurbishment of Dubai Festival City Mall. A key part of this expansion was the launch of the IMAGINE show at Festival Bay in December 2016.

The mall's new wing opened in 2017, anchored by Robinsons department store, which closed in 2021.

== Education ==
Several schools are located in or near the development. Deira International School, situated within Dubai Festival City, offers a British and IB curriculum. Other nearby schools include Universal American School (American/IB curriculum), approximately 1 km from the mall; Al Mawakeb School Al Garhoud (American/French curriculum), 1.6 km away; and Grammar School (British curriculum), 2 km away.

== Residential and commercial projects ==
The first residential communities to launch were Marsa Plaza, Al Badia Residences, and Al Badia Hillside. Marsa Plaza has one- to four-bedroom apartments and duplexes. Al Badia Residences consists of apartments and townhouses located near the Al Areesh Club, while Al Badia Living is a development of 337 one- to four-bedroom apartments.

== Hotels ==
InterContinental Hotels Group operates a cluster of hotels in Dubai Festival City that include the InterContinental Dubai Festival City, Crowne Plaza Dubai Festival City, and InterContinental Residence Suites.

== Retail ==
=== Dubai Festival City Mall ===
Dubai Festival City Mall is a shopping mall in Dubai with over 400 retail outlets, including the first IKEA in the United Arab Emirates. The mall features a Guinness World Record-holding water and light show called IMAGINE, and an event space, Festival Bay, which overlooks Dubai Creek. It has a gross leasing area of 230,000 square metres. Festival Arena is another project covering a 7,200-square-metre event space with a 17.5-metre ceiling height.

=== Marsa Boulevard ===
Marsa Boulevard is a retail and dining area located along Dubai Creek. It occupies 18,000 square metres and contains food and beverage outlets, boutique stores, and retail spaces for modular fashion concepts.
