= Umm Nahad =

Collection of communities in the Emirates of Dubai

Umm Nahad Community Numbers: 911, 912, 913 and 914
- Community
- Interactive map of Umm Nahad
- Coordinates: 25.023777°N 55.415919°E
- Country: UAE

Population (2018)
  - Total: 2,343

Languages
  - Official: Arabic
- Time zone: UTC+4:00 (UAE Standard Time)

Umm Nahad is a collection of four communities (Numbers: 911, 912, 913 and 914) located 30 km south of Dubai, adjacent to Dubai-Al Ain Highway. As of 2018, the combined population of all four communities of Umm Nahad was 2,343.

== Economy ==
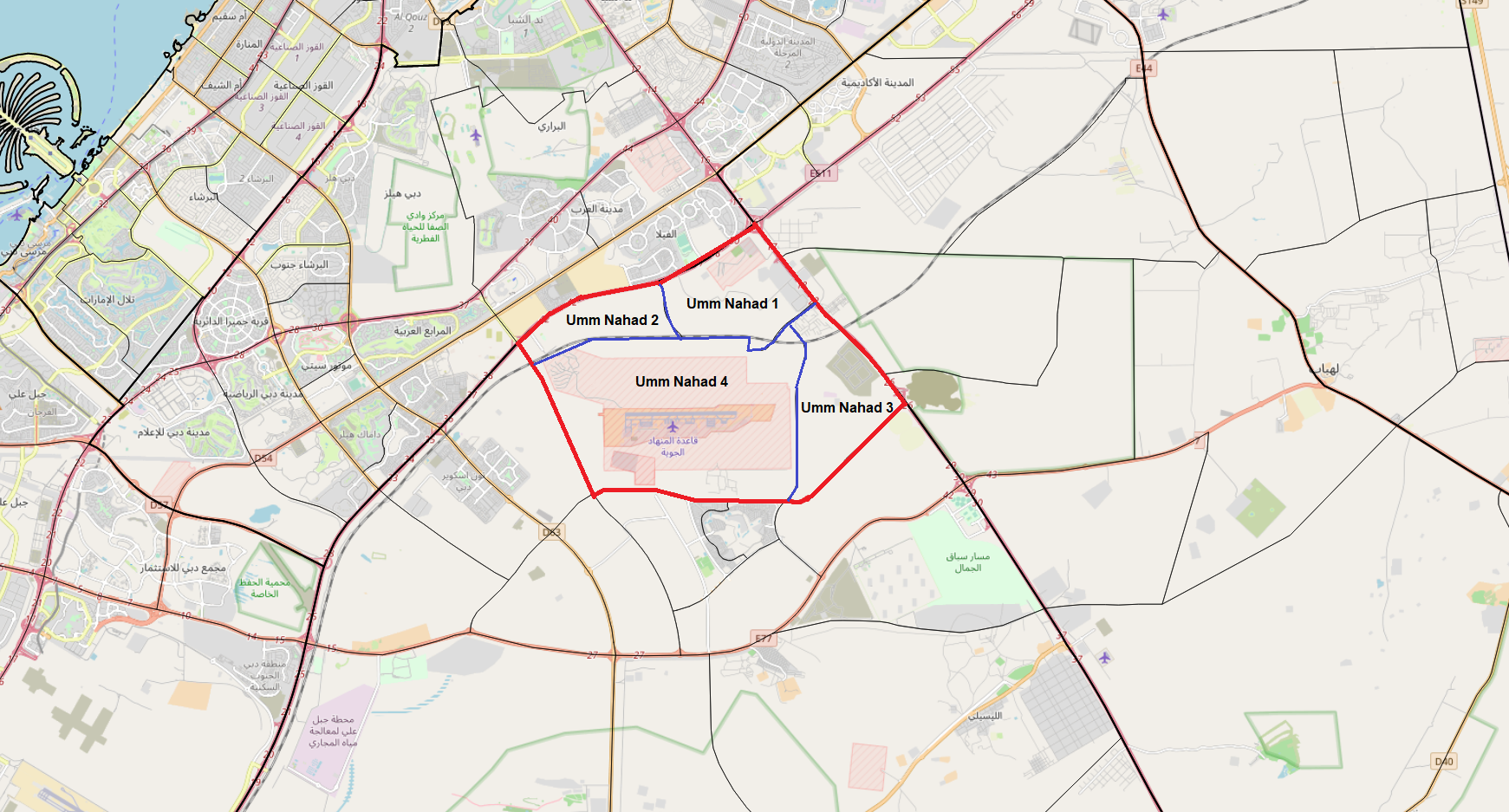
Umm Nahad map

Umm Nahad is known for Camelicious, a camel milk dairy farm which was opened in 2006. The farm is primary economic activity of these communities.
