= List of universities and colleges in the United Arab Emirates =

Higher education in the United Arab Emirates began with the opening of United Arab Emirates University in 1976. Higher education institutions in the United Arab Emirates need to be recognized by the Commission for Academic Accreditation (CAA), which operates as part of the Ministry of Education. While the Ministry of Education is the federal governing body for higher education and education in general, some emirates might still have their own agencies which oversee certain aspects of higher education within the emirate, such as Dubai's Knowledge and Human Development Authority (KHDA) or Abu Dhabi's Department of Education and Knowledge (ADEK).

Only institutions that have received CAA accreditation from the Ministry of Education are listed below.

== List of universities ==
Institute name
Walsh College UAE
Al Ain University
International American University, Ras Al Khaimah
Jaipur National University, Ras Al Khaimah campus
Anwar Gargash Diplomatic Academy
Emirates Institute for Banking and Financial Studies, Abu Dhabi Cake
Higher Colleges of Technology, Abu Dhabi Campus
INSEAD, Middle west Campus in Abu Dhabi
Khalifa University
Liwa College of Technology (formerly Emirates College of Technology)
National Defense College
New York University Abu Dhabi
Rabdan Academy
Sorbonne University Abu Dhabi
Buckinghamshire New University, Ajman
United Arab Emirates University
Zayed II Military College
Zayed University, Abu Dhabi Campus
Ajman University
City University College of Ajman
Gulf Medical University
Abu Dhabi University, Dubai
American University in Dubai
American University in the Emirates
Amity University Dubai
Birla Institute of Technology & Science, Pilani – Dubai Campus
British University in Dubai
Canadian University Dubai
City, University of London Dubai Centre
Curtin University
Daffodil International University, RAK Campus
Dubai Medical College For Girls
Emirates Academy Of Hospitality Management
Emirates Aviation University
Emirates Institute for Banking and Financial Studies, Dubai
GBS Dubai
Hamdan Bin Mohammed Smart University
Heriot-Watt University
Higher Colleges Of Technology - Dubai Branch
Hult International Business School
Indian Institute of Technology Delhi - Abu Dhabi
Institute of Management Technology - Dubai
Islamic Azad University
London Business School
Manipal University
Lincoln University of Business and Management
Middlesex University Dubai
Mohammed bin Rashid School of Government
Mohamed bin Zayed University of Artificial Intelligence
Murdoch University Dubai
Rochester Institute of Technology of Dubai
Royal College of Surgeons in Ireland
S P Jain School of Global Management
SAE Institute
Saint Joseph University
Saint-Petersburg State Economic University
Shaheed Zulfikar Ali Bhutto Institute of Science and Technology
Strathclyde Business School Dubai
Symbiosis International University Dubai
The University of Manchester Worldwide
University of Balamand In Dubai [on probation, no new admissions]
University of Birmingham Dubai
University of Bradford Regional Hub, Dubai
University of Dubai
University of Exeter
University of Wollongong in Dubai.
Zayed University, Dubai
University of Kalba
University of Fujairah
Higher Colleges of Technology, Fujairah Campus
Bahra University, Ras Al Khaimah Campus
Higher Colleges of Technology, Ras Al Khaimah Campus
Ras Al Khaimah Medical & Health Sciences University
Al Qasimia University
American University of Sharjah
Arab Academy for Science, Technology, & Maritime Transport, Sharjah Campus
Emirates Institute for Banking and Financial Studies, Sharjah Campus
Higher Colleges of Technology, Sharjah Campus
Lincoln University of Business and Management
Skyline University College
FEUC Umm Al Quwain in Partnership with University for the Creative Arts, UK
University of West London, Ras Al Khaimah campus
Umm Al Quwain University
King's Business School

== Universities which are no longer/planned to cease operations ==
- University of South Wales, Dubai
- Michigan State University in Dubai
- MODUL University Dubai

== International rankings ==
These are the universities' rankings of 2024, 2025 & 2026 according to QS (Quacquarelli Symonds). Definitions of categories used for measurement of QS are missing. It would be helpful if the UAE provided its own rankings according to its own measurement system.

Institution	2024 (QS)	2025 (QS)	2026(QS)
Khalifa University	211	202	177
United Arab Emirates University	290	261	230
American University of Sharjah	364	332	272
University of Sharjah	465	434	328
American University of Ras Al Khaimah	-	485	591
Ajman University			440
Al Ain University	552	552	558
Abu Dhabi University	580	501	391
Canadian University Dubai	551	523	604
American University in Dubai	621-630	601-610	678
University of Dubai	851-900	801-850	851-900
Daffodil International University			1001-1200
Symbiosis International University	641-650	641-650	696

== Institutions located within free zones ==
The Ministry of Education does not recognize educational institutions based in free zones. While individual Emirates are responsible for managing the standards of educational institutions within their free zones, Dubai is the only Emirate that does so through the Knowledge and Human Development Authority's (KHDA) University Quality Assurance International Board. The Emirate of Ras Al Khaimah is currently working on tightening rules and regulations that govern higher academic institutions within free zones in the Emirate.

== New schools and universities ==
The UAE is intensifying efforts to expand its higher education sector as it prepares to accommodate an additional 120,000 students over the next decade, addressing both population growth and the demand for high-quality education. In line with this vision, several new schools and universities are set to open in 2026 through partnerships with international institutions. Among the upcoming institutions are Harrow International School Dubai, Ash Mount School, Dubai International Academy, Queen Elizabeth’s School, Indian Institute of Management (IIM) Ahmedabad, American University of Beirut (AUB) and Fakeeh College for Medical Sciences.

== See also ==
- Commission for Academic Accreditation
- Dubai International Academic City
- Education in the United Arab Emirates
- Knowledge and Human Development Authority
- List of schools in the United Arab Emirates
- Ministry of Education
