= Abu Dhabi University–Al Ain =

Satellite campus of Abu Dhabi University in Al Ain, United Arab Emirates

- جامعة أبوظبي – فرع العين
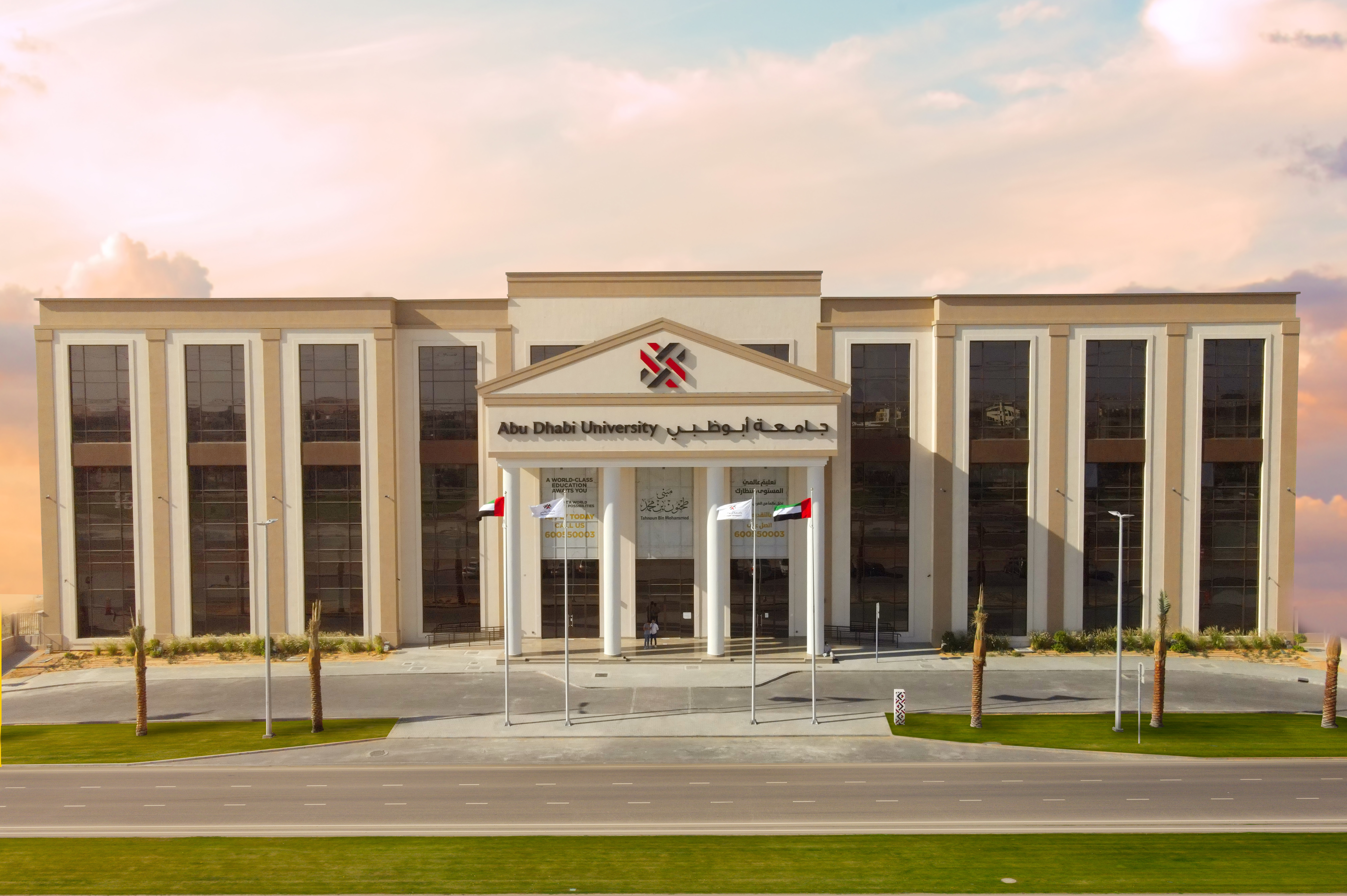
- Established: 21 September 2003; 22 years ago
- Founders: Ali Saeed al-Dhaheri
- Parent institution: Abu Dhabi University
- Accreditation: CAA
- Director: Dr. Hamad Odhabi
- Location: Al Ain, United Arab Emirates; 24°11′25″N 55°42′28″E
- Website: ADU Al Ain Campus
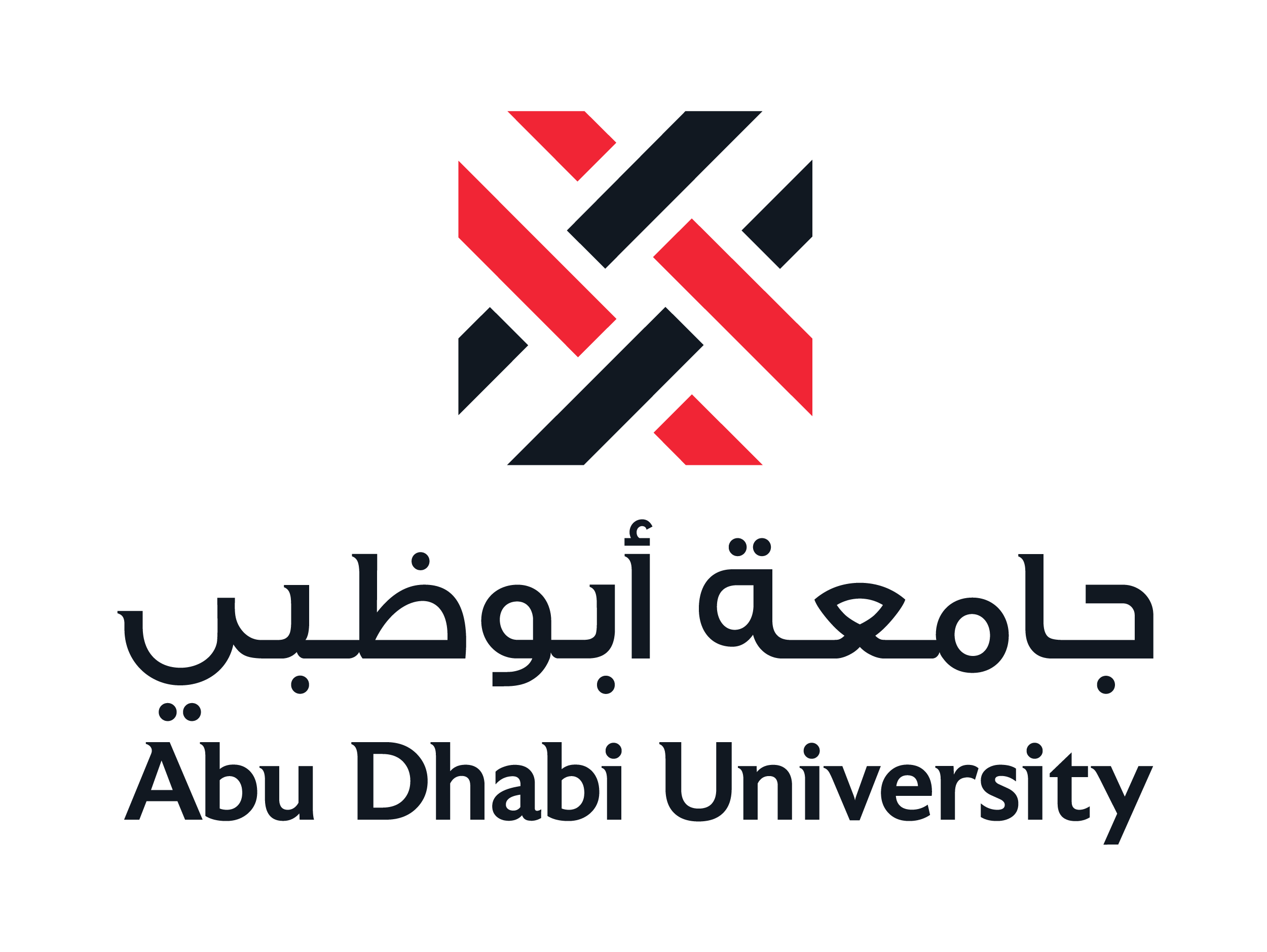

The Abu Dhabi University–Al Ain (ADU Al Ain) (Arabic: جامعة أبوظبي – فرع العين) is a branch campus of Abu Dhabi University in Asharej, Al Ain, United Arab Emirates. Established in 2003 simultaneously with the university's main campus in Abu Dhabi, it largely serves the members of UAE's armed forces and is one of the three satellite campuses of the university in the country.

== Overview ==
Abu Dhabi University's Al Ain branch was inaugurated in September 2003 simultaneously with the establishment of its main campus in Abu Dhabi. It enrolled around 400 pupils as inaugural students and was the only satellite campus of the university in the country until 2011 when the institute began planning to expand into the al-Dhafra region. In July 2018, WAM reported that Abu Dhabi University would be moving to a new campus from Falaj Hazzaa neighborhood to an $81 million campus in the Asharej neighborhood of Al Ain, that would be operational by September 2019. It's groundbreaking ceremony was conducted a month later in August 2018 and the campus was inaugurated in August 2020 instead of September 2019 whereas the old campus in Falaj Hazzaa was permanently closed down.
