= Manipal University =

Manipal University may refer to:

- Manipal Academy of Higher Education, formerly known as Manipal University, Manipal, Karnataka, India
  - Manipal Academy of Higher Education, Dubai, formerly known as Manipal University Dubai
- Manipal International University, Negeri Sembilan, Malaysia
- Sikkim Manipal University, Gangtok, Sikkim, India
