= Tanfeeth =

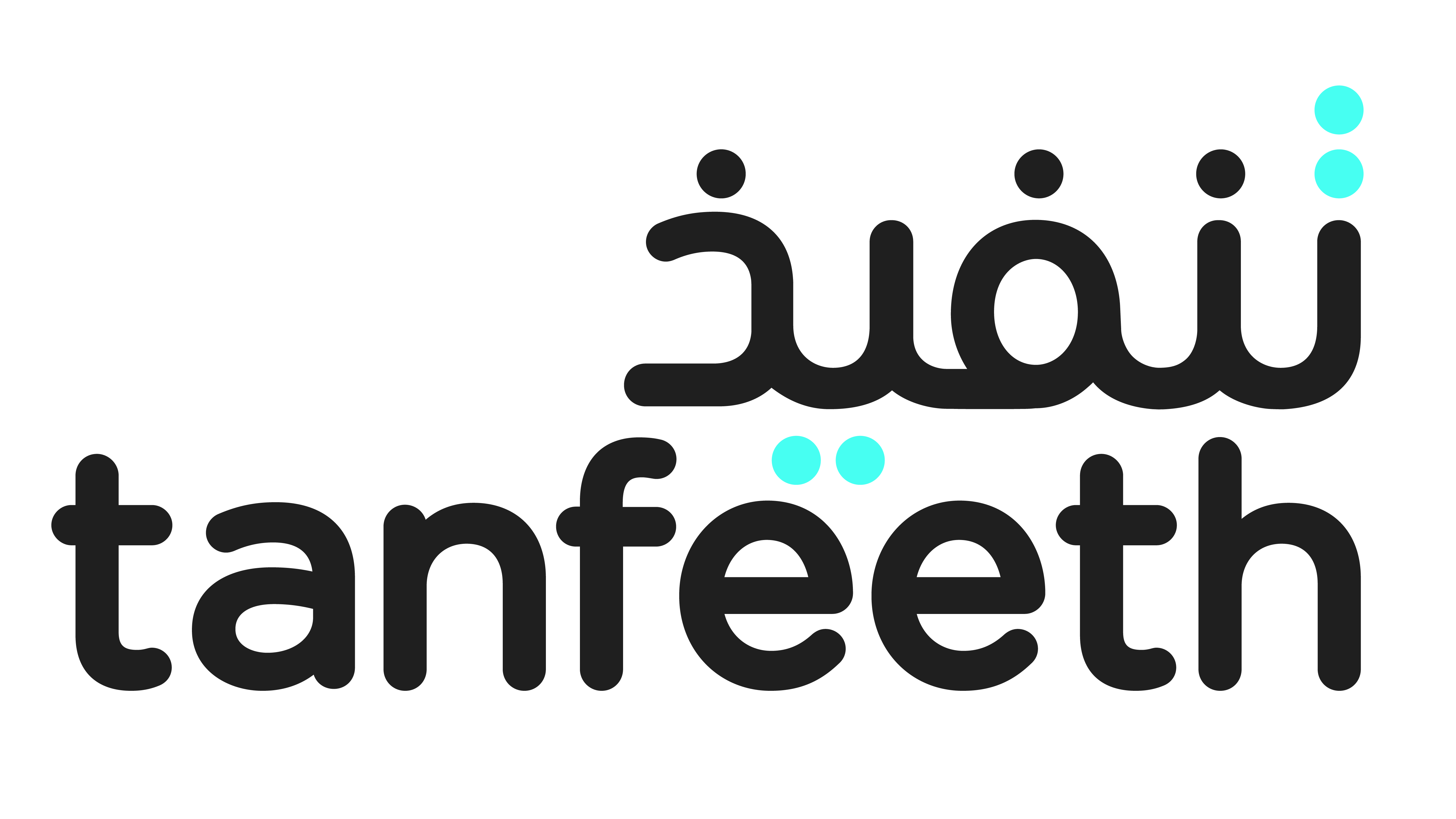
- Native name: تنفيذ
- Founded: Dubai, United Arab Emirates (November 2011)
- Key people: Maryam Bahlooq, CEO and Chairman, Abdulla Qassem
- Services: customer management, revenue generation, collections, human resource services, finance and accounting, banking and financial services, learning and development and business transformation
- Number of employees: 3200
- Parent: Emirates NBD
- Website: www.tanfeeth.ae

Tanfeeth is a shared business services company located in Dubai, United Arab Emirates. The company is a subsidiary of Emirates NBD. The company's name means "getting the job done" in Arabic.

Tanfeeth was founded in November 2011. As of October 2018, the company has approximately 3200 employees.

== History ==
In September 2011, Emirates NBD, the largest bank by assets in the United Arab Emirates, established Tanfeeth, a fully owned back-office subsidiary to improve its customer service and operational efficiency. At the time, Emirates NBD appointed Suhail Bin Tarraf as CEO of Tanfeeth, and the company had 700 employees located in Dubai, and Sharjah.

Tanfeeth absorbed all of Emirates NBD's back office operational teams between 2011 and 2013, and signed three additional client deals in 2013. The company began providing call center management services for a government authority, recruitment services for a telecommunications business, and transformation and advisory services for a banking institution in Kuwait.

In September 2013, Tanfeeth started offering specialized underwriting courses that were developed in collaboration with the Society for Human Resource Management with the intention of meeting skill shortage in the GCC's banking and insurance sectors. This formed part of Tanfeeth's learning and development platform that included more than fifty specialized skill training programs.

In June 2017, Emirates NBD announced the appointment of Maryam Bahlooq, who was part of the bank’s HR department for 17 years, as Chief Executive Officer of Tanfeeth. Abdulla Qassem serves as the company's Chairman.

In July 2021, Tanfeeth and the Emirates Institute for Banking and Financial Studies organized an Open Day for Emirati job seekers in the banking and finance sector.

In June 2022, Tanfeeth launched the 'Tatweer KSA' Transformation Program in collaboration with Emirates NBD KSA operations. The program aims to improve customer experience and operational efficiency across retail and banking segments in the kingdom.
