= Abu Dhabi University–Dubai =

Satellite campus of Abu Dhabi University in Dubai, United Arab Emirates

- جامعة أبوظبي – فرع دبي
- Established: 13 April 2017; 9 years ago
- Founder: Ali bin Harmal al-Dhaheri
- Parent institution: Abu Dhabi University
- Accreditation: CAA; KHDA
- Location: Dubai, United Arab Emirates; 25°6′16.4016″N 55°10′1.074″E
- Campus: 8,000 square metres (86,000 sq ft)
- Website: ADU Dubai Campus
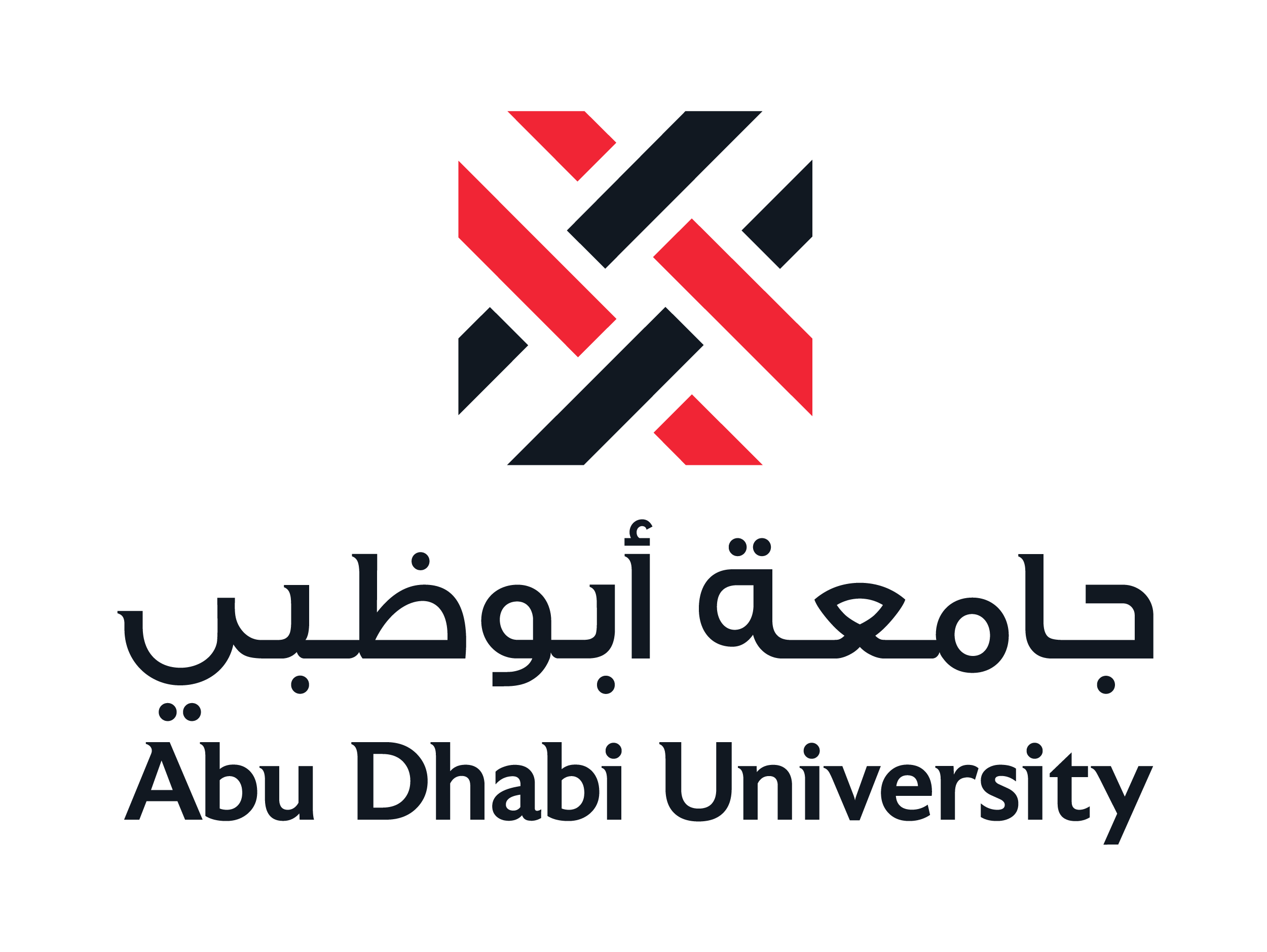

The Abu Dhabi University–Dubai (ADU Dubai) (Arabic: جامعة أبوظبي – فرع دبي) is a branch campus of the Abu Dhabi University in Dubai, United Arab Emirates. Founded in 2017 by the university's chairman Ali Saeed al-Dhaheri, it is one of three satellite campuses of the university in the country and the first campus established outside the Emirate of Abu Dhabi.

== History ==
In July 2013, The National reported that the Abu Dhabi University is planning to expand its presence in Dubai. The university's chancellor Dr. Nabil Ibrahim cited the city's free-market and diversified economy as the reason to construct a campus in Dubai, in order to primarily cater the needs of working professionals.

The plans for the establishment of Abu Dhabi University's Dubai campus was announced by the chairman of Abu Dhabi University, Ali Saeed al-Dhaheri from the pavilion of the Gulf Education and Training Exhibition (GETEX) on 13 April 2017. The university started accepting enrollment applications from May 2017 and commenced classes by September 2017. The campus was inaugurated on 11 October 2017 by Sheikh Nahyan bin Mubarak al-Nahyan, the-then Minister of Culture and Knowledge Development.
