= DISD =

DISD may refer to:

- Texas school districts with the acronym "DISD"
  - Dallas Independent School District
  - Dayton Independent School District
- German International School Dubai (Deutsche Internationale Schule Dubai)
