= University of Wollongong in Dubai =

Satellite campus in Dubai, UAE

- جامعة ولونغونغ في دبي
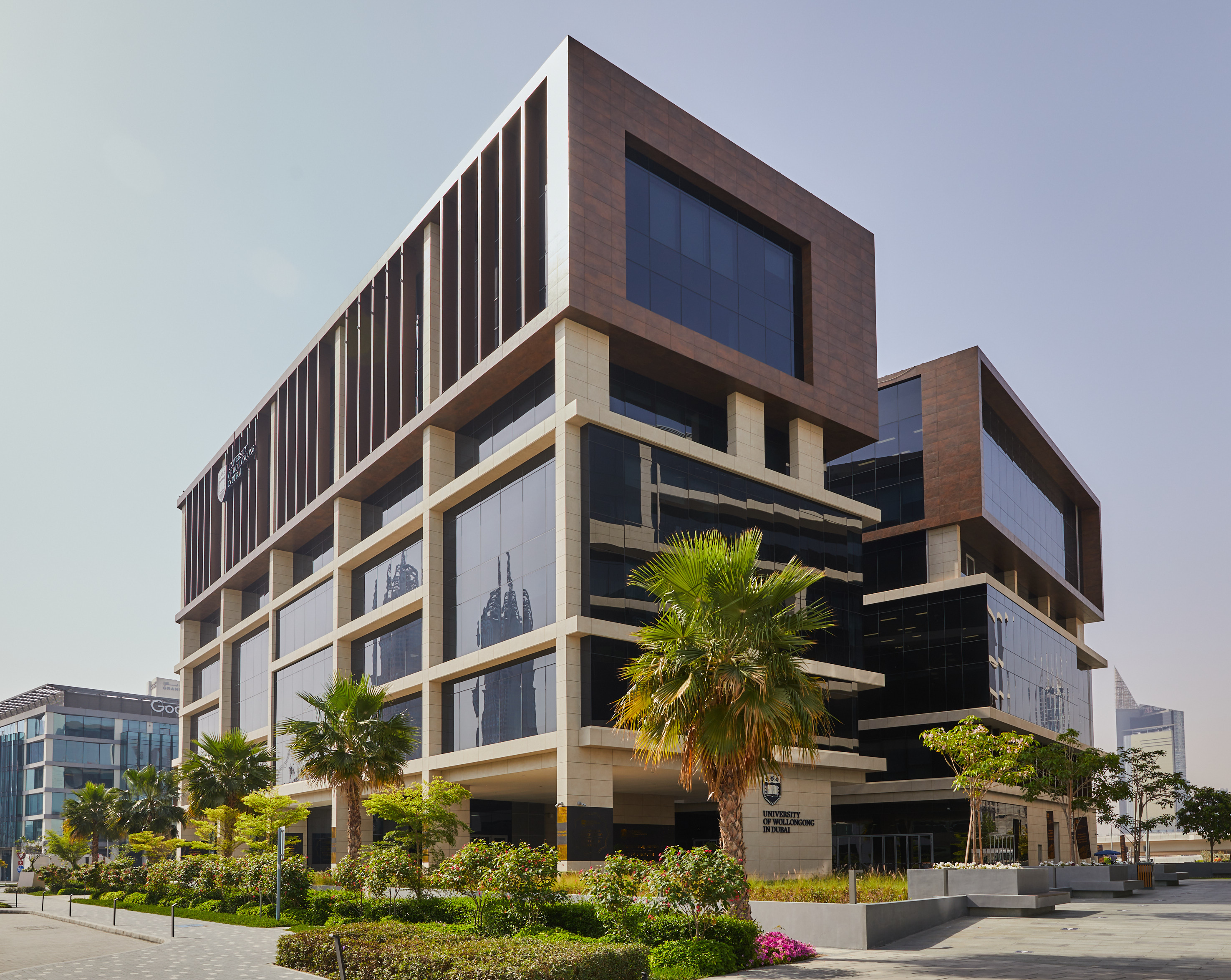
- Type: Private university
- Established: 1993
- Affiliations: University of Wollongong
- President: Professor Mohamed-Vall M. Salem ZEIN
- Administrative staff: 410 (2022)
- Students: 5191
- Undergraduates: 1,828
- Postgraduates: 1,418
- Location: Dubai Knowledge Village, Dubai, UAE; 25°10′12″N 55°16′26″E
- Campus: UOWD Building, Dubai Knowledge Village
- Website: www.uowdubai.ac.ae

The University of Wollongong in Dubai (UOWD) Arabic: جامعة ولونغونغ في دبي) is an offshore campus of the University of Wollongong in Dubai, United Arab Emirates. Established in 1993, the university is located in the Dubai Knowledge Park and serves over 5,000 students.

Unlike other foreign universities in the UAE, the University of Wollongong in Dubai is an autonomous and separate entity. While affiliated to the University of Wollongong in Australia, it remains a distinct university that is independent from the mother institution.

== History ==
In 1993, the University of Wollongong in Australia opened what was to become the University of Wollongong in Dubai in the United Arab Emirates. Initially called the Institute of Australian Studies (IAS), this centre made UOW the first foreign university to open a campus in the UAE, and the first Australian tertiary institution represented in the GCC. IAS initially offered English language programs, before becoming a 'feeder college' by 1995, where students completed part of a degree in Business or IT in Dubai before moving to Australia to complete their studies. In 1999, it was the first foreign-owned institution in the world to be issued a licence from the Federal Government of the United Arab Emirates, and was formally opened as University of Wollongong, Dubai Campus in October 2000. It was officially incorporated as University of Wollongong in Dubai in 2004. In 2009, UOWD launched the Study Abroad in Dubai programme, which enables students from overseas universities to spend a semester in Dubai, encouraging the study of Arab history and the Arabic language. Students who have completed one year of study at any university are eligible to apply. The programme costs around Dh41,300, including tuition, accommodation, and other fees. In 2010, UOWD became the first private university in the UAE with federal accreditation to offer PhD programmes, introducing a Doctor of Business Administration programme following approval from the CAA. In 2014, UOWD and the Awqaf and Minors Foundation launched an initiative offering annual scholarships to orphaned students in need of financial support. Two students received full scholarships to start their courses in September of that year. During the COVID-19 pandemic, UOWD consulted with students regarding their preferred class times and introduced distance learning, online masterclasses, virtual tours, and digital classroom environments. In 2015, UOWD awarded degrees to 545 undergraduate and postgraduate students, making it the largest graduating cohort in the university's first 22 years. In 2025, Kean University announced a partnership with UOWD. This covers potential student and faculty exchanges, collaborative research projects, joint conferences, and the exchange of academic information and materials.

== Campus ==
The UOW Dubai Campus is located in Dubai. The Campus is situated at the UOWD building in Dubai Knowledge Village, an educational free-trade zone campus in the city of Dubai that provides facilities for training and learning institutions. In addition to the administrative building, the library, the university campus includes the faculties, student lounge, Multipurpose Room and the Food Court that houses many different restaurants (the Food court is a common eating area for the entire Dubai Knowledge Village).

ISG undertook the fit-out of the 200,000 square feet (19,000 m^{2}) campus in 2019. Woods Bagot designed its interiors, and Alexander Mac served as project manager.

The Campus offers Residential Services to students, allowing them to live together in a unique multi-cultural environment conducive to academic success, personal growth, and social development. The Residences are located in Jebel Ali Gardens (approximately 15 minutes by bus from Dubai Knowledge Village).

== Accreditation ==
All UOWD undergraduate and postgraduate degrees are accredited by the UAE Ministry of Higher Education and Scientific Research (UAE) (Commission for Academic Accreditation). They are also audited by the Tertiary Education Quality and Standards Agency (TEQSA) of Australia. Certain programs are also quality accredited by international bodies like ACCA, CIM, CFAI, CIMA, CILT, CIPS etc.

In January 2026, UOWD became part of the initial stage of a federal programme offering automatic degree recognition from participating UAE higher education institutions. The federal programme is designed to reduce government bureaucracy and make it easier for graduates to meet government requirements. It also simplifies residency and visa requirements, without the need for additional qualification recognition procedures.

== See also ==
- University of Wollongong
- List of universities and colleges in the United Arab Emirates
