= Heriot-Watt University Dubai =

Satellite campus of Heriot-Watt University based in Dubai, UAE

Coordinates: 25.10217°N 55.16223°E

Heriot-Watt University Dubai Campus
- Established: 2005
- Chancellor: Sir Geoff Palmer
- Principal: Professor Richard Williams
- Provost and Vice Principal (Dubai): Professor Heather Jane McGregor
- Students: 5,000
- Location: Dubai, United Arab Emirates
- Website: www.hw.ac.uk/dubai

Heriot-Watt University Dubai Campus is a satellite campus of Heriot-Watt University based in Dubai, United Arab Emirates. Established in 2005, it was the first campus of an overseas university to open in Dubai International Academic City.

In April 2019, Heriot-Watt's Dubai campus was crowned 'Best University' in the Middle East at the first ever Forbes Middle East Higher Education Awards.

The campus received a five-star rating for three consecutive years in 2019, 2020 and 2021 from the Knowledge and Human Development Authority (KHDA), the supreme educational quality assurance and regulatory authority of the Government of Dubai.

In 2021, the Dubai campus relocated to Dubai Knowledge Park. The new campus was officially opened by His Majesty King Charles III on 30 November 2023, accompanied by Scotland’s First Minister, Humza Yousaf.

The university recently received accreditation from CAA

== History ==
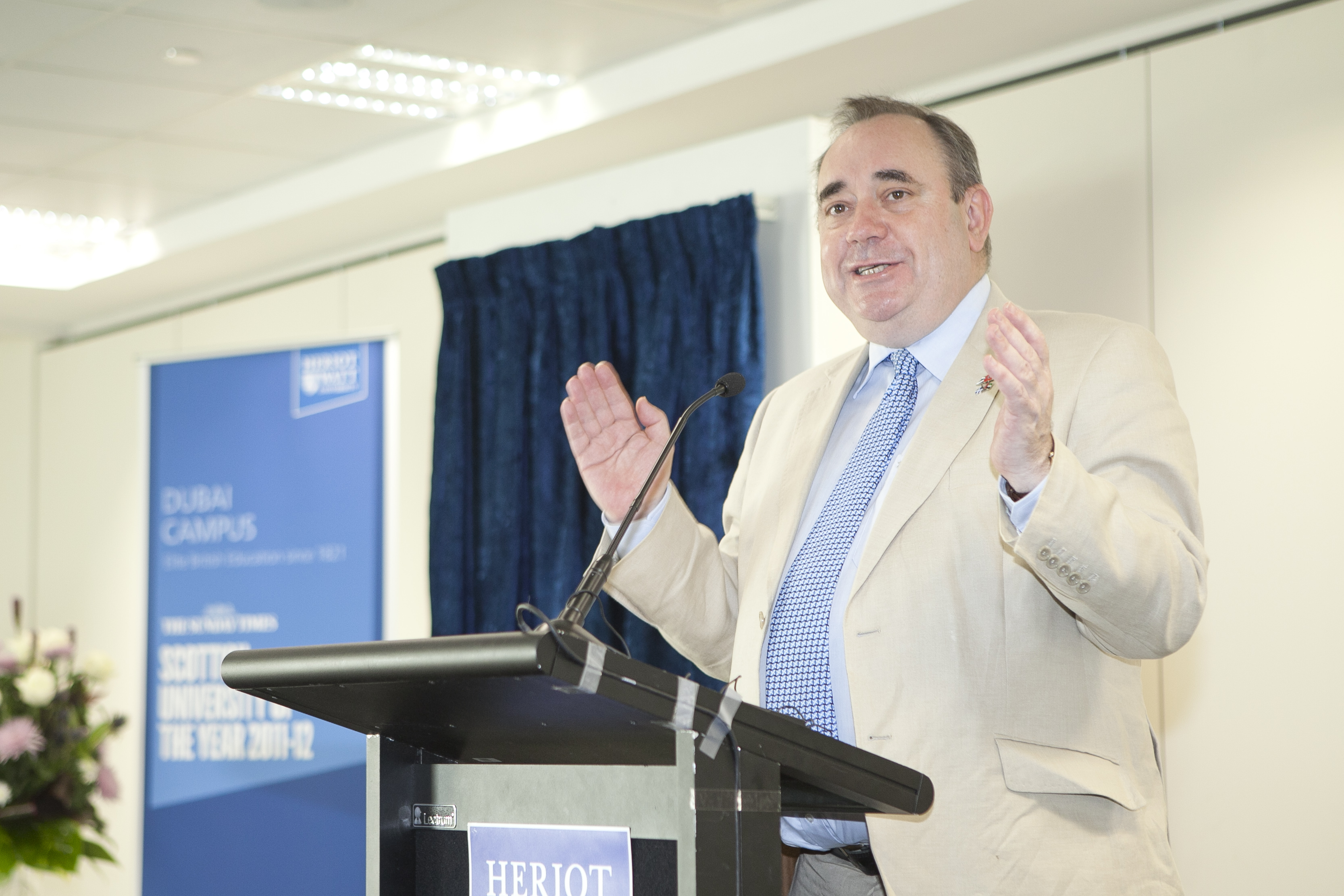
First Minister of Scotland Alex Salmond opening the new campus in November 2011

Heriot-Watt University Dubai Campus opened initially in 2005 at the Dubai International Academic City. It originally started with 120 students, with plans to increase the number to 1,500 students within a 5-year time frame. However, the pace of its expansion outstripped this projection, and by 2010 it had reached its original capacity of 2,000 students.

Construction of Heriot-Watt University's purpose-built campus in Dubai International Academic City began in July 2010. This state-of-the-art campus officially opened on 3 November 2011, increasing the capacity to 4,500 students.

In 2021, Heriot-Watt University Dubai Campus was relocated to Dubai Knowledge Park. As the largest international university in the United Arab Emirates, the student population has grown to nearly 5,000 students from 115 nationalities. The new campus was officially opened by His Majesty King Charles III on 30 November 2023, accompanied by Scotland’s First Minister, Humza Yousaf.

From 30 November to 12 December 2023, during the COP28 UN Climate Change Conference in Dubai, the fifth and sixth floors of the Dubai Knowledge Park campus operated as a Climate Hub. The Hub hosted daily events, a clean-technology exhibition, research displays, and a future-skills showcase.

In September 2025, marking the university’s twentieth year in Dubai, the James Watt Building opened at Dubai Knowledge Park. The approximately 50,000 square feet (4,600 m^{2}) extension was designed to serve more than 1,500 students. It is described to offer students classrooms and digital learning environments, as well as a wellness room.

== Campus and Campus Life ==
Heriot-Watt University established its Dubai campus in 2005. Since 2021, the campus has been based at Dubai Knowledge Park, having previously operated in Dubai International Academic City. Its premises occupy approximately 218,000 square feet (20,300 m^{2}) across seven floors. The Knowledge Park campus was created by converting an existing office building.

The campus includes collaborative lecture theatres and seminar rooms, engineering and psychology laboratories, an IT laboratory, a design hub, the Global Incubator, a Bloomberg Trading Room, a library and a central Student Services Centre.

The university lists private accommodation options, including student residences, hotels and serviced apartments. Students contact the providers directly, and housing arrangements are made between the student and the provider, with the university not being a party to the agreement.

Student activities and events are organized by the Student Council in collaboration with the student body at Heriot-Watt University. The Student Council is headed by the Student President who is elected on an annual basis by Heriot-Watt University Dubai Campus Students. The Student Council makes the major decisions regarding student activities. These include the annual Watt Fest, International Days, Scottish Highland Games, charity drives, picnics etc.

In January 2022, the Knowledge Park campus received LEED Gold certification. The certified design recorded a 46% reduction in water use compared with the LEED baseline.

In September 2023, the university launched a rooftop Solar Energy Test Site at the Dubai campus. The facility can accommodate between 24 and 32 solar panels and includes a weather station connected to a data centre on the campus’s top floor.

In 2025, the Dubai campus’s Atlas Racing student team won the FS-AI Real World Award and the Babcock FS-AI Overall Statics Award at Formula Student UK.

From 20 to 22 May 2025, the campus hosted the Association for the Advancement of Artificial Intelligence’s Summer Symposium Series.

== Courses ==
One of the first higher education providers to be licensed by the Knowledge and Human Development Authority in Dubai (KHDA), Heriot-Watt's degrees are also accredited by royal charter in the UK. While the campus initially offered business, management, engineering and information technology programs, it now offers more than 50 undergraduate and postgraduate (Master's degree and PhD) programs across the following schools:

- The School of Energy, Geoscience, Infrastructure and Society
- The School of Engineering and Physical Sciences
- The School of Social Sciences
- The School of Mathematical and Computer Sciences
- The School of Textiles and Design
- The Edinburgh Business School

For the 2023–24 academic year, the campus added a Bachelor of Engineering in Robotics, Autonomous and Interactive Systems to its engineering provision.

Selected postgraduate programmes hold professional accreditation. The MSc Facilities Management is accredited by the Royal Institution of Chartered Surveyors, while the MSc Construction Project Management is accredited by both RICS and the Chartered Institute of Building.

Through the university’s Go Global programme, eligible Dubai students may transfer to a UK or Malaysian campus for a semester, an academic year or longer, provided their degree programme is available at the destination campus.

At the Dubai Campus, students gain a degree that is taught and examined to the same standards as at the university's campus. All of the programs are taught by Heriot-Watt's own faculty, the majority of whom are permanently located in Dubai, supplemented by visiting experts in key fields.

== Notable alumni ==
Chirag Suri

== See also ==
- Heriot-Watt University
- List of universities in the United Arab Emirates
- Education in Dubai
