= Liwa University =

- جامعة ليوا
- Motto: We Prepare for Future Careers
- Type: Private
- Established: 1993
- Faculty: 120
- Students: 2,840
- Location: Abu Dhabi, UAE; 24.5000°N 54.5000°E
- Website: www.lu.ac.ae

The Liwa University (LU; Arabic: جامعة ليوا), formerly known as Liwa College and Emirates College of Technology, is an institution of higher education located in Abu Dhabi, United Arab Emirates. The interior of the University was designed by Education Design International and completed in 2023.

== Accreditation and certifications ==
LU is licensed by the Ministry of Higher Education and Scientific Research (MOHESR) of the United Arab Emirates to award degrees in higher education. The University was first licensed in 2003. Each of LC's bachelor's degree and Diploma programs is accredited by the Commission for Academic Accreditation, a unit of the UAE Ministry of Education. In 2025, Liwa University has been ranked 36 out of the private universities in the UAE by the AD Scientific Index.

== Enrollment ==
In Fall 2014, LC enrolled about 2,840 students. 56% of the students are male and about 70% are Emirati nationals. A total of 35 nationalities are represented in the student body. The majority of students attend evening or weekend classes. LC has 108 full-time and 12 part-time faculty, and 106 staff.
