= Academic City =

Academic City may refer to:

- Akademgorodok, Siberia
- Dubai International Academic City, United Arab Emirates

== See also ==
- College town
- Category:Academic enclaves
