= MODUL University Dubai =

Coordinates: 25.07233°N 55.14528°E

- Logo of MODUL University Dubai
- Motto: Expanding Horizons
- Type: Private
- Established: 2016 (closed)
- Affiliations: MODUL University Vienna
- Rector: Jörg Finsinger
- Location: Dubai, United Arab Emirates
- Website: www.modul.ac.ae

MODUL University Dubai (MU Dubai, MDLU Dubai, MUDC) is a university campus of MODUL University Vienna, which started its operations in Dubai, United Arab Emirates in November 2015.

The Dubai Campus opened in September 2016 in ONE JLT, Jumeirah Lakes Towers. In October 2020, the UAE Ministry of Education revoked its licence for the university to operate in the UAE.

== Name ==
MODUL University Vienna (MU Vienna) derives its name from the honeycomb-like structure of the Tourism College MODUL, situated in Vienna's 19th district. Established between 1973 and 1975, both the school and its adjacent hotel are constructed in octagonal-shaped conjoined 'modules'. While the university collaborates closely with the Tourism College MODUL, attendance at the college is not a requirement for admission to MU Vienna.^{(no reference)}

== MODUL University Dubai Campus ==
MODUL University Dubai Campus is located in Dubai Multi Commodities Centre (DMCC, Jumeirah Lakes Towers) in the newly established ONE JLT on the 4th floor.

Total area of the Campus is 22,000 sqft. Around 600 students can study in the Campus at once.

The following is available at ONE JLT:

- Visitor parking and valet services
- Serviced by 2 Metro Stations with access to Sheikh Zayed Road
- High speed passenger lifts (3m/sec)
- 24-hour security with access control & CCTV
- Common prayer room on Level 1
- Dedicated bicycle parking with showers & changing rooms

== Accreditation ==
MODUL University Dubai has been duly licensed and approved by the Knowledge and Human Development Authority

== Bodies and advisory boards in Vienna ==
MU Vienna is governed by a three-member board of directors: the president, the vice president and managing director. The University Council consists of five representatives who support the development of MU Vienna, and the president and CEO attend the meetings and report on the university's developments. The University Assembly consists of all faculty members, two representatives of external lecturers, two representatives of administrative staff, and four students. The University Assembly is chaired by the president, and has the task is to elect the members of committees, and to propose candidates for the offices of president and vice president.

MU Vienna is among the first universities in Austria to have an industry advisory board in place. Industry experts from the fields of new media technology, public governance, and tourism provide input for the development of curriculum and guidance in student programs that will further the educational experience of students seeking long-term careers.

== Bodies and advisory boards in Dubai ==
MODUL University Dubai was founded by Dubai Investments Industries and DACH Advisory. It is the first University from Austria being located in United Arab Emirates and Middle East.

Academic Head is Jörg Finsinger.

=== Signing ceremony ===
A shareholders' agreement was signed to outline the framework for the new campus in the presence of Khalid Bin Kalban, managing director and CEO of Dubai Investments, H.E. Walter Ruck, President of Vienna Chamber of Commerce - owners of MODUL University Vienna, Zaid Maleh, CEO of DACH Advisory Group, H.E. Peter Elsner-Mackay, Austrian Ambassador to the UAE, Mohammed Saeed Al Raqbani, General Manager of Dubai Investments Industries, and other top officials.

During the ceremony, the below was said:

Education is one of the fastest growing sectors in the UAE, driven by a growing population and the rising demand for quality education. Dubai Investments is committed to play a pivotal role in facilitating the knowledge-sharing; and bringing the prestigious MODUL University to Dubai is a step in the direction amidst unprecedented growth opportunities on offer in the UAE education sector. Only 2% of institutions in the UAE offer courses in tourism and hospitality, whereas this sector alone employs over 530,000 professionals in the country. With the tourism and hospitality sector forecast to grow 9% year-on-year and government's increased emphasis on boosting tourism avenues, we feel MODUL University Dubai is the right fit in the UAE market, with its strong legacy in the tourism and hospitality education worldwide.

Khalid Bin Kalban, managing director and CEO of Dubai Investments

MODUL University Vienna enjoys a sterling international reputation for its standards and the reputed Austrian know-how in education. The comprehensive academic curriculum, particularly in the tourism and hospitality sector, will prepare students in the UAE and the GCC for the competitive world. We are happy to join hands with Dubai Investments and DACH ADVISORY in achieving this

H.E. Walter Ruck, President of Vienna Chamber of Commerce - owners of MODUL University Vienna

== Academic programs ==
=== Undergraduate ===
- Bachelor of Business Administration in Tourism & Hospitality Management
- Bachelor of Science in International Management

=== MSc ===
- Master of Science in Sustainable Development, Management and Policy

=== MBA ===
- Master of Business Administration – General
- Master of Business Administration – major in Tourism and Hotel Development
- Master of Business Administration – major in New Media and Information Management
- Master of Business Administration – major in Major in Entrepreneurship, Innovation and Leadership

=== Vocational Programs ===
- Short-term vocational courses, spanning six months to one-year duration, will also be offered for hospitality professionals in the UAE. All courses will be taught in English and accredited in both Austria and the UAE.

== Sustainability as a fundamental principle ==
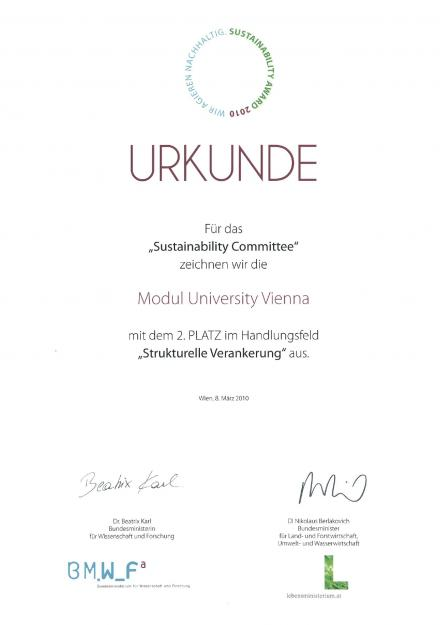
Sustainability Award Certificate

MODUL University Vienna has identified sustainability as one of its key principles. Sustainability represents an integral part of the curriculum and research agenda, and is also reflected in the daily work-flow. The university operates in a manner that minimizes environmental risk and adverse effects on the environment. The solar panels, pellet heating and recycling system in the university building are just some examples of the sustainable living and thinking within the university. In addition, MODUL University Vienna was the first Austrian university to sign a contract with a renewable energy provider. An internal ‘Sustainability Committee’ (SC) composed of staff, faculty and students works to maintain and improve the university's sustainability goals.

MODUL University was awarded 2nd place in the category "Structural Foundations," encouraging sustainable development at the 2010 Sustainability Awards presented by the Austrian Federal Ministry of Agriculture, Forestry, Environment and Water Management and the Austrian Federal Ministry of Science and Research for its Sustainability Committee. At the 2012 awards it won first place in the category "Structural Foundation" and third place in the category "Teaching & Curricula/International Cooperations".

The committee gives two awards annually for the best ideas for sustainability implementable at the university; the Scholarship of Hope for students and the Employee Sustainability Award for the staff and faculty. Extracurricular activities such as movie nights and excursions to sustainable energy producers are also arranged by the Sustainability Committee.
