= Abu Dhabi University =

Private university in Abu Dhabi, United Arab Emirates

- جامعة أبوظبي
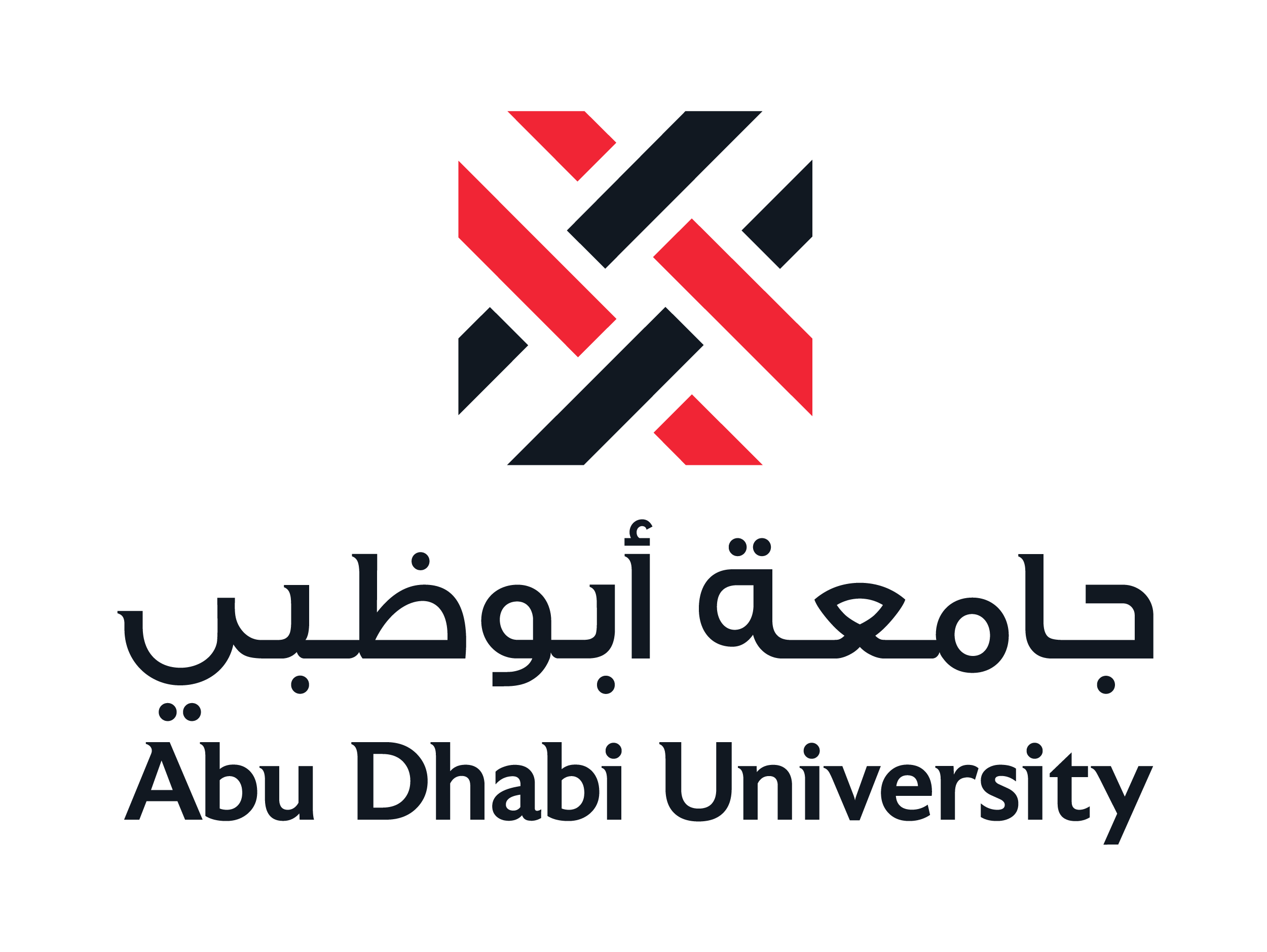
- Motto: Knowledge to achieve and wisdom to lead
- Type: Private research university
- Established: 25 June 2003; 22 years ago
- Founders: Ali bin Harmal Dhaheri
- Accreditation: CAA; ADEK
- Academic affiliations: WASC; EQUIS; AACSB; SHRM; RIBA
- Chairman: Ali bin Harmal Dhaheri
- Chancellor: Ghassan Aouad
- Academic staff: 145
- Students: 8,000 undergraduate and postgraduate students
- Location: Khalifa City, Abu Dhabi, United Arab Emirates; 24°22′0″N 54°33′52″E
- Other campuses: Al Ain; Dubai; Madinat Zayed
- Website: www.adu.ac.ae

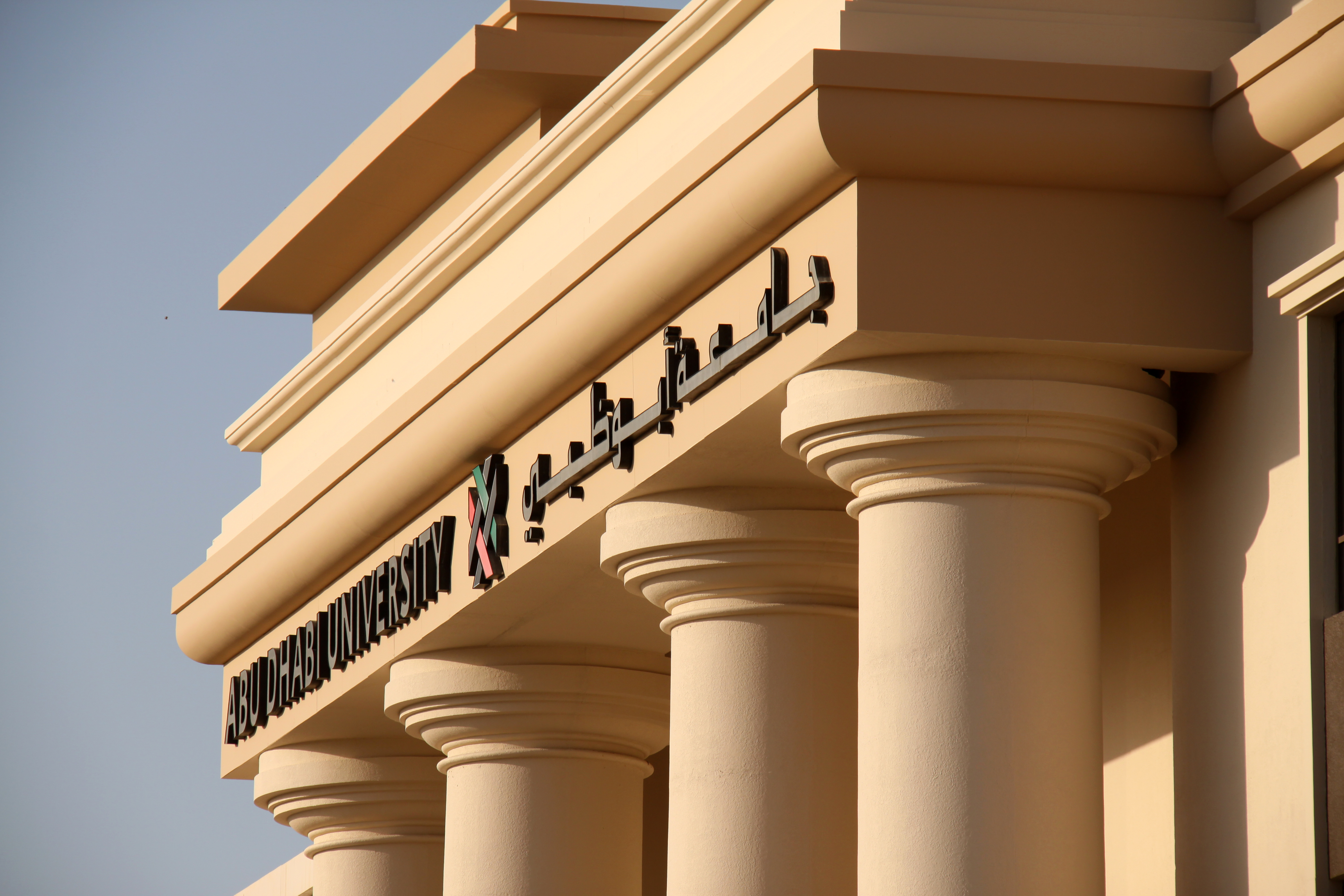
Abu Dhabi University

Abu Dhabi University (ADU) (Arabic: جامعة أبوظبي) is a private research university with its main campus in Khalifa City, Abu Dhabi, United Arab Emirates, and satellite campuses in Al Ain, Dubai and Madinat Zayed. Founded in 2003 by Ali Saeed bin Harmal al-Dhaheri, it is the largest private institution in the country that offers courses in various subjects up to post-graduation.

== Overview ==
The university's inception can be traced to the Charter of Abu Dhabi University in the year 2000 by Sheikh Hamdan bin Zayed al-Nayhan, the-then Deputy Prime Minister of the United Arab Emirates. Following three years of planning, the Abu Dhabi University was inaugurated in June 2003 and opened its doors to students in September 2003. According to the university, its founders "envisioned an institution that would be among the best in the United Arab Emirates, the Arabian Gulf region, and the world".

== Accreditation ==
The College of Business Administration received AACSB accreditation in 2015 and EQUIS in 2017. Some College of Engineering programs received accreditation from ABET in 2015. In 2016 the university gained accreditation from the Western Association of Schools and Colleges (WASC) in the United States. The Bachelor of Architecture course at Abu Dhabi University (ADU) earned the Royal Institute of British Architects (RIBA) accreditation in 2018. Abu Dhabi University is a partner with CIMA who has been accredited through the CIMA Global Learning scheme. Abu Dhabi University is accredited by the Commission for Academic Accreditation (CAA), the UAE Federal Government's quality assurance agency for higher education.

== ADU Smart Learning Center ==
Abu Dhabi University launched the 'ADU Smart Learning Center' to upskill faculty, design courses.

== Colleges and programs ==
Abu Dhabi University provides both undergraduate and postgraduate programs, and consists of four colleges along with an English Language Institute. It currently has 8,000 students from 70 countries.

== Campuses ==
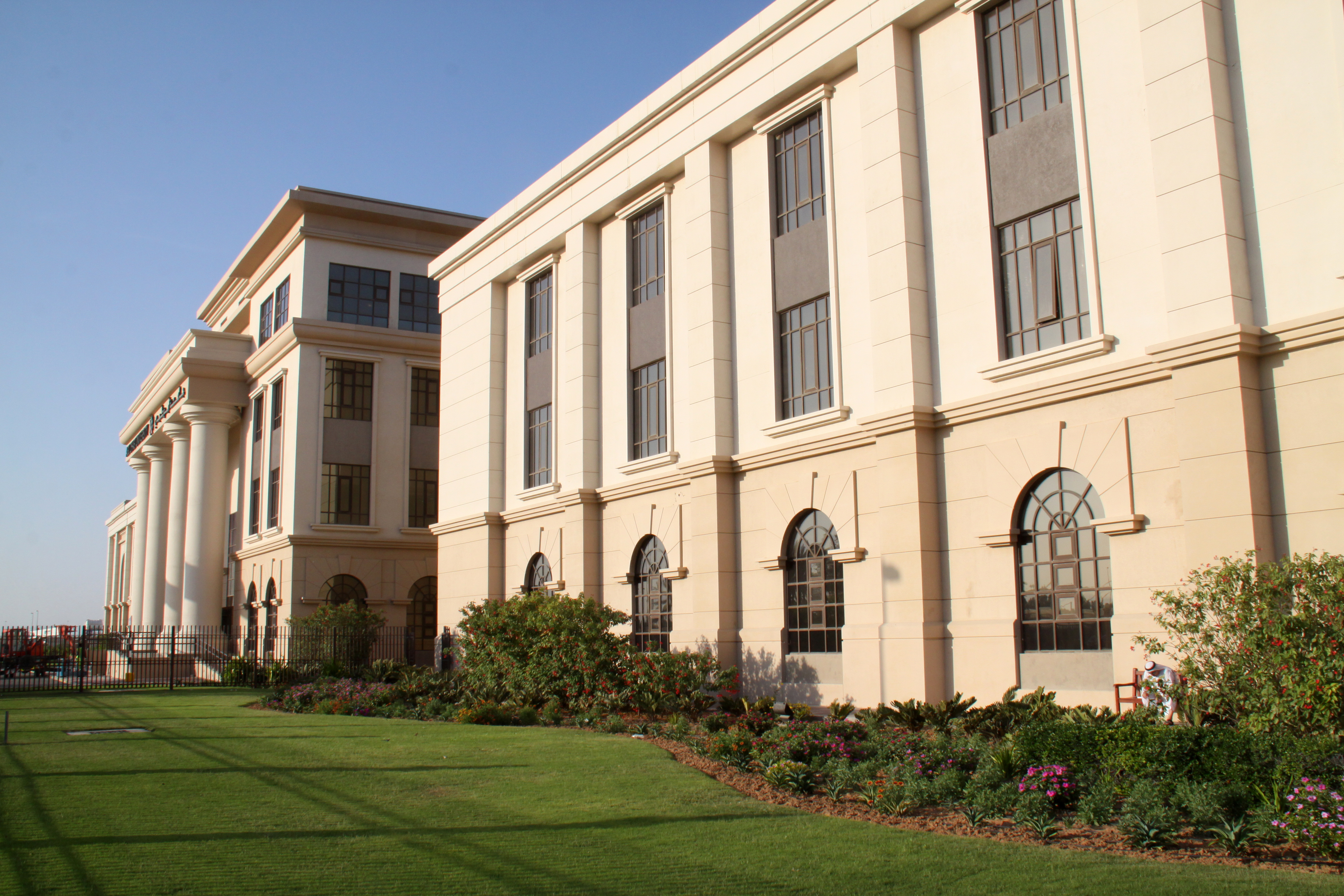
Abu Dhabi University

=== Abu Dhabi Campus ===
Scheduled to open in August 2016, an expansion will also feature 12 classrooms, 110 faculty and staff offices, meeting rooms, and multi-purpose rooms.

=== Al Ain Campus ===
Opened in 2003 as one of the oldest campuses of the university. In 2017, a new campus in Al Ain was scheduled to open by September 2019 at a $81M cost. The new expansions will feature 70 classrooms and 137 offices, providing capacity for more than 2500 students.

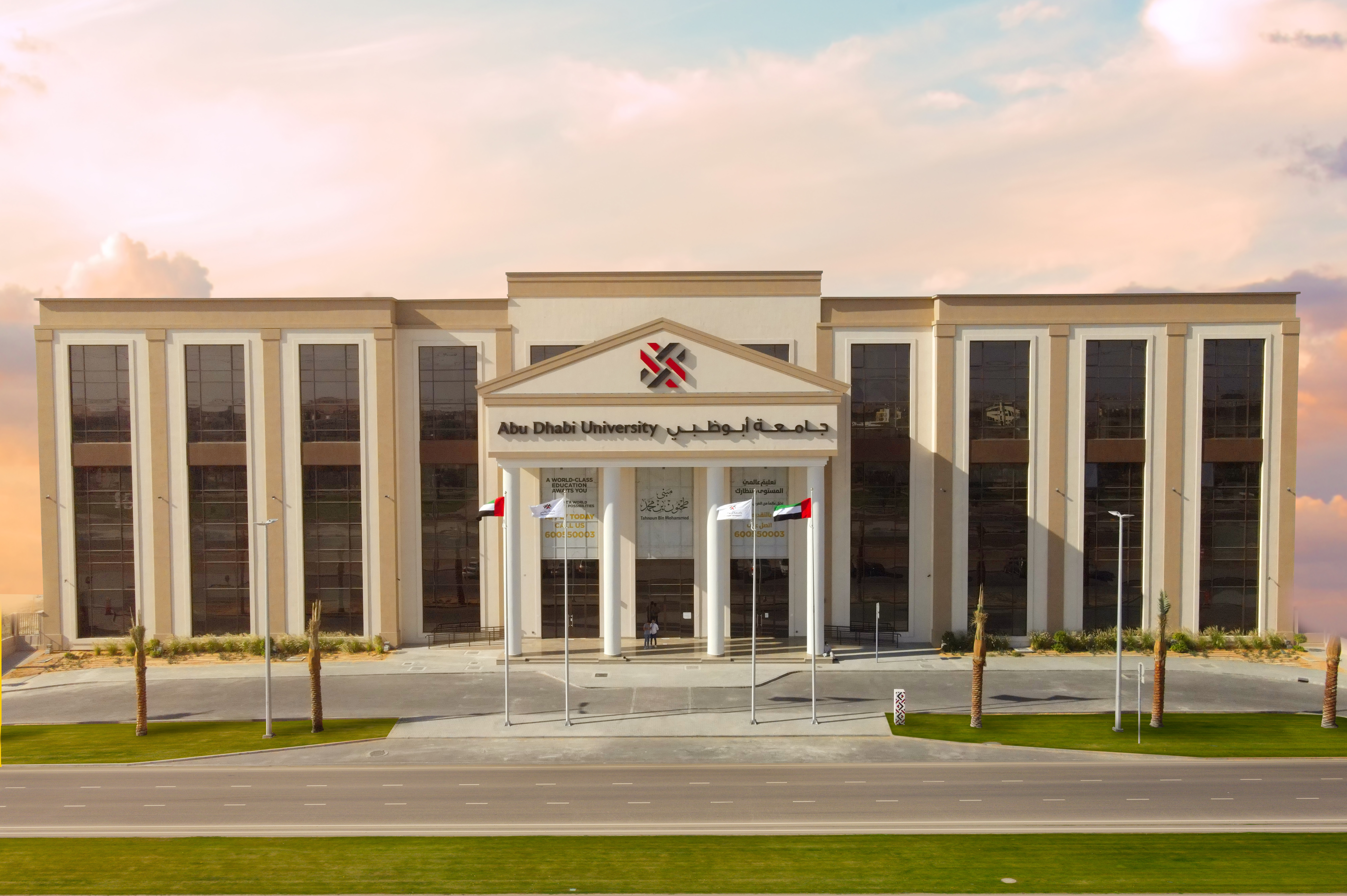

=== Dubai Campus ===
Abu Dhabi University opened a new campus in Dubai located in Dubai Knowledge Park in September 2017. The 3,490-square-metre campus was inaugurated by Shaikh Nahyan Bin Mubarak Al Nahyan, Minister of Culture and Knowledge Development, who is also the vice-president of ADU's Board of Regents.

== International ranking ==
University rankings

Global – Overall
- QS World: 391 (2026)

The QS World Universities ranked Abu Dhabi University one of the best 750 best universities in the world (and 6th in the United Arab Emirates) in 2018.
