= British University in Dubai =

Non-profit institution in Dubai, United Arab Emirates

Coordinates: 25°7′30.504″N 55°24′36.55″E

The British University in Dubai
- الجامعة البريطانية في دبي
- Type: Private
- Established: 19 May 2003; 23 years ago
- Founder: Sheikh Maktoum bin Rashid Al Maktoum
- Chancellor: Ahmed bin Saeed Al Maktoum
- Vice-Chancellor: Prof. Abdullah Mohammed Alshamsi
- Location: Dubai International Academic City, Dubai, UAE
- Website: Official website

The British University in Dubai (BUiD) (Arabic: الجامعة البريطانية في دبي) is a research-based, non-profit institution in Dubai, United Arab Emirates. Founded in 2003 by the country's Vice President and Prime Minister Maktoum bin Rashid al-Maktoum, it is licensed by the UAE's Ministry of Education's Higher Education Affairs and all its programmes are accredited by the Commission for Academic Accreditation (CAA).

BUiD is part of a strategic alliance with three UK Russell Group universities: University of Edinburgh, the University of Manchester, and University of Glasgow.

BUiD is located in Dubai International Academic City, Dubai.

== Overview ==
The original idea for the university had emanated from the Dubai-UK Trade and Economic Committee (DUKTEC), which comprised nominees of the Government of Dubai and the Government of the United Kingdom. It was first thought that a British university would assist with the recruitment and retention of British expatriate workers, but a subsequent survey was inconclusive on this point. There was already range of undergraduate provision in the emirate, and many undergraduates preferring to study away from home. Further, discussions intensified the opportunity for a research-based university to make a more substantial contribution to Dubai's development aspirations.

BUiD was established as a not-for-profit institution. The University was established by Law #5/2003 by His Highness Sheikh Maktoum bin Rashid bin Saeed Al Maktoum, Ruler of Dubai Its founders are Al Maktoum Foundation, Dubai Development and Investment Authority (now Dubai Holding), the National Bank of Dubai (now Emirates NBD), the British Business Group, and Rolls-Royce.

BUiD works in collaboration with leading organisations and institutions including its major contributing partner Atkins, Knowledge Fund Establishment, and the UAE Ministry of Education, and government and associated bodies across the UAE’s public and private sectors.

== Programmes ==
Bachelors Programmes:

- Bachelor of Law
- Bachelor of Science in Business Management
- Bachelor of Science in Electro-Mechanical Engineering
- Bachelor of Science in Electrical and Electronics Engineering
- Bachelor of Science in Mechanical Engineering
- Bachelor of Science in Civil Engineering
- Bachelor of Science in Computer Science (Artificial Intelligence)
- Bachelor of Science in Computer Science (Cybersecurity)

Masters Programmes:

- Master of Education (Educational Management/ Leadership and Policy/ Diversity and Inclusive Education/ Applied Linguistics and Language Learning/ STEM Education/ Educational Psychology and Counselling/ General Education)
- Master of Business Administration (MBA) (General)
- Masters of Science in Project Management
- Master of Science in Finance and Risk Management
- Master of Science in Construction Law and Dispute Resolution
- Master of Science in Engineering Management
- Master of Science in Structural Engineering
- Master of Science in Artificial Intelligence
- Master of Science in Cybersecurity
- Master of Science in Sustainable Design of the Built Environment

PhD Programmes:

- Doctor of Education and PhD in Education
- Professional Doctorate in Business Administration (DBA)
- PhD in Business Management
- PhD in Project Management
- PhD in Engineering Management
- PhD in Sustainable Built Environments
- PhD in Computer Science
- PhD in Business Law

Scholarships Programmes

- UG Scholarships
- PG Scholarships
