= Heather McGregor =

British executive, journalist and academic

Dame Heather McGregor DBE FRSE
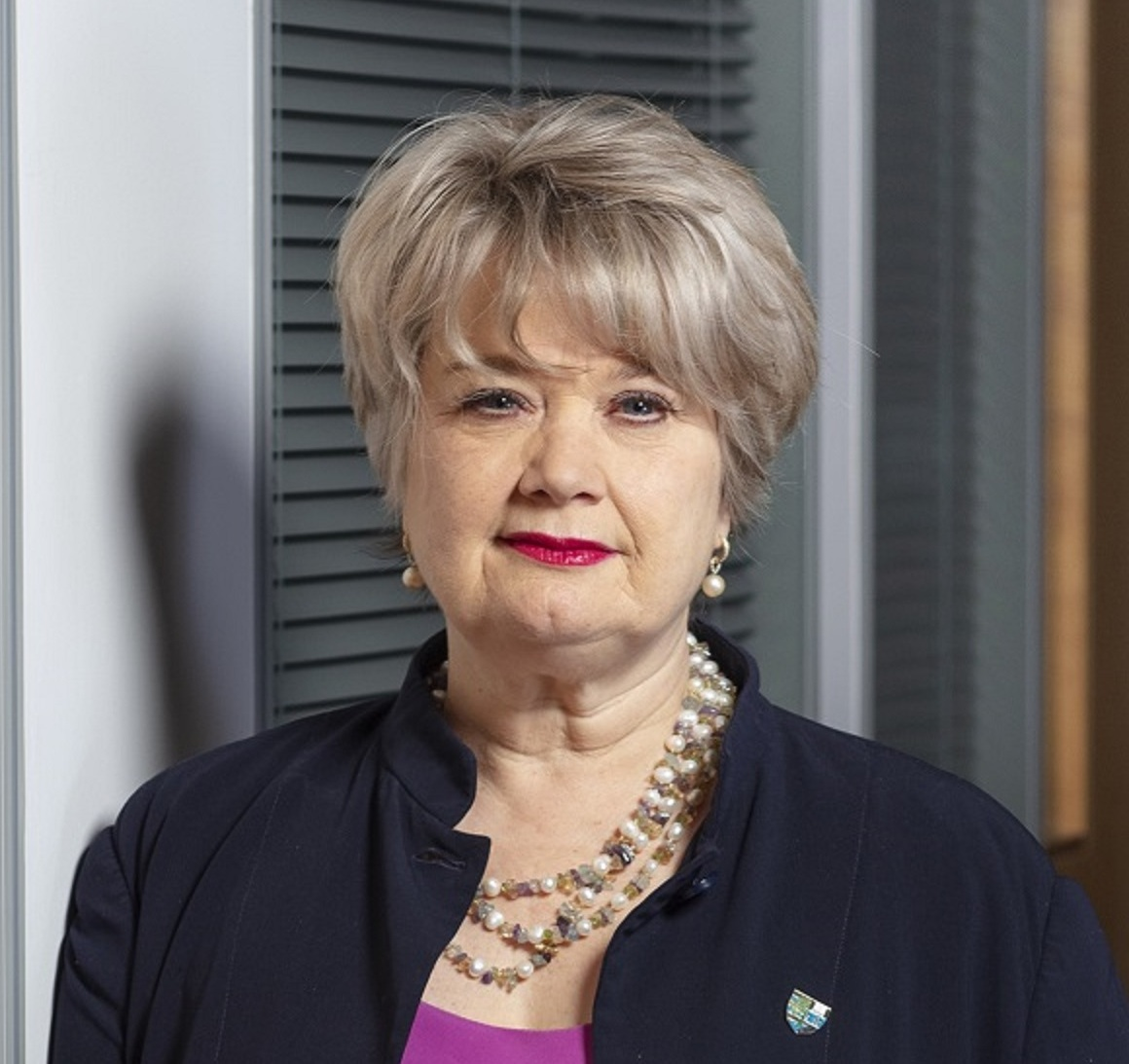
- Professor Heather J. McGregor in 2022
- Born: Heather Jane McGregor; 27 March 1962 (age 63); U.K.
- Occupations: Academic, journalist, executive

Provost and Vice Principal of Heriot-Watt University Dubai
- Incumbent
- Assumed office 1 September 2022

Dame Heather Jane McGregor DBE FRSE (born 27 March 1962) is a British executive, journalist, and academic, known for writing under the moniker "Mrs Moneypenny".

== Biography ==
She is the Provost and Vice Principal of Heriot-Watt University Dubai since 1 September 2022. Prior to that and since 2016, she has been Executive Dean of Edinburgh Business School, Heriot Watt University. She wrote a column for the Financial Times from 1999 to 2016 as "Mrs Moneypenny", and was the chief executive of Taylor Bennett from 2000 to 2016.

In 2008, McGregor established the Taylor Bennett Foundation, a charity that encourages black, Asian and minority ethnic people to consider a career in communications and PR. She was a founding member of the 30% Club, which campaigns for more women on the boards of FTSE 100 companies. In 2013, she appeared on a celebrity special episode of Come Dine with Me. She was also elected as a fellow to the Royal Society of Edinburgh in March 2021. McGregor was a columnist for The Sunday Times between September 2019 and March 2021.

== Awards ==
She was appointed Commander of the Order of the British Empire (CBE) in the 2015 Birthday Honours for services to business, especially employment skills and diversity in the workplace, and Dame Commander of the Order of the British Empire (DBE) in the 2023 New Year Honours for services to education, business and heritage in Scotland.
