= University of Dubai =

University in Dubai, United Arab Emirates

Coordinates: 25.10608°N 55.41439°E

- جامعة دبي
- Type: Private
- Established: 1997
- President: Eesa Mohammed Bastaki
- Location: Dubai, United Arab Emirates
- Website: ud.ac.ae

University rankings

Global – Overall
- QS World: 851-900 (2026)

The University of Dubai (UD; Arabic: جامعة دبي) is a private university located in Dubai, United Arab Emirates. Established in 1997, it is licensed nationally by the Ministry of Higher Education and Scientific Research.
