= Jörg Finsinger =

German economist

Jörg Finsinger (born October 28, 1950, in Ettlingen) is a German economist.

== Affiliations ==
- Corresponding Member of the Austrian Academy of Sciences.

== Publications (selection) ==
- Jörg Finsinger, Jürgen Simon, The Harmonisation of Product Liability Laws in Britain and Germany, An Applied Legal-Economic Analysis (London: Anglo-German Foundation 1992). ISBN 978-0-905492-77-3
- Jörg Borrmann, Jörg Finsinger, Markt und Regulierung (Vahlen München 1999) ISBN 978-3-8006-2471-3
- Jörg Finsinger, Versicherungsmärkte (Campus-Verlag Frankfurt 1997) ISBN 978-3-593-33227-7
