= Lincoln University of Business and Management =

LUBM - Lincoln University of Business and Management
- Motto: Keep Learning, Keep Growing
- Type: Private
- Established: 2014
- Location: Sharjah, United Arab Emirates; 25.332132°N 55.390148°E
- Website: www.lincoln-edu.ae

Lincoln University of Business and Management (LUBM) is a private institution based in Sharjah, United Arab Emirates, with campuses in Sharjah and Fujairah. LUBM offers management programs in bachelor, master and diploma levels in association with international institutions.

== History ==
Lincoln University of Business and Management is an organization imparting business and management education to working adults in the Middle East and beyond. The institute was established in 2014 and has trained approximately 1,000 students in the region.

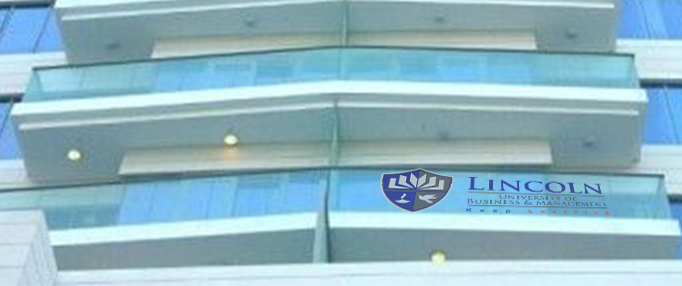
Lincoln University of Business and Management - United Arab Emirates
