= Emirates Institute for Banking and Financial Studies =

University in Dubai

Emirates Institute for Finance (EIF)
- معهد الامارات للدراسات المصرفية والمالية
- Established: 1983
- Chairman: Khaled Mohamed Balama
- Academic staff: 25
- Administrative staff: 45
- Location: The United Arab Emirates: Sharjah; Abu Dhabi; Dubai
- Vice Chairman: Saif Al Daheri
- Website: www.eif.gov.ae

Emirates Institute for Finance (EIF; معهد الإمارات للدراسات المصرفية والمالية) is an educational institute that was established in 1983 in Sharjah in the United Arab Emirates. The Institute has three campuses, at Sharjah, Abu Dhabi and Dubai.

The Institute is currently offering a Bachelor of Science in Banking and Finance (BSBF), a Higher Banking Diploma program (HBD), and an Islamic Banking Diploma program (IBD), etc. and host of other training programs in the area of banking and insurance.

== History ==
=== Introduction ===
EIF was founded in 1983 to cater to the human resources development needs of the UAE Banking sector.

In 1990, the Banking Diploma Program was introduced and delivered exclusively by EIBFS. Since its inception in 1990, 442 students have graduated from the program. Most are working in the banking sector and several are holding senior positions.

In 1996, the EIF took a step forward by signing an agreement with The Institute of Canadian Bankers, Montreal, Canada. This agreement formed the basis of cooperation for offering The Higher Banking Diploma Program. Since its inception in 1997, 60 students have graduated from the program to which most are working in the banking sector and many are holding senior positions.

=== Banking and Finance UAE ===
EIF officially launched "Banking and Finance UAE" Magazine in December 2003. "Banking and Finance UAE" is a once a year publication that covers a wide range of topics likes finance, banking, IT applications; Global banking; human resources management, risk management, Basel Accord, and Islamic banking & finance. The magazine aims to provide executives with the information required to keep them up to date with the rapid changes taking place within their industry. The magazine is the first of its kind in the United Arab Emirates; it covers one of the most important sectors in the UAE’s promising economy - the banking and financial sector. Since its first issue, the Magazine has steadily grown in recognition and credibility to become one of the UAE’s most reputed publications. The magazine was issued following a thorough study, which showed the market needed a magazine specialized in both banking and financial sectors. Banking and Finance was issued to serve these two broad sectors, which have a broad base of readers' community.

== Accreditation ==
Emirates Institute for Finance (EIF; معهد الإمارات للدراسات المصرفية والمالية) is accredited by the Commission for Academic Accreditation (CAA), the UAE Federal Government's quality assurance agency for higher education. To check the CAA's active accredited programs at Emirates Institute for Finance (EIF; معهد الإمارات للدراسات المصرفية والمالية), visit this link.

== Study Programs ==
=== Academic programs ===
- Bachelor of Science in Banking and Finance (BSBF)
- Banking Diploma (BD)
- Higher Banking Diploma (HBD)
- Islamic Banking Diploma (IBD)

=== Training Programs ===
- Banking and Finance Program Categories
- Anti Money Laundering Programs
- Bank Science & Operations Programs
- Banking English Programs
- Capital & Share Market
- Credit Management, Corporate & Project Finance
- E- Banking Applications Programs
- Human Resources Management & Leadership Programs
- Insurance English Programs
- Insurance Management Programs
- Insurance Operations Programs
- Islamic Banking Programs
- Marketing, Sales & Customer Service Programs
- Private Certificates
- Risk Management & Compliance Programs
- Treasury & Investment Programs
- Insurance Training Categories
- Insurance Programs
- English Programs
- Management Programs

=== Professional Certificate Programs ===
- International Certification Program in Banking Operations (CBO)
- International Certification Program in Credit Management (CCM)
- Certified Documentary Credit Specialist (CDCS)
- Certified Branch Manager (CBM)
- Chartered Financial Analyst (CFA®)
- Chartered Institute for Securities & Investment Qualifications (CISI)
- ICA International Certificate in Compliance Awareness
- ICA International Certificate in Anti Money Laundering Awareness
- International Certification Program in Finance Accounting and Business (CFAB)
- International Certification Program – Certified International Retail Banker
- International Certification Program – Professional in Human Resources (CPHR)
