= German International School Dubai =

Dubai based German language school

Coordinates: 25.1493°N 55.2472°E

German International School Dubai German: Deutsche Internationale Schule Dubai

Information
- Established: 2008; 17 years ago
- Grades: K-12
- Enrollment: c.600 (2015)
- Website: germanschool.ae/en/

German International School Dubai (German: Deutsche Internationale Schule Dubai, DISD) is a German international school in Academic City, Dubai, United Arab Emirates. It serves kindergarten and grades 1–12.

It was established in 2008. As of February 2015 the school has over 500 students in school grades and over 100 in kindergarten. The German International School Dubai moved to its new campus in Academic City in the 2015–2016 school year.

The school proctors the Abitur exam.
