= Manipal Academy of Higher Education, Dubai =

Private deemed university in Dubai

- Former names: Manipal University
- Motto: प्रज्ञानं ब्रह्म (Sanskrit)
- Motto in English: Inspired By Life
- Type: Institute of Eminence
- Established: 2000
- Parent institution: Manipal Academy of Higher Education
- Chancellor: Ramdas M Pai
- Vice-Chancellor: Lt. Gen. (Dr.) M. D. Venkatesh
- Director: Dr. Sudhindra S.
- Location: Dubai, United Arab Emirates
- Campus: Dubai
- Colours: Cobalt Blue and Orange
- Website: www.manipaldubai.com

Manipal Academy of Higher Education, Dubai previously known as Manipal University Dubai is a branch campus of Manipal Academy of Higher Education, India. Manipal Academy of Higher Education, Dubai was founded in 2000 and enrolls over 2000 students.

== Location ==
The campus is located in DIAC Dubai International Academic City. It is 850,000 sq ft. and has a library, laboratories, a cafeteria, and sporting facilities.

== Courses offered ==
Around 50+ programmes are offered across seven disciplines. Programmes are offered at the undergraduate and post graduate levels.

The university has six schools in total, each of which are affiliated with their respective institutes in the main campus.

== Student life ==
Carnival is an annual cultural fest with music, dance, fashion, debating, quiz, painting, and photography.

A student team who won the Sustainable Campus Initiative jointly launched by the Emirates Environment Agency Abu Dhabi (EAD) and Borouge in 2014.

== Affiliations ==
The university hosts several program related clubs such as the Student Chapter of IEEE (Institute of Electronics & Electrical Engineers), SAE (Society of Automobile Engineers), ASHRAE (American Society of Heating, Refrigeration and Air conditioning Engineers), ASCE (American Society of Civil Engineers), CIMA (Charted Institute of Management Accountants, and ACCA (Association of Chartered Certified Accountants).

In 2014, the Chartered Institute of Management Accountants (CIMA) and Manipal Academy of Higher Education, Dubai signed an agreement which will allow students to gain CIMA's global certification and title alongside their graduation degree.
