= Ali Saeed Bin Harmal Al Dhaheri =

Emirati businessman (born 1974)

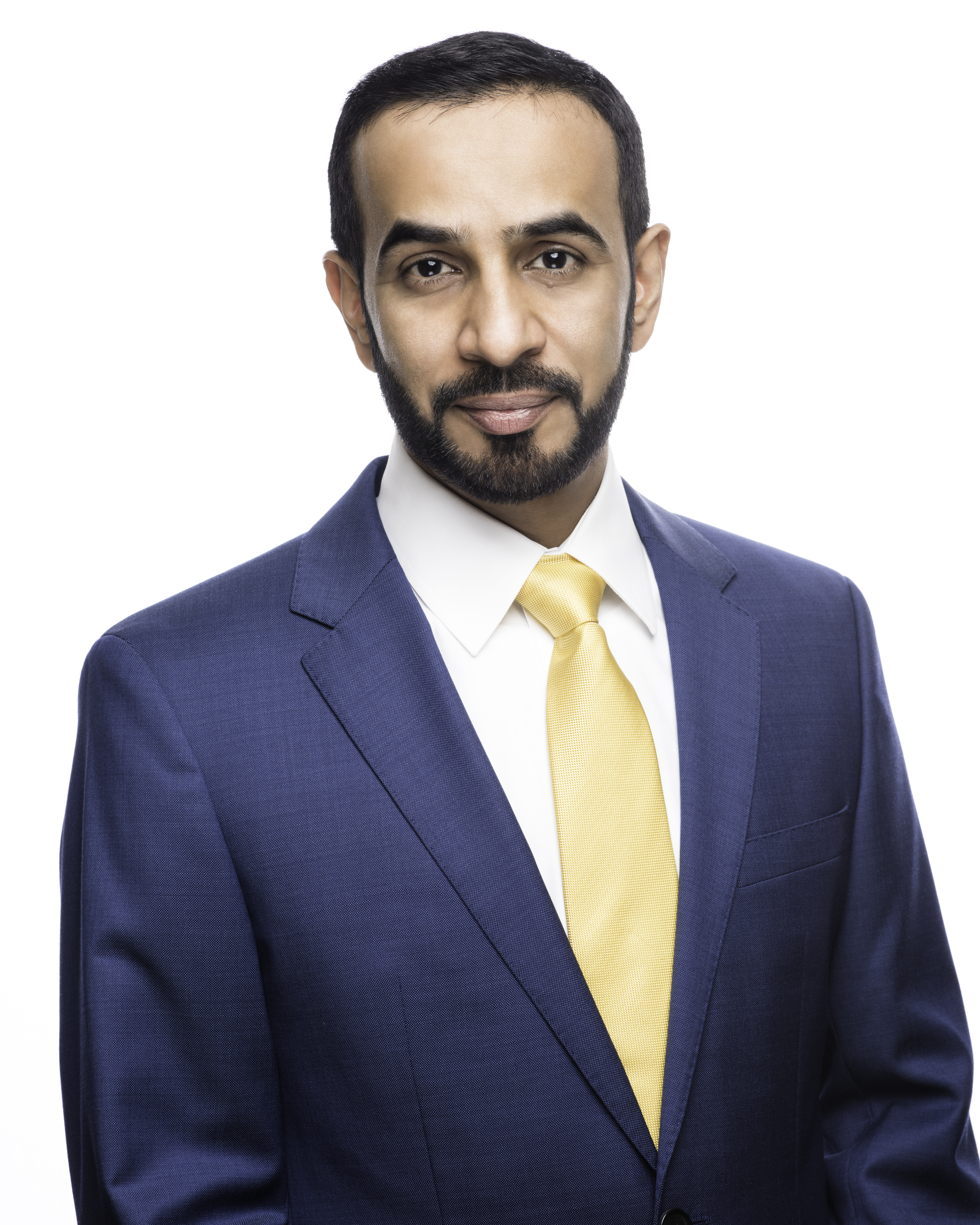
- Dhaheri in 2017
- Born: 1974 (age 51–52)
- Occupation: Businessperson
- Known for: Chairman of Abu Dhabi University; Former Managing Director of ADNEC

Ali Saeed bin Harmal Al Dhaheri (born 1974) is an Emirati businessman and former government official who has been serving as the inaugural and incumbent chairman of Abu Dhabi University since 2003. He had also been the managing director of Abu Dhabi National Exhibition Center (ADNEC). Al Dhaheri is Vice Chairman of the Abu Dhabi Chamber of Commerce and Industry since 2021.

== Education and early career ==
Ali Saeed Bin Harmal Al Dhaheri was born in 1974 in the United Arab Emirates. He finished his MBA at the American University in Washington D.C. Soon after, he established a number of business ventures across different divisions. In 1995, he started working for government on improvement strategy, MICE, and education management and since then has been active with government work and improvement strategy, MICE, and education management. He obtained a PhD in management at the Durham University in the United Kingdom.

== Career ==
From 2006 to 2016 Al Dhaheri managed the Abu Dhabi National Exhibition Center (ADNEC), largest exhibition center in the Middle East. The organization is alternatively known as ADNEC Group. Dhaheri also filled in as a Director of ADCG (UK) Ltd. until November 2016.

Al Dhaheri is the CEO of Abu Dhabi University Holding Company, and Chairman of the Liwa International School which was founded in 1992. He is a member of the board for London ExCel and National Takaful Company and a member from the executive committee for Emirates Foundation.

Al Dhaheri founded Abu Dhabi University in 2003 and serves as its Chairman, as well as Chairman of the Executive Board and, under his leadership, the University obtained international academic accreditation from the Western Association of Schools and Colleges: Senior College and University Commission (WSCUC). He is the Chairman of Al Khawarizmi International College which is Accredited and licensed by the UAE Ministry of Higher Education and Scientific Research (MOHESR) in year 2000.

Al Dhaheri is also the Chairman of Fortune Properties LLC which is a company that specializes in the construction of exclusive educational campuses, associated research facilities, business parks and other facilities. The company's projects take environmental concerns into account. Since July 2021, Al Dhaheri has served as the first Vice Chairman of the Abu Dhabi Chamber of Commerce and Industry.

Ali Saeed Bin Harmal Al Dhaheri is the Chairman of MAGNA Investment, and as an executive, Dhaheri holds 4 appointments at 4 active companies.
