= Commission for Academic Accreditation (United Arab Emirates) =

UAE government agency

- مفوضية الاعتماد الأكاديمي
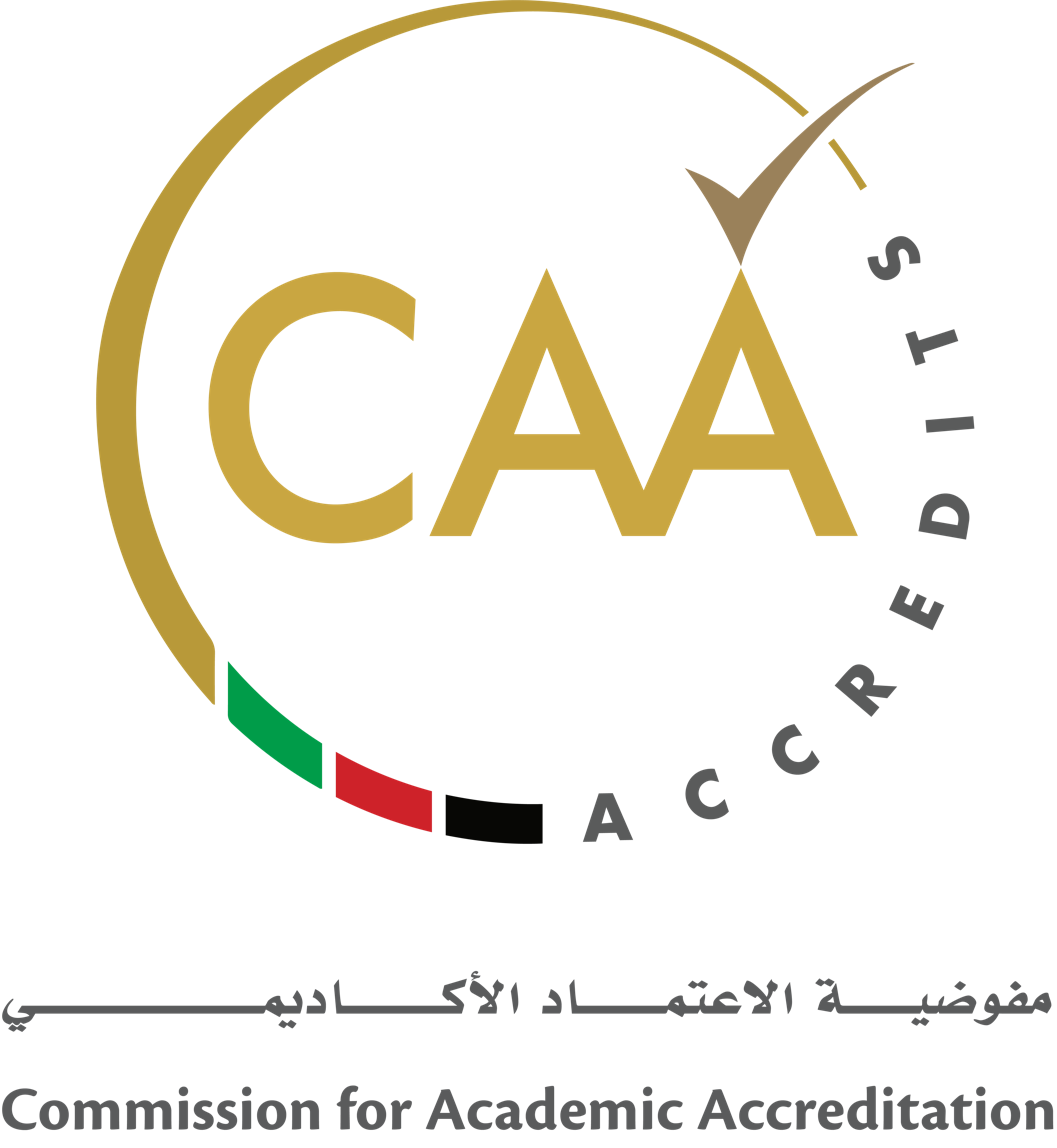

Agency overview
- Jurisdiction: United Arab Emirates
- Headquarters: Abu Dhabi, United Arab Emirates
- Agency executive: Amjad Qandil, Acting Director
- Parent agency: Ministry of Higher Education and Scientific Research
- Website: www.caa.ae

The Commission for Academic Accreditation (CAA) (Arabic: مفوضية الاعتماد الأكاديمي) is the national quality assurance and regulatory agency responsible for evaluation and accreditation of higher educational institutions and universities in the United Arab Emirates. Established in 2000, it comes under the country's Ministry of Higher Education and Scientific Research.

Working collaboratively with relevant national and local authorities in the Emirates, the CAA sets out to safeguard academic standards and to assure and enhance the quality of learning opportunities provided for students in UAE's higher education institutions (HEIs). It undertakes licensure of HEIs in the UAE and accreditation of their award-bearing academic programs. In order to be entered in the National Register and receive Federal Recognition any HEIs offering post-secondary education in the UAE must receive institutional licensure and accreditation of their degree and diploma. CAA accreditation incorporates recognition of Bachelor's degree, Postgraduate Diploma, Master's degree and Doctorate Degree. These Degrees range from levels 6-8 as per the National Qualification Framework of UAE (NQF UAE).

== Mission ==
The Mission of the CAA is: “To work collaboratively with stakeholders to assure quality, effectiveness, and continuous improvement of higher education, safeguard its system, embrace its diversity and foster the quality culture”.

== Commission structure ==
The CAA is associated with the UAE Federal Government's Ministry of Higher Education and Scientific Research (MoHESR) and is based in the UAE's capital city, Abu Dhabi. Its jurisdiction includes all seven of the Emirates of the UAE and overseas campuses of UAE-based higher education institutions. The CAA has number of Commissioners in various fields including business, engineering, computing, sciences, law, health sciences, humanities and arts. Its senior committee is the Council of Commissioners, composed of the executive director and all Commissioners. The Council meets biweekly, and approves all accreditation actions related to HEIs. The CAA is supported by administration staff executives, who are taking care of quality, archiving and logistics. A Strategic Advisory Committee consists of members of representative stakeholder groups in higher education in the UAE. The CAA provides strategic academic advisory support to senior leadership of MoHESR on academic mattes.

== History ==
Originally established in 2000 and associated with Ministry of Higher Education and Scientific Research for the purpose of assuring that private HEIs and programs meet international quality standards, the scope of the CAA's activities was broadened in 2012 to include licensure and accreditation of all HEIs in the country including governmental HEIs. In addition to its licensure and accreditation activities, the commission has responsibility for approval of substantive changes to HEIs and their programs and undertakes academic audits of HEI activities. It also investigates concerns about higher education provision and provides advice, support, and development opportunities for HEIs in line with its Mission.

The CAA published its first Standards for Institutional Licensure and Program Accreditation in 2001. Subsequent revisions and expansions of the Standards included the publication of the e-learning and Distance Learning Standards for Licensure and Accreditation in 2007, the Standards for Licensure and Accreditation Technical and Vocational Education in 2009, and (version 6; 2019) version of the Standards incorporates the e-learning standards in a single, comprehensive document. In 2025, CAA adovpted a new Outcome-Based Evaluation Framework (OEF) aims to enchance the quality of higher education in UAE.

== International recognition and collaboration ==
The commission is a member of relevant organizations such as the Arab Network for Quality Assurance in Higher Education and the International Network for Quality Assurance Agencies in Higher Education, and it is recognized by the World Federation for Medical Education. The commission has established memoranda of understanding for cooperation with various international accreditation agencies such as the Association to Advance Collegiate Schools of Business International, The Accreditation Commission for Education in Nursing, and the Accreditation Council for Pharmacy Education.

== Institutional licensure and program accreditation ==
Institutional licensure and program accreditation are core activities of the CAA. Licensed institutions must demonstrate adherence to outcomes covering all activities across the institution, follow principles of continuous improvement, and provide evidence of achieving student-learning outcomes. HEIs obtain licensure and program accreditation through the submission of an application and supporting documentation to the CAA, which is normally followed by site visits by a Commissioner and a visiting committee of experienced academics (the External Review Team (ERT)) with appropriate international expertise. The ERT reviews institutions and their programs against the expectations of the CAA outcome-based framework for Institutional Licensure and Program Accreditation (2024), Commission for Academic Accreditation, MoE, UAE</ref> for Institutional Licensure and Program Accreditation and international best practices, ERT can place requirements upon the institutions that they must meet in order to be recommended to the CAA Council of Commissioners for institutional licensure and program accreditation. The Framework is differentially applied in the consideration of applications for licensure or for program accreditation.

=== Risk Based Assessment ===
The CAA depending on reviews and site visits plus data submitted by the institution determines the risk and identifies the institution as high confidence, medium confidence, and low confidence.

=== Institutional Licensure ===
Initial licensure is granted for up to three years. It signifies that the institution has a mission appropriate to higher education and possesses the governance structure, by-laws, regulations, policies and procedures, physical and financial resources, educational programs, faculty and other personnel, and quality assurance measures sufficient to accomplish its mission. Renewal of licensure may be granted for a period of two, four, or six years according to a risk-based assessment of the institution.

=== Program Accreditation ===
Initial program accreditation is designed to ensure that a fully developed curriculum and support services are in place. The External Review Team evaluates the program's structure and its constituent courses, and their requirements for specialist faculty and appropriate teaching and learning resources. Initial program accreditation is granted until program graduates its first cohort. Renewal of program accreditation is undertaken after a program has graduated its first cohort of students. An External Review Team evaluates whether the program's anticipated outcomes are being achieved, including the maintenance of academic standards in keeping with international norms, and the nature of the student experience. The periodicity of renewal of accreditation follows the same two, four, or six years cycle as that determined during risk analysis reviews.

== Outcome-based Evaluation Framework (OEF) ==
The Outcome-Based Evaluation Framework (OEF), developed by the MoHESR, sets a new framework for evaluating HEIs. It emphasizes accountability, continuous improvement, and global competitiveness through comprehensive performance metrics such as employment outcomes, learning quality, research impact, industry collaboration, and community engagement. Each institution is measured against clear performance thresholds derived from international standards and local benchmarks, using 24 Key Performance Indicators (KPIs) that comprehensively assess institutional effectiveness.

See also

- List of recognized higher education accreditation organizations
- List of universities and colleges in the United Arab Emirates
