= Dubai route numbering system =

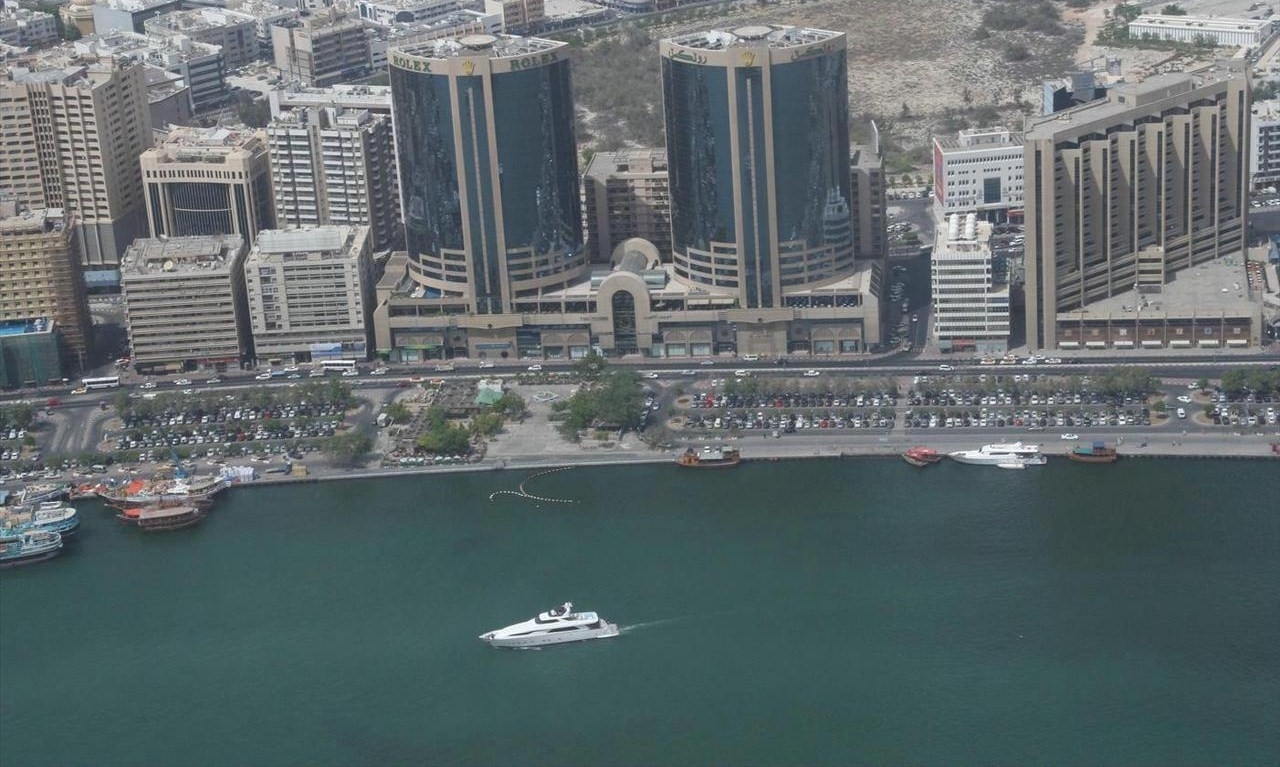
D 85 (Baniyas Road) alongside Dubai Creek in Deira.

The Dubai route numbering system is a network of highways and roads in Dubai, United Arab Emirates that is managed by the Roads and Transport Authority (RTA). The network comprises 6 main highways and several major and minor inter-city and intra-city roads.

== Routes ==
=== E-routes ===
E 44 - Dubai-Hatta Highway sign

Highways connecting Dubai to other emirates are designated Emirates routes or E-routes. They are identified by an emblem of a falcon, the letter E and a two or three digit number. While within city limits, most roads and highways take alternate names, but are consistently identified by their corresponding E-route number. Six E-routes pass through Dubai, connecting the city with other emirates and towns:

- E 11 (Sheikh Zayed Road, Al Ittihad Road)
- E 311 (Sheikh Mohammed Bin Zayed Road (formerly Emirates Road))
- E 611 (Emirates Road (formerly Dubai Bypass Road))
- E 44 (Al Khail Road, Ras Al Khor Road, Al Awir Road, Dubai-Hatta Road, Hatta Highway)
- E 66 (Oud Metha Rd, Dubai-Al Ain Road)
- E 77 (Expo Road/Jebel Ali-Lehbab Road)

The longest of the E-routes is E 11, which extends the length of the UAE's Persian Gulf coast and connects all emirates, with the exception of Al Fujairah.

=== D-routes ===
Jumeirah Road sign

D-routes connect localities within the city of Dubai and are identified by the emblem of a fort, the letter D and a two or three digit number. Considerably shorter in length than the average E-route, D-routes provide an intra-city network of roads and streets. D-routes parallel to UAE's coast along the Persian Gulf are numbered evenly, beginning with D 96; the numbers decrease as the network moves farther from the coast. D-routes perpendicular to the Persian Gulf coast are odd numbered, beginning with D 97, and decrease as the network moves away from the emirate of Sharjah. Some of the D-routes include:

- D 921 (Al Wasl Road; Al Mina Road; Al Khaleej Road, Burj Khalifa Avenue)
- D 591 (Discovery Garden Road)
- D 97 (Amman Street)
- D 96 (Deira Islands Street)
- D 95 (Cairo Street; Baghdad Street)
- D 94(Jumeirah Street; King Salman Bin Abdulaziz Al Saud Street)
- D 93 (Al Wuheida Road; Al Nahda Road; Tunis Street)
- D 92 (Al Wasl Road; Al Mina Road; Al Khaleej Road)
- D 91 (Abu Hail Road; Al Quds St)
- D 90 (Al Satwa Road; Mankhool Road; Al Musallah Road)
- D 89 (Al Maktoum Road; Airport Road; Al Khawaneej Road)
- D 88 (Sheikh Khalifa Bin Zayed Road;Omar Bin Al Khattab Road)
- D 86 (First Al Khail Street; Al Mustaqabal Street
- D 85 (Al Maktoum Road; Baniyas Street)
- D 84 (Al Seef Street)
- D 83 (Al Rebat Street; Tripoli St)
- D 82 (Naif Road; Al Rasheed Road)
- D 81 (Al Riyadh Street)
- D 80 (Salahuddin Road)
- D 79 (Khalid Bin Al Waleed Road; Oud Metha Road)
- D 78 (Abu Baker Al Siddique Road; Umm Hurair Road; Tariq Bin Ziyad Road)
- D 77(Kuwait Street; Manama Street)
- D 75 (Sheikh Rashid Street)
- D 74 (Al Ittihad Road (parallel to E11 (Al Ittihad Road) in Deira)
- D 73 (2nd December St; Al Diyafah Street); Za’abeel Palace Street)
- D 72 (Al Asayel Street)
- D 71 (Al Safa Street; Financial Center Street)
- D 70 (Casablanca Road) (Cargo Village St)
- D 69 (Al Hadiqa Street; Al Meydan Street)
- D 68(Al Khail Street (parallel to E44 (Al Khail St))
- D 67 (Umm Al Sheif Street; Latifa bin Hamdan St)
- D 65 (Al Manara St; Al Marabe'a St; Saih Al Dahal St)
- D 64 (Damascus Street)
- D 63 (Umm Suqeim Street; Al Qudra St)
- D 62 (Al Hadaeq St; Nad Al Hamar Road; Beirut St)
- D 61 (Hessa Street)
- D 59 (Al Jamayel Street)
- D 57 (Al Yalayis Street)
- D 56 (Algeria Street)
- D 55 (Jebel Ali Free Zone Street)
- D 54 (Sheikh Zayed Bin Hamdan Al Nahyan Road (formerly Academic City Road))
- D 53 (Al Maktoum Airport Street)
- D 50 (Al Amardi Street)
- D 42 (Saih Al Salam Street)
- D 40 (Margham Street)
- D 30(Hatta Street)

=== Major roads ===
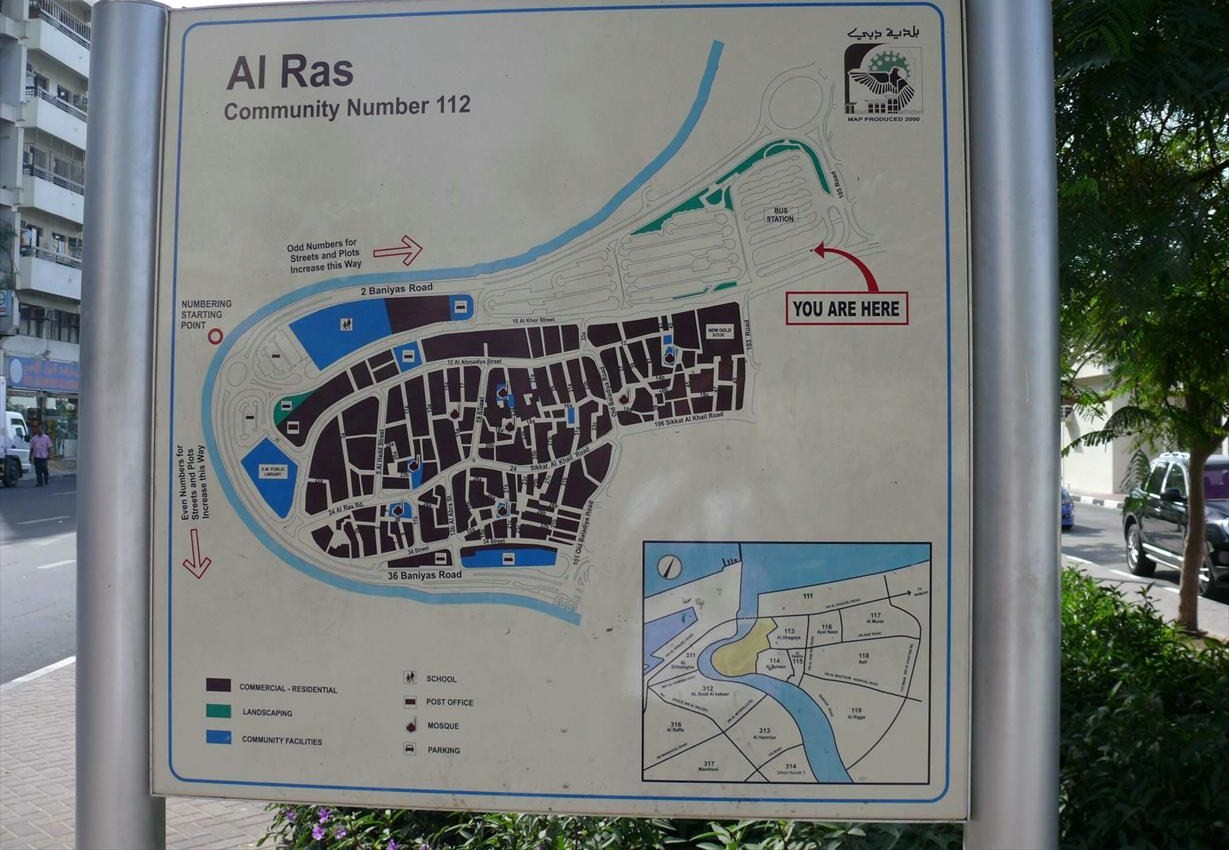
Major roads and streets in the Al Ras locality in Deira.

Major roads typically surround a community or locality within the city and are addressed by a name and a three digit identification number. Streets within a locality are identified with a two digit number. Street numbers are repeated within each locality with odd numbers being vertical streets, and even numbers being horizontal streets.

=== Debated roads ===
Some D-routes are debated by the locals when they saw outdated or incorrect signage which showed routes that are not existing, which are D52, D521, D631, D60, D58, D76, D87, D98, D99 and some others

== See also ==
- List of roads in Dubai
