= D 90 road (United Arab Emirates) =

Road in the United Arab Emirates

D 90
- د ٩٠

Route information
- Length: 7.4 km (4.6 mi)

Major junctions
- North end: Al Enjaaz St
- D 75 (Sheikh Rashid Road) D 73 (2nd December Street) D 71 (Al Safa Street)
- South end: D84 (Al Seef St)

Location
- Country: United Arab Emirates
- Major cities: Dubai

Highway system
- Transport in the United Arab Emirates; Roads in Dubai

D 90 (Arabic: د ٩٠), also known as Al Satwa Road, Al Multaqa Street or Sheikh Sabah Al Ahmad Al Jaber Al Sabah Street is a route in Dubai, United Arab Emirates. The road begins in the old Al Bastakiya area of Bur Dubai and runs roughly parallel to D 92 and D 94. The road was referred to as Al Mankhool Road when passing through the locality of Al Mankhool until 2020, when the road was renamed to Sheikh Sabah Al Ahmad Al Jaber Al Sabah Street, in memory of the former Kuwaiti emir. The road passes through the locality of Al Satwa and ends in the locality of Al Safa. The street name Al Mussallah Road was transferred to D 89, from Corniche Street/D85 (below Infinity Bridge) until D 80.

Important landmarks along D 90 include Al Bastakiya, Al Souk Al Kabir, Jumbo Electronics, Al Khaleej Centre, the Majestic Hotel and the Trade Core Business Center. Ramada Hotel closed down in 2017. Metro stop: Green Line, Al Fahidi.
