= E 44 road (United Arab Emirates) =

Road in the United Arab Emirates

E 44
- إ ٤٤
- Al Khail Road, Ras Al Khor Road, Al Aweer Road, Dubai-Hatta Highway
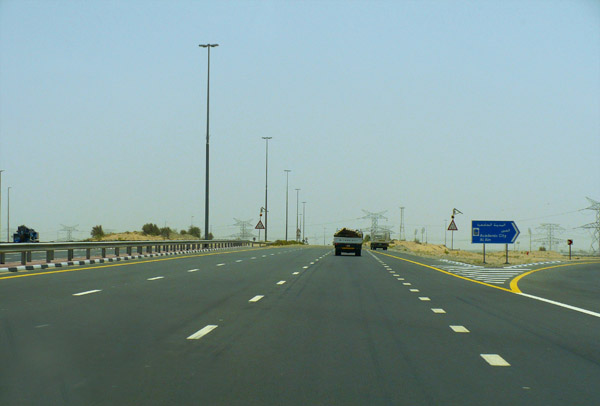
- Dubai-Hatta Highway (E 44)

Route information
- Length: 118 km (73 mi)

Dubai - Al Madam Segment
- East end: E 311 - Mohammed bin Zayed Road
- Major intersections: D 61 - Hessa Street; D 63 - Umm Suqeim Street; D 69 - Al Meydan Street; D 68 - Al Khail Street; D 71 - Financial Center Street; E 66 - Oud Maitha Street/Dubai Al Ain Road; D 62 - Nad Al Hammar Street; E 311 - Mohammed bin Zayed Road; E 611 - Emirates Bypass Road; E 77 - Jabal Ali - Lehbab Road; E 55 - Meliha - Al Madam Road; E 84 - Khalifa bin Zayed Road
- West end: Al Rawdah Border Crossing

Masfout - Hatta Segment
- East end: Masfout Border Crossing
- Major intersections: E 64 - Al Watan Road; D 30 - Hatta Roundabout
- West end: Hatta Border Crossing

Location
- Country: United Arab Emirates
- Major cities: Dubai, Al Aweer, Al-Lehbab, Hatta

Highway system
- Transport in the United Arab Emirates; Roads in Dubai

E 44 (Arabic: إ ٤٤) is one of the main roads of the United Arab Emirates (UAE). The road connects the city of Dubai to the town of Hatta, an exclave of the emirate of Dubai. E 44 assumes multiple names; in Dubai, the road is named Al Khail Road, between E 311 and D 68, Ras al Khor Road between D 68 and E 311, Al Aweer Road between E 311 and E 77, and Dubai-Hatta Highway for the rest of the road. E 44 is disconnected in Al Madam by Al Rawdah region of Oman; the road reconnects in Masfout, runs to Hatta and ends in at Hatta Border Crossing . In February 2024, the Dubai Roads and Transport Authority (RTA) awarded a contract worth Dh700 million for significant upgrades on Al Khail Road. This project entails the construction of bridges totaling 3,300 meters in length and road enhancements over a distance of 6,820 meters across seven locations, including Zabeel, Meydan, Al Quoz 1, Ghadeer Al Tair, and Jumeirah Village Circle.

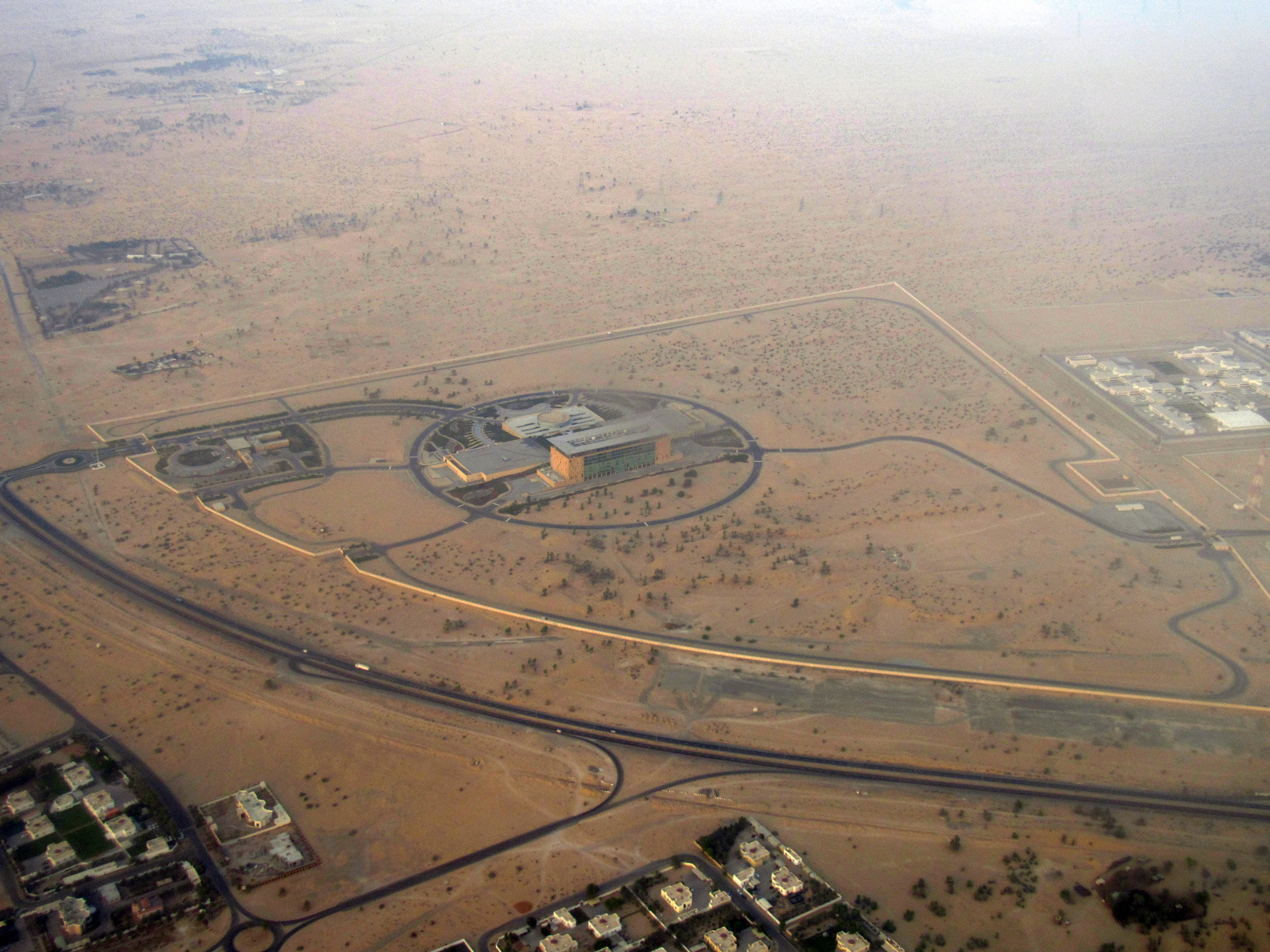
Aerial view of the highway

== Exit List ==
Emirate	Location	km	mi	Exit	Destinations	Notes
Dubai	Dubai			8	E 311 (Sheikh Mohammed bin Zayed Road) – Abu Dhabi, Sharjah	
Dubai	Dubai			10	Jumeira Village 1 Street	
Dubai	Dubai			11	Jumeira Village 2 Street	
Dubai	Dubai			12	D 61 (Hessa Street) – Jumeira, Dubailand	
Dubai	Dubai			16	D 63 (Umm Suqueim Street) – Jumeira, Al Barsha, Madinat Al Qudra	
Dubai	Dubai			18	D 65 (Al Mara'bea Street) – Jumeira, Al Qouz Industrial	
Dubai	Dubai			22	D 67 west (Latifa bint Hamdan Street) – Jumeira, Al Qouz Industrial	
Dubai	Dubai			25	D 69 (Al Meydan Street, Al Hadiqa Street) – Jumeira; D 72 north (Al Asayel Street) – Za'abeel	
Dubai	Dubai			27	D 68 north (Al Khail Street) – Deira	
Dubai	Dubai			28	D 71 west (Financial Centre Street) – Jumeira; The Dubai Mall, Burj Khalifa	
Dubai	Dubai			30	E 66 (Dubai-Al Ain Road, Oud Maitha Road) – Bur Dubai, Al Ain	
Dubai	Dubai			31	Aden Street, Bu Kadra	
Dubai	Dubai			32	Ras Al Khor Industrial 1,2	
Dubai	Dubai			33	Dubai Creek Harbour, Creek Avenue Street	
Dubai	Dubai			35	D 62 (Nadd Al Hamar Street) – Al Rashidiya, Ras Al Khor Industrial 2	
Dubai	Dubai			38	E 311 (Sheikh Mohammed bin Zayed Road) – Abu Dhabi, Sharjah; Ras Al Khor Industrial 3 Warsan, International City	
Dubai	Dubai			42	E 611 south (Emirates Road) – Abu Dhabi	
Dubai	Dubai			43	E 611 north (Emirates Road) – Sharjah,Al Awir	
Dubai	Dubai	1.000 mi = 1.609 km; 1.000 km = 0.621 mi				

== See also ==
- Dubai Safari Park
