= D 88 road (United Arab Emirates) =

Road in the United Arab Emirates

D 88
- د ٨٨

Location
- Country: United Arab Emirates
- Major cities: Dubai

Highway system
- Transport in the United Arab Emirates; Roads in Dubai

D 88 (also known as Sheikh Khalifa Bin Zayed Road from the Bur Dubai side and Omar Bin Al Khattab Road from the Deira side) is a road in Dubai, United Arab Emirates.

== See also ==
- Dubai route numbering system
