= Ushi Sato =

Filipino fashion designer

- Born: 1987 or 1988 (age 38–39); Cotabato, Philippines
- Education: Fashion Institute of the Philippines
- Known for: Founder of Ushisato fashion label and The Shades and the Scarf blog

Ushi Sato is a Filipino fashion designer and blogger from Cotabato and the founder of the namesake fashion label Ushisato.

== Early life and education ==
Ushi Sato was born in Cotabato province in 1987 or 1988. Sato comes from a Filipino-Japanese family and is the youngest of five children. His parents were tailors with his mother specializing in dresses and his father making denims. He initially attended a nursing school before moving to the Fashion Institute of the Philippines to study fashion design.

== Career ==
Before establishing wider recognition as a designer, Ushi Sato moved from the Philippines to Dubai in the United Arab Emirates in 2009, where he worked as an in-house designer for a shop in Jumeirah and later worked in retail as a merchandiser and buyer. He also started a blog, The Shades and the Scarf around this time which gained a significant readership in the Middle East.

He stayed in Dubai for 15 years and studied couture fashion under his mentor and fellow Filipino designer Albert Andrada. Sato described his design style as "minimalist", but also stated he likes to "mix and match" designs like something "old with new", "cheap and pricey", depending on his own mood.

In 2023, Ushi Sato was included in Preview magazine's Creative 25 list under the fashion category.

== Works ==
=== Kutawatu collection ===
In 2025, Ushi Sato presented the Kutawatu collection, which was inspired by the history and cultural heritage of Cotabato. He incorporated elements such as the inaul from Maguindanao, tennun yakan from Basilan. The collection was also associated with Ushi Sato's participation in Precious of Malaysia Cultural Fashion Week in Kuala Lumpur. He was given the Uplifting Traditional Design recognition for Kutawatu.

=== Notable clients ===
Manila Luzon, a drag queen and television personality, wore an art deco-inspired gown by Ushi Sato at the 2023 Asian Academy Creative Awards, where Luzon was named a Fashion Industry Best Dressed Award recipient. Other people noted to have worn Sato's designs include: Sue Ramirez at Star Magic Hot Summer, Dimples Romana at the Star Magical Christmas Party, and Jessica Yang at the 2024 Mega Fashion Awards.
