= E 66 road (United Arab Emirates) =

Road in the United Arab Emirates

E 66
- إ ٦٦
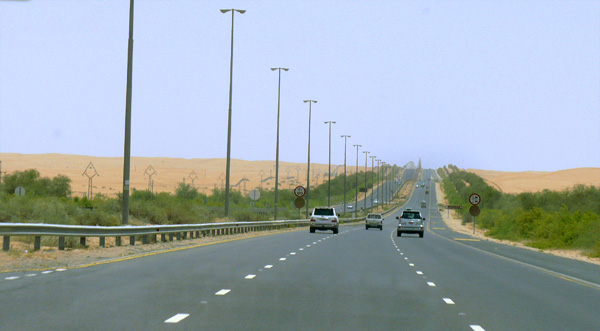
- E 66 becomes Dubai – Al Ain Road south of Dubai

Route information
- Length: 127.7 km (79.3 mi)

Major junctions
- E 44 (Ras Al Khor Road); E 311 (Sheikh Mohammad Bin Zayed Road); E 611 (Emirates Road); E 77

Location
- Country: United Arab Emirates
- Major cities: Dubai, Al Ain

Highway system
- Transport in the United Arab Emirates; Roads in Dubai

E 66 (Arabic: إ ٦٦) is a road in the United Arab Emirates. The road connects the city of Dubai to the interior city of Al Ain in the Eastern Region of the Emirate of Abu Dhabi. E 66 runs roughly perpendicular to E 11 (Sheikh Zayed Road) and E 311 (Sheikh Mohammad Bin Zayed Road Road). Beginning in the locality of Oud Metha, E 11 progresses southward towards the interior. The road is referred to as the "Dubai-Al Ain Road", after its intersection with Emirates Road south of the city of Dubai, and "Tahnoun Bin Mohammad Al Nahyan Road", after Sheikh Tahnoun, the Ruler's Representative in the Eastern Region of Abu Dhabi.

== Description ==
It goes through the towns of Al-Faqa' (shared by the Emirates of Abu Dhabi and Dubai) and Al-Hayer, and connects to Al Madam in the Emirate of Sharjah via Al-Shwaib. Once in Al Ain, a city that shares a border with Oman, the road becomes Emirates Street and later, Bani Yas Road.

=== Exits (From Dubai) ===
Emirate	Location	km	mi	Exit	Destinations	Notes
Dubai	Zaa'beel			1	E 11 north (Sheikh Rashid Road) – Sharjah	
Dubai	Zaa'beel			3A	D 72 south (Al Asayel Street) – Al Qouz, Business Bay	
Dubai	Zaa'beel			3B	D 68 north (Al Khail Street) – Deira; E 44 south (Al Khail Road) – Jabal Ali, Abu Dhabi; D 73 west (Zaa'beel Palace Street) – Al Satwa	
Dubai	Zaa'beel			5	Dubai Design District	
Dubai	Nadd Al Shiba			6	E 44 (Ras Al Khor Road) – Jabal Ali, Al Awir, Hatta; D 77 south (Al Meydan Street) – Al Qouz, Jumeira	
Dubai	Nadd Al Shiba			10	Nadd Al Shiba 1,2	
Dubai	Nadd Al Shiba			12	Al Abjar Street, Wadi Al Safa 3	
Dubai	Nadd Al Shiba			14	E 311 (Sheikh Mohammed bin Zayed Road) – Abu Dhabi, Sharjah	
Dubai	Al Rowaiyah			16	D 54 (Sheikh Zayed bin Hamdan Al Nahyan Road) – Jabal Ali, Warsan, Al Khawaneej; Dubai Silicon Oasis, Academic City	
Dubai	Al Rowaiyah			18	E 611 (Emirates Road) – Abu Dhabi, Sharjah; Al Rowaiyah, Dubai Outlet Mall	
Dubai	Al Rowaiyah	1.000 mi = 1.609 km; 1.000 km = 0.621 mi: Tolled				

=== Exits (To Dubai) ===
Emirate	Location	km	mi	Exit	Destinations	Notes
Dubai	Madinat Hind			30	E 77 north (Lahbab Road) – Lahbab, Hatta	
Dubai	Madinat Hind			29	E 77 west (Lahbab Road) – Jabal Ali	
Dubai	Madinat Hind			26	Madinat Hind	
Dubai	Al Rowaiyah			18	Al Rowaiyah 3	
Dubai	Al Rowaiyah			17	E 611 (Emirates Road) – Sharjah, Abu Dhabi	
Dubai	Al Rowaiyah			16	D 54 (Sheikh Zayed bin Hamdan Al Nahyan Road) – Jabal Ali, Warsan, Al Khawaneej; Dubai Silicon Oasis, Academic City; E 311 (Sheikh Mohammed bin Zayed Road) – Abu Dhabi, Sharjah	
Dubai	Nadd Al Shiba			12	D 62 (Nadd Al Hamar Road) – Ras Al Khor, Nadd Al Hamar, Al Rashidiya, Al Qusais; Nadd Al Shiba 1-4	
Dubai	Nadd Al Shiba			12	D 77 south (Al Meydan Street) – Al Qouz, Jumeira; D 77 north (Manama Street) – Ras Al Khor; E 44 (Ras Al Khor Road) – Jabal Ali, Al Awir, Hatta	
Dubai	Za'abeel			3A	D 68 south (Al Khail Street) – Deira	
Dubai	Za'abeel			3B	E 44 south (Al Khail Road) – Jabal Ali, Abu Dhabi; D 73 west (Zaa'beel Palace Street) – Al Satwa	
Dubai	Za'abeel			3C	Al Nouras Street	
Dubai	Za'abeel			2	Latifa Hospital Street	
Dubai	Za'abeel			1A	D 75 west (Sheikh Rashid Street) – Bur Dubai, Al Karama; D 86 south (Al Mustaqbal Street) – Za'abeel; E 11 south (Sheikh Zayed Road) – Abu Dhabi	
Dubai	Za'abeel			1B	E 11 north (Sheikh Rashid Road) – Sharjah	
Dubai	1.000 mi = 1.609 km; 1.000 km = 0.621 mi					

== History ==
In 2010, authorities in the Emirate of Abu Dhabi revamped the road in two phases. The first phase contained 3 lanes in each direction, and stretched 23 km (14 miles) from Al-Towayya to Al-Masaken. The second phase contained 4 lanes in each direction, and stretched 42 km (26 miles) from Al-Masaken to Al-Faqa'. In November 2018, under the directives of Sheikh Mohamed bin Zayed Al Nahyan, the road was renamed after Sheikh Tahnoun.

In 2022, authorities undertook a project worth $ 544.9 million or AED 2 billion to improve the traffic flow in Dubai. Spanning 17 km (11 miles) from the intersection with the road to Ras Al-Khor to the intersection with the Emirates Road, the highway was widened from 3 lanes on each side to 6 lanes on each side, or 12 lanes in total, and 6 main interchanges were built. The interchanges stretch for 11.5 km (7.1 miles), and have ramps and bridges. This part of the highway was opened by Sheikh Hamdan bin Mohammed Al Maktoum on Sunday the 29th of May.

== See also ==
- List of roads in Dubai
