= Al Faqa =

Village in Abu Dhabi and Dubai

Al Faqa Al-Faqaʿ (ٱلْفَقَع)
- Village
- Location of Al Faqa in the UAE Location of Al Faqa in the region of the Persian Gulf Al Faqa (West and Central Asia)
- Coordinates: 24°42′48″N 55°37′23″E
- Country: United Arab Emirates
- Emirate: Abu Dhabi and Dubai
- Municipal region (Abu Dhabi): Al-Ain

Government
  - Type: Absolute monarchy
  - Sheikh: Mohamed bin Zayed Al Nahyan (Abu Dhabi); Mohammed bin Rashid Al Maktoum (Dubai)
  - Ruler's Representative of the Eastern Region of the Emirate of Abu Dhabi: Tahnoun bin Mohammed Al Nahyan

Population (2015)
  - Total: 2,291
- Time zone: UTC+4 (UAE Standard Time)

Al Faqa (Arabic: ٱلْفَقَع, romanized: Al-Faqaʿ) is a village that sits across the border of the Emirate of Dubai and the Eastern Region of the Emirate of Abu Dhabi, United Arab Emirates. It is located on the highway from Dubai to Al Ain and has a Dubai police station. As of 2015, the Dubai side of the village has a population of 370, while the Al Ain side has 1,921 residents, for an overall population of 2,291.

== See also ==
- Arabian Desert
- Eastern Arabia
- Swaihan
