= Emirates City =

Emirati urban development

- Company type: Free hold area
- Headquarters: Ajman, United Arab Emirates
- Owner: R-Holding Group
- Website: rholding.com

Emirates City is a residential and commercial development that is under development. The project is located in the Ajman Emirate in the United Arab Emirates and is expected to cost $4.1 billion US. This development is situated along the Emirates Road and across from Humaid City. There are 92 mixed residential and commercial towers in this development ranging from 20 to 60 floors.

Emirates City is situated on the Sheikh Mohammed Bin Zayed Road (SMBZ Road) which allows the project to link to the Emirates of Dubai, Abu Dhabi, Sharjah, Ajman, Umm Al Quwain, and Ras Al Khaimah by a single stretch of a highway.

FEWA has built a dedicated Electric Sub-Station for Emirates City and Helio Area which become operational in March 2019.
