= D90 =

D90 may refer to:

- Nikon D90, 12.3 megapixel DSLR camera
- D 90 road (United Arab Emirates)
- HMS Southampton (D90), a Royal Navy Type 42 destroyer
- HMS Speaker (D90), a Royal Navy escort aircraft carrier
- Grünfeld Defence, Encyclopaedia of Chess Openings code
- TDK D90 Cassette
- Maxus D90, a mid-size SUV
