= Humaid City =

Coordinates: 24.466°N 54.359°E

Al Humaid City
- Company type: Freehold area
- Headquarters: Ajman, United Arab Emirates
- Owner: Ajman Government

Al Humaid City is a residential and commercial development being created in Ajman Emirate in the United Arab Emirates. This development is situated along the Emirates Road and across from Emirates City. There are 69 residential towers in this development; these towers range from 25 to 35 stories.

== See also ==
- Emirates City
- Marmooka City
- Mermaid City
