= Mansoor bin Tahnoon Al Nahayan =

Dr. Mansoor Bin Tahnoon Al Nahyan is an academic in political science, a medical practitioner, and a pilot.

== Biography ==
Born in Al Ain in 1973, Dr. Mansoor began his career in the United Arab Emirates Armed Forces, reaching the rank of Lieutenant Colonel. From 1990 to 2011, he earned many qualifications including operational, eleFFment and section lead fighter pilot, operational helicopter pilot, ATPL and ATPL(H). In 2011, Dr. Mansoor became a qualified instructor pilot and examiner.

At the age of 18, Dr. Mansoor was appointed chairman of the United Arab Emirates Shooting Association, and has participated in many competitions representing the UAE.

In 1997, Dr. Mansoor graduated with a medical degree from United Arab Emirates University. Later in 1999, he received a master's degree in Public Health and Health Administration (MPH) from the Harvard School of Public Health.

From 1997 to 2000, Dr. Mansoor was the chairman of the Emirates Medical Association. Since his graduation from medical school, Dr. Mansoor has, from time to time, worked as a physician in both general surgery and general medicine at the Al Ain Hospital.

In 2000, he gained a second master's degree in Public Administration (MPA) from the Harvard Kennedy School. He then went on to receive a Masters of Arts in Law and Diplomacy (MALD) from the Fletcher School of Law and Diplomacy in 2001. In 2009, Dr. Mansoor successfully completed his PhD in International Relations & Security Studies from Fletcher School of Law and Diplomacy.

He has also worked on special governmental projects. In 2001, he was chosen as one of the five members of the UN mission to Pakistan and Afghanistan, after the fall of the Taliban government, which was headed by Al Akhdar Ibrahimi.

Since 2010, Dr. Mansoor has been a visiting professor of Political Science at the American University of Sharjah (AUS) where he lectures on two courses: Negotiation and Conflict Management; and South West Asia Studies – Modern History and Politics.

Dr. Mansoor has published a series of articles in Gulf News, one of the UAE's oldest English language newspapers, and the Arabic Al Bayan newspaper. These articles cover a variety of political topics in the Arab world and South West Asia. In 2016, he published his first book entitled ‘Karachi in the Twenty First Century – Political, Social, Economic and Security Dimensions’.
