= D73 =

D73 may refer to:

- D 73 road (United Arab Emirates), a road in Dubai connecting Jumeirah and running south-eastward perpendicular to D 94
- HMS Pursuer (D73), a 1942 Bogue-class aircraft carrier
- Neo-Grünfeld Defence, Encyclopaedia of Chess Openings code
