= D94 =

D94 may refer to:

- D 94 road (United Arab Emirates)
- HMS Activity (D94), a British Royal Navy escort carrier
