= D 92 road (United Arab Emirates) =

Road in Dubai, United Arab Emirates

D 92
- د ٩٢
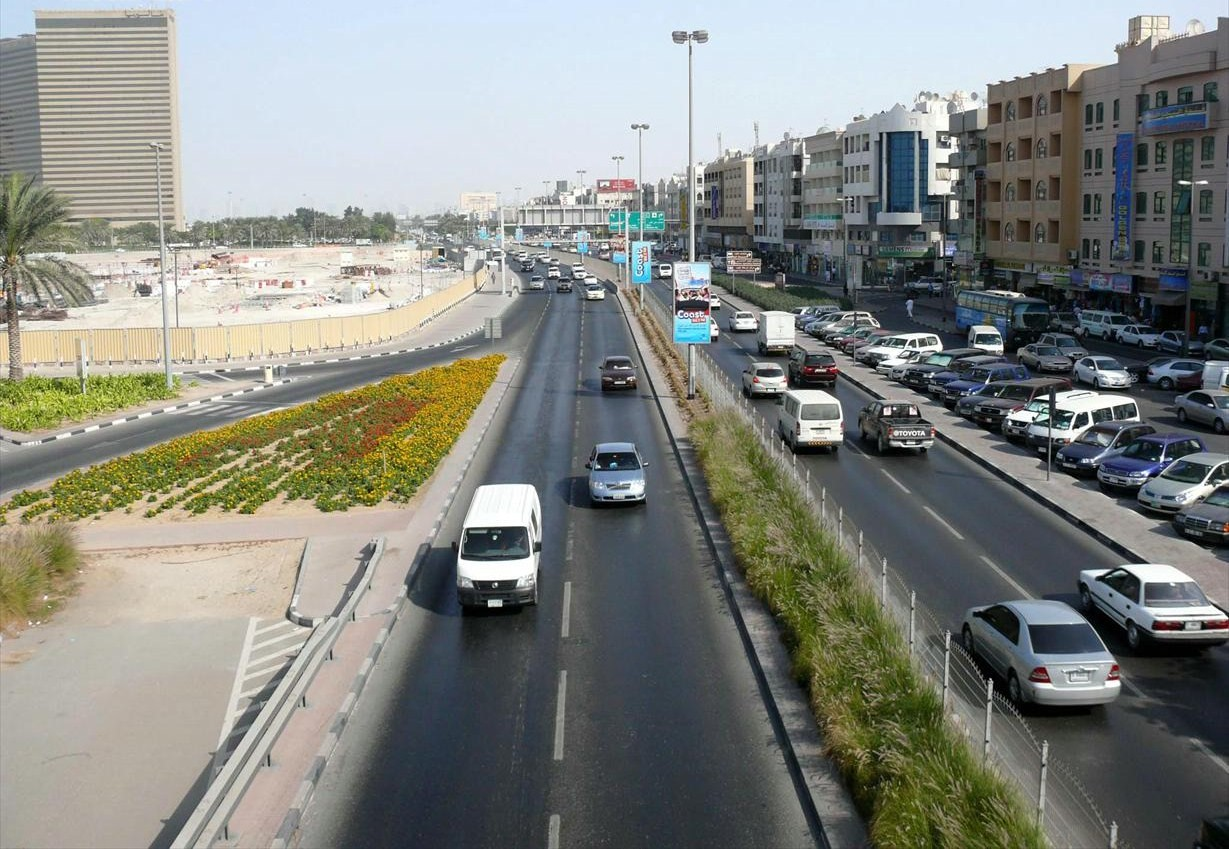
- Al Khaleej Road in Deira

Route information
- Length: 26.1 km (16.2 mi)

Major junctions
- D 85 (Baniyas Road) D 89 (Al Maktoum Road); D 75 (Sheikh Rashid Road); D 73 (Al Dhiyafa Road) D 71 (Al Safa Street), Al Hadiqa Street, D 63 (Umm Suqeim Street)

Location
- Country: United Arab Emirates
- Major cities: Dubai

Highway system
- Transport in the United Arab Emirates; Roads in Dubai

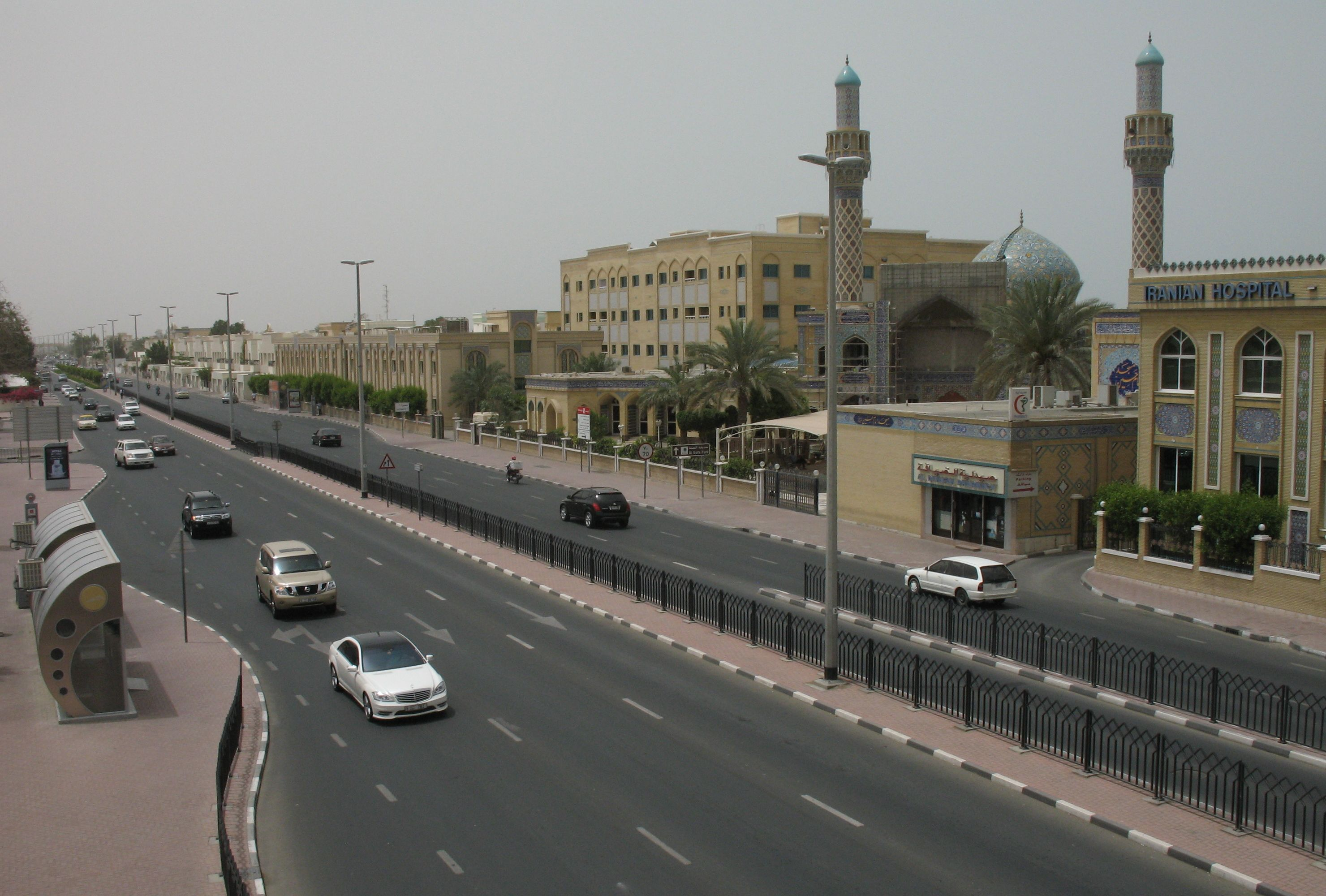
Al Wasl Rd.

D 92, (Arabic: د ٩٢) also known as Al Khaleej Road, Al Mina Road or Al Wasl Road, is a road in Dubai, United Arab Emirates. Beginning in the locality of Al Mamzar, D 92 progresses south-westward, past Deira, Al Shindagha, Port Rashid and Bur Dubai. D 92 then runs parallel to D 94 (Jumeirah Road) and D 90 (Satwa Road) before terminating at a junction with Umm Suqeim Street in Umm Suqeim. The road, which passes through Al Shindagha Tunnel, provides access to Bur Dubai.

Important landmarks located along D 92 include the Dubai Gold Souk, Al Shindagha Tunnel, Falcon Roundabout, Iranian Consulate, American School of Dubai, Al Wasl Police Station, Safa Park and Dubai Police Academy.
