= D 73 road (United Arab Emirates) =

Road in the United Arab Emirates

D 73
- د ٧٣
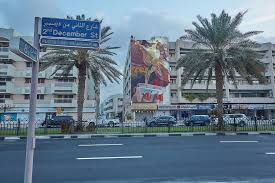
- Signage of 2nd December Street in Al Satwa

Route information
- Length: 8.2 km (5.1 mi)

Major junctions
- West end: D 94 (Jumeirah Road)
- D 92 (Al Wasl Road) D 90 (Satwa Road); E 11 (Sheikh Zayed Road) D 75 (Al Qutaeyat Road)
- East end: E 66 (Oud Metha Road)

Location
- Country: United Arab Emirates
- Major cities: Dubai

Highway system
- Transport in the United Arab Emirates; Roads in Dubai

D 73 (Arabic: د ٧٣), also known as 2nd December Street or Zabeel Palace Street, is a road in Dubai, United Arab Emirates. The road originates in Jumeirah, running south-eastward perpendicular to D 94 (Jumeirah Road). D 73 borders the localities of Al Jafilia and Satwa. The road's intersection with E 11 (Sheikh Zayed Road) near Zabeel forms the Trade Centre Roundabout.

Important landmarks along the D 73 route include Union House, Jumeirah Rotana Hotel, Rydges Plaza, The Monarch Dubai, Etisalat Tower 2 and the Dubai World Trade Centre.
