= Warisan =

Warsan ورسان
- Community
- Interactive map of Warsan
- Coordinates: 25.162687°N 55.422592°E
- Country: United Arab Emirates
- Emirate: Dubai
- City: Dubai
- Boroughs: List: Warsan 1; Warsan 2; Warsan 3; Warsan 4

Area
  - Total: 17.1 km^{2} (6.6 sq mi)

Population (2000)
  - Total: 1,421
  - Density: 83.1/km^{2} (215/sq mi)

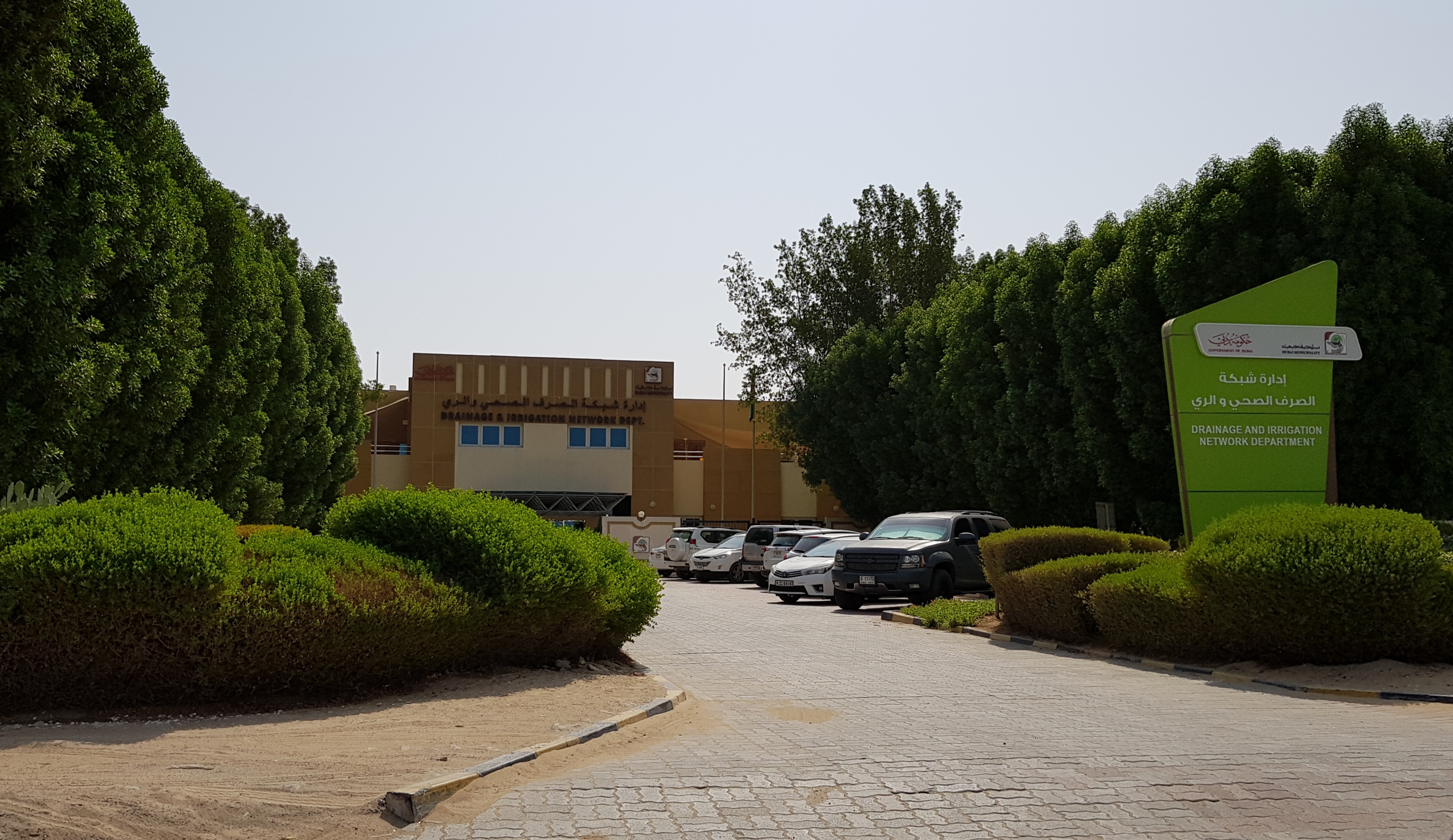
Water treatment plant in Warsan

Warsan or Warisan (Arabic: ورسان) is a locality in Dubai, United Arab Emirates (UAE). Warsan is an industrial neighbourhood of Dubai, bordering Al Warqaa to the north and Nad Al Sheba to the west. The community is sparsely populated and is predominantly industrial, with the Dubai Sewage and Treatment Plant located in it. The new development, Dubai International City, will occupy much of the community. Warsan is bounded to the north by route E 44 (Al Awir Road) and to the west by route E 311 (Emirates Road).

== Communities ==
Warsan is subdivided and grouped into four communities. Two of which are envisioned to have Dubai metro stations around 2029-2030:

Community Name	Coverage
Warsan 1	International City Phase 1; Souq Warsan; Warsan Lake; Dragon Mart 1 & 2; Dubai Textile City
Warsan 2	Al Aweer Sewage Treatment Plant; Al Aweer Power Station; Desert Palm Polo Club
Warsan 3	Building Materials Mall; Plant Souq; Bird and Pet Market
Warsan 4	International City Phases 2 & 3
