= Jumeirah Archaeological Site =

Archaeological site in the UAE

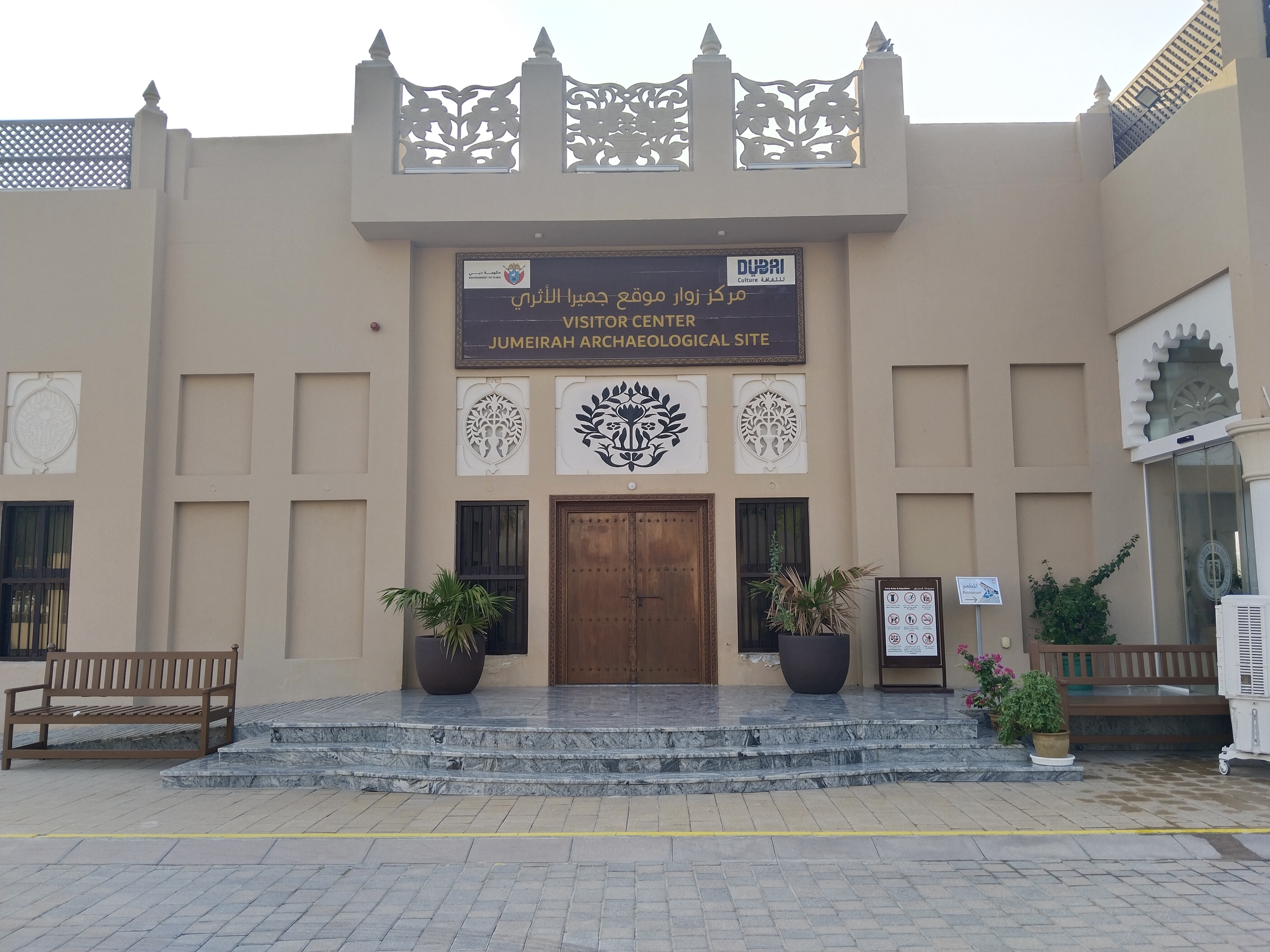
- Jumeirah Archaeological Site Office and Exhibition Building

- Location in the UAE Jumeirah Archaeological Site (Middle East) Jumeirah Archaeological Site (Asia)
- 25.19679°N 55.24180°E
- Location: Dubai, the U.A.E.

Site notes
- Area: Approximately 80,000 m^{2} (8.0 ha; 20 acres)
- Discovered: 1969

The Jumeirah Archaeological Site is a site which dates back to the Abbasid period in the 10th century CE, in the district of Jumeirah in the city of Dubai, the United Arab Emirates. It was first excavated in 1969 by Dimitri Baramki, with different ancient items including architectural and decorative findings, ranging from a mosque, caravanserai, (Note: The purpose of the caravanserai building is debated.) and residential houses to glazed pottery jars and plateware, bronze coins, glass and stone artefacts. It is owned and managed by Dubai Culture & Arts Authority.

== Overview ==
Archaeological excavations at the site, which was discovered in 1969, demonstrate that the area was inhabited as far back as the Abbasid era, approximately in the 10th century CE. Measuring about 80,000 m^{2} (860,000 sq ft), the site lays along a caravan route linking India and China to Oman and Iraq.

== Gallery ==
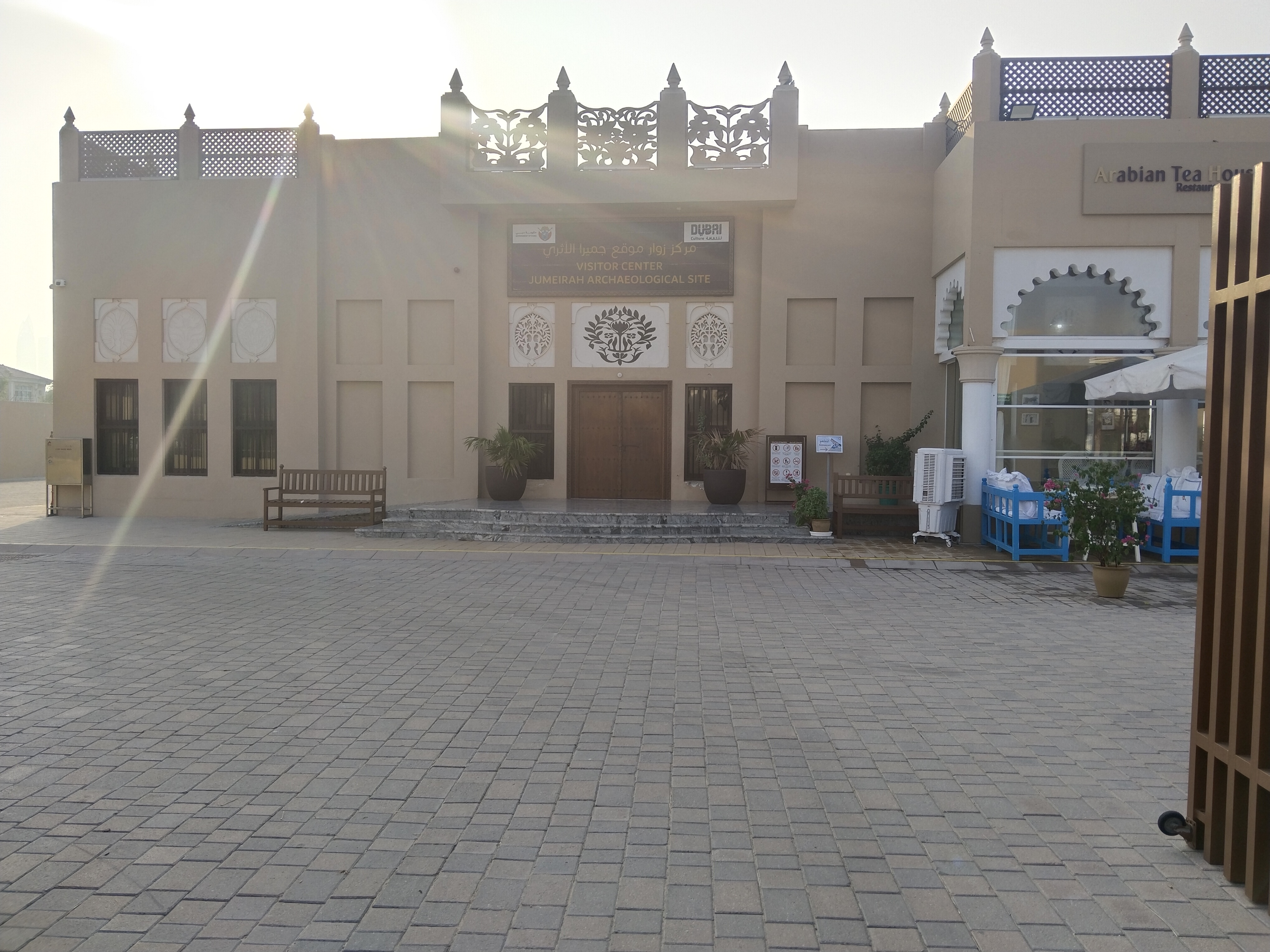
Visitor Centre

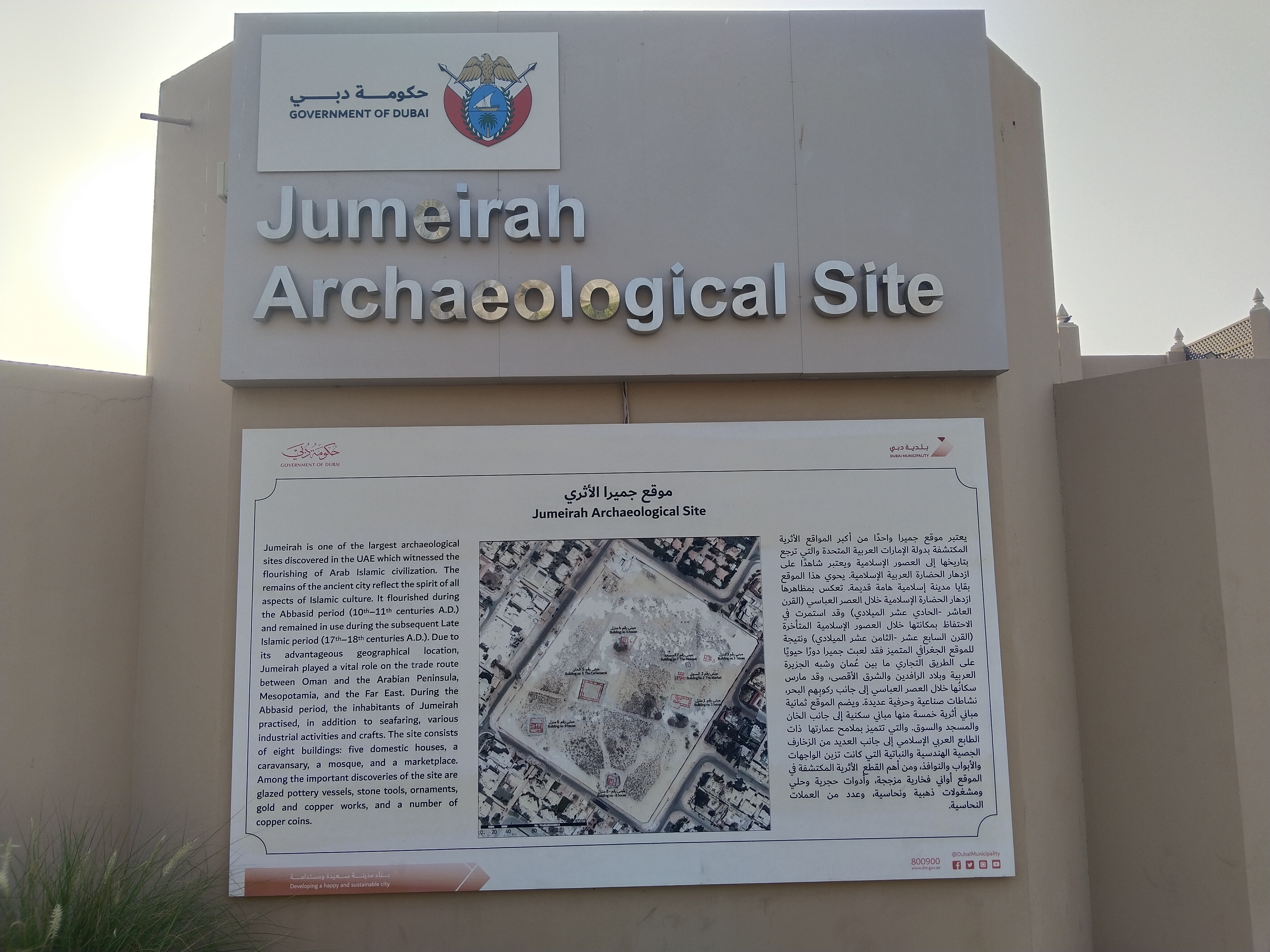
Entrance (Left side)

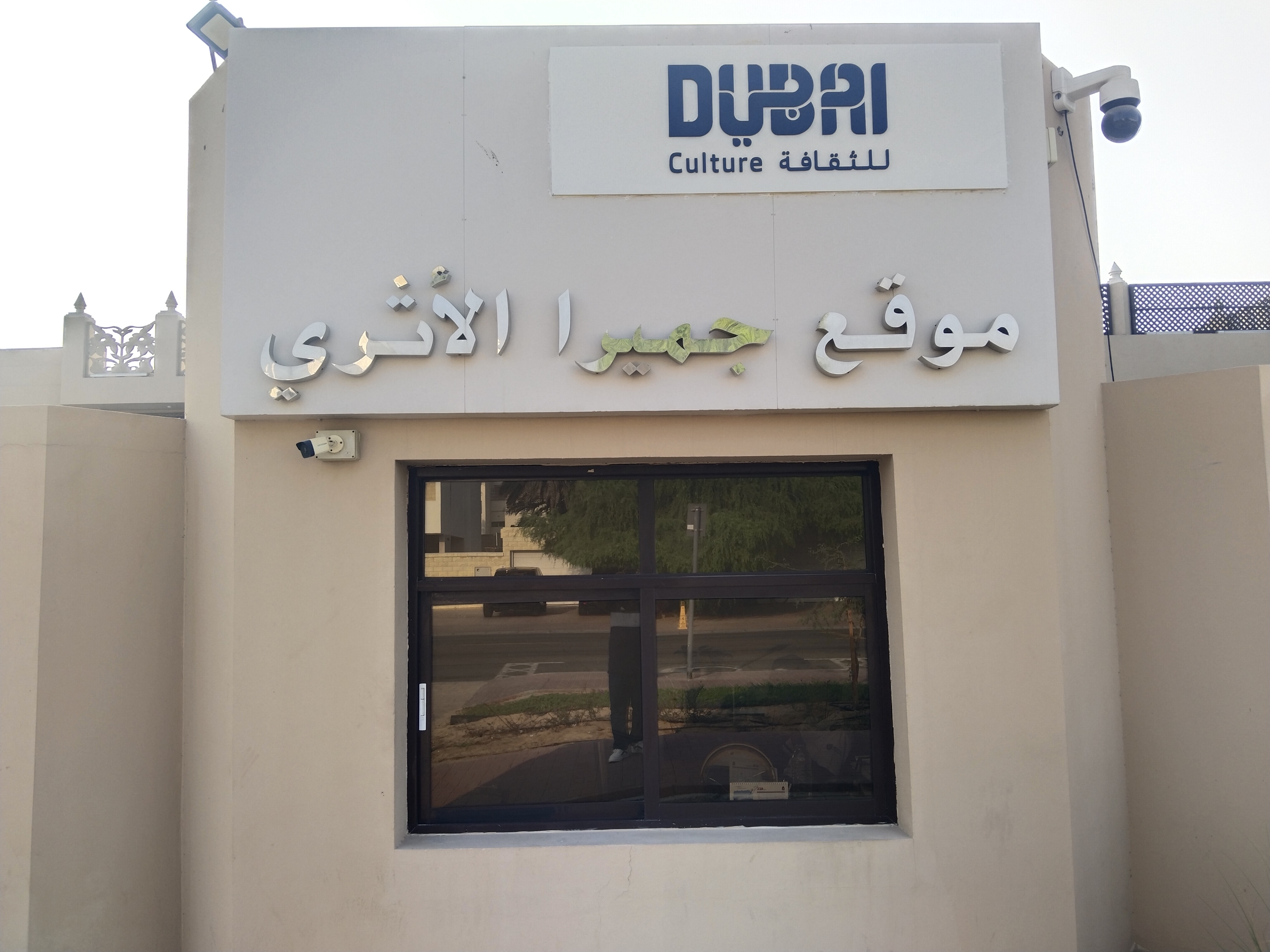
Entrance (Right side)

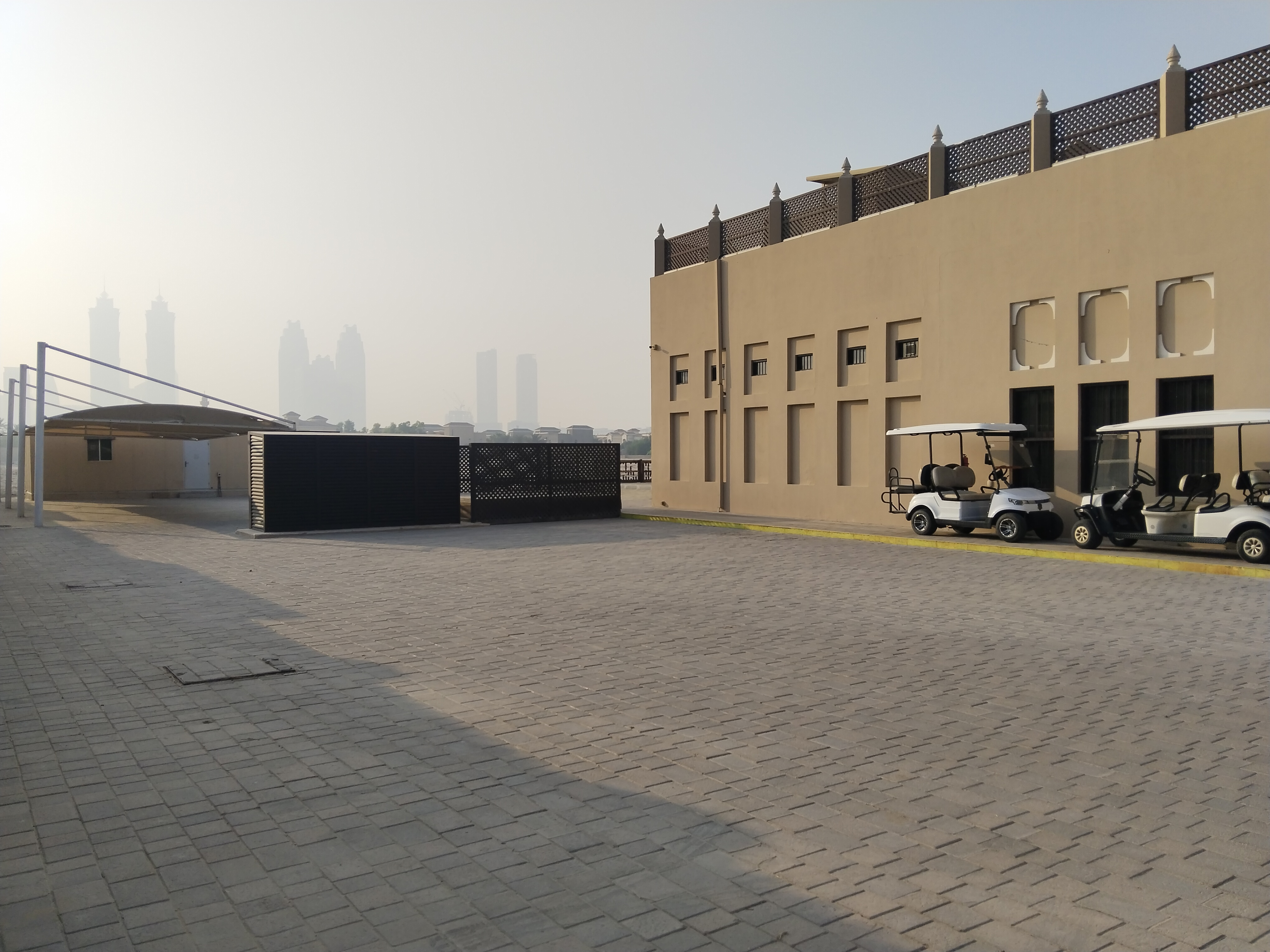
Assembly area

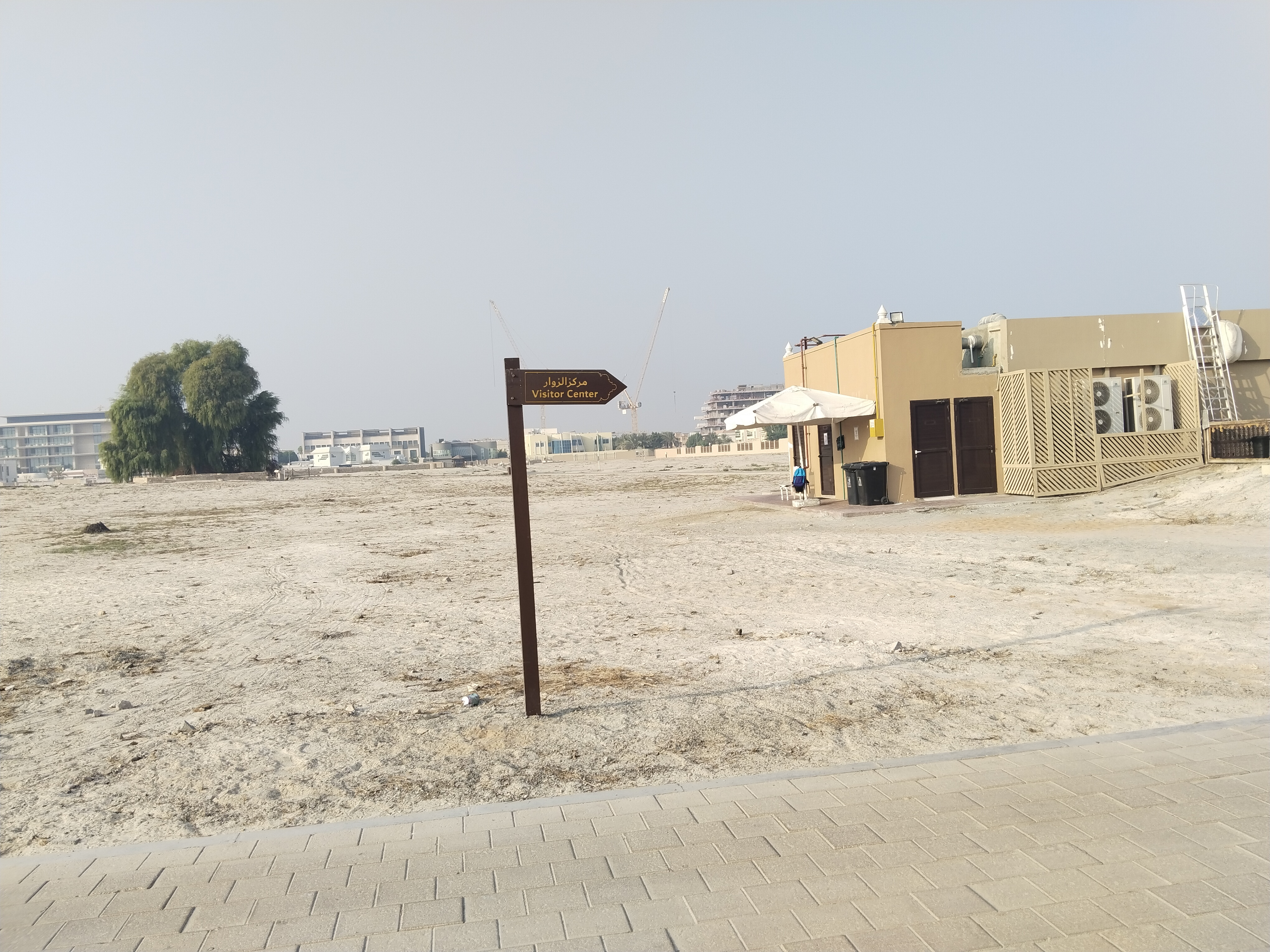
Signpost to Visitor Centre

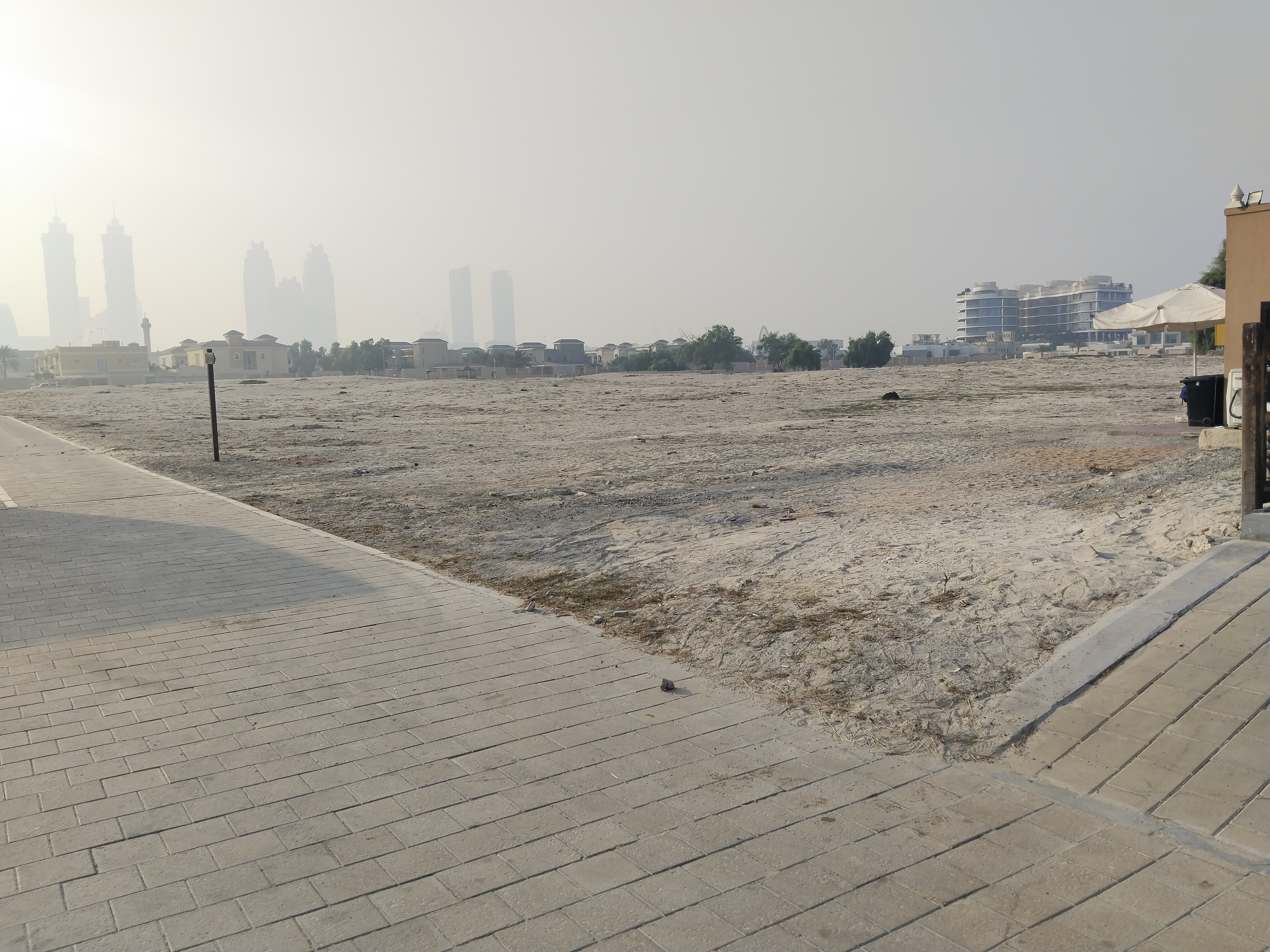
General view

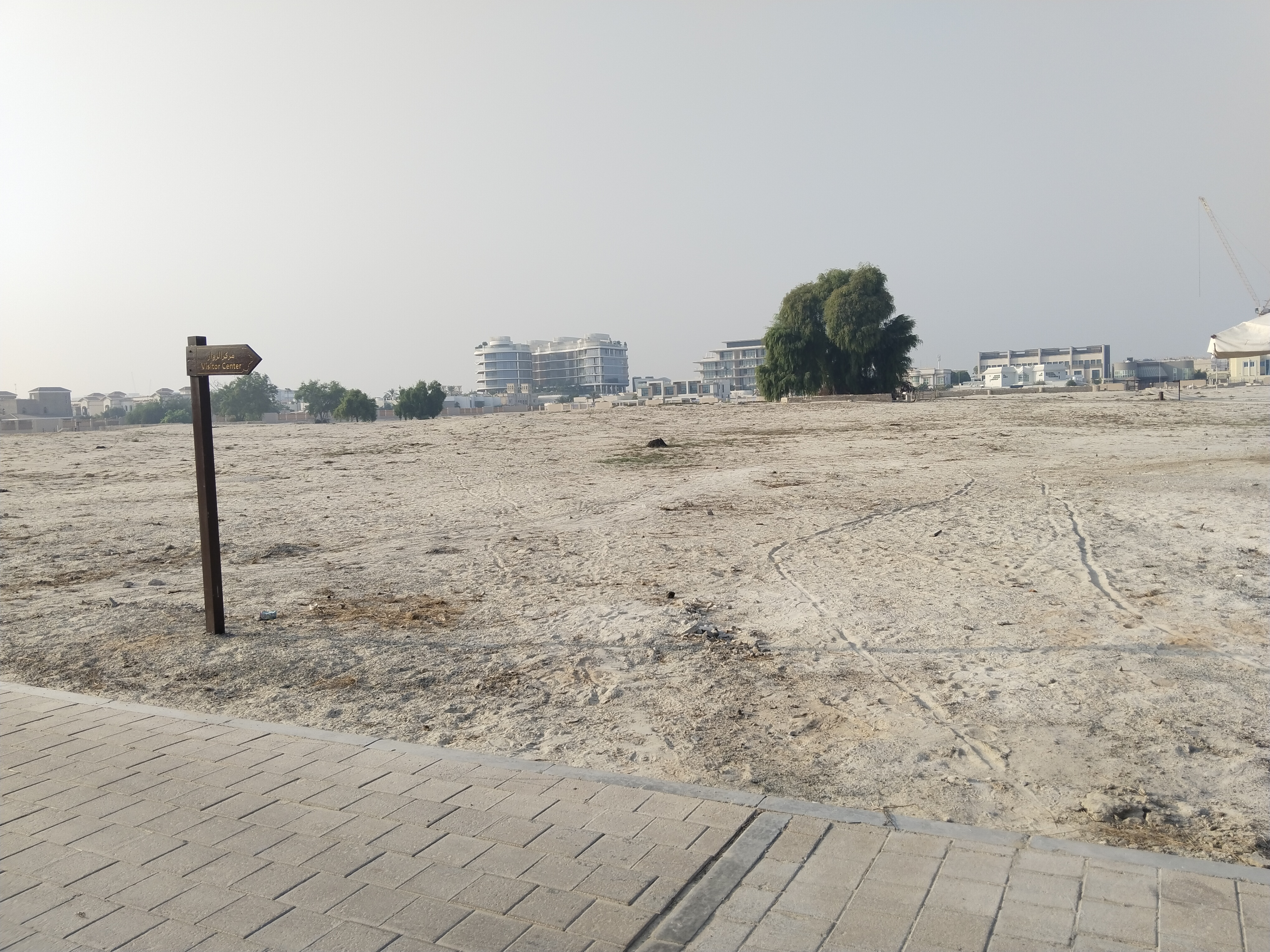
General view

== See also ==
- Archaeology of the United Arab Emirates
- Dubai Museum
- History of the United Arab Emirates
- List of Ancient Settlements in the UAE
