= E 311 road (United Arab Emirates) =

Road in the United Arab Emirates

Coordinates: 25°04′24″N 55°18′14″E

E 311
- إ ٣١١
- Sheikh Mohammad Bin Zayed Road
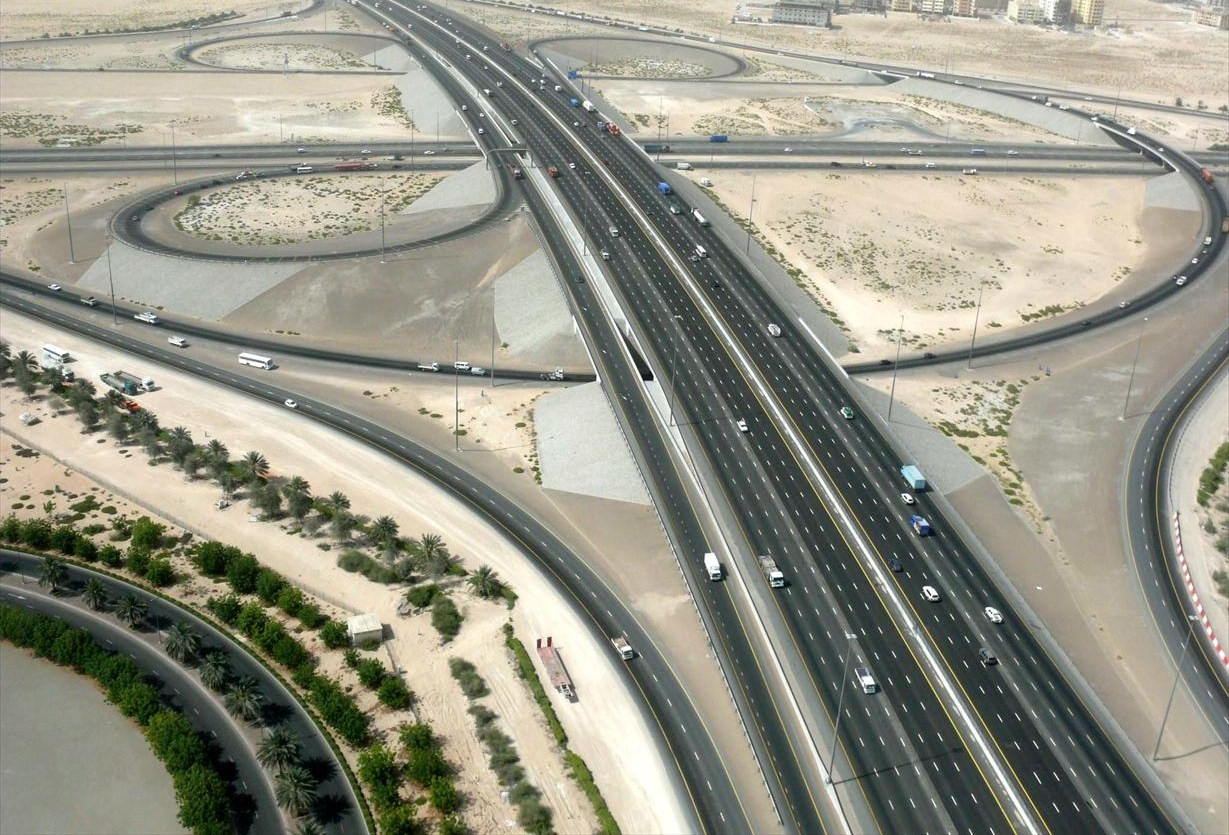
- E 311 (Sheikh Mohammad Bin Zayed Road) in Dubai

Route information
- Length: 225 km (140 mi)
- Existed: 2001–present

Major junctions
- West end: New Al Falah, Abu Dhabi
- E 30 - Al Rawdah Road; E 22 - Abu Dhabi - Al Ain Road; E 20 - Sweihan Road; E 12 - Sheikh Khalifa bin Zayed Al Nahyan Highway; E 16 - Al Taf Road; Al Warqa Street, Khalifa Industrial Area; E 14 - Al Faqa Road; E 75 - Al Faya Road; D 53 - Al Maktoum Airport Street; D 55 - Jabal Ali Industrial Area Street; E 77 - Expo Road; D 57 - Al Yalayis Street; E 44 - Al Khail Road; D 61 - Hessa Street; D 63 - Umm Suqqeim Street; D 67 - Latifa bint Hamdan Street; D 69 - Dubailand Residence Complex Street; E 66 - Dubai - Al Ain Road; D 73 - Dubai - Al Ain Road; D 77 - Manama Street; E 44 - Dubai - Hatta Road; D 79 - Dubai - Hatta Road; D 83 - Al Rebat Street; D 89 - Airport Street; D 91 - Al Quds Street; D 93 - Tunis Street; D 95 - Cairo Street; D 97 - Amman Street; S 102 - Sharjah Ring Road; E 102 - Milehah Street; S 112 - Milehah Street; S 116 - Khalifa bin Zayed Street; S 120 - University City Street; E 88 - Al Dhaid Road; S 128 - Al Dhaid Road; AJ136 - Maktoum bin Rashid Street; S 144 - Al Hamriyah Road; E 55 - Al Shuwaib - Umm Al Quwain Road; U504 - Umm Al Qaiwain Industrial Area Street: E 87 - Al Shuhada Road; E 11 - Mohammed bin Salem Street
- East end: Al Rifah, Ras Al Khaimah

Location
- Country: United Arab Emirates
- Major cities: Abu Dhabi, Dubai, Sharjah, Ajman, Umm al-Quwain, Ras al Khaimah

Highway system
- Transport in the United Arab Emirates; Roads in Dubai

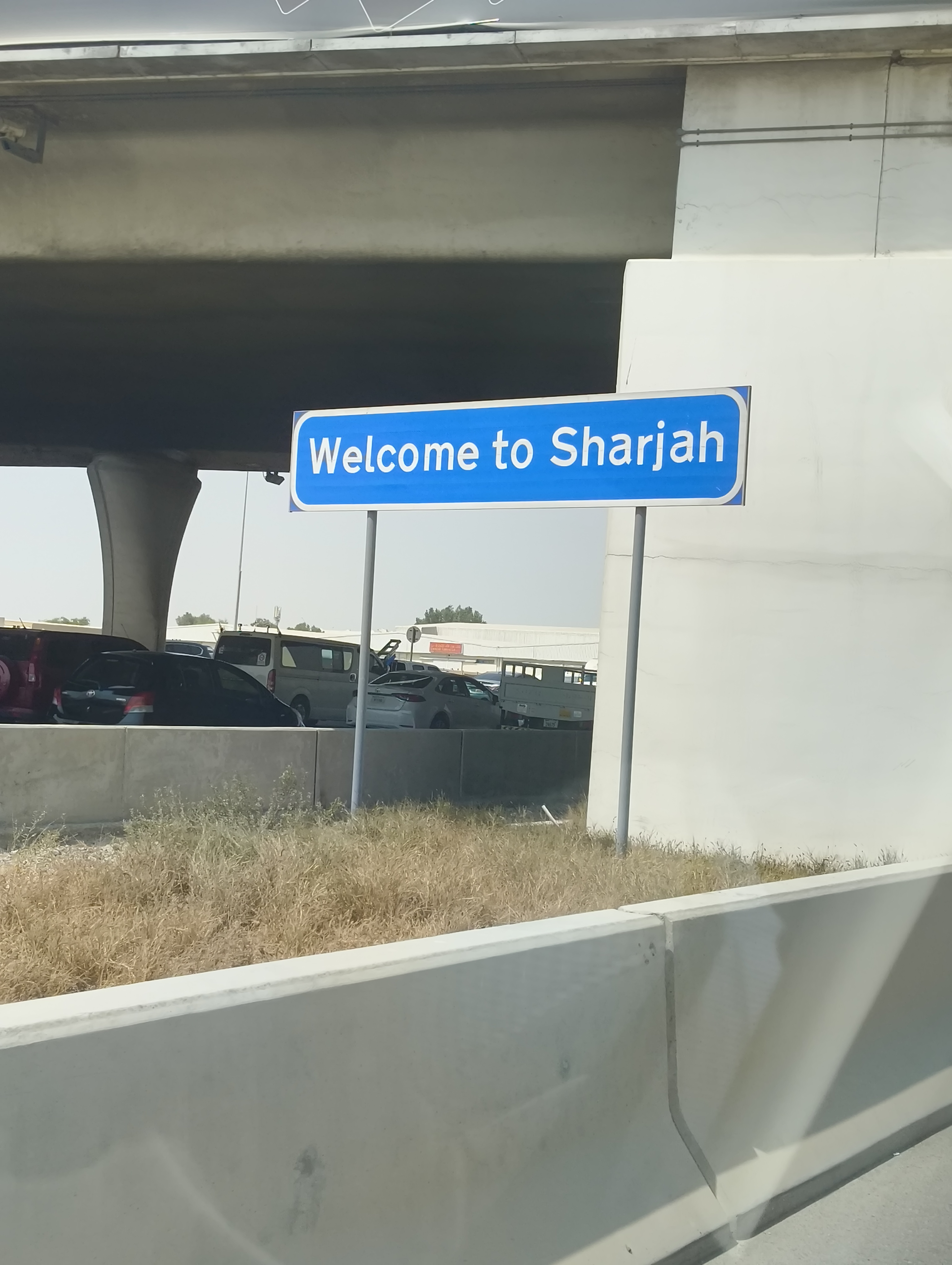
"Welcome to Sharjah" signboard on E311 road

E 311 (known in Arabic as شارع ﺇ ٣١١) is a major road in the United Arab Emirates. It begins in New Al Falah in Abu Dhabi and extends north-eastward towards the Ras al-Khaimah emirate. E 311 has been called Sheikh Mohammad Bin Zayed Road since January 2013 and is commonly known as SMBZ Road. Prior to that it was called Emirates Road, but that name is now given to E 611, which was previously Dubai Bypass Road.

It was originally designed by the Dubai Municipality to cut the traffic of heavy vehicles from the downtown area. However, due to the very bad road infrastructure in Sharjah, traffic bottle-necks are often seen near Dubai-Sharjah border. In 2006 it was re-developed by RTA in Dubai, creating 6 lanes on each side.

In mid-2005, the road was extended to reach the UAE's northernmost emirate of Ras al-Khaimah, passing through the emirates of Ajman, Umm al-Quwain and Sharjah. There is also a project to extend the E 311 through Ras al-Khaimah to the UAE's northern border with Oman (Musandam Peninsula).

In Dubai, Sheikh Mohammad Bin Zayed Road is a prime location for new projects as the area surrounding it can now be accessed easily. Many projects have been proposed or are in various stages of development along the road, including International City, Arabian Ranches, Dubailand, Dubai Silicon Oasis, Global Village, Dubai Sports City Hessa street exit.

Within the city of Dubai, Sheikh Mohammad Bin Zayed Road used to be known as the most dangerous road in the UAE, with 19 fatalities recorded on it within the first six months of 2006. But with improved road designs and replacement of several roundabouts with interchanges, flyovers, speed cameras and increase in lanes, it has become much safer to drive. This road is also used to commute from Jebel Ali area in Dubai to the old town of Dubai such as Bur Dubai and Deira. Sheikh Mohammad Bin Zayed Road is located in the east of Dubai, parallel to Sheikh Zayed Road (E11). People also use the Sheikh Mohammad Bin Zayed Road (E311) as an alternative to the Sheikh Zayed Road E11 which has open road toll gates, SALIK that deducts variable rates depending on the new tariff implemented on January 31, 2025. Specifically, during peak hours (6:00 AM to 10:00 AM and 4:00 PM to 8:00 PM), the toll is AED 6. During off-peak hours (10:00 AM to 4:00 PM and 8:00 PM to 1:00 AM), the toll is AED 4. Additionally, there is a toll-free period from 2:00 AM to 6:00 AM. Lastly the toll is AED 4 for all day during Sunday (excluding the toll-free period, which is applicable for all days)

On 1 January 2013, Sheikh Mohammed Bin Rashid Al Maktoum, ruler of Dubai, ordered that the E 311 highway in Dubai be renamed from Emirates Road to Sheikh Mohammed Bin Zayed Road, in a tribute to General Sheikh Mohammed bin Zayed Al Nahyan, Crown Prince of Abu Dhabi, for his role in advancing inclusive development nationwide.

In 2015, a foreign crane driver attempted to hang himself after parking the crane in the middle of the road. Non-payment of wages was suspected to be the main reason behind this suicide attempt. Shocked motorists called police who were able to negotiate with the driver; it has been reported that he will face charges for attempted suicide.

In November 2016, an extension of E 311 from the Jebel Ali Free Zone in Dubai to New Al Falah in Abu Dhabi opened. The total project cost US$2.1 billion and carries four lanes both ways, with a capacity of 8,000 vehicles an hour. The extension offers an alternative to E 11, which formerly was the only highway connecting the two most populated emirates.

In September 2024 it was reported that two new bridges that were opened on the Garn Al Sabkha-Sheikh Mohammed bin Zayed Road Intersection have managed to reduce up to 70% of traffic during rush hour. This is part of the traffic improvement project in Dubai.

== Peak hour traffic congestion ==
As of 2025, E311 (Sheikh Mohammed bin Zayed Road) regularly experiences heavy congestion during weekday peak periods, particularly along the Sharjah–Dubai corridor. Southbound traffic from Sharjah towards Dubai typically begins building up as early as 05:00, reaching severe congestion between 06:30 and 09:00, coinciding with the start of the working day for most commuters. Conditions generally begin to ease only around 11:00

A similar pattern occurs in the reverse direction during the evening peak. Northbound traffic from Dubai to Sharjah usually starts slowing around 16:00, with the heaviest congestion recorded between 17:00 and 19:00. Traffic gradually clears between 20:00 and 21:00, as the evening commute subsides.

Motorists report extremely slow movement, especially near major junctions and exits.

Similar traffic patterns are also observed on other major highways, particularly E11 (Sheikh Zayed Road) and E611 (Emirates Road). However, congestion levels on these routes are generally less severe compared to E311. As a result, some commuters opt to use the tolled E11 for a faster journey, or the longer but relatively smoother E611 route as an alternative to E311.

"Traffic congestion continues to frustrate motorists across the country, especially in Dubai and Sharjah, where a new study reveals that 91 per cent and 90 per cent of residents, respectively, typically experience traffic jams."

== Description ==
=== Exit List ===
Emirate	Location	km	mi	Exit	Destinations	Notes
Dubai	Dubai			16	Expo City Dubai-Mobility Parking	
Dubai	Dubai			17	Expo Village, Expo Boulevard	
Dubai	Dubai			19	E 77 (Expo Road) – Jabal Ali, Expo City Dubai, Lahbab	
Dubai	Dubai			21	Dubai Investments Parks	
Dubai	Dubai			22	D 57 (Al Yalayis Street) – Jabal Ali	
Dubai	Dubai			23	Al Jouri Street, Dubai Production City 1 Street	
Dubai	Dubai			24	Dubai Production City 2 Street	
Dubai	Dubai			25	E 44 (Al Khail Road) – Al Qouz, Za'abeel, Al Awir, Hatta	
Dubai	Dubai			28	D 61 (Hessa Street)	
Dubai	Dubai			30	D 63 west (Umm Suqeim Street) – Al Barsha, Jumeira; D 63 east (Al Qudra Street) – Madinat Al Qudra	
Dubai	Dubai			37	Global Village	
Dubai	Dubai			41	Wadi Al Safa 4	
Dubai	Dubai			42	Wadi Al Safa 2	
Dubai	Dubai			44	E 66 (Dubai-Al Ain Road) – Bur Dubai, Al Ain; Dubai Silicon Oasis	
Dubai	Dubai			50	D 77 (Manama Street) – Ras Al Khor, Mushrif	
Dubai	Dubai			52	E 44 east (Ras Al Khor Road) – Al Awir, Hatta	
Dubai	Dubai			53	E 44 west (Ras Al Khor Road) – Za'abeel, Bur Dubai	
Dubai	Dubai			55	D 83 west (Al Rebat Street) – Umm Ramool, Al Garhoud, Deira; D 83 east (Tripoli Street) – Mirdif, Al Warqa'a	
Dubai	Dubai			58	D 89 west (Airport Road) – Al Rashidiya, Al Garhoud, Dubai Airport, Deira; D 89 east (Al Khawaneej Street) – Al Khawaneej, Al Mizhar	
Dubai	Dubai			60	D 93 west (Al Nahda Street) – Al Qusais, Abu Hail, Al Twar, Deira; D 93 east (Tunis Street) – Muhaisnah, Al Mizhar	
Dubai	Dubai			64	D 97 west (Amman Street) – Al Qusais, Al Nahda, Muhaisnah, Oud Al Muteena	
Dubai	Dubai	1.000 mi = 1.609 km; 1.000 km = 0.621 mi				
