= E 77 road (United Arab Emirates) =

Road in the United Arab Emirates

E 77
- إ ٧٧
- Expo Road - Lehbab Road

Route information
- Length: 55.8 km (34.7 mi)

Major junctions
- North end: E 45 (Dubai-Hatta Road)
- E 66 (Dubai - Al Ain Road) D 63 - Al Qudra Rd; E 611 (Emirates Road); D 54 - Sheikh Zayed bin Hamdan Al Nahyan Street E 311 (Sheikh Mohammed Bin Zayed Road)
- South end: E 11 (Sheikh Zayed Road)

Location
- Country: United Arab Emirates
- Major cities: Dubai, Hatta

Highway system
- Transport in the United Arab Emirates; Roads in Dubai

E 77 (Arabic: إ ٧٧) is a route in the United Arab Emirates (UAE). It begins at the 7th interchange of Sheikh Zayed Road (E 11) near Jebel Ali Industrial Area, and progresses southward towards the interior town of Hatta, intersecting with the Dubai–Al Ain Highway (E 66) along the way. E 77 eventually merges with E 44 at Al Lehbab, which leads to Hatta.

Important city landmarks and localities such as Dubai Investment Park and the soon to be built Dubai World Central International Airport are located on E 77's pathway to Lehbab.
