= D 94 road (United Arab Emirates) =

Road in Dubai, United Arab Emirates

D 94
- د ٩٤

Route information
- Length: 26.4 km (16.4 mi)

Major junctions
- East-Northeast end: Dubai Maritime City, Dubai Dry Docks
- West-Southwest end: after Jumeirah Beach Residence, merges with Sheikh Zayed Road

Location
- Country: United Arab Emirates
- Major cities: Dubai

Highway system
- Transport in the United Arab Emirates; Roads in Dubai

D 94, also known as King Salman bin Abdulaziz Al Saud Street, Jumeirah Road or Jumeirah Beach Road, and formerly Al Sufouh Road is a road in Dubai, United Arab Emirates. The road runs parallel to Dubai's coast along the Persian Gulf and along E 11 (Sheikh Zayed Road), connecting the sub-localities of Jumeirah (Jumeirah 1, 2 and 3). Once it enters the locality of Al Sufouh, D 94 becomes known as King Salman bin Abdulaziz Al Saud Street. It originates near Dubai Maritime City and the Dubai Dry Docks; and terminates after Jumeirah Beach Residence by turning south and merging with the Sheikh Zayed Road.

Important landmarks along D 94 include Dubai DryDocks, Jumeirah Grand Mosque, Mercato Mall, Dubai Zoo, Jumeirah Beach Hotel, Wild Wadi Water Park, Burj Al Arab, Madinat Jumeirah and Palm Jumeirah.

The Jumeirah section of the road underwent a beautification and expansion project in the early 2000s which added another lane on both the directions of the road; and increased the greenery and barriers on the road medians.

The Al Sufouh Tramway operates along this route to connect Jumeirah and Umm Suqeim with the rest of the Dubai Metro network. It began operating in November 2014.

The road was renamed in September 2016 from Al Sufouh Road to King Salman bin Abdulaziz Al Saud Street in honor of the Saudi Arabian King Salman's contributions to the wider Arab world.

Segments of the road are used for the Dubai Marathon.
