= Tahnoun bin Mohammed Al Nahyan =

Emirati royal and businessman (1942–2024)

Sheikh Tahnoun bin Mohammed Al Nahyan
- طحنون بن محمد آل نهيان

Ruler's Representative in the Eastern Region
- In office 1971–2024
- President: Zayed bin Sultan Al Nahyan; Khalifa bin Zayed Al Nahyan; Mohamed bin Zayed Al Nahyan
- Preceded by: Khalifa bin Zayed Al Nahyan
- Succeeded by: Hazza bin Zayed Al Nahyan

Deputy Chairman of the Executive Council of Abu Dhabi
- In office 1977–2006
- Monarch: Zayed bin Sultan Al Nahyan

Personal details
- Born: 1942 Al Ain, Trucial States
- Died: 1 May 2024 (aged 82) Al Ain, United Arab Emirates

Tahnoun bin Mohammed Al Nahyan (Arabic: طحنون بن محمد آل نهيان, romanized: ṭaḥnūn bin muḥammad ʾāl nahyān; 1942 – 1 May 2024) was an Emirati politician and member of the Abu Dhabi ruling family. He was the Ruler's Representative of the Eastern Region of the Emirate of Abu Dhabi, the United Arab Emirates until his death on 1 May 2024. He also previously served as deputy chairman of the Executive Council of Abu Dhabi, chairman of the Abu Dhabi National Oil Company and deputy chairman of the Supreme Petroleum Council.

Tahnoun bin Mohammed played a pivotal role in the establishment of the United Arab Emirates and he worked closely with the UAE's founding father Sheikh Zayed bin Sultan Al Nahyan on the declaration of the Union on December 2, 1971. He was known for his close ties and direct communication with the people of Al Ain.

== Personal life ==
Sheikh Tahnoon was the brother-in-law of the founding father of the UAE president Sheikh Zayed bin Sultan Al Nahyan through his sister Sheikha Hassa's marriage to Sheikh Zayed.

Al Nahyan died on 1 May 2024, at the age of 82.

== Legacy ==
In November 2018, the road from Al Ain to Dubai was renamed in his honor.

On 11th October 2026, UAE president Sheikh Mohamed bin Zayed ordered the renaming of the Al Ain International Airport to Tahnoun International Airport, in recognition of Sheikh Tahnoun bin Mohammed Al Nahyan service to the United Arab Emirates.

Tahnoun bin Mohammed Stadium in Al Ain is named in his honor.
