= Za'abeel, Dubai =

Zabeel زعبيل
- Community
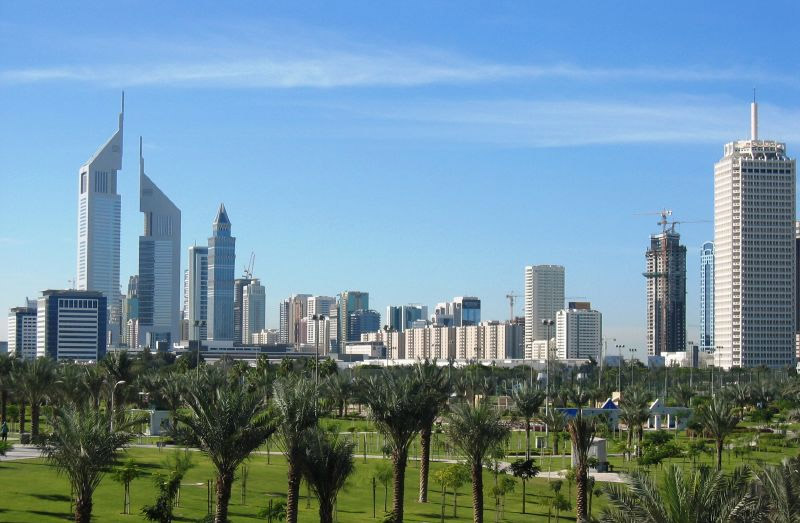
- Dubai's skyline from Za'abeel Park
- Interactive map of Zabeel
- Coordinates: 25.22358°N 55.30603°E
- Country: United Arab Emirates
- Emirate: Dubai
- City: Dubai

Area
  - Total: 10 km^{2} (3.9 sq mi)

Population (2000)
  - Total: 5,283
  - Density: 530/km^{2} (1,400/sq mi)
- Community number: 325 (Zabeel 1); 337 (Zabeel 2)

Za'abeel (Arabic: زعبيل) is a community in Dubai, United Arab Emirates (UAE), located in eastern Dubai. It consists of two sub-communities, Za'abeel 1 and Za'abeel 2, which are relatively new and affluent, featuring villas and townhomes.

== Sub-communities ==
Za'abeel 1 is adjacent to Al Nasr and is bounded to the south by routes E 66 (Oud Metha Road) and D 73 (2nd Zabeel Road). This sub-community is residential and contains Za'abeel Stadium, and Za'abeel Park, a popular spot for sports and live music.

Za'abeel 2 contains the Nad Al Sheba Racecourse and Zabeel Palace, the official residence of the ruling Al Maktoum family. Za'abeel 2 is bounded to the east by Za'abeel 1 and to the west by Business Bay.
