= E 611 road (United Arab Emirates) =

Road in the United Arab Emirates

E 611
- إ ٦١١
- Emirates Road

Route information
- Length: 100 mi (160 km)
- Existed: 2006–present

Location
- Country: United Arab Emirates
- Major cities: Dubai, Abu Dhabi, Sharjah, Umm al Quwain, Ras al Khaimah

Highway system
- Transport in the United Arab Emirates; Roads in Dubai

E 611 (Arabic: إ ٦١١) is a road constructed in the United Arab Emirates (UAE). Also known as the "Emirates Road", E 611 is developed to link the emirate of Abu Dhabi with the northern emirates of Ras al Khaimah, Umm al Quwain, parallel to E311 without passing through the city of Dubai.

== History and description ==
The project is being developed in three phases. Work on Phase 1, which began in February 2006, was intended to create a sector that starts along E 66 (Dubai–Al Ain Road) and extends inward towards E 77 (Jebel Ali–Al-Habab Road). Phase II of the project, which began in January 2007, involved linking the bypass with E 88 (Al Dhaid Road) in Sharjah. Phase III will involve extending E 611 from the Jebel Ali–Al-Habab junction to the outskirts of Abu Dhabi City and is expected to cost approximately US$80 million.

E 611 was called "Dubai Bypass Road" or "Outer Bypass Road" (also called the "Dubai Ring Road"), before being renamed the "Emirates Road" in 2013.

In 2010, UPS Airline Flight 6, a cargo plane crashed near the highway by the Dubai Silicon Oasis, after it took off from Dubai International Airport. All people aboard were killed.

Sharjah's largest mosque, opened in May 2019, is located at the junction of this road and the road to Mleiha.

== Gallery ==
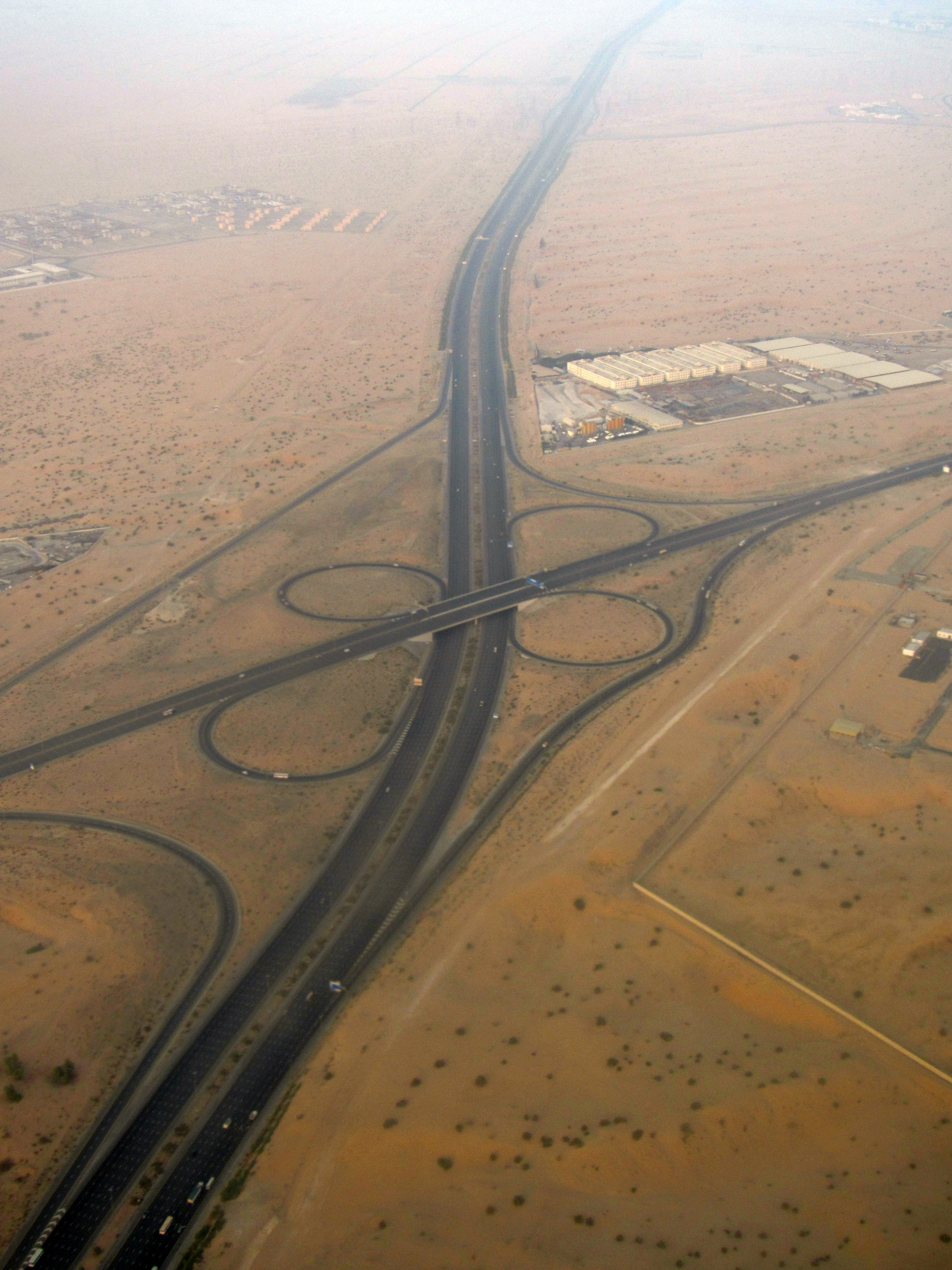
Aerial view of E611

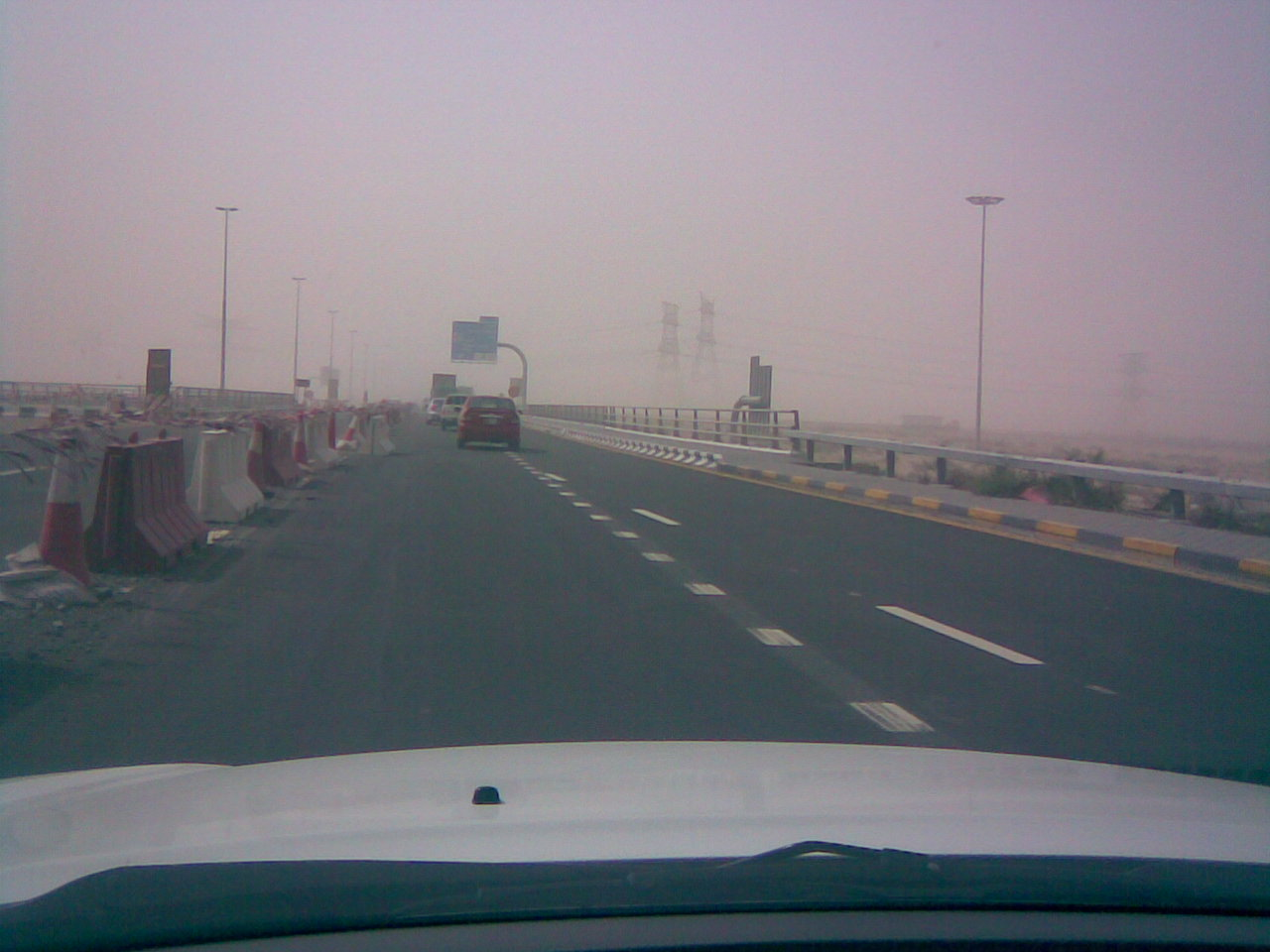
E611 during a sandstorm
