= List of roads in Dubai =

Highway sign of "E"

Highway sign of "D"

There are two major series of highways in Dubai, which are "E" and "D". These are further divided into several major and minor inter-city and intra-city roads. The network of highways and roads in Dubai, United Arab Emirates are managed by the Roads and Transport Authority (RTA)

These are the list of highways in Dubai, United Arab Emirates.

1. E 11

2. E 44

3. E 66

4. E 77

5. E 311

6. E 611

For the D-routes in dubai, check Dubai route numbering system.

== See also ==
- Dubai route numbering system
