= Transport in the United Arab Emirates =

Transport in the United Arab Emirates refers to the various forms of transport in the United Arab Emirates (UAE) by road, rail, air, and water.

== Roads ==
The United Arab Emirates (UAE) has an extensive and well-developed road network, principally in the northern coastal area where the main population centres are located. Many of these roads have been improved to become multi-lane dual-carriageway motorways, coping with the high demand for road transportation.

The UAE has a right hand traffic. Historically, the UAE had a left hand traffic until 1st September 1966.

Speed limits are 160 km/h (100 mph) on freeways (some freeway network's like E22 were imposed with a lower speed limit by the Abu Dhabi Government), 100 km/h (60 mph) on rural roads, and 60 or 80 km/h (35 or 50 mph) on urban dual-carriageways. Heavy trucks and buses are installed with speed limiters to prevent overspeeding.

In 2006, UAE had a score of 190 killed per million population in traffic collisions linked to high speeds and poor safety culture.

In 2010, UAE had a score near of 100 killed per million population in traffic collisions.

In 2013, UAE had a score near of 109 killed per million population in traffic collisions, as estimated by the WHO

Between 2014 and 2018 peopled killed by traffic has drop by 34%.

=== List of motorways ===
- E10 Abu Dhabi – Al Shahama. Length: 44 km (27 mi).
- E11 Al Silaa – Al Jeer. Length: 583 km (362 mi). This is the most important motorway of the country, stretching from Saudi Arabia to Oman, connecting Abu Dhabi, Dubai, Sharjah, Ajman, Umm al-Quwain, Ras al-Khaimah, and other important centres.
- E12 Abu Dhabi – Al Falah. Length: 34 km (21 mi).
- E14 Abu Dhabi - Al Faqaʻ Road (from E11 to E66). Length: 84 km.
- E15 Ruways – Wasit Oasis. Length: 145 km (90 mi).
- E16 Al Rahba – Al Saad. Length: 100 km (62 mi).
- E18 Ras Al Khaimah – Al Manama. Length: 98 km (61 mi).
- E20 Abu Dhabi – Al Hayer. Length: 144 km (89 mi).
- E22 Abu Dhabi – Al Ain. Length: 157 km (98 mi).
- E30 (Abu Dhabi - Al Ain Road; parallel to E 22 Road)
- E44 Dubai–Hatta. Length: 129 km (80 mi).
- E45 Tarif–Liwa. Length: 109 km (68 mi).
- E55 Umm al-Quwain – Al Shuwaib. Length: 131 km (81 mi).
- E66 Dubai – Al Ain. Length: 130 km (81 mi).
- E75 Saih Sheib – Al Fayah Truck Road
- E77 (Expo Road/Jabal Ali-Lahbab Road). Length: 56 km (33 mi).
- E84 Al Malaiha – Fujairah. Length: 43 km (27 mi).
- E88 Sharjah – Masafi. Length: 77 km (48 mi).
- E89 Diba al Fujairah – Fujairah. Length: 66 km (41 mi).
- E99 Diba al Fujairah – Kalba. Length: 82 km (51 mi).
- E102 Sharjah – Kalba. Length: 119 km (74 mi).
- E311 Abu Dhabi – Ras al Khaimah. Length: 139 km (86 mi).
- E611 Dubai – Umm al-Quwain. Also known as Emirates Road, formerly Dubai Bypass Road. Length: 110 km (68 mi).

== Traffic in the United Arab Emirates ==
The population of the UAE increased from 344,513 in 1971 to 9,591,853 in 2024. The Ministry of Energy and Infrastructure is responsible for maintaining highways and road connection between emirates. The highways and road infrastructure is monitored 24/7 by the ministry which utilizes Artificial Intelligence to monitor traffic.

=== Current Traffic Congestion in Major Emirates ===
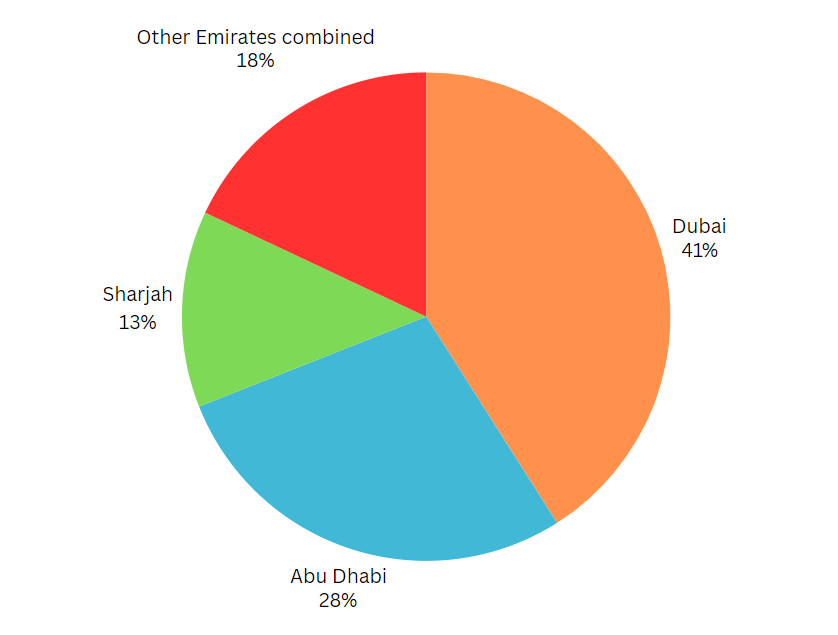
Percentage of Vehicles in the UAE in each Emirate

People spend 20 hours per week stuck in traffic (around 8.4% of their weekly time). Dubai emirate comes in first place with 1.44 million vehicles per emirate, followed by Abu Dhabi with 0.98 million vehicles, then Sharjah with 0.46 million vehicles. In contrast, the other emirates combined (Ajman, Umm Al Quwain, Fujairah, and Ras Al Khaimah) have around 0.63 million vehicles.

Dubai, being a globally recognized and go-to destination city with nearly 66.6 million visitors annually, has some challenges when it comes to traffic congestion between the two main roads that connect the other Emirates and the Dubai Emirate called: “UAE road” and “Mohammed Bin Zayed road”. These roads play an important role in daily commuting because they act as a vital artery, linking the emirates of the country to each other. Furthermore, these roads act as a traffic hub, contributing to facilitating traffic flow and the movement of transport between the Emirates.

=== Factors that Contribute towards Traffic Congestion ===
Several factors contributed to the increased traffic congestion experienced by many drivers in the UAE over the past years, as follows:

- Urbanization: Due to the rapid increase of populations in urban areas, more people opted to own their vehicles for transportation.
- Population growth: In the year 2012 Dubai’s Population was close to 2.3 million individuals. By the year 2022, Dubai has noted an increase in its population by 52.5% reaching 3.5 million people in 10 years.
- Economic: Traffic congestion increases the total cost of delivering goods, by delaying the arrival of goods. In addition, traffic congestion increases operational costs on the business corporation level.

=== Impacts of Traffic Congestion on ===
==== Economy ====
Each minute a car's engine is turned on while being stuck in traffic causes significant fuel consumption, with approximately 1.6 million liters of fuel being consumed annually, which results in an increased amount of money spent on fuel refills.

==== Environment ====
Yearly CO_{2} emissions due to traffic congestion reach 105 Kilograms of Carbon Dioxide released into the atmosphere, which leads to global warming.

=== Major accidents ===
Six people were killed, at least 40 were injured and dozens of vehicles burned March 11, 2008 when hundreds of cars collided on a fog-shrouded Abu Dhabi–Dubai highway.

=== Buses ===
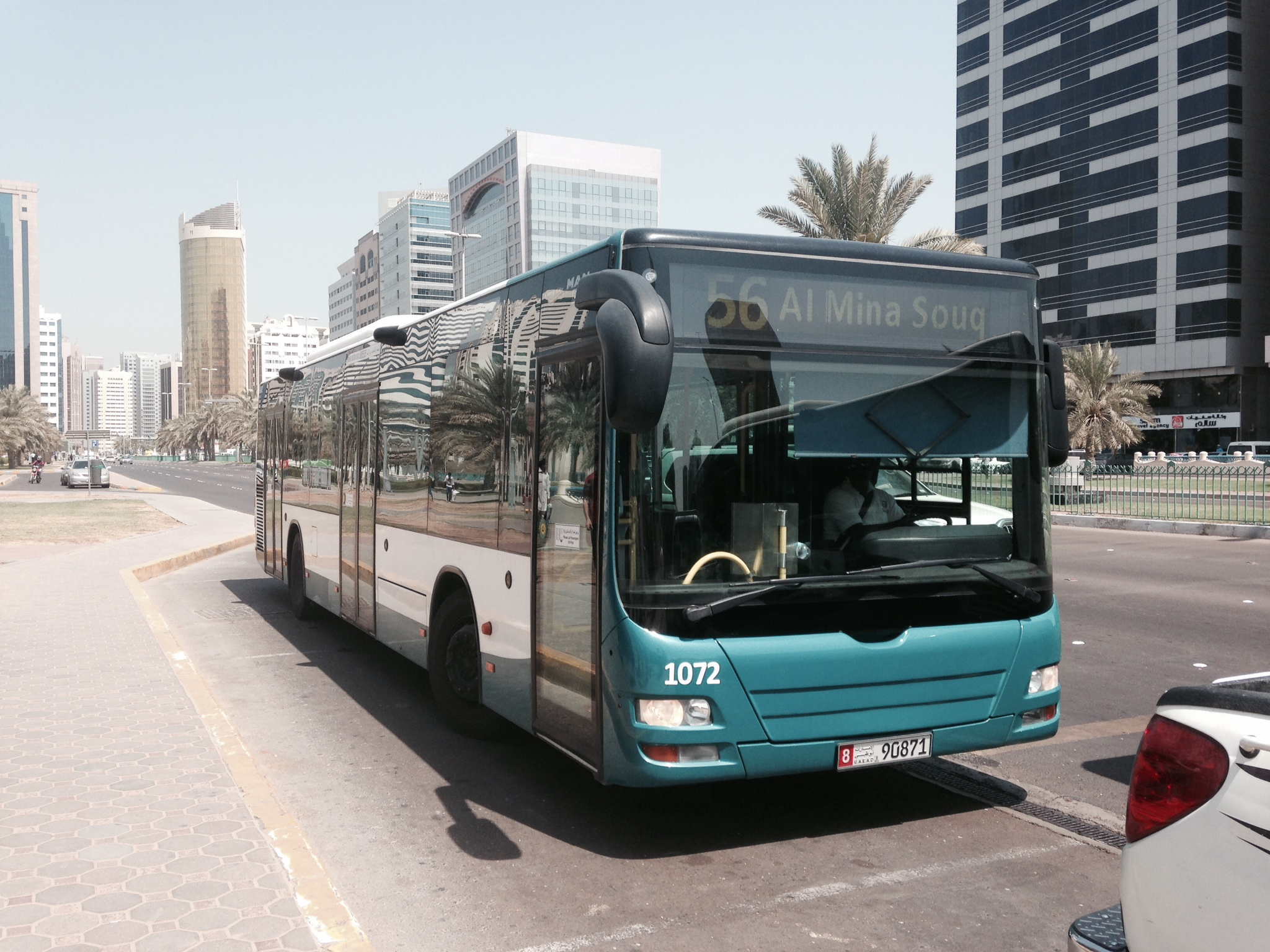
A bus in Abu Dhabi

Bus services were introduced in Abu Dhabi by the Emirate in 2008 with four routes which were zero fare in their pilot year. At the end of 2011, bus services in the Emirate of Abu Dhabi provided more than 95 service routes with 650 buses to transport 50 million passengers in the region. In the Bus Network Plan in 2013, 14 bus routes were operated in Abu Dhabi City.

In Dubai, the Roads and Transport Authority (RTA) operates bus services under the name DubaiBus. Buses in Sharjah are operated by Mowasalat, and in Ajman by the Ajman Transport Authority. There are also buses operating between the different Emirates due to the lack of rail connectivity, although this is planned to be rectified in the near future.

==== Transport payment systems ====
Fares on Abu Dhabi buses are paid by the Hafilat Card since 2015, which is a contactless smart card to be flashed when entering and exiting the bus at mini-terminals inside of the bus. It is currently only available for bus travelers but will gradually be expanded into the water transport systems and the planned Abu Dhabi Metro, Etihad Rail and the Abu Dhabi Tram System. The Ojra card is used by frequent travellers. The Nol card is a contactless smart card used for Public Transport around Dubai and purchasing goods on ZOOM. It is also used for payment on buses between Dubai and other cities.

==== Taxis ====
A Toyota Metro Taxi vehicle near Sharaf DG station in Bur Dubai, Dubai, April 2022

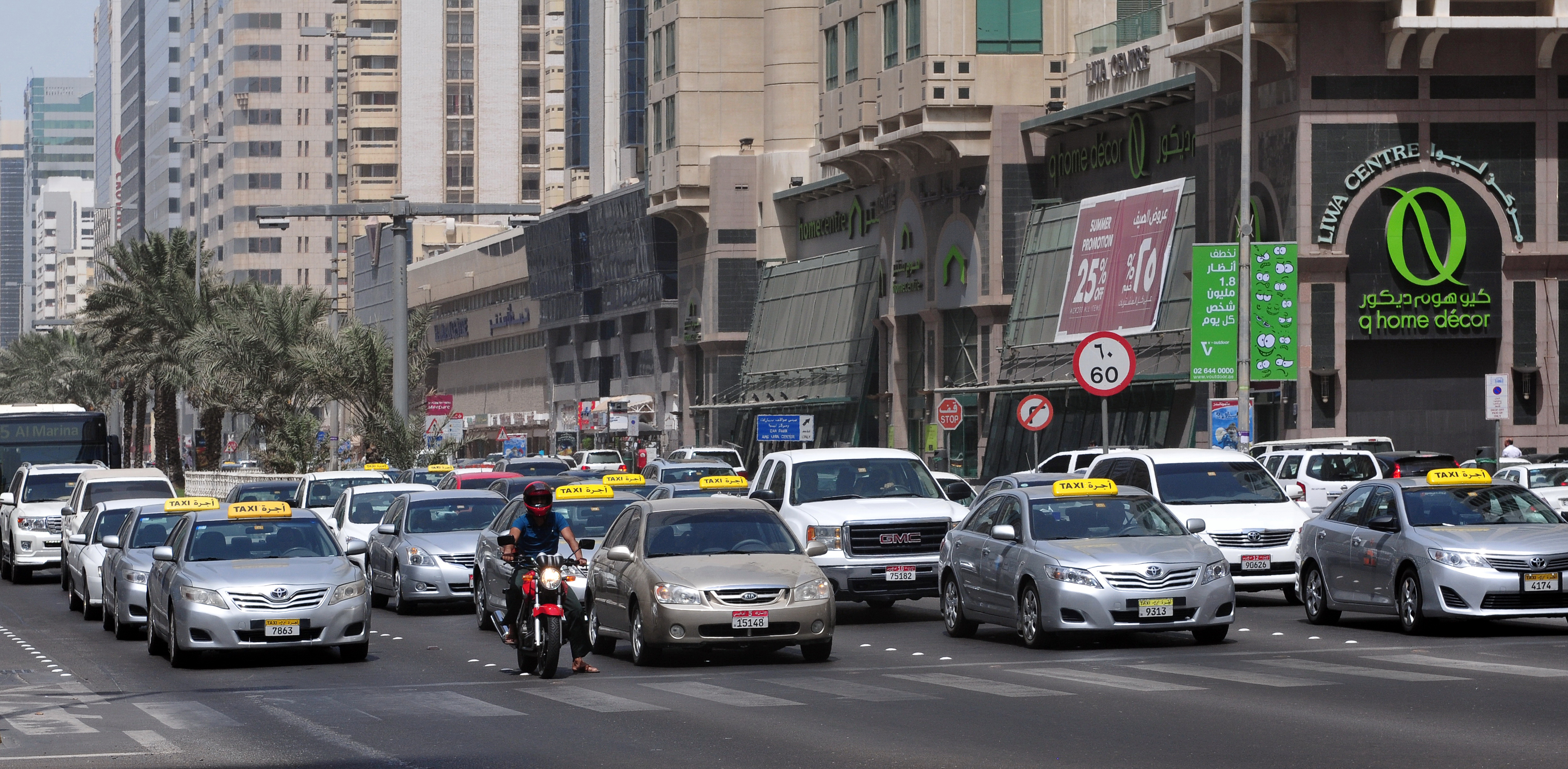
Taxis in Abu Dhabi, 2013.

Taxis in the UAE accept card payments.

== Rail ==
Etihad Rail is a state-owned company, and is the national railway company. It was set up in 2009 to manage a national-level freight and passenger rail network within the country, and later to other nations of the Gulf Cooperation Council as part of Gulf Railway. The first phase of the system is complete and freight service has begun. The second phase will connect the railway to Mussafah, Khalifa and Jebel Ali ports in Dubai, and is planned to connect to the Saudi and Omani borders. In January 2016, construction of phase two was suspended for re-evaluation, while service on phase one continued. Costing approximately US$10 billion, the three-stage rail system is planned to have 1,200 km (750 mi) of railway connecting cities in UAE and linking to other Gulf countries. Abu Dhabi, Al Ain, Dubai, Sharjah, Fujairah, Ras Al Khaimah and Khor Fakkan will be linked by Etihad Rail when construction is completed.

The Dubai Metro has operated since 2009, and the Abu Dhabi Metro is currently under construction.

The Dubai Tram was launched in November 2014, and operates mainly in the Dubai Marina with new stations being constructed. Another tram system is being planned for Sharjah and Ajman.

A high-speed train project connecting Abu Dhabi and Dubai was announced in January 2025.

On June 30th 2026, Etihad Rail began passenger railway services.

== Air ==
The General Civil Aviation Authority (GCAA) started applying an advanced program in 2010 that allows the assessment of aircraft registered in foreign countries in order to ensure their safety and airworthiness. In 2011, it banned all aircraft registered in Congo DR, Eswatini, Equatorial Guinea, Sierra Leone and São Tomé and Príncipe due to their poor safety standards.

=== Airports ===
Dubai International Airport was the busiest airport in the world by international passenger traffic in 2014. Abu Dhabi International Airport is the second-largest airport in the UAE. Due to the announced expansion of Al Maktoum Airport on 28 April 2024, Dubai International Airport will be shut down once Al Maktoum Airport expansion will be completed.

There are 42 airports in the UAE as of 2013.

Runways
| Length | Number of | |
| Length | paved | unpaved |
|---|---|---|
| over 3,000 m (10,000 ft) | 12 | 1 |
| 2,400–3,000 m (8,000–10,000 ft) | 3 | 1 |
| 1,500–2,400 m (5,000–8,000 ft) | 4 | 4 |
| 910–1,520 m (3,000–5,000 ft) | 4 | 6 |
| under 910 m (3,000 ft) | 2 | 5 |
| Total: | 25 | 17 |

Heliports: Five are known as of 2013.

=== Airlines ===
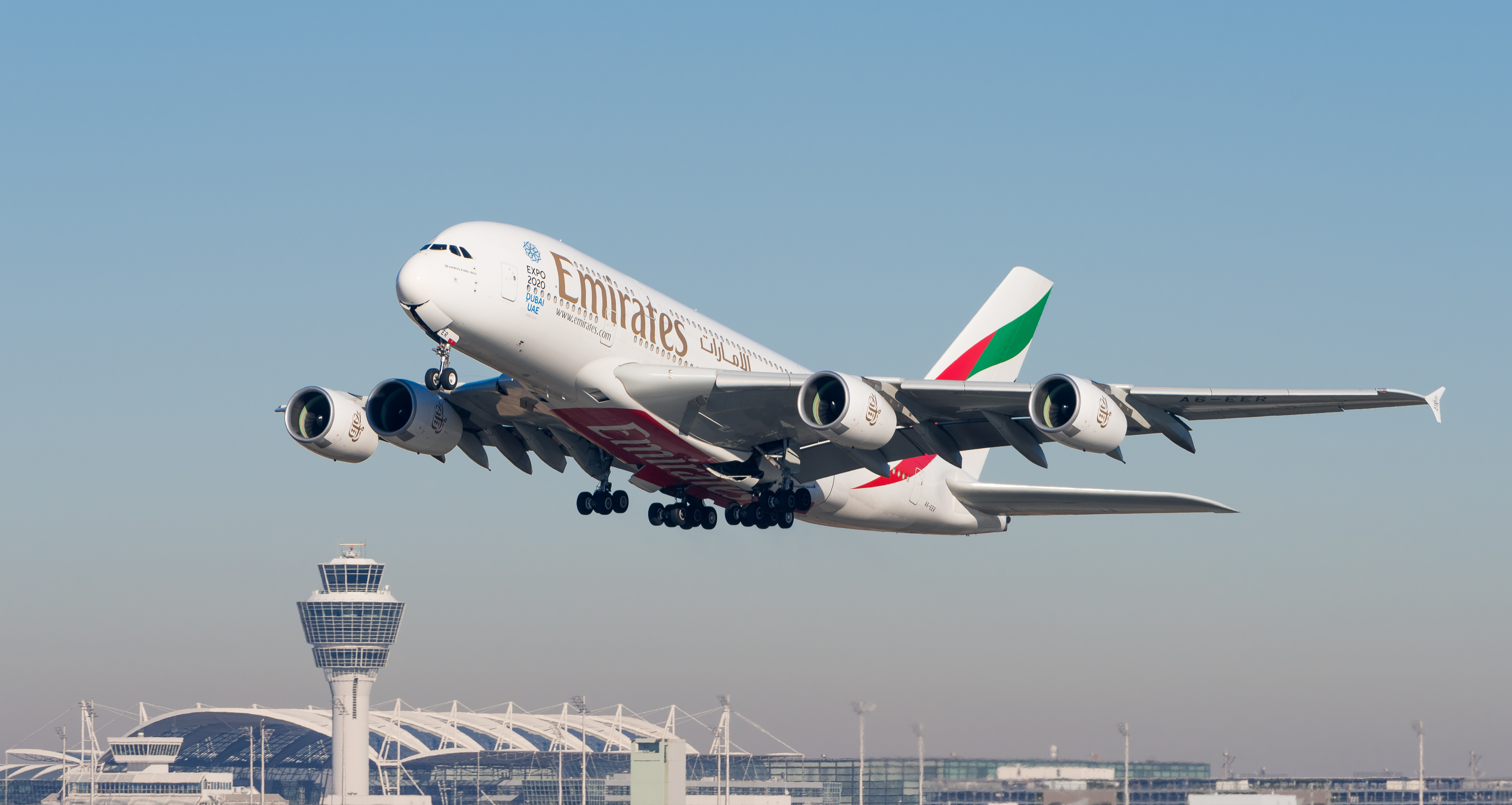
As of December 2024, Emirates is the largest airline in the Middle East

Emirates is the biggest national airline of the UAE and is owned by Government of Dubai. Etihad Airways is the second-largest national airline and is owned by Government of Abu Dhabi. Other airlines are flyDubai, Air Arabia and Wizz Air Abu Dhabi.

== Pipelines ==
- Crude oil, 830 kilometres (516 mi)
- Natural gas, including natural gas liquids, 870 kilometres (541 mi)

== Ports and harbours ==
The major ports are Khalifa Port, Zayed Port, Port of Jebel Ali, Port Rashid, Port Khalid, Port Saeed, and Container Port Khor Fakkan. Other ports include Fujairah Port (a bunkering port), Das Island (tanker port).

=== Merchant marine ===
The merchant marine consisted of 68 ships of 1,000 gross tonnage (GT) or over, totaling 1,107,442 GT or 1,795,235 tonnes deadweight (DWT) in the following types (1999 est.):

- bulk, 1
- cargo, 18
- chemical tanker, 3
- container, 8
- liquified gas, 1
- livestock carrier, 1
- passenger, 1
- petroleum tanker, 27
- roll-on/roll-off, 7
- specialized tanker, 1

== See also ==
- Transportation in Dubai
