= Jumeirah =

Jumeirah جُمَيْرَا
- Community
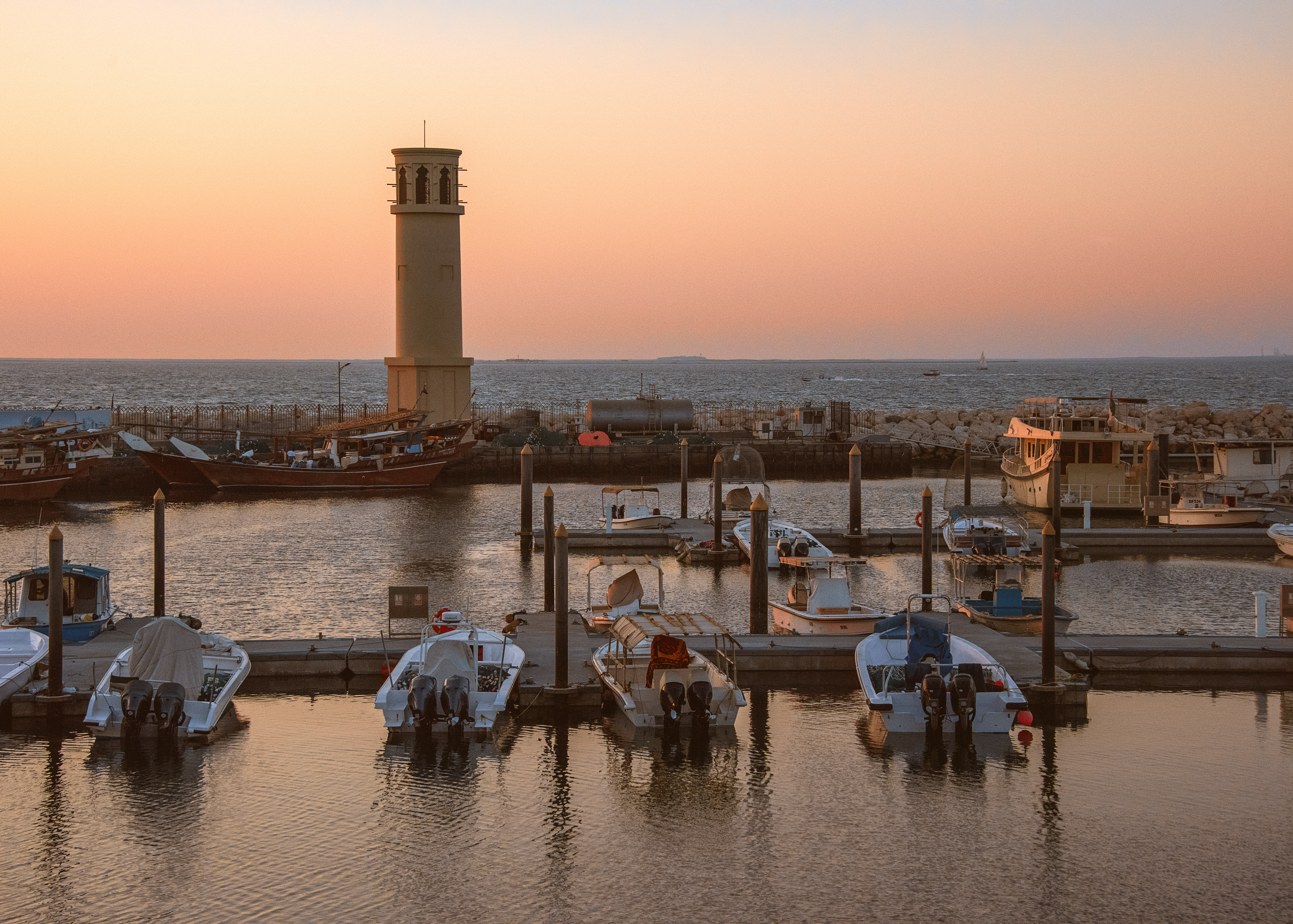
- Jumeirah Fishing Harbour
- Interactive map of Jumeirah
- Coordinates: 25.202°N 55.244°E
- Country: United Arab Emirates
- Emirate: Emirate of Dubai
- City: Dubai
- Boroughs: List: Jumeirah 1; Jumeirah 2; Jumeirah 3

Area
  - Total: 6.9 km^{2} (2.7 sq mi)

Population (2024)
  - Total: 47,319
  - Density: 6,900/km^{2} (18,000/sq mi)

Jumeirah (Arabic: جُمَيْرَا, romanized: Jumayrā Emirati pronunciation: [dʒʊˈmeːrɐ]) is a coastal residential area of Dubai, United Arab Emirates mainly comprising low rise private dwellings and hotel developments. It has both large expensive detached properties and more modest town houses built in a variety of architectural styles. The area is popular with expatriates working in Dubai and is familiar to many visiting tourists.

== History ==
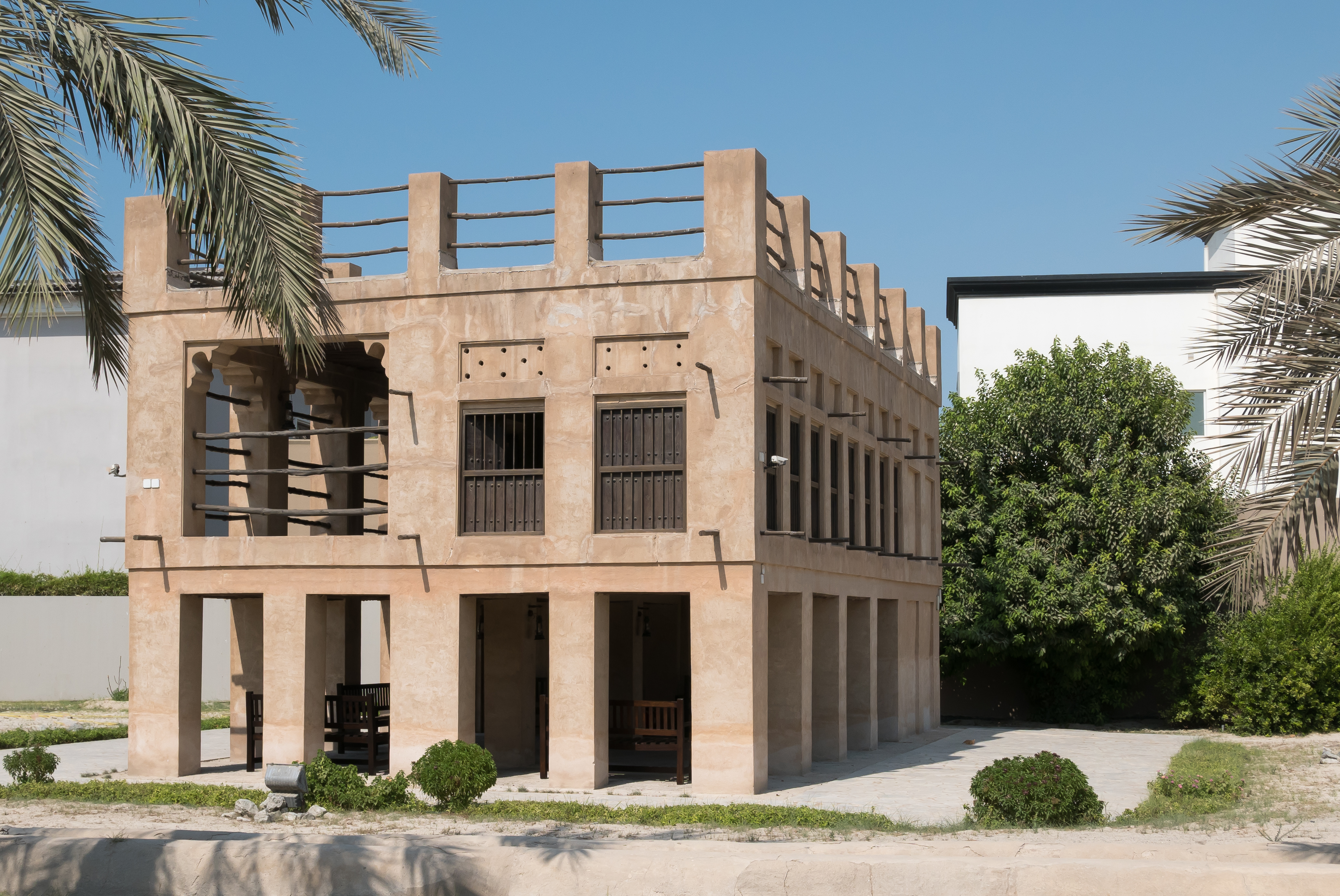
Majlis Ghorfat Umm Al Sheif (مَجْلِس غُرْفَة أُمّ ٱلشَّيْف)

Archaeological excavations at Jumeirah Archaeological Site, which was discovered in 1969, demonstrate that the area was inhabited as far back as the Abbasid era, approximately in the 10th century CE. Measuring about 80,000 m^{2} (860,000 sq ft), the site lay along a caravan route linking India and China to Oman and Iraq.

Historically, Emirati people living in Jumeirah were fishermen, pearl divers and traders. At the turn of the 20th century, it was a village of some 45 areesh (palm leaf) huts, inhabited mainly by settled Bedouin of the Bani Yas and Manasir tribes. At the time, Jumeirah was 'about 3 miles southwest of Dibai town'.

In modern times (1960 onwards), Jumeirah was the principal area for western expatriate residences. The beachfront area was previously called "Chicago Beach", as the site of the former Chicago Beach Hotel. The locale's peculiar name had its origins in the Chicago Bridge & Iron Company which at one time welded giant floating oil storage tankers called "Kazzans" on the site. The old name persisted for a time after the old hotel was demolished in 1997. "Dubai Chicago Beach Hotel" was the Public Project Name for the construction phase of the Burj Al Arab Hotel until Sheikh Mohammed bin Rashid Al Maktoum announced the new name: Burj Al Arab.

The Theatre of Digital Art (ToDA) opened in 2020 at Souk Madinat in Jumeirah as an exhibition space for digital art.

== Souk Madinat Jumeirah ==
Souk Madinat Jumeirah is a shopping and dining complex in Dubai, located within the Madinat Jumeirah resort on Al Sufouh Road.

It is designed after a traditional Arabian marketplace, with wooden-covered arcades, narrow alleyways and open courtyards set along a network of man-made canals. The souk faces the Burj Al Arab, and its waterfront terraces are known for their views of the hotel.

The complex has around 75 shops and galleries. They sell Arabian handicrafts, souvenirs, jewellery, perfumes and oud, as well as fashion and home décor, and bargaining is possible in some of them. There are also more than 20 restaurants and cafés serving a range of international cuisines, many with canal-side seating.

The souk’s other attractions include the 442-seat First Group Theatre, which stages musicals, plays and film screenings, and abra boat rides along the resort’s waterways.

Entry to the souk is free. It is within walking distance of the Madinat Jumeirah resort’s hotels, including Jumeirah Al Qasr, Jumeirah Mina A’Salam and Jumeirah Al Naseem

== See also ==
- Jumeirah Beach
- Jumeirah Beach Hotel
- Jumeira Baccalaureate School
- Palm Jumeirah
- Jumeirah Mosque
- City Walk
