= D89 =

D89 may refer to:

- D 89 road (United Arab Emirates)
- Grünfeld Defence, a chess opening
- HMS Colombo (D89), a C-class light cruiser of the Royal Navy
- HMS Exeter (D89), a Type 42 destroyer of the Royal Navy
- HMS Witch (D89), a modified W-class destroyer of the Royal Navy
