= Dubai International Airport =

Major international airport in Dubai, United Arab Emirates

Dubai International Airport مطار دبي الدولي

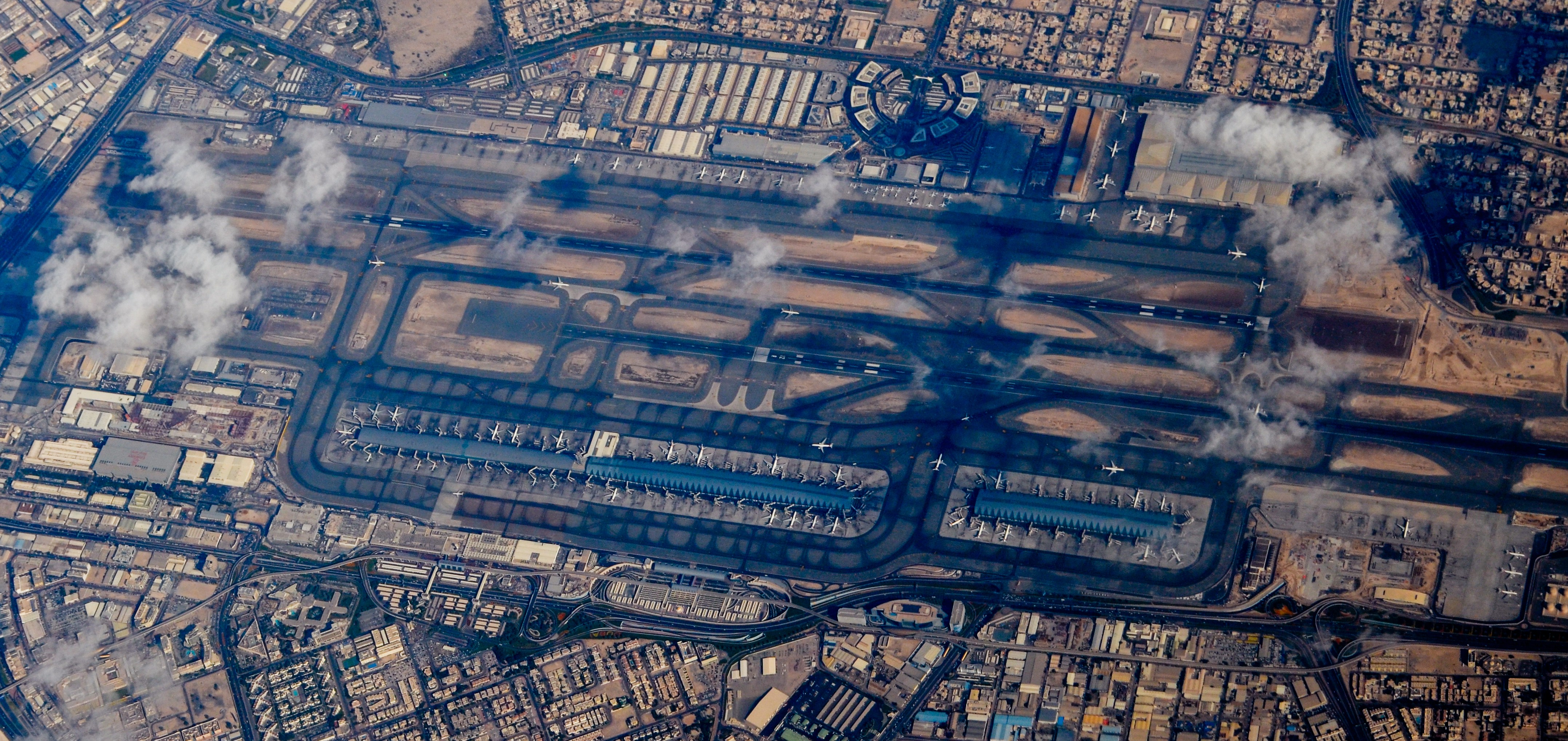
- Aerial view of Dubai International Airport
- IATA: DXB; ICAO: OMDB; WMO: 41194

Summary
- Airport type: Public
- Owner/Operator: Dubai Airports Company
- Serves: Emirate of Dubai
- Location: Al Garhoud, Dubai, UAE
- Opened: 30 September 1960; 66 years ago
- Hub for: Emirates; FedEx Express; flydubai
- Operating base for: Coyne Airways
- Elevation AMSL: 62 ft (19 m)
- Coordinates: 25°15′10″N 055°21′52″E
- Website: www.dubaiairports.ae

Maps
- Location in the UAE DXB/OMDB (Persian Gulf) DXB/OMDB (Middle East) DXB/OMDB (Asia)
- Interactive map of Dubai International Airport

Runways
Direction	Length		Surface
Direction	m	ft	Surface
12L/30R	4,351	14,275	Asphalt
12R/30L	4,447	14,590	Asphalt

Statistics (2025)
- Passengers: 95,200,000 (▲3.1%)
- Rank (world): 2nd
- Aircraft movements: 454,300 (▲3.3%)
- Cargo (metric tonnes): 2,200,000 (▲20.5%)
- Economic impact: $26.7 billion
- Sources: UAE AIP, ACI, SkyVector, DAC

Dubai International Airport (Arabic: مطار دبي الدولي; IATA: DXB, ICAO: OMDB) is the primary international airport serving Dubai, United Arab Emirates, and is the world's busiest airport by international passenger traffic as of 2025. It is also the busiest airport in the Middle East as of 2025, the second-busiest airport in the world by passenger traffic as of 2025, the busiest airport for Airbus A380 and Boeing 777 movements, and the airport with the highest average number of passengers per flight. In 2025, the airport handled over 95.2 million passengers, over 2.2 million tonnes of cargo and registered over 454,000 aircraft movements.

The airport is situated in the Al Garhoud district, 4.70 kilometres (2.92 mi) east of the city center of Dubai and spread over an area of 1,750 hectares (4,300 acres) of land. Terminal 3 is the fourth-largest building in the world by floor space and the largest airport terminal in the world. In July 2019, the airport installed the largest solar energy system in the region's airports as part of Dubai's goal to reduce 30 per cent of the city energy consumption by 2030.

Emirates' main hub is DXB. It is the primary operator from terminal 3, which consists of three concourses. The Emirates hub is the largest airline hub in the Middle East; Emirates handles 51% of all passenger traffic and accounts for approximately 42% of all aircraft movements at the airport. The airport is also the base for low-cost carrier Flydubai, which handles 13% of passenger traffic and 25% of aircraft movements at DXB. The airport has a total capacity of 115 million passengers annually. As of January 2025, over 8,500 weekly flights are operated by more than 100 airlines to over 270 destinations across all inhabited continents. Almost half of the travelers using the airport are connecting passengers.

In 2014, the airport indirectly supported over 400,000 jobs and contributed over US$26.7 billion to Dubai's economy, representing around 27% of Dubai's GDP and 21% of employment in the city.

DXB is planned to close once the expanded Al Maktoum International Airport (DWC) is fully operational; DWC will supersede DXB as Dubai's main airport.

== History ==
The history of civil aviation in Dubai started in July 1937 when an air agreement was signed for a flying boat base for aircraft of Imperial Airways with the rental of the base at about 440 rupees per month – this included the guards' wages. The Empire Flying Boats started operating once a week flying eastbound to Karachi from the UK and westbound to Southampton, England. By February 1938, there were four flying boats a week.

In the 1940s, flying from Dubai was by flying boats operated by British Overseas Airways Corporation (BOAC), operating the Horseshoe route from Southern Africa via the Persian Gulf to Sydney.

=== Construction ===
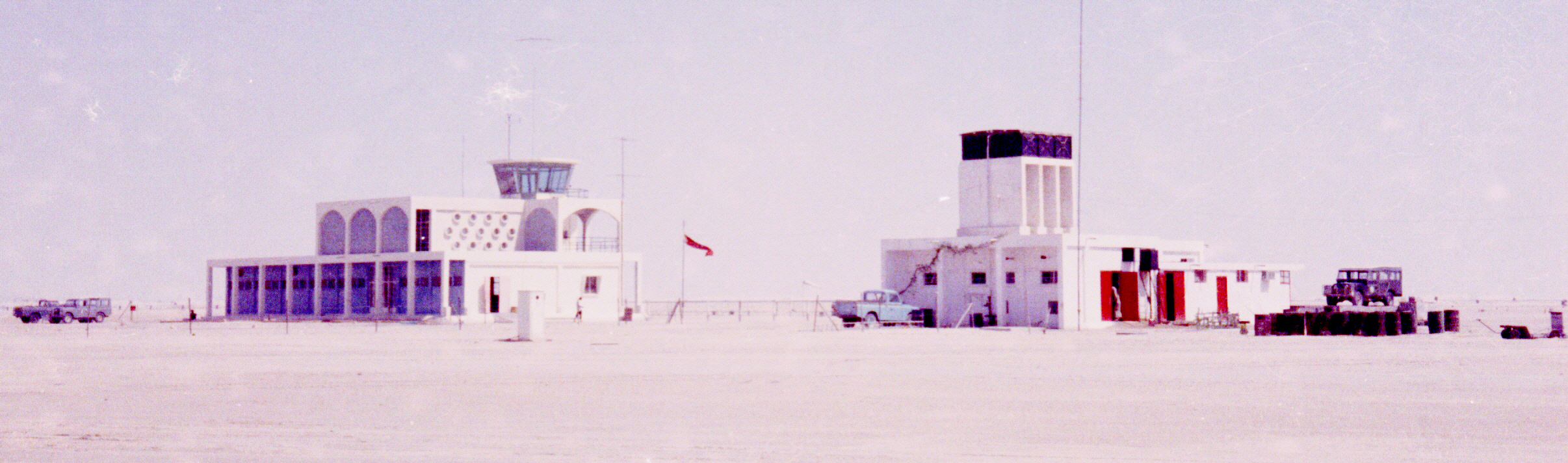
The airport's fire station and control tower seen from landside in 1965

Construction of the airport was ordered by the ruler of Dubai, Sheikh Rashid bin Saeed Al Maktoum, in 1959. It officially opened on 30 September 1960, at which time it was able to handle aircraft the size of a Douglas DC-3 on a 1,800-metre-long (5,900 ft) runway made of compacted sand. Three turning-areas, an apron and small terminal completed the airport that was constructed by Costain and designed by International Aeradio.

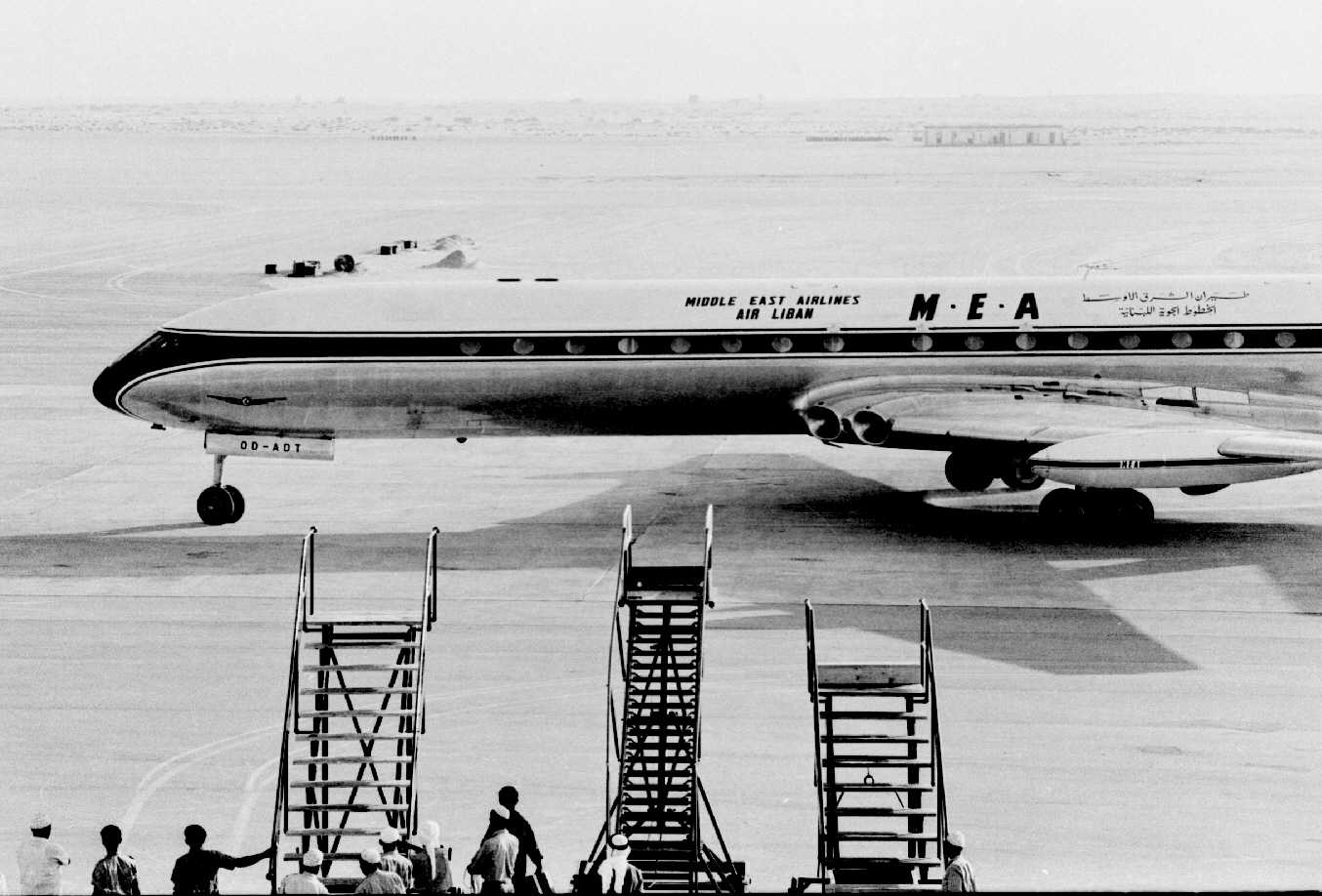
The first jet aircraft to land on the new runway at Dubai Airport in 1965 was a Comet from Middle East Airlines

In May 1963, construction of a 2,800-metre (9,200 ft) asphalt runway started. This new runway, alongside the original sand runway and taxiway opened in May 1965, together with several new extensions to the terminal Building, hangars were erected, and Airport and Navigational aids were installed. The installation of the lighting system continued after the official opening and was completed in August 1965. During the second half of the 1960s several extensions, equipment upgrades like a VHF omnidirectional range (VOR), an instrument landing system (ILS), and new buildings were constructed. By 1969, the airport was served by 9 airlines serving some 20 destinations.

The inauguration on 15 May 1966 was marked by the visits of the first big jets, De Havilland Comets of Middle East Airlines and Kuwait Airways.

The advent of wide-body aircraft required further airport development in the 1970s and plans for a new terminal, runways, and taxiways capable of coping with international flights were drawn up. The construction of a new terminal building (now Terminal 1) consisting of a three-story building 110 m (360 ft) long with an enclosed floor area of 13,400 m^{2} (144,000 sq ft). A new 28 m (92 ft) control tower was also constructed.

It consisted of a series of slender columns which at their tops spread to form squares and resemble stylized palm trees. The terminal also included four inclined piers which gave access to the apron via helical ramps at their outer ends. At the eastern end of the building was a golden dome-shaped VIP suite. In the terminal, passenger handling on the main, or first floor, operational services at ground level, and public lounges and restaurants on the top floor. This new terminal opened on 15 May 1971.

The original terminal building, which was opened in 1960, was abandoned after the construction of Terminal 1 in 1971 and was demolished in the early 1990s. The terminal was located a short way west of Terminal 1 and is now an aircraft parking area.

Expansion continued in the early 1970s including ILS Category II equipment, lengthening the existing runway to 3,800 m (12,500 ft), installation of a non-directional beacon (NDB), diesel generators, taxiways, etc. This work made handling the Boeing 747 and Concorde possible. Several runway and apron extensions were carried out through the decade to meet growing demand.

In 1971, the new precision category 2 Approach and Runway Lighting System was commissioned. The construction of the Airport Fire Station and the installation of the generators were completed in December 1971 and were fully operational in March 1972. The ruler of Dubai also commissioned and inaugurated the Long-range Surveillance System on 19 June 1973.

With the expansion of the Airport Fire Services, it became necessary to find more suitable hangars. A hangar-style building was made available for use at the end of 1976. This building was strategically located midway between the runway ends to facilitate efficient operations. Additionally, a new building was constructed to house the Airport Maintenance Engineer, Electronics Engineering section, and Stores unit.

In December 1978, expansion and refurbishment of the Airport Restaurant and Transit Lounge, including a new kitchen, were completed .

In April 1984, a new runway was completed three months ahead of schedule. This runway, located 360 metres north of and parallel to the existing runway, was equipped with the latest meteorological, airfield lighting, and instrument landing systems, giving the airport a Category II classification.

By this time the airport was served by 29 airlines.

Several extensions and upgrades were also made to the terminal facilities and supporting systems. In December 1980, the airport became an ordinary member of the Airports Council International (ACI). The decline of Karachi International Airport is often attributed to the traffic Dubai diverted from it.

In 1980, a new terminal and an expansion of the current terminal was planned, with the new terminal set to open in 1981. The new terminal never materialized, but the expansion of the current terminal went ahead.

During the 1980s, Dubai was a stopping point for airlines such as Air India, Cathay Pacific, Singapore Airlines, Malaysia Airlines, and others traveling between Asia and Europe that needed a refueling point in the Persian Gulf. This was made redundant with the availability of Russian airspace after the breakup of the Soviet Union, and the advent of longer-range aircraft introduced in the late 1980s and early 1990s, such as the Airbus A340, the Boeing 747-400 and the Boeing 777 series aircraft, which had the ability to fly between Europe and Southeast Asia nonstop. British Airways flights from Islamabad to Manchester also stopped for short times during the 1980s, with no requirement for passengers to get off.

=== Expansion ===
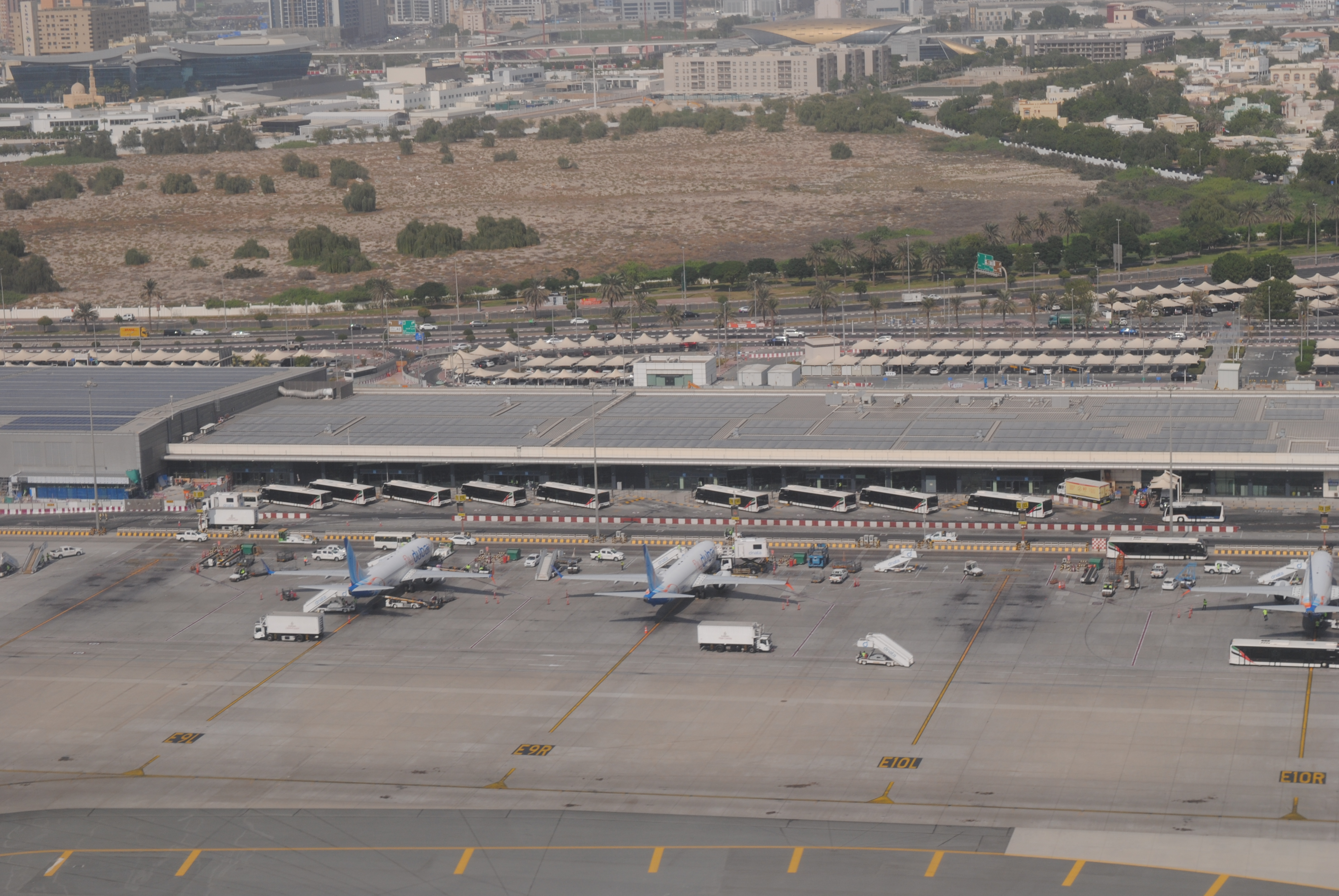
Part of Terminal 2, seen from a departing aircraft in October 2024

The opening of Terminal 2 in 1998 saw the first step of phase 1 of the new development master plan launched in 1997. In the second stage, Concourse 1 (now Concourse C), named Sheikh Rashid Terminal opened in April 2000. The concourse is 800 m (2,600 ft) in length connects to the check-in area via a 300 m (980 ft) tunnel containing moving walkways (conveyor belt/travelators). It also contains a hotel, business center, health club, exchanges, dining and entertainment facilities, internet services, a medical center, a post office, and a prayer room. The next step was runway reconfiguration, already part of phase 2, and aprons and taxiways were expanded and strengthened in 2003–2004. In addition, the Dubai Flower Centre opened in 2005 as part of the development. The airport saw the need for this as the city is a hub for the import and export of flowers and the airport required a specialist facility since flowers need special conditions.

By the 2000s, according to satellite imagery from the early 2000s, the original 12,500 feet runway had closed and was used as a taxiway and some of it was used as part of the apron of Concourse C. It was closed because of the construction of Concourse C in 1996–2000. The second runway, built in 1984 was shifted further east by 2007.

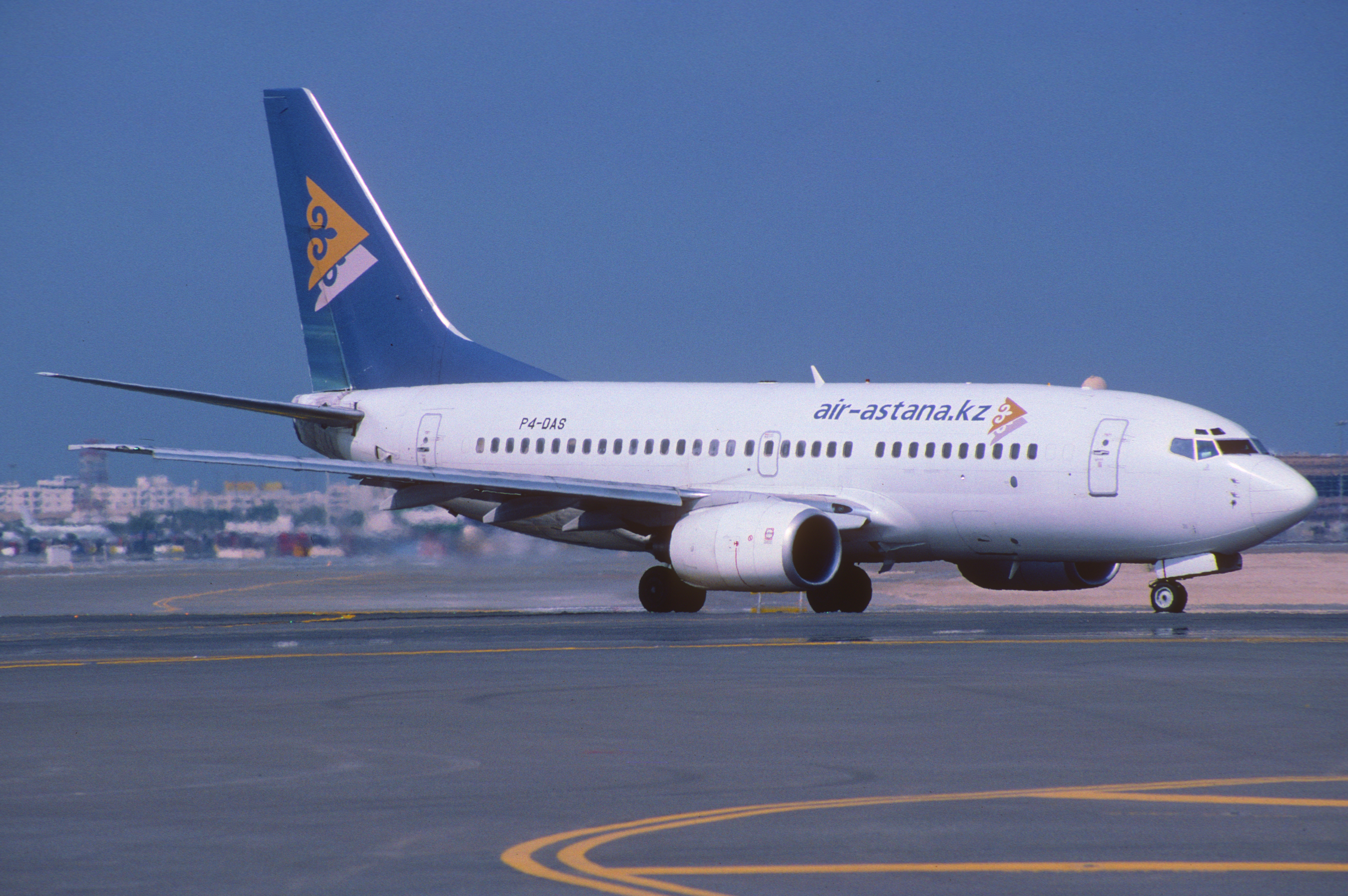
An Air Astana Boeing 737-700 taxiing at Dubai International Airport in 2005

In 2004, construction of Terminal 3 began as the next stage of phase 2 of the development, with an estimated cost of around $4.55 billion. Completion was originally planned for 2006 but was delayed by two years.

On 30 May 2008, a topping-out ceremony was conducted. The terminal became operational on 14 October 2008, with Emirates flight EK2926 from Jeddah, Saudi Arabia, being the first flight to arrive at the new terminal and EK843 to Doha, Qatar being the first departing flight. The terminal increased the airport's maximum annual passenger capacity by 47 million, bringing the total annual capacity to 75 million passengers.

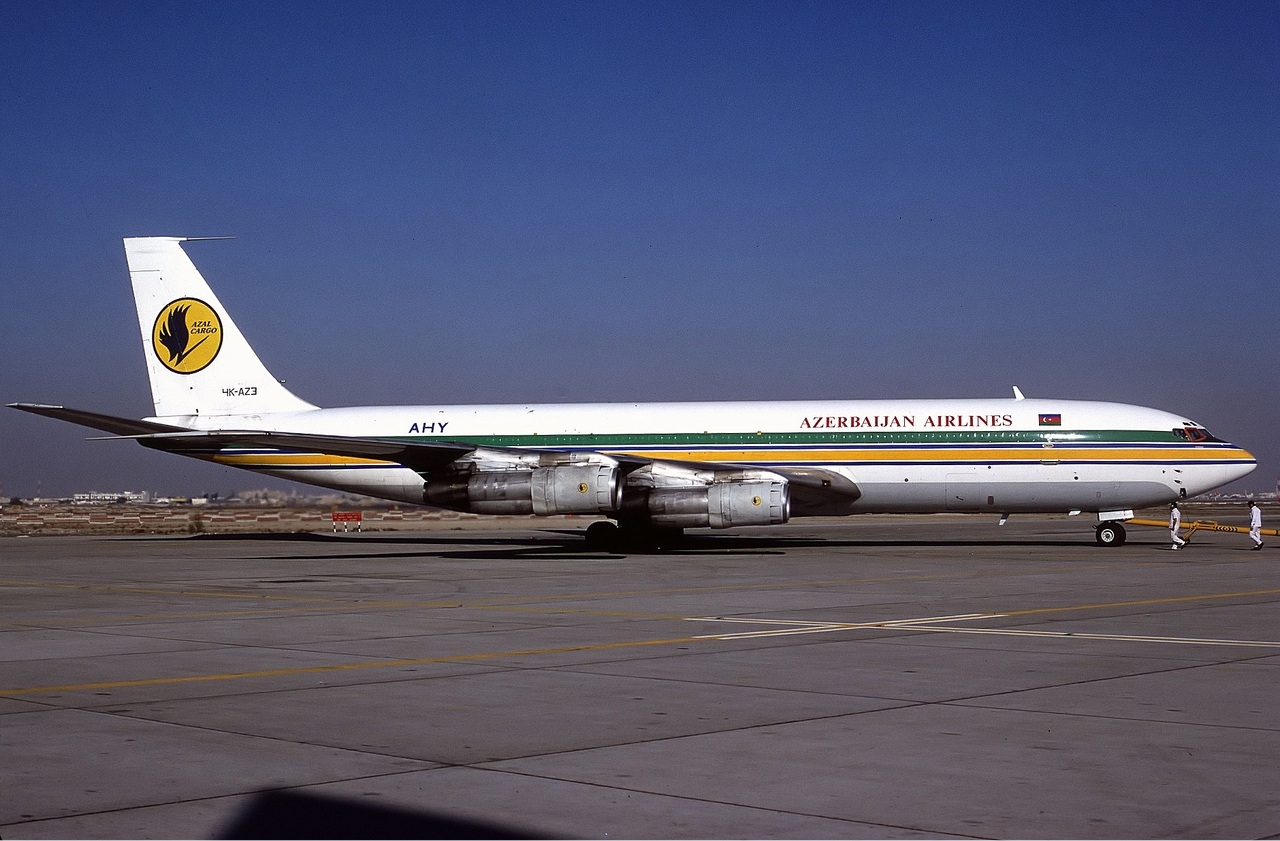
An Azerbaijan Airlines Boeing 707-300 parked at a remote stand at Dubai International Airport in 1995

On 29 October 2010, the airport marked its 50th anniversary. The airport has seen over 402 million passengers at an average annual growth rate of 15.5% and handled over 3.87 million aircraft at an average annual growth rate of 12.4%.

With the arrival of the Airbus A380, the airport made modifications costing $230 million. These included the building of 29 gates capable of handling large aircraft, five of which are in Terminal 3 and two are in Terminal 1. Other important projects at the airport include the next stage of phase 2 development, which includes the construction of Concourse 3. This will be a smaller version of Concourse 2, connected to Terminal 3.

As part of the expansion, the airport now handles at least 75 million passengers per annum, an increase of 19 million, with the opening of Concourse 3, part of Terminal 3. Recent communications predict a further increase to 80 million passengers with additional reassessments of existing capacities. In 2009, Terminal 2 expanded its facilities to handle 5 million passengers annually, an increase of 2 million, taking the airport's total capacity to 62 million passengers. Terminal 2 capacity was planned to bring the total capacity of the airport from the initial 75 million passengers, to 80 million passenger capacity by 2012.

The Cargo Mega Terminal, which will have the capacity to handle 3 million tonnes of cargo a year, is a major development. It will be built in the long term. The completion of the mega terminal will be no later than 2018. Terminal 2 will be completely redeveloped to match the status of the other two terminals. With all of these projects completed by 2013, the airport expects to handle at least 75–80 million passengers and over 5 million tonnes of cargo.

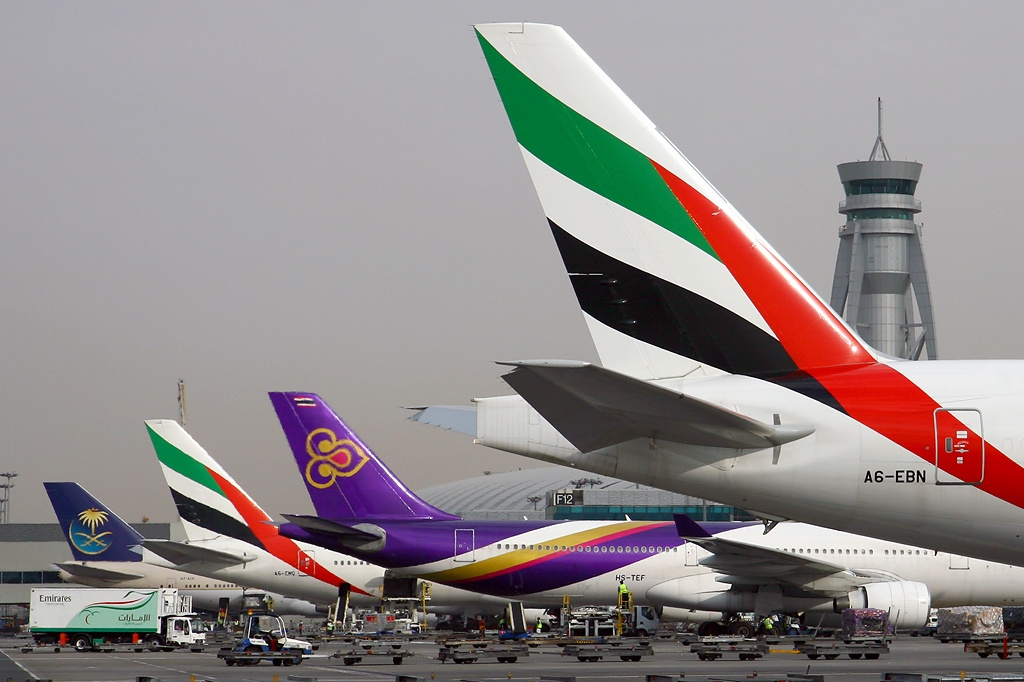
Aircraft parked at concourse C. Concourse C has a capacity of 33 million passengers

The airport's landside facilities were modified to allow the construction of two stations for the Red Line of Dubai Metro. One station was built at Terminal 1 and the other at Terminal 3. The line began service on 9 September 2009 and opened in phases over the next year. The second Metro line, the Green Line, runs near the Airport Free Zone and has served the airport's north-eastern area with the Terminal 2 starting in September 2011.

With phase 2 of DXB's expansion plan complete, the airport now has three terminals and three concourses, two cargo mega terminals, an airport-free zone, an expo center with three large exhibition halls, a major aircraft maintenance hub and a flower center to handle perishable goods. A phase 3 which has been included in the master plan involves the construction of a new Concourse 4.

The airport revealed its future plans in May 2011, which involve the construction of a new Concourse D for all airlines currently operating from Concourse C. Concourse D is expected to bring the total capacity of the airport to over 90 million passengers and will open in early 2016. The plan also involves Emirates solely operating from Concourse C along with Concourse A and B.

In September 2012, Dubai Airports changed the names of concourses to make it easier for passengers to navigate the airport. Concourse 1, in which over 100 international airlines operate, became Concourse C (C1-C50). Concourse 2 became Concourse B (B1-B32) and Concourse 3 became Concourse A (A1-A24). The gates in Terminal 2 were changed and are now numbered F1 to F12. The remaining alpha-numeric sequences are being reserved for future airport facilities that are part of the Dubai Airports' $7.8 billion expansion programm, including Concourse D.

In December 2024, CEO Paul Griffiths declared that Dubai International Airport is rapidly expanding, with plans to enhance passenger experiences through advanced technologies like facial recognition and a focus on reducing wait times while maximizing shopping opportunities. He highlighted a $35 billion expansion of Dubai World Central, aiming to create smaller, more intimate airport experiences within a vast complex, ultimately positioning it to become the world's largest airport.

Summary of Dubai International Airport Masterplan
Phase	Year	Description
Phase 1	1997	Initial capacity of 11 million passengers per annum. $540 million phase 1 launched.
Phase 1	1998	Terminal 2 inaugurated on 1 May 1998, to alleviate congestion from Terminal 1, with a capacity of 2.5 million passengers annually.
Phase 1	2000	Sheikh Rashid Terminal (Concourse C) – reopened 15 April 2000. Capable of handling 22 million passengers per annum.
Phase 2
Phase 2	2002	$4.5 bn ($545 m for the civils on T3 and concourse projects) launched.
Phase 2	2003	Taxiways were strengthened. In addition, work on other taxiways in the area was expanded to complete the work associated with the newly commissioned second runway.
Phase 2	2005	Construction of Dubai Flower Centre completed.
Phase 2	2005	US$225 million VIP Pavilion for the Dubai Royal Wing opens in July.
Phase 2	2008	Capable of handling 60 million passengers per annum with the opening of Terminal 3 – Concourse B
Phase 2	2012	Extensions to Terminal 2 are completed – new check-in hall, departure area, and extensions to the terminal building.
Phase 2	2013	New Concourse A constructed, enabling the airport to have a capacity of 80 million
Phase 2	2016	Concourse D will be completed with a capacity of 15 million passengers. All airlines currently operating from concourse C will move to D.
General Expansion	2004–2008	Includes construction of Emirates Flight Catering Centre, Emirates Engineering Facility.
General Expansion	2006	Opening of Emirates Engineering Facility – largest aircraft hangars in the world.
General Expansion	2007	Opening of Emirates Flight Catering Centre, capable of producing 115,000 meals per day.
General Expansion	2008	New Executive Flights Centre facility launched.
General Expansion	2014	Runway refurbishment and upgrades after an 80-day project which ran from 1 May to 20 July 2014. During this period, DXB operated with one single runway. New LED lighting replaced the old tungsten runway lights and new taxiways were constructed enabling an increase in runway capacity.
General Expansion	2015	Terminal 2 capacity increased to 10 million after the expansion was completed.

Dubai's government announced the construction of a new airport in Jebel Ali, named Dubai World Central – Al Maktoum International Airport. It is expected to be the second-largest airport in the world by physical size, though not by passenger metrics. It opened 27 June 2010. Construction is expected to finish in 2027. The airport is expected to be able to accommodate up to 160 million passengers.

There is a plan to build the Dubai Metro Purple Line to connect Al Maktoum International Airport to Dubai International Airport. Construction was set to begin in 2012. The proposed 52 km (32 mi) Purple Line will link Dubai International Airport and Al Maktoum International Airport.

Concourse D opened in February 2016 for all international airlines and moved out of Terminal 1. Emirates now operates from Concourses A, B, and C, all under Terminal 3. while FlyDubai operates from Terminal 2 (Concourse F).

Growth in traffic at Dubai International Airport
Airlines	1990	1994	1998	2002	2006	2010	2014
Passenger movements	4.347 million	6.299 million	9.732 million	15.973 million	28.788 million	47.181 million	70.476 million
Airfreight movements (tonnes)	144,282	243,092	431,777	764,193	1.410 million	2.19 million	2.37 million
City links	36	54	110	170	195	210	240
Weekly scheduled flights	N/A	N/A	2,350	2,850	4,550	6,100	7,500
Airlines	N/A	N/A	80	102	113	135	140

On 20 December 2018 the airport celebrated its one billionth passenger.

In April 2024, the airport was submerged in water by floods and suffered extensive damage.

=== Iranian strikes ===
The airport was significantly impacted as a result of the ongoing Iran War with flights either delayed or cancelled. On 28 February 2026, the airport's airspace was closed after Iran launched airstrikes against Dubai. Operations were completely suspended. The airport itself was later damaged by Iranian strikes. Four people were injured at the airport. On 2 March, the airport has resumed operation with a limited number of flights. On 7 March, the airport again suspended operations following Iranian drone strikes. As of 31 March, the airport is in limited operation due to security concerns.

It was reported that a decline about 31% in passenger traffic in the second quarter of 2026 as the Iran war disrupted air travel across the Middle East.

== Air traffic ==
=== Main airlines based at DXB ===
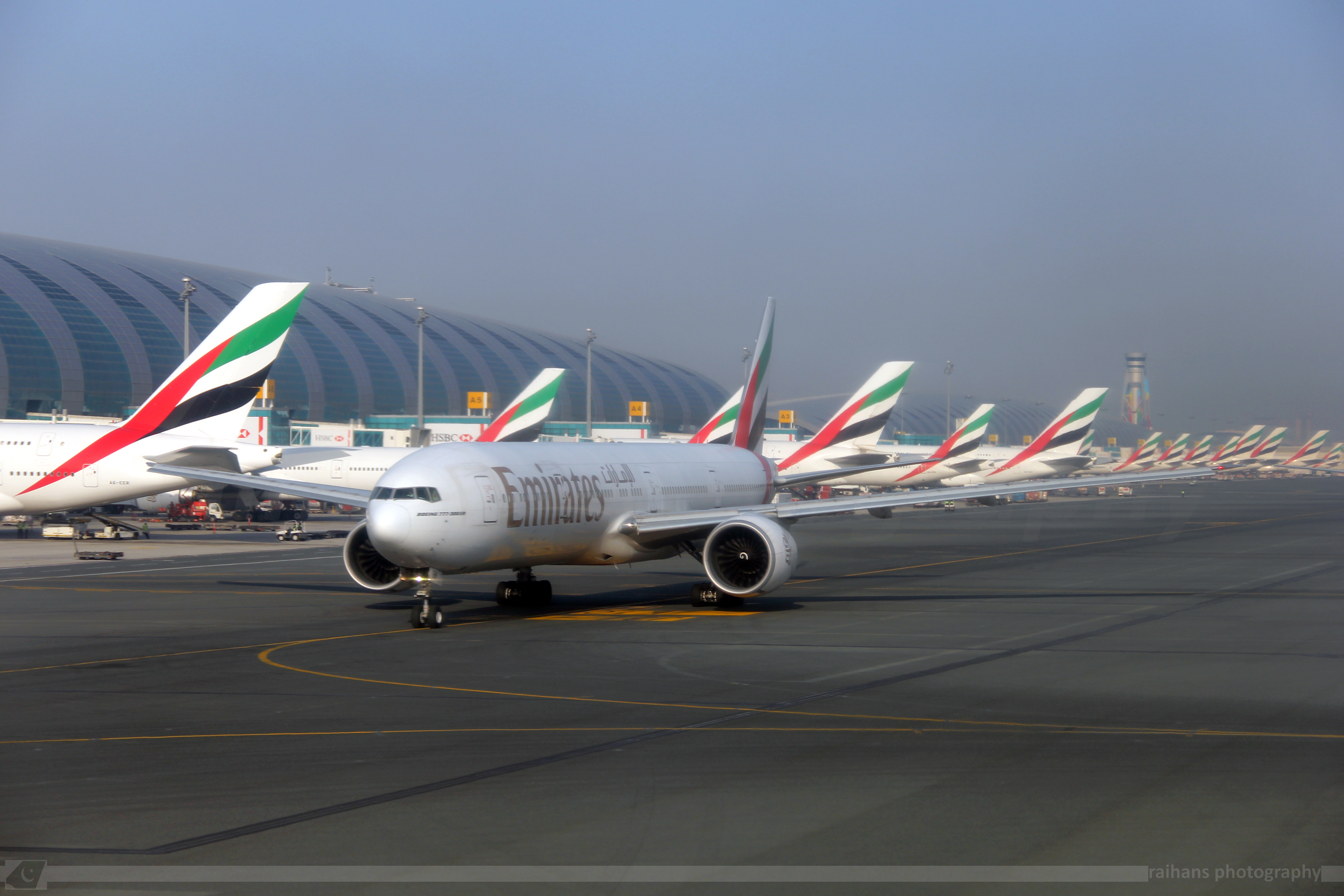
Emirates operations at Dubai International

- Emirates is the largest airline operating at the airport, with an all-wide-body fleet of over 200 Airbus and Boeing aircraft based at Dubai, providing scheduled services to, Africa, Asia, Europe, North America, South America, Australia and New Zealand. It operates out of Terminal 3, Concourses A, B and C.
- Flydubai, a low-cost airline planning to operate over 100 aircraft on scheduled passenger services to and from Dubai, to the Middle East, Africa, Europe and South Asia. It operates from Terminal 2 and, since December 2018, also from Terminal 3 for selected destinations.

Recreational flying to Dubai is catered for by the Dubai Aviation Club, which undertakes flying training for private pilots and provides facilities for private owners.

The Government of Dubai provides short and long-range search and rescue services, police support, medical evacuation, and general-purpose flights for the airport and all VIP flights to the airport.

== Statistics ==
Tables shown the historical statistics of Dubai International Airport are shown below:

Year	Passengers	Cargo (tonnes)
1970	242,361	11,774
1975	987,673	14,958
1976	1,309,067	51,885
1977	1,675,236	34,604
1978	2,066,048	N/A

Operations and statistics
Year	Passengers	Airfreight (tonnes)	Aircraft
2003	18,062,344	928,758	148,334
2004	21,711,883	1,111,647	168,511
2005	23,607,507	1,333,014	195,820
2006	28,788,726	1,410,963	217,165
2007	34,340,000	1,668,505	260,530
2008	37,441,440	1,824,991	
2009	40,901,752	1,927,520	
2010	47,180,628	2,270,498	292,662
2011	50,977,960	2,199,750	326,317
2012	57,684,550	2,279,624	344,245
2013	66,431,533	2,435,567	369,953
2014	70,475,636	2,367,574	357,339
2015	78,014,841	2,506,092	406,625
2016	83,654,250	2,592,454	418,220
2017	88,242,099		
2018	89,149,387		
2019	86,396,757		
2020	18,229,461		
2021	29,110,609		
2022	66,069,981		
2023	86,994,365	1,805,898	416,405
2024	92,300,000	2,200,000	440,300
2025	95,200,000		454,800

== Infrastructure ==
Airport layout

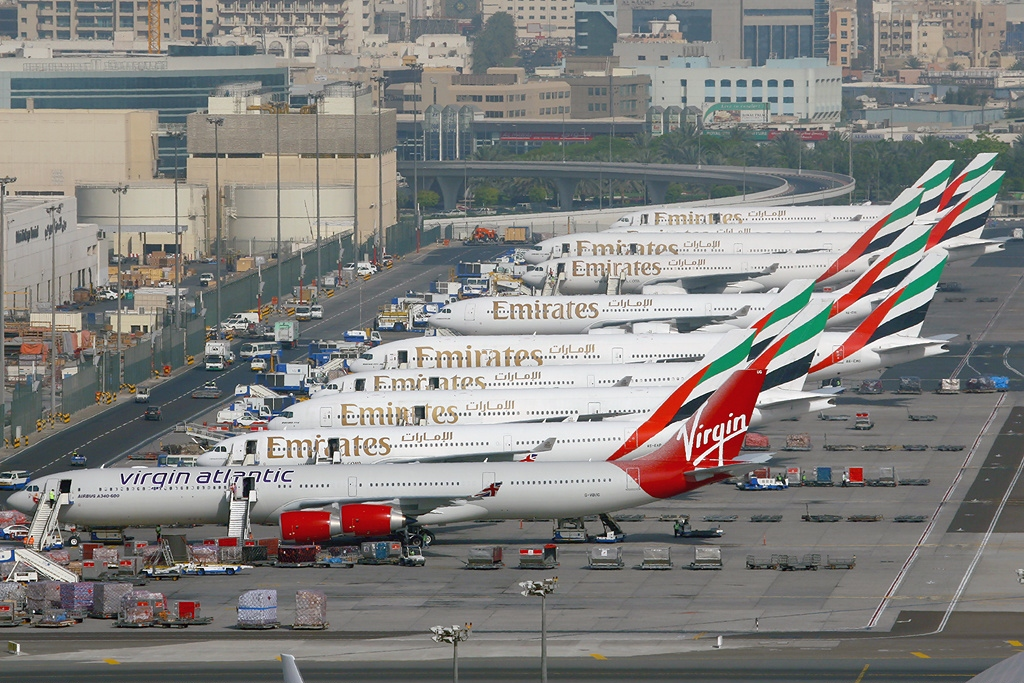
Aircraft parked at remote stands at DXB

Dubai International Airport was conceptualized to function as Dubai's primary airport and the region's busiest for the foreseeable future without the need for relocation or the building of another airport when passenger figures increased. The area was chosen near Dubai, to attract passengers from the city of Dubai, rather than travel to the busier Sharjah International Airport. The planned location originally was Jebel Ali.

The original master plan for the existing airport initially involved a dual-terminal and one runway configuration over two phases with provisions for another two passenger terminals in the near future. Phase 1 included the construction of the first passenger terminal, the first runway, 70 aircraft parking bays, support facilities, and structures, including large maintenance hangar, the first fire station, workshops, and administrative offices, an airfreight complex, two cargo agents' buildings, in-flight catering kitchens and an 87 m (285 ft) control tower. Construction for the second phase would commence immediately after the completion of Phase 1 and include the second runway, 50 new aircraft parking bays in addition to the existing 70 bays, a second fire station, and a third cargo agent building.

The third phase included the construction of a new terminal (now the parts of Terminal 1's main building and Concourse C) and an additional 60 parking bays, as well as a new aircraft maintenance facility. Then, in the early 2000s (decade) a new master plan was introduced which began the development of the current concourses and terminal infrastructure.

Paul Griffiths (Dubai Airports' CEO) in his interview with Vision magazine, cited plans to build infrastructure to support the expansion of Emirates and budget airline flydubai and ascend the ranks of global aviation hubs.

=== Control tower ===
The 87-metre-tall (285 ft) airport traffic control tower (ATCT) was constructed as part of phase two of the development plan.

=== Terminals ===
Dubai International Airport has three terminals. Terminal 1 has one concourse (Concourse D), Terminal 2 is set apart from the other two main buildings and Terminal 3 is divided into Concourse A, B, and C. The cargo terminal is capable of handling 3 million tonnes of cargo annually and a general aviation terminal (GAT) is close by.

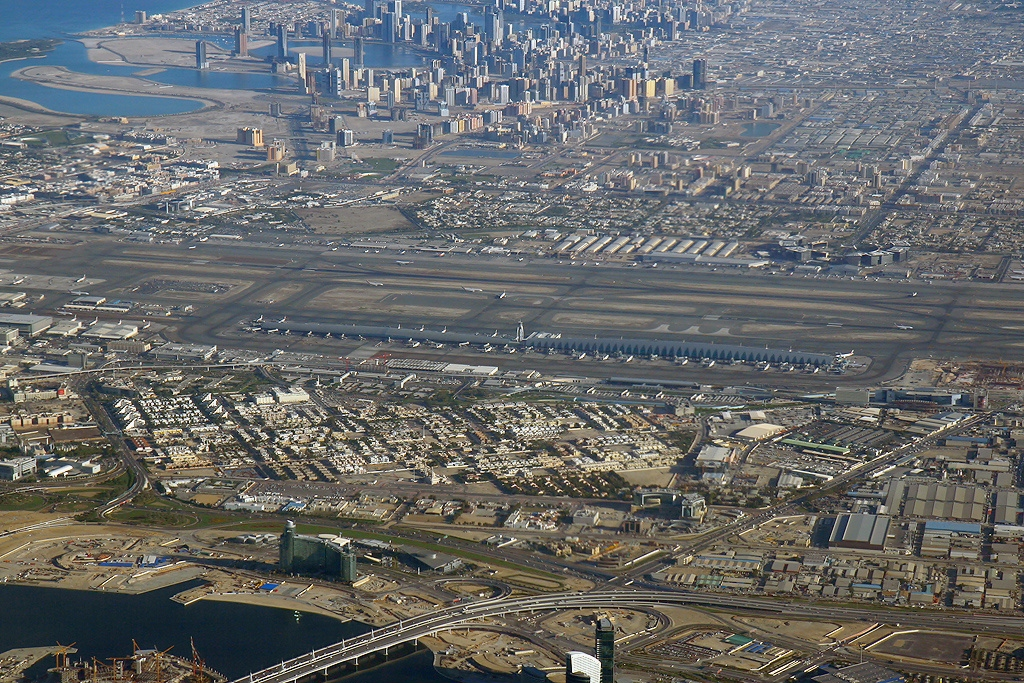
Aerial view of concourse B and C. Concourse A (not shown) is connected to Terminal 3 via Terminal 3 APM. Concourse D is also connected to Terminal 1 via Terminal 1 APM

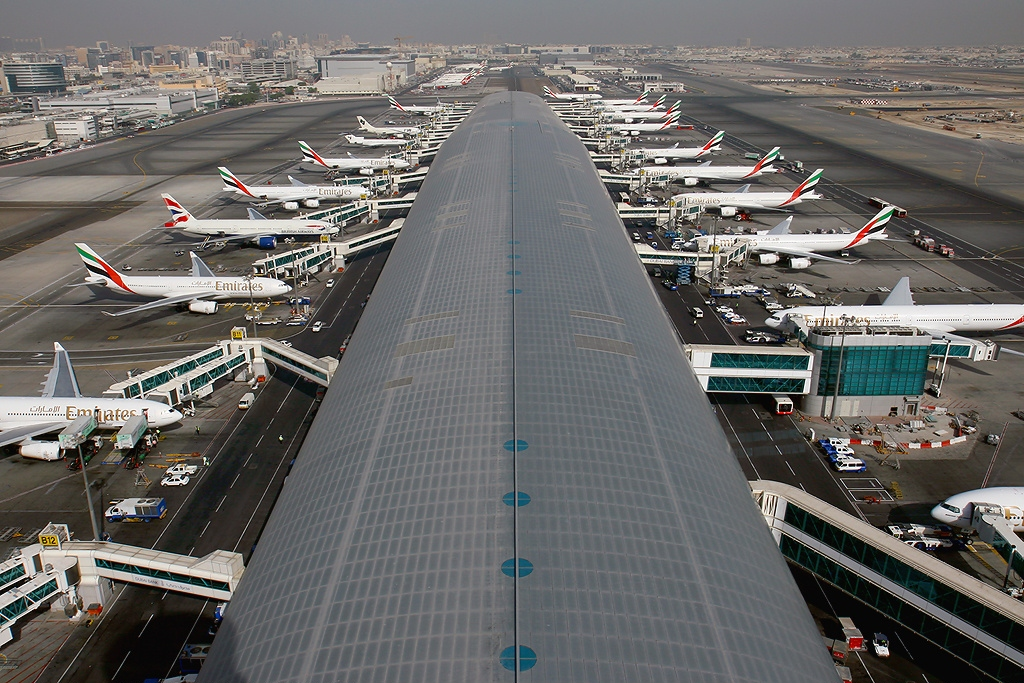
Aircraft parked at Concourse C before most of Emirates' operations moved to Concourse B. Emirates took over operations of Concourse C in 2016 as all airlines operating from Concourse C moved to Concourse D

=== Passenger terminals ===
Dubai Airport has three passenger terminals. Terminals 1 and 3 are directly connected with a common transit area, with airside passengers being able to move freely between the terminals without going through immigration, while Terminal 2 is on the opposite side of the airport. For transiting passengers, a shuttle service runs between the terminals, with a journey time of around 20 minutes from Terminal 2 to Terminal 1 and 30 minutes to Terminal 3. Passengers in Terminal 3 who need to transfer between Concourse A and the rest of the Terminal have to travel via an automated people mover. Also after early 2016 when the construction of Concourse D was done, there is now an automated people mover between concourse D and Terminal 1.

Situated beside Terminal 2 is the Executive Flights Terminal, which has its own check-in facilities for premium passengers and where transportation to aircraft in any of the other terminals is by personal buggy.

The three passenger terminals have a total handling capacity of around 80 million passengers a year.

Terminals 1 and 3 cater to international passengers, handling about 85% of the passenger traffic, Terminal 2 is for budget passengers and passengers flying to the Indian subcontinent and Persian Gulf region, and the Executive Flights terminal is for the higher-end travelers and important guests.

==== Terminal 1 ====
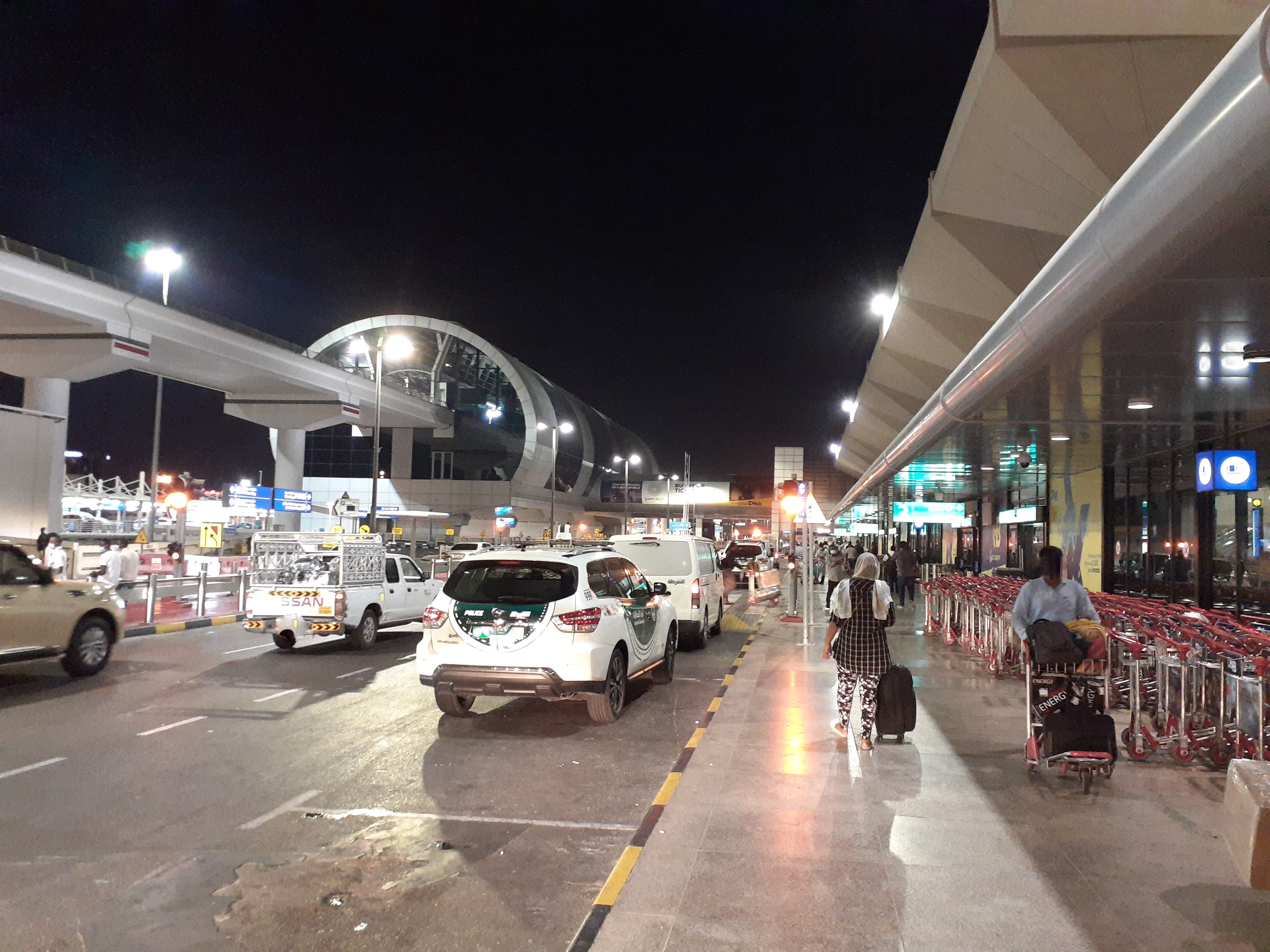
Outside DXB Terminal 1

Terminal 1 has a capacity of 45 million passengers. It is used by over 100 airlines and is connected to Concourse D by an automated people mover. It is spread over an area of 520,000 m^{2} (5,600,000 sq ft) and offers 221 check-in counters.

The terminal opened in 1971 as a three-story terminal building with a VIP lounge, 4 piers and 3 floors. The original building featured ogee arches, and still does today, but the piers and domed VIP lounge no longer exist.

The Terminal was originally built within the airport's old building to handle 18 million passengers; however, with extreme congestion at the terminal, the gates were relocated to the newly built Concourse D.

In 2013, Dubai Airports announced a major renovation for Terminal 1 and Concourse C. The renovations include upgraded baggage systems, replacement of check-in desks and a more spacious departure hall. Arrivals will also see improvements to help reduce waiting times. The renovation was completed by the middle of 2015.

===== Concourse D =====
On 14 November 2008, the day Emirates completed its phased operations at the new Terminal 3, plans for the construction of a Terminal 4 was announced by Dubai Airport officials, as well as additional extensions to Terminal 3. They expected to bring the capacity of the airport to 80–90 million passengers a year by 2015.

In May 2011, Paul Griffiths, chief executive of Dubai Airports, revealed a new Dubai Airport masterplan. Terminal 4 would now be built as Concourse D with a capacity of 15 million, bringing the total capacity of the airport to 90 million passengers by 2018. It also gave Emirates exclusive operations at Concourses A, B, and C. All remaining airlines would either move to Concourse D or Al Maktoum International Airport. The airport projected that international passenger and cargo traffic would increase at an average annual growth rate of 7.2% and 6.7%, respectively, and that by 2020 passenger numbers at Dubai International Airport would reach 98.5 million, and cargo volumes would top 4.1 million tonnes.

Concourse D has a capacity of 15 million passengers, includes 17 gates, and is connected to Terminal 1 via an automated people mover. On 6 February 2016, members of the public were invited to tour the concourse in preparation for its opening. On Wednesday, 24 February 2016, Concourse D officially opened with the first British Airways flight arriving at gate D8.

Concourse D and Terminal 1 reopened on 24 June 2021 following a year's closure due to the COVID-19 pandemic.

==== Terminal 2 ====
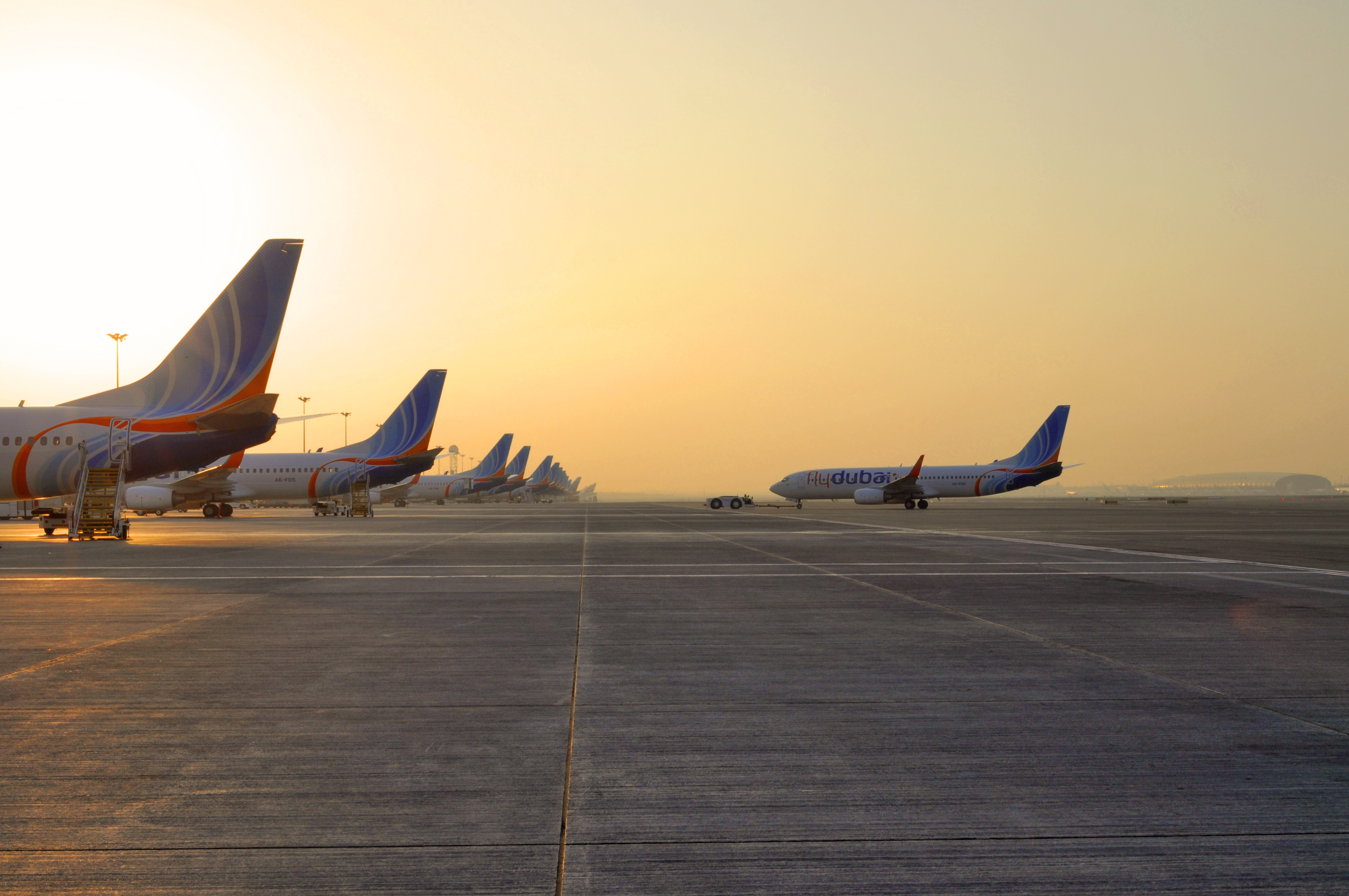
FlyDubai aircraft parked at Terminal 2 aircraft stands

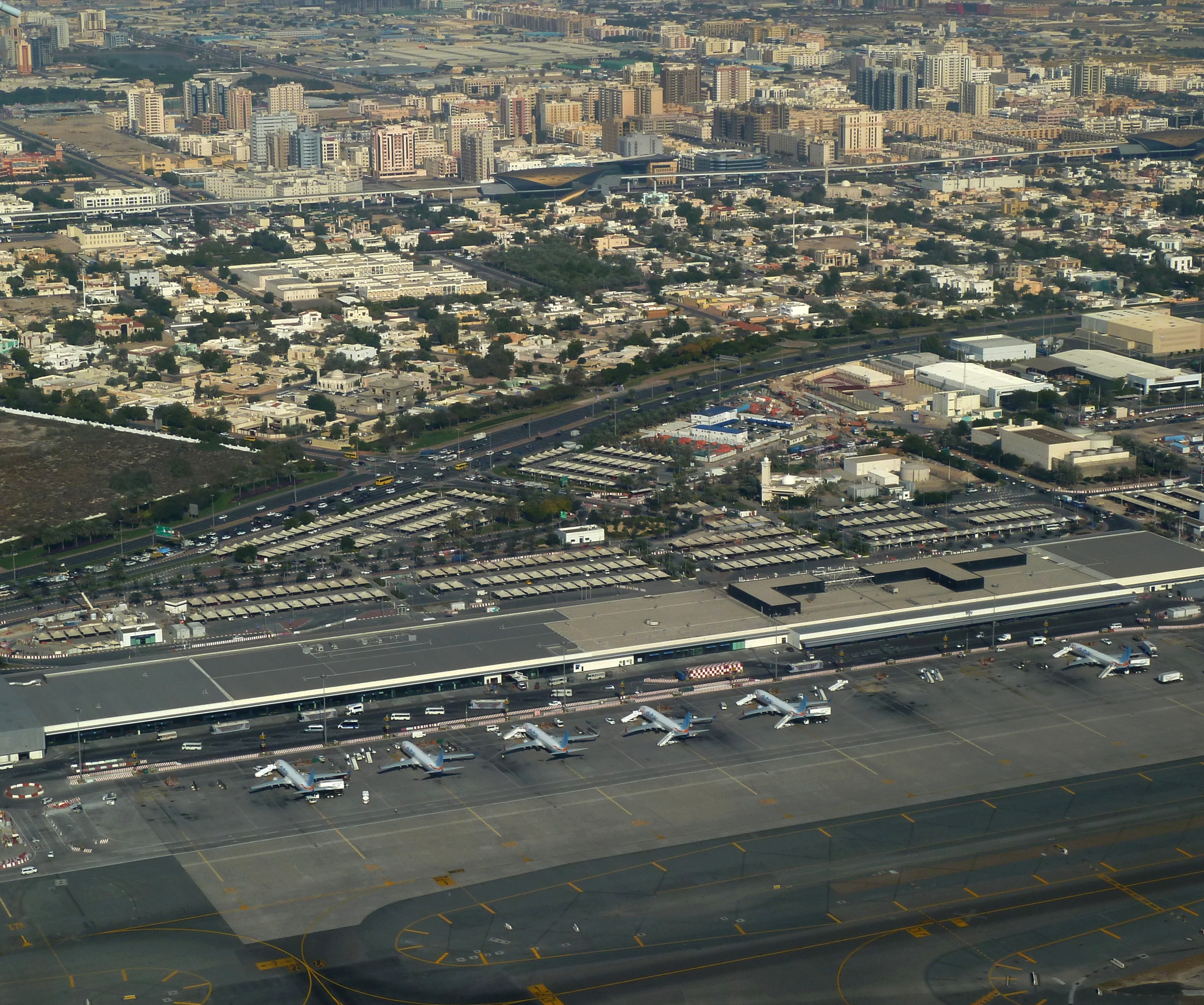
Terminal 2

Terminal 2, built in 1998, has an area of 47,000 m^{2} (510,000 sq ft) and has a capacity of 10 million as of 2013, after several, decent reconstructions and a major expansion in 2012 which saw capacity double. It is used by over 50 airlines, mainly operating in the Persian Gulf region. Most flights operate to India, Saudi Arabia, Iran, Afghanistan and Pakistan.

In June 2009, Terminal 2 became a hub for Air India Express and flydubai, and the terminal houses the airline's corporate head office.

Terminal 2 has undergone a major refurbishment recently, extending check-in and boarding facilities, changing the interior and exterior décor, and offering more dining choices to passengers. Capacity was increased to allow for 10 million passengers, an increase of 5 million.

The terminal has now increased the number of facilities available to passengers. Check-in counters have increased to 37. The boarding area is more spacious, with more natural light. Also, the new open boarding gates allow several flights to board simultaneously, improving passenger and aircraft movements. There are a total of 43 remote stands at the terminal. However, passengers cannot move between Terminal 2 to 1 or from 2 to 3 and vice versa inside the airport. They have to make use of Taxi services or public transport available outside.

The Dubai duty-free shopping area covers 2,400 m^{2} (26,000 sq ft) in departures and 540 m^{2} (5,800 sq ft) in arrivals. The 3,600-square-metre (39,000 sq ft) extension included a larger arrivals hall as well.

Terminal 2 has no jetbridges and so passengers are bussed to the aircraft at gates F1-F12.

==== Terminal 3 ====
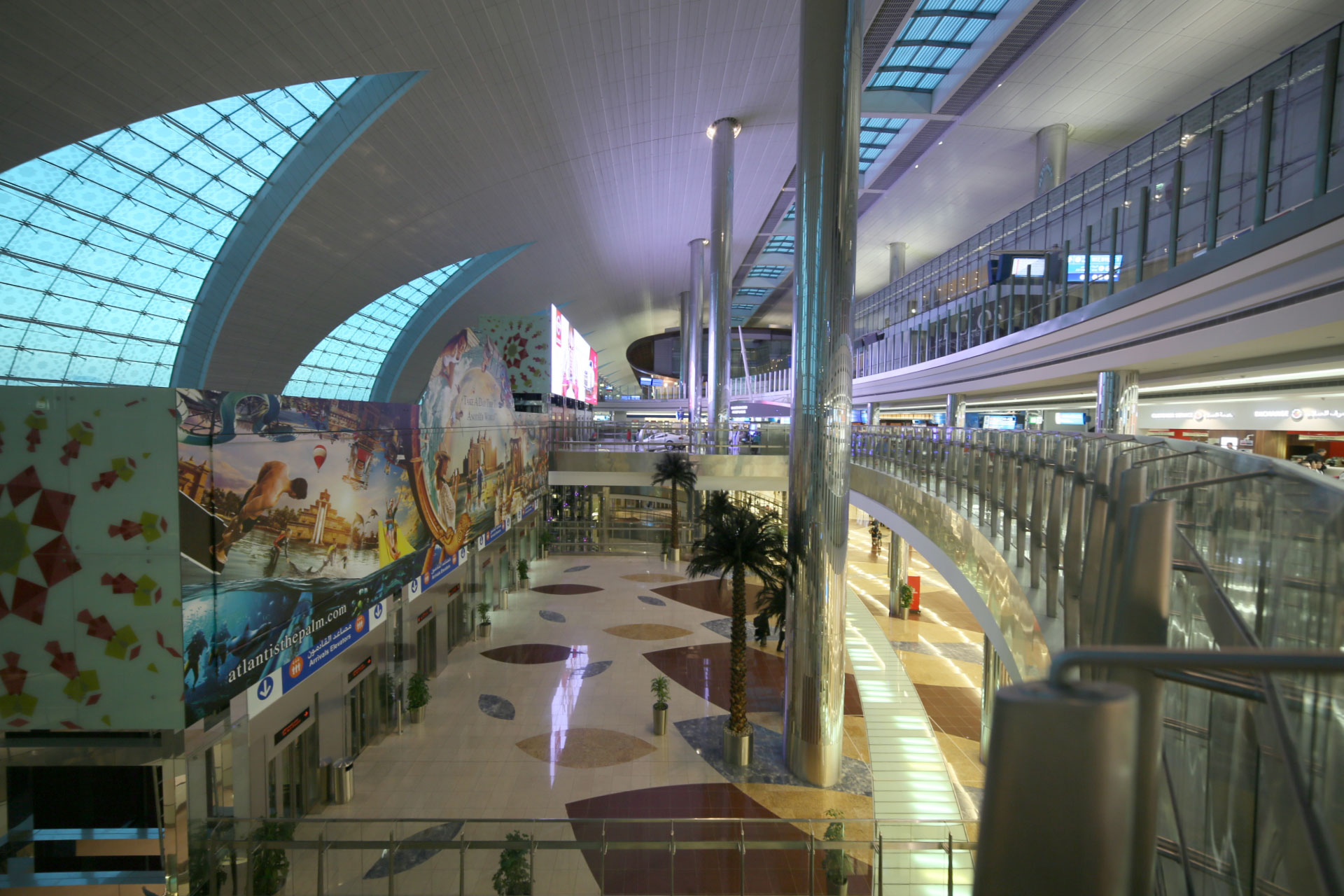
Interior of Terminal 3

The partly underground Terminal 3 was built at a cost of US$4.5 billion, exclusively for Emirates, and has a capacity of 65 million passengers. The terminal has 20 Airbus A380 gates at Concourse A, 5 at Concourse B, and 2 at Concourse C. It was announced on 6 September 2012 that Terminal 3 would no longer be Emirates-exclusive, as Emirates and Qantas had set up an extensive code-sharing agreement. Qantas would be the second and only one of two airlines to fly in and out of Terminal 3. This deal also allows Qantas to use the A380 dedicated concourse. Qantas services to and from Dubai ceased in 2018 in favour of a Singapore stopover instead. flydubai, Emirates' low cost subsidiary also currently operates certain selected routes, including most European destinations, to and from Terminal 3.

In March 2023, United began services from Newark to Dubai, operating out of Terminal 3, becoming the only airline other than Emirates and flydubai to currently operate out of the terminal.

Upon completion, Terminal 3 was the largest building in the world by floor space, with over 1,713,000 m^{2} (18,440,000 sq ft) of space, capable of handling 60 million passengers in a year. A large part is located under the taxiway area and is directly connected to Concourse B: the departure and arrival halls in the new structure are 10 m (33 ft) beneath the airport's apron. Concourse A is connected to the terminal via a Terminal 3 APM. It has been operational since 14 October 2008, and opened in four phases to avoid collapse of baggage handling and other IT systems.

The building includes a multi-level underground structure, first and business class lounges, restaurants, 180 check-in counters, and 2,600 car-parking spaces. The terminal offers more than double the previous retail area of Concourse C, by adding about 4,800 m^{2} (52,000 sq ft) and Concourse B's 10,700 m^{2} (115,000 sq ft) of shopping facilities.

In arrivals, the terminal contains 72 immigration counters and 14 baggage carousels. The baggage handling system—the largest system and also the deepest in the world—has a capacity to handle 8,000 bags per hour. The system includes 21 screening injection points, 49 make-up carousels, 90 km (56 mi) of conveyor belts capable of handling 15,000 items per hour at a speed of 27 km/h (17 mph) and 4,500 early baggage storage positions.

===== Concourse A =====
Concourse A opened on 2 January 2013 with a capacity of 19 million passengers and is connected to the two major public levels of Terminal 3 via Terminal 3 APM in addition to the vehicular and baggage handling system utility tunnels for further transfer. The concourse opened on 2 January 2013 and was built at a cost of US$3.3 billion. The building, which follows the characteristic shape of Concourse B, 924 m (3,031 ft) long, 91 m (299 ft) wide and 40 m (130 ft) high in the centre from the apron level and accommodates 20 air bridge gates, of which all are capable of handling the Airbus A380-800. There are also 6 remote lounges for passengers departing on flights parked at 13 remote stands. The gates in Concourse A are labeled A1–A24. Gates A6, A7, A18, and A19 are not equipped with jetbridges and so passengers departing from these gates are bussed to the aircraft.

The concourse includes one 4-star hotel and one 5-star hotel, first- and business-class lounges, and duty-free areas. The total built-up area is 540,000 m^{2} (5,800,000 sq ft). The concourse allows for multi-level boarding and boasts the largest first and business class lounges in the world. Each lounge has its own dedicated floor offering direct aircraft access from the lounges. The total amount of retail space at the concourse is 11,000 m^{2} (120,000 sq ft), and there is also a total of 14 cafes and restaurants.

The total retail area in the concourse is approximately 11,000 m^{2} (120,000 sq ft).

===== Concourse B =====
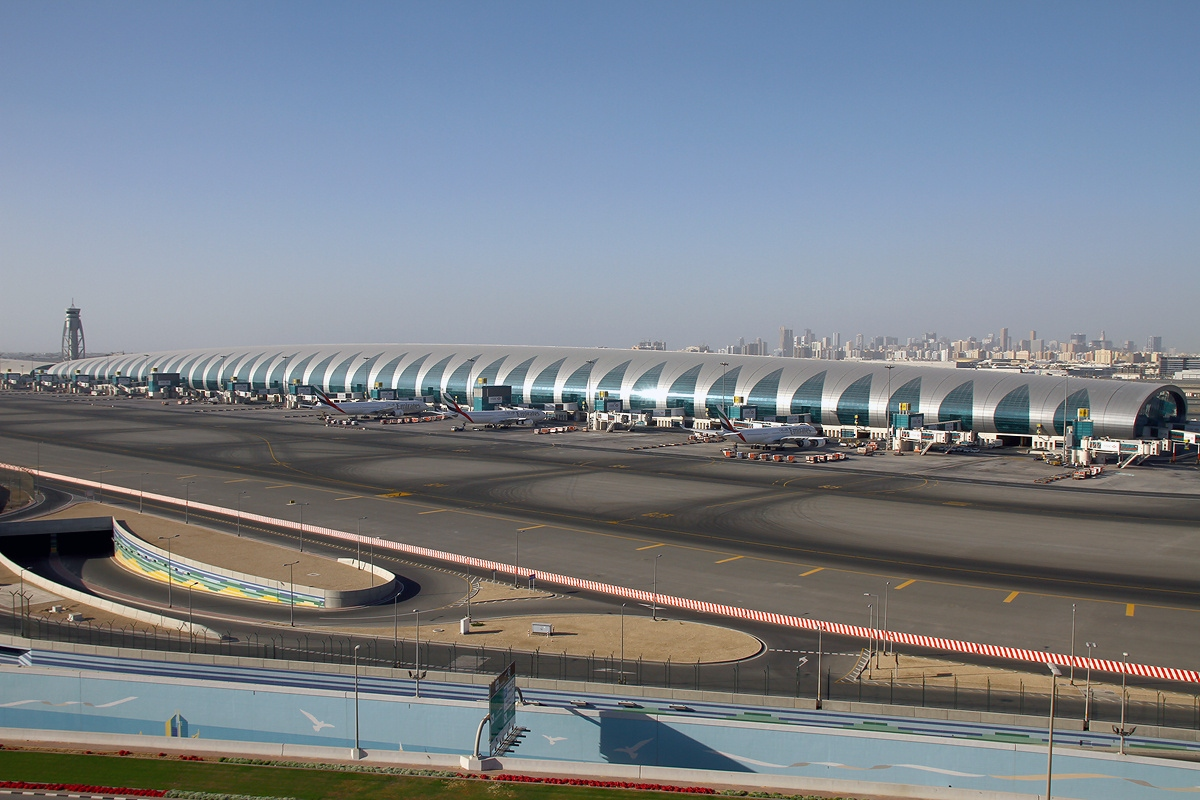
Exterior of Concourse B

Concourse B is directly connected underground to the central building of Terminal 3, and is dedicated exclusively to Emirates. The total built-up area of the concourse itself is 675,000 m^{2} (7,270,000 sq ft). The concourse is 945 m (3,100 ft) long, 90.8 m (298 ft) wide (at midpoint) and 49.5 m (162 ft) high. The terminal has 10 floors (4 basements, a ground floor, and 5 above floors). The building currently includes a multi-level structure for departures and arrivals and includes 32 gates, labeled B1–B32. The concourse has 26 air bridge gates (gates B7-B32) and 5 boarding lounges (B1-B6) for 14 remote stands that are for Airbus A340 and Boeing 777 aircraft only. For transit passengers, the concourse has 3 transfer areas and 62 transfer desks.

The concourse also includes the Emirates first and Business class lounges, and the Marhaba lounge. The First class lounge has a capacity of 1,800 passengers and a total area of 12,600 m^{2} (136,000 sq ft). The Business class lounge has a capacity of 3,000 passengers and a total area of 13,500 m^{2} (145,000 sq ft). The Marhaba Lounge, the smallest lounge at the concourse has a capacity of 300 passengers at a time.

There is a direct connection to Sheikh Rashid Terminal (Concourse C) located at the control tower structure through passenger walkways. There are 120,000 m^{2} (1,300,000 sq ft) of total retail area, including 18 restaurants within the food court, as well as a 300-room hotel and health club with both four and five-star rooms. Concourse B includes five aerobridges that are capable of handling the new Airbus A380. Emirates currently operates 12 gates at the concourse as well as the Emirates First Class and Business Class Lounges.

===== Concourse C =====
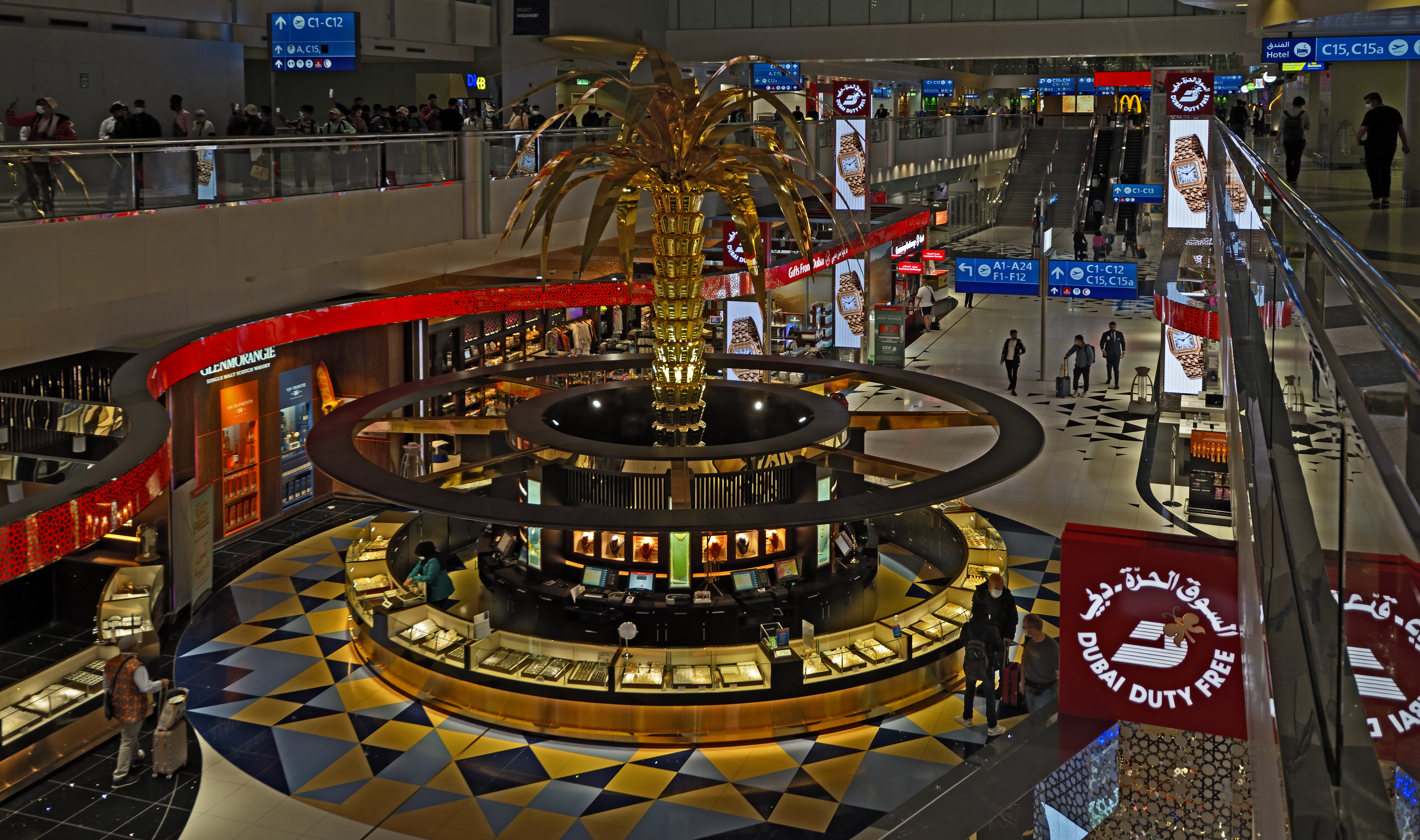
Concourse C duty-free area

Concourse C was opened in 2000 and used to be the largest concourse at Dubai International Airport before Concourse B opened. It contains 50 gates, including 28 air bridges at gates (C1-C23, except for C12a, C15, and C15a) and 22 remote gates located at a lower level of the terminal at gates C29-C50.

The concourse includes over 17 food and beverage cafes and restaurants, with the food court being located on the Departures Level. Also located in the concourse is a 5-star hotel and a 5,400 m^{2} (58,000 sq ft) duty-free shopping facility. Other facilities include prayer rooms and a medical center. Concourse C became part of Terminal 3 in 2016 after Concourse D opened.

==== Al Majlis VIP Pavilion and Dubai Executive Flight Terminal ====
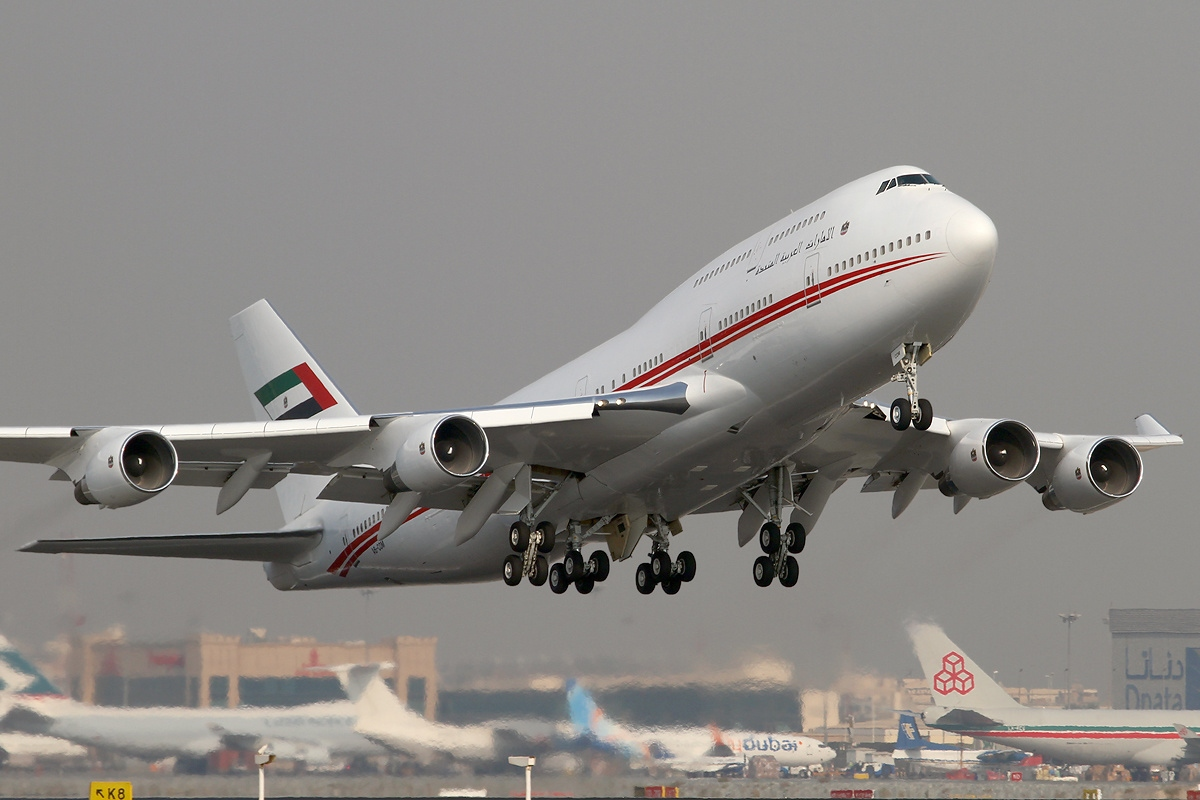
Dubai Royal Air Wing is the main airline operating from the VIP Pavilion

The Al Majlis VIP pavilion was exclusively built for the Dubai Royal Air Wing and opened on 1 July 2008. The entire facility is a 3,400-square-metre (37,000 sq ft) terminal and includes a royal Majlis and an antenna farm. It also includes eight aircraft hangars with a total built up area of 69,598 m^{2} (749,150 sq ft) and maintenance hangars for Boeing 747s and Airbus A380s, and a 1,200-square-metre (13,000 sq ft) gatehouse for VIP service. In 2010 there were 47,213 customers, 13,162 movements and in 2009, there were a total of 43,968 customers and 14,896 movements.

Executive Flight Services (EFS) caters to those passengers of high class or special importance who travel through Dubai International Airport. It is the largest dedicated business aviation terminal of its kind in the Middle East. It is located at the Dubai Airport Free Zone close to Dubai International's Terminal 2. It only caters to private flights exclusive to the terminal. Airlines operating from the terminal are expected to maintain a lounge. In 2010, EFS handled 7,889 aircraft movements and 25,177 passengers.

The center itself is located close to Terminal 2 and includes a 5,500 m^{2} (59,000 sq ft) two-story main building, a 3,700 m^{2} (40,000 sq ft) hangar, a 3,700 m^{2} (40,000 sq ft) ramp area for aircraft parking and a special VIP car park for long term parking. The center also has its own immigration and customs sections, its own Dubai Duty-Free outlet, a fully equipped business and conference center, eight luxury private lounges, and a limousine service between aircraft and the terminal. The ramp area of the terminal can accommodate up to 22 small-sized private jets, between 8 and 12 medium-sized jets, or up to four large-sized jets such as a Boeing Business Jet (BBJ), the Boeing 727 or the Airbus A319. The facility makes EFC the largest dedicated business aviation terminal in the Middle East.

==== Cargo Mega Terminal ====
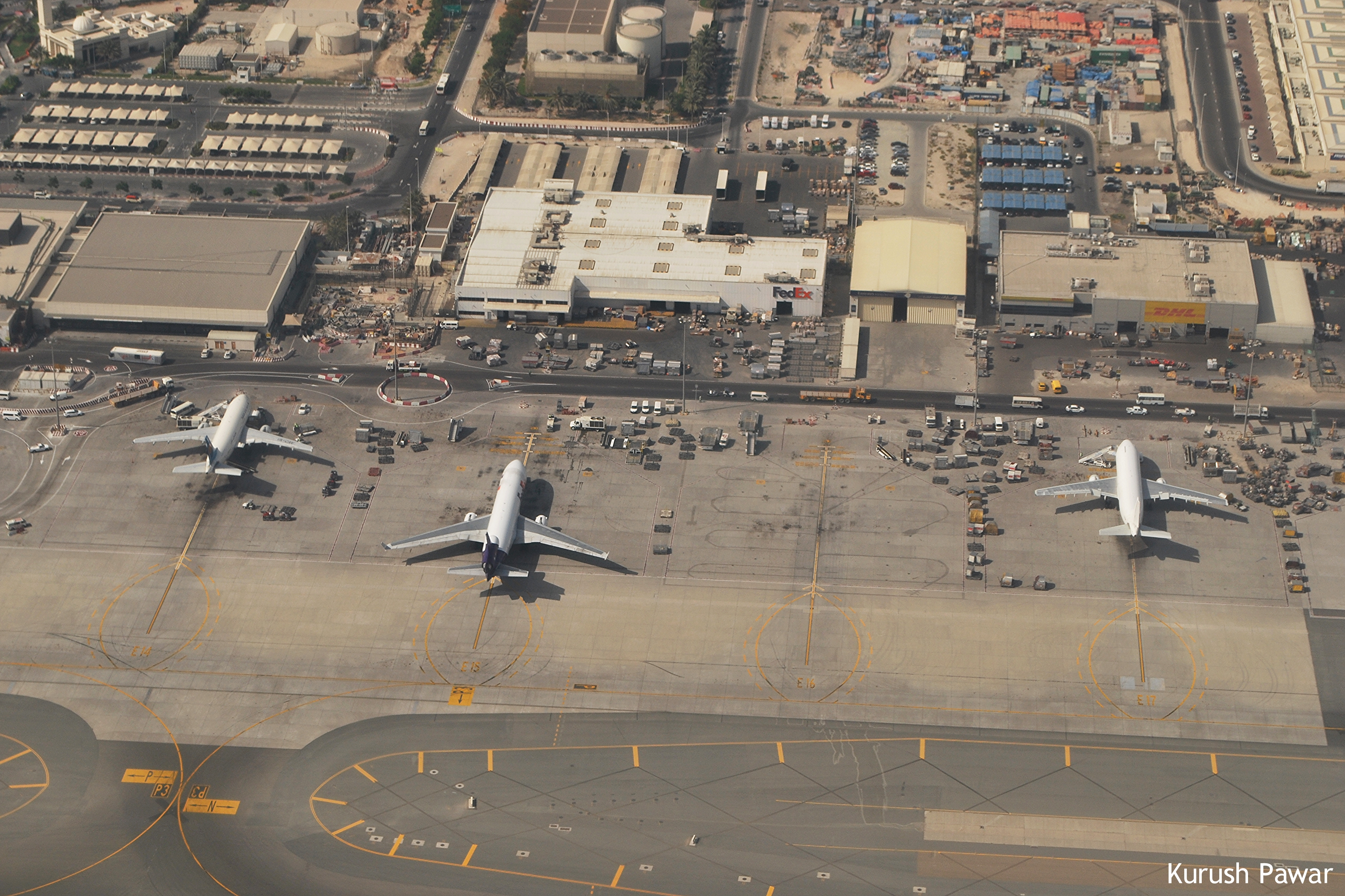
Aircraft stands at the cargo terminal

The cargo village at Dubai International Airport is one of the world's largest and most central cargo hubs, with most of the cargo for Asia and Africa coming through the facility. Forecasts in 2004 for cargo growth predicted that additional major cargo handling facilities were needed to satisfy demands. Plans were put in place to construct the first stage of the cargo mega terminal, which by 2018 was planned to have the ability to handle three million tons of freight. Phase 1 of the cargo mega terminal was completed by 2004 and the next phase of expansion was scheduled for completion in late 2007. Presently the airport has a cargo capacity of 2.5 million tonnes, and will be expanded to handle 3 million.

==== Flower centre ====
Dubai Airport has constructed a flower center to handle flower imports and exports, as Dubai is a major hub for the import and export of flowers, and the airport requires a specialist facility since these products need special conditions. The flower center's first phase was completed in 2004 at a cost of $50 million.

The center when completed and functioning will have a floor area of approximately 100,000 m^{2} (1,100,000 sq ft) including different export chambers and offices. The handling capacity of the center is expected to be more than 300,000 tonnes of product throughput per annum. The entire facility (with the exception of the offices) will be maintained at an ambient temperature of just 2 to 4 °C (36 to 39 °F).

=== Runways ===
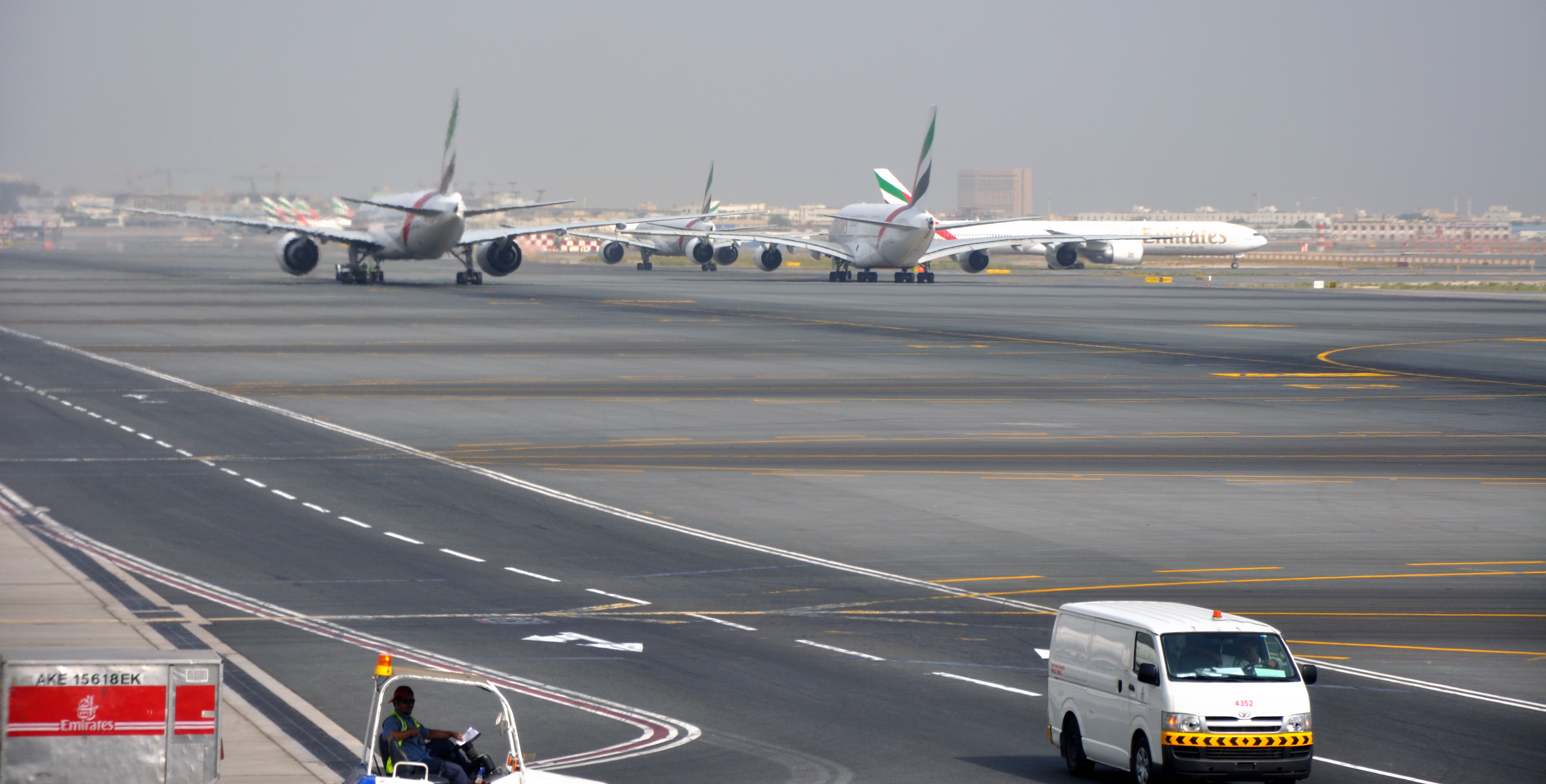
Aircraft taxiing to runway 12L/30R

Dubai Airport has two closely spaced parallel runways, 12R/30L is 4,447 m × 60 m (14,590 ft × 197 ft), 12L/30R is 4,000 m × 60 m (13,120 ft × 200 ft). The gap between the centrelines of the two runways is 385 m (1,263 ft). The runways are equipped with four sets of ILS to guide landing aircraft safely under very poor weather conditions. The runways were expanded to accommodate the Airbus A380 which came into service in 2007. In 2009, it was announced that the airport installed a Category III landing system, allowing planes to land in low-visibility conditions, such as fog. This system was the first of its kind in the United Arab Emirates.

In 2013 Dubai Airports announced an 80-day runway refurbishment program which started on 1 May 2014 and was completed on 21 July 2014. The northern runway was resurfaced while lighting upgrades and additional taxiways were built on the southern runway to help boost its capacity. The southern runway was closed from 1 to 31 May 2014, while the northern runway was closed from 31 May to 20 July 2014. Due to extra congestion on one runway, all freighter, charter and general aviation flights were diverted to Al Maktoum International Airport. Flights at DXB were reduced by 26% and 14 airlines moved to Al Maktoum International Airport whilst the runways works were being done. Emirates cut 5,000 flights and grounded over 20 aircraft during the period.

Dubai Airport closed the southern runway (12R/30L) for complete resurfacing and replacement of the airfield lighting and supporting infrastructure. This was done during a 45-day period from 16 April 2019 to 30 May 2019. The upgrade boosted safety, service and capacity levels at DXB. Airlines were required to reduce flight operations at DXB due to single runway operations.

=== Accommodating the Airbus A380 ===
With Dubai-based Emirates being one of the launch customers for the Airbus A380 and also the largest customer, Dubai Airport needed to expand its existing facilities to accommodate the very large aircraft. The Department of Civil Aviation spent $120 million in upgrading both of its terminals and airport infrastructure, including enlarged gate holdrooms, new finger piers, an enlarged runway, new airbridges and extended baggage belt carousels from the normal 70 to 90 m (230 to 300 ft). Dubai Airport also invested $3.5 billion into a new Concourse A, exclusively for handling Emirates A380s. With the changes made, the airport does not expect embarking and disembarking passengers and baggage from the A380 to take longer than it does for Boeing 747-400s, which carry fewer passengers. On 16 July 2008, Dubai Airport unveiled the first of two specially-built gates capable of handling the aircraft. Costing $10 million, the gates will enable passengers to get on the upper cabin of the new 555-seater aircraft directly from the gate hold rooms. The hold rooms themselves have been enlarged to cater for the larger number of passengers flying the A380s. In addition to the two gates at Terminal 1, five more A380-capable gates were opened at concourse B on 14 October 2008. Concourse A opened on 2 January 2013.

== Labour controversy ==
Workers building a new terminal at Dubai International Airport went on a sympathy strike in March 2006. Another strike took place in October 2007. Four thousand strikers were arrested. Most of them were released some days later and those who were not local were then deported from Dubai.

== Airlines and destinations ==
=== Passenger ===
The following airlines offer regular scheduled and charter services to and from Dubai International Airport:

Airlines	Destinations
Aegean Airlines	Athens
Aeroflot	Krasnodar, Moscow–Sheremetyevo, Saint Petersburg (suspended)
Air Algérie	Algiers
Air Astana	Almaty, Astana, Atyrau (suspended)
Air Canada	Toronto–Pearson (resumes 29 March 2027)
Air China	Beijing–Capital, Chongqing, Hangzhou
Air France	Paris–Charles de Gaulle
Air India	Delhi, Mumbai–Shivaji
Air India Express	Amritsar, Goa–Dabolim, Guwahati, Jaipur, Kannur, Kochi, Kozhikode, Lucknow, Mangaluru, Surat, Thiruvananthapuram, Tiruchirappalli
Air Tanzania	Dar es Salaam, Zanzibar
airBaltic	Riga; Seasonal: Vilnius
Airblue	Islamabad, Karachi, Lahore, Multan
AirSial	Islamabad, Lahore
AJet	Ankara, Istanbul–Sabiha Gökçen
Ariana Afghan Airlines	Kabul
Arkia	Tel Aviv
Austrian Airlines	Seasonal: Vienna
Azerbaijan Airlines	Baku
Batik Air Malaysia	Kuala Lumpur–International
Belavia	Minsk
Berniq Airways	Benghazi
Biman Bangladesh Airlines	Chattogram, Dhaka, Sylhet
British Airways	London–Heathrow
Cathay Pacific	Hong Kong (resumes 1 February 2027)
Cebu Pacific	Manila
Centrum Air	Samarqand, Tashkent
China Eastern Airlines	Kunming, Qingdao, Shanghai–Pudong, Xi'an
China Southern Airlines	Guangzhou, Shenyang, Shenzhen, Urumqi, Wuhan
Condor	Berlin, Stuttgart
Cyprus Airways	Larnaca
Daallo Airlines	Bosaso, Garowe, Hargeisa, Mogadishu
Drukair	Paro
Egyptair	Cairo
El Al	Tel Aviv
Emirates	Abidjan, Addis Ababa, Accra, Adelaide, Ahmedabad, Algiers (ends 3 February 2027), Amman–Queen Alia, Amsterdam, Antananarivo, Athens, Auckland, Baghdad, Bahrain, Bangkok–Suvarnabhumi, Barcelona, Basra, Beijing–Capital, Beirut, Bengaluru, Birmingham, Bogotá, Bologna, Boston, Brisbane, Brussels, Budapest, Buenos Aires–Ezeiza, Cairo, Cape Town, Casablanca, Cebu, Chennai, Chicago–O'Hare, Christchurch, Clark, Colombo–Bandaranaike, Conakry, Copenhagen, Dakar–Diass, Dallas/Fort Worth, Dammam, Da Nang, Dar es Salaam, Delhi, Denpasar, Dhaka, Dublin, Durban, Düsseldorf, Edinburgh, Entebbe, Erbil, Frankfurt, Geneva, Glasgow, Guangzhou, Hamburg, Hangzhou, Hanoi, Harare, Helsinki, Ho Chi Minh City, Hong Kong, Houston–Intercontinental, Hyderabad, Islamabad, Istanbul, Jakarta–Soekarno-Hatta, Jeddah, Johannesburg–O. R. Tambo, Karachi, Kochi, Kolkata, Kuala Lumpur–International, Kuwait City, Lagos, Lahore, Larnaca, Lisbon, London–Gatwick, London–Heathrow, London–Stansted, Los Angeles, Luanda–Agostinho Neto, Lusaka, Lyon, Madrid, Mahé, Malé, Malta, Manchester, Manila, Mauritius, Medina, Melbourne, Mexico City–Benito Juárez, Miami, Milan–Malpensa, Montréal–Trudeau, Moscow–Domodedovo, Mumbai–Shivaji, Munich, Muscat, Nairobi–Jomo Kenyatta, New York–JFK, Newark, Newcastle upon Tyne, Nice, Orlando, Osaka–Kansai, Oslo, Paris–Charles de Gaulle, Perth, Peshawar, Phnom Penh, Phuket, Prague, Riyadh, Rio de Janeiro–Galeão, Rome–Fiumicino, Saint Petersburg, San Francisco, São Paulo–Guarulhos, Seattle/Tacoma, Seoul–Incheon, Shanghai–Pudong, Shenzhen, Sialkot, Siem Reap, Singapore, Stockholm–Arlanda, Sydney, Taipei–Taoyuan, Tehran–Imam Khomeini (suspended), Tel Aviv (suspended), Thiruvananthapuram, Tokyo–Haneda, Tokyo–Narita, Toronto–Pearson, Tunis, Venice, Vienna, Warsaw–Chopin, Washington–Dulles, Zürich
Ethiopian Airlines	Addis Ababa
Eurowings	Seasonal: Berlin (resumes 25 November 2026), Stuttgart
Finnair	Seasonal: Helsinki (resumes 28 October 2027)
FitsAir	Colombo–Bandaranaike
Fly Baghdad	Baghdad
Fly Cham	Damascus
Fly Jinnah	Lahore
Fly Oya	Tripoli–Mitiga
Flyadeal	Riyadh
FlyArystan	Aqtau, Aqtöbe, Astana, Oral (begins 24 December 2026), Şymkent
Flydubai	Abha, Addis Ababa, Ahmedabad, Al Ula, Alexandria, Almaty, Amman–Queen Alia, Ankara, Aqtau (begins 19 December 2026), Aşgabat, Asmara, Astana, Atyrau (begins 18 December 2026), Baghdad, Bahrain, Baku, Bandar Abbas (suspended), Basel/Mulhouse, Bangkok–Don Mueang, Basra, Beirut, Belgrade, Benghazi, Bishkek, Bucharest–Otopeni, Budapest, Bushehr (suspended), Cairo, Catania, Chattogram, Chișinău Colombo–Bandaranaike, Damascus, Dammam, Dar es Salaam, Delhi, Dhaka, Djibouti, Doha, Dushanbe, Entebbe, Erbil, Faisalabad, Gassim, Giza, Grozny, Ha'il, Hargeisa, Hofuf, Hyderabad, Iași, Isfahan (suspended), Islamabad, Istanbul, Istanbul–Sabiha Gökçen, Jeddah, Jizan, Juba, Kabul, Karachi, Kathmandu, Kerman (suspended), Kilimanjaro, Kish (suspended), Kochi, Kolkata, Kozhikode, Krabi, Kraków, Krasnodar, Kuwait City, Lahore, Langkawi, Lar (suspended), Ljubljana, Lucknow, Malé, Mashhad (suspended), Medina, Milan–Bergamo, Mineralnye Vody, Minsk, Mombasa, Multan, Mumbai–Shivaji, Muscat, Nairobi–Jomo Kenyatta, Najaf, Najran, Namangan, Naples, Neom Bay, Novosibirsk, Pattaya, Penang, Perm, Peshawar, Pisa, Pokhara–International, Poznań, Prague, Qaisumah, Qeshm (suspended), Quetta, Red Sea, Riga, Riyadh, Saint Petersburg, Salalah, Salzburg, Samara, Samarqand (resumes 29 December 2026), Sarajevo, Shiraz (suspended), Sialkot, Siddharthanagar, Skopje (resumes 1 April 2027), Sofia, Sohar, Sochi, Sulaimaniyah, Şymkent (resumes 25 December 2026), Tabriz (suspended), Tabuk, Taif, Tashkent, Tbilisi, Tehran–Imam Khomeini (suspended), Tel Aviv, Tirana, Tyumen (begins 19 December 2026), Ufa, Vilnius, Volgograd, Warsaw–Chopin, Yangon, Yekaterinburg, Yerevan, Zagreb, Zanzibar; Seasonal: Antalya, Batumi, Bodrum, Cagliari, Corfu, Dubrovnik, El Alamein, Kazan, Kutaisi, Makhachkala, Mykonos, Olbia, Santorini, Tivat, Trabzon
Flynas	Dammam, Jeddah, Medina, Riyadh
FlyOne	Chișinău; Seasonal: Yerevan
Gulf Air	Bahrain
Hainan Airlines	Haikou
IndiGo	Ahmedabad, Bengaluru, Bhubaneswar, Chandigarh, Chennai, Delhi, Hyderabad, Kochi, Kozhikode, Mangaluru, Mumbai–Shivaji, Pune, Surat
Iraqi Airways	Baghdad, Basra, Erbil, Najaf
ITA Airways	Rome–Fiumicino
Israir Airlines	Tel Aviv
Jazeera Airways	Kuwait City
Jordan Aviation	Amman–Queen Alia
Jubba Airways	Bosaso, Hargeisa, Mogadishu
Kam Air	Kabul, Khost
Kenya Airways	Nairobi–Jomo Kenyatta
KLM	Amsterdam (resumes 27 March 2027)
Kuwait Airways	Kuwait City
LOT Polish Airlines	Seasonal: Warsaw–Chopin
Lufthansa	Frankfurt, Munich
Luxair	Seasonal: Luxembourg (resumes 1 February 2027)
Middle East Airlines	Beirut
Myanmar Airways International	Yangon
Nepal Airlines	Kathmandu
Oman Air	Muscat
Pakistan International Airlines	Faisalabad, Islamabad, Karachi, Lahore, Multan, Peshawar, Sialkot, Skardu
Pegasus Airlines	Ankara, Istanbul–Sabiha Gökçen (all flights suspended)
Philippine Airlines	Manila
Qatar Airways	Doha
Riyadh Air	Riyadh
Royal Air Maroc	Casablanca
Royal Brunei Airlines	Bandar Seri Begawan, London–Heathrow
Royal Jordanian	Amman–Queen Alia
RwandAir	Kigali
S7 Airlines	Seasonal: Novosibirsk (suspended)
SalamAir	Muscat
Saudia	Jeddah, Neom Bay, Riyadh
SereneAir	Islamabad, Lahore
Sichuan Airlines	Chengdu–Tianfu (resumes 1 January 2027)
Singapore Airlines	Singapore (resumes 2 December 2026)
Smartwings	Seasonal: Prague; Seasonal charter: Vienna
Somon Air	Dushanbe, Khujand
SpiceJet	Ahmedabad, Amritsar, Delhi, Jaipur, Kochi, Kozhikode, Madurai, Mumbai–Shivaji, Pune
SriLankan Airlines	Colombo–Bandaranaike
SunExpress	Antalya; Seasonal: İzmir
Swiss International Air Lines	Zürich
Syrian Air	Damascus
Transavia	Seasonal: Amsterdam
Turkish Airlines	Istanbul
Turkmenistan Airlines	Ashgabat
Uganda Airlines	Entebbe
United Airlines	Newark
US-Bangla Airlines	Dhaka
Uzbekistan Airways	Fergana, Tashkent
Virgin Atlantic	London-Heathrow (resumes 28 March 2027)
Wizz Air	Bucharest–Otopeni (resumes 28 March 2027), Budapest (resumes 28 March 2027)

Notes:

- ^{1} Biman Bangladesh Airlines' flight from Dubai to Dhaka makes a stop at Sylhet.

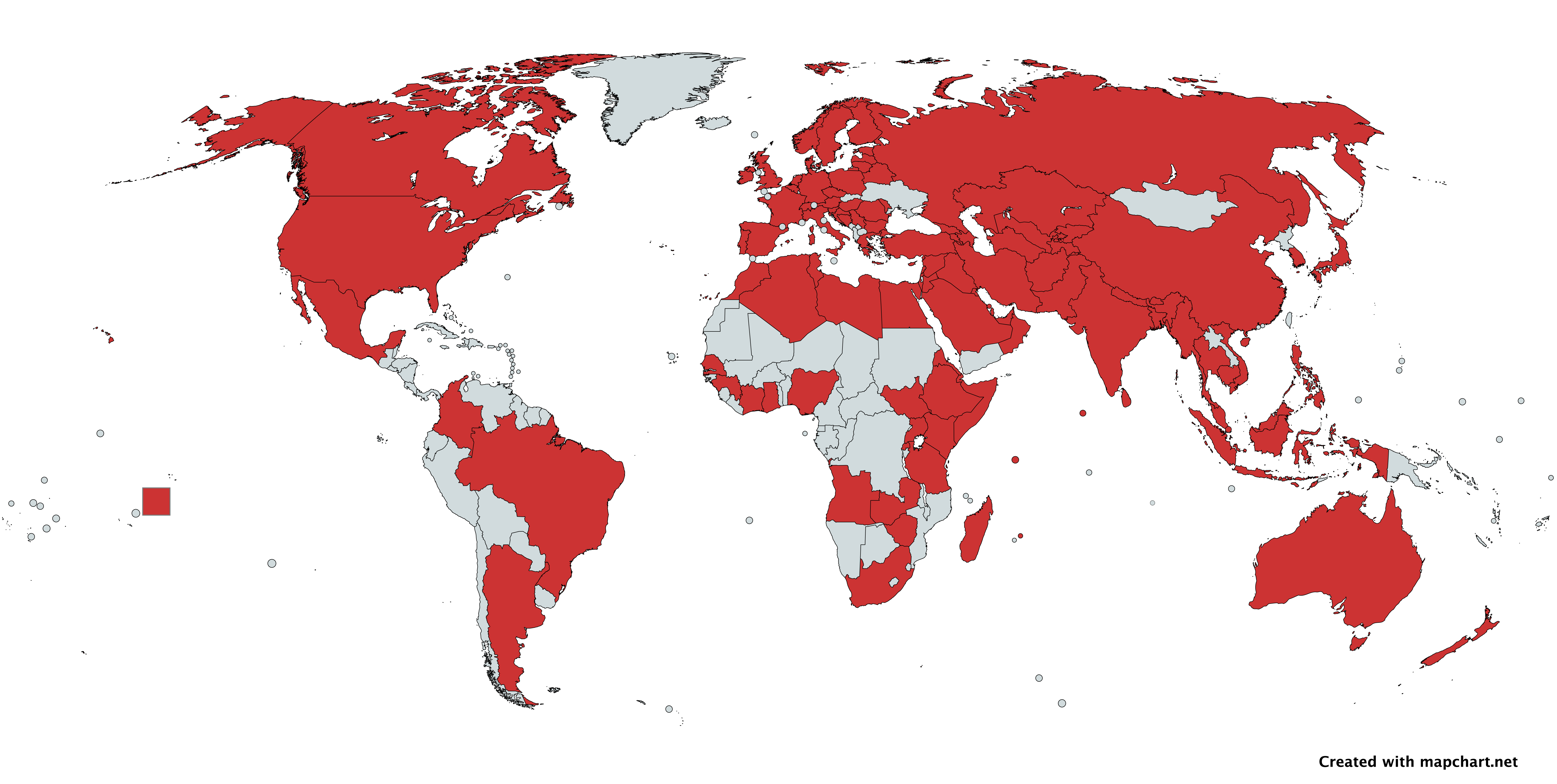
Dubai International Airport passenger destinations

== Services ==
=== Aviation services ===
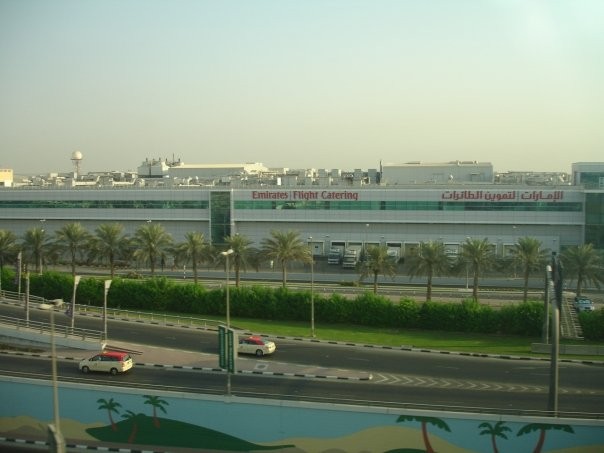
The Emirates Flight Catering centre, which was expanded in 2007, is capable of producing 115,000 meals per day

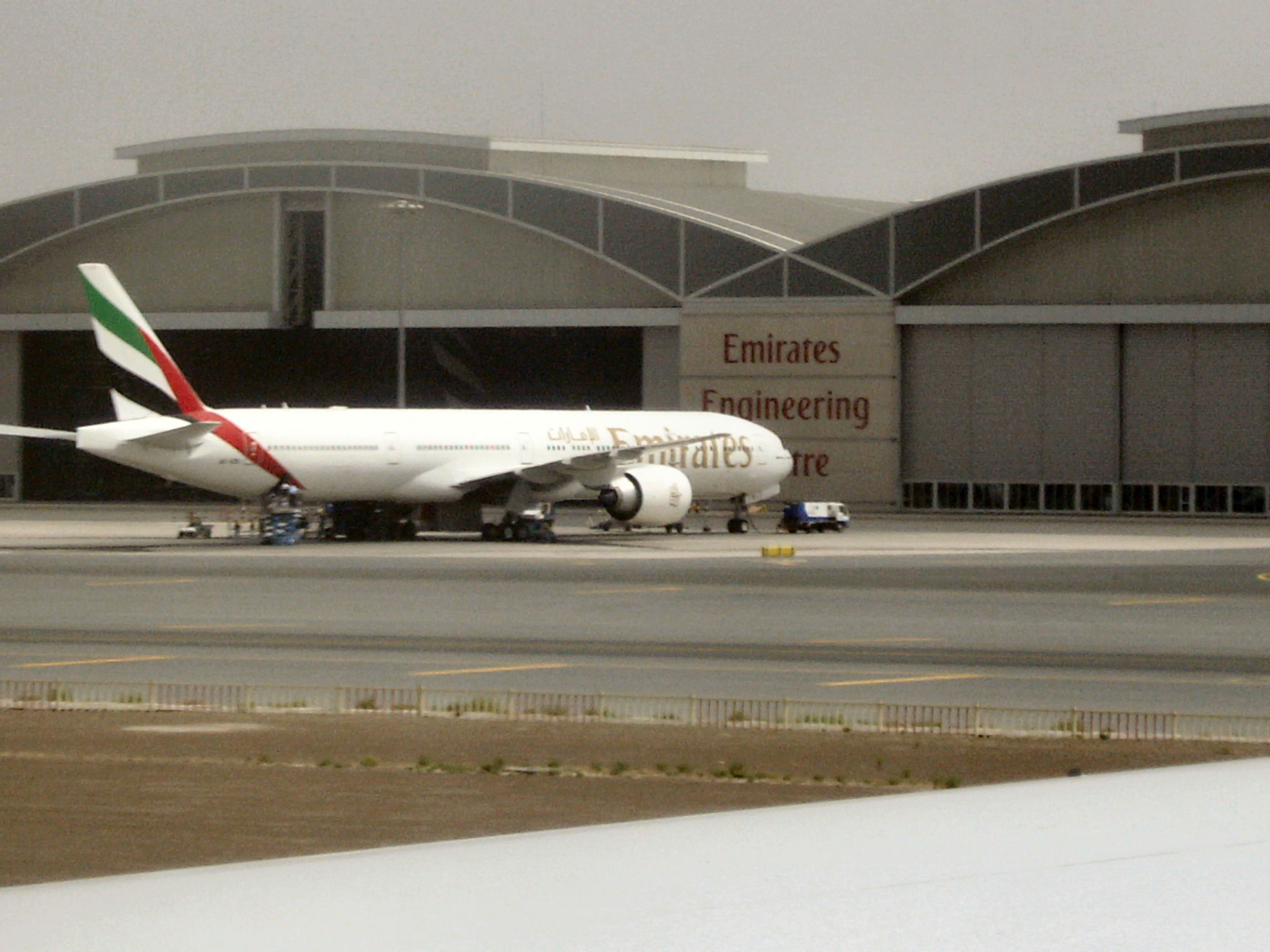
Emirates Engineering Centre aircraft hangars at DXB

==== Ground handling ====
Ground handling services at Dubai International Airport has been provided by Dnata Ground Handling Services.

The Emirates airline has over 2000 Airport Services employees current serving the airport.

Services include cargo ramp and technical support services to airlines at Dubai Airport.

==== Aircraft maintenance ====
Emirates Engineering, based in Dubai, operates the aircraft maintenance and engine test cell technical facilities at the airport. Emirates Engineering currently provides full support for the Emirates Airline fleet and all the other international operations at the airport.

Current facilities include:

- Seven aircraft hangars all capable of handling the A380 (currently the largest aircraft hangar in the world)
- Aircraft painting hangar
- Aircraft processing plant
- Aircraft engine run-up facility enclosure
- Engineering Line Maintenance facility
- Engine Test Cell
- Aircraft spare parts stores

=== Passenger services ===
The airport has over 26,000 m^{2} (280,000 sq ft) of retail space spread between its three main terminals and includes many shopping and eating outlets. The Dubai duty-free shopping area in Terminal 2 covers 1,400 m^{2} (15,000 sq ft) in departures and 50 m^{2} (540 sq ft) in arrivals. The 3,437-square-metre (37,000 sq ft) extension included a larger arrivals hall as well.

Extensive upgrading work on existing retail areas since 2004 in Terminals 1 and 2 has increased sales. Dubai Duty Free Company announced annual sales of Dhs5.9 billion (US$1.6 billion) in 2012, representing a 10 per cent increase on the previous year. In 2008, Dubai Duty Free doubled its retail space from 7,000 to 15,000 m^{2} (75,000 to 161,000 sq ft) with the inauguration of the new Emirates Terminal 3 in October 2008. Dubai Duty Free recorded more than 23.5 million transactions in 2012. As of August 2009, Dubai Duty Free was the biggest single airport retail operation in the world ahead of London's Heathrow and Seoul's Incheon airports.

In addition to a wide array of duty-free shops and eating outlets, Dubai Airport has two open-air garden areas. Dubai Airport has numerous business centres located around the airport. Within the international transit area of the interconnected Terminals 1 and 2, internet and games facilities, prayer rooms, showers, spas, gym, swimming pool and three hotels are provided. Various lounge areas are provided, some including children's play areas or televisions showing news, movies and sports channels. Terminal 3 has a left luggage facility operated by Emirates in the Arrivals area where layover passengers can leave their luggage for a fee while they go sightseeing.

== Safety and security ==
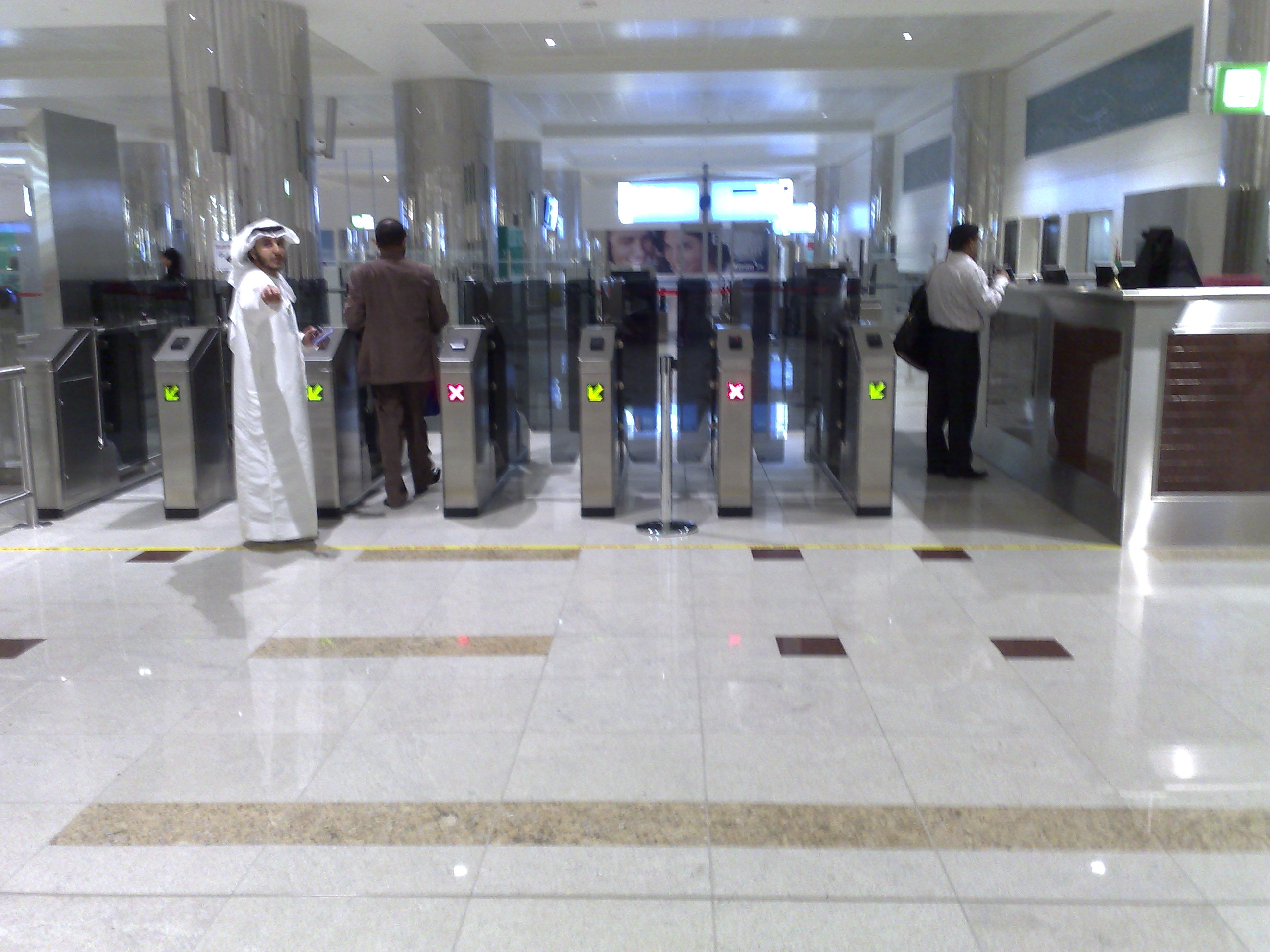
Smart Gate immigration counters at Passport Control

The Civil Aviation Authority of Dubai manages the overall safety and security of the airport. Pre-screening takes place in all terminals at the entrance of the airport. Iris scanning has been implemented in all UAE airports. This type of scanning prevents those deported from the UAE for serious criminal charges from returning again using fraudulent documents.

The airport uses highly sensitive equipment to conduct thorough searches on travellers into the UAE, including screening for smuggling, possessing or taking illegal drugs in the country. A senior Dubai judge was quoted on 11 February 2008, by Seven Days saying, "These laws help discourage anyone from carrying or using drugs. Even if the amount of illegal drugs found on someone is 0.05 grams, they will be found guilty. The penalty is a minimum four years if it is for personal use. The message is clear—drugs will not be tolerated". A number of travellers have been held pending charge while Dubai authorities test their possessions, blood and urine for any trace of contraband.

In 2018, the Houthi rebel group claimed that Dubai airport had been attacked by drones launched by Houthi rebels from Yemen. In response, Dubai Airports stated "With regards to reports by questionable sources this morning, Dubai Airports can confirm that Dubai International (DXB) is operating as normal without any interruption".

== Operations ==
Since there are international flights operating out from the airport, the terminals are equipped with immigration processing facilities and security scanning for all passengers including domestic, and regional passengers. Terminals 1 and 3 handle 95% of the international flights, whilst Terminal 2 mainly caters to regional flights and international flights routed to other airports in Middle East. Emirates Airline operates from only Terminal 3. Conversely, low-cost carriers such as flydubai operate flights out of Terminal 2.

Passenger growth at the airport has been growing at an average rate of 18%. The airport reached its capacity of 33 million passengers per annum by 2007; however, this was still not enough to handle the growing over congestion at the airport. In 2013, the airport's capacity reached 75 million with the opening of concourse A and expansion of Terminal 2.

Passenger traffic for 2014 grew by 7.5% as 70.48 million passengers passed through Dubai International, compared to 66.43 million during the corresponding period in 2013. Growth slowed down in 2014 due to the 80-day runway resurfacing project, which saw DXB operate with only one runway between May and July.

In 2014, India was DXB's biggest destination with 8.91 million passengers. The UK, Saudi Arabia and Pakistan followed with 5.38 million, 4.88 million and 3.13 million, respectively. London Heathrow became the top city destination, recording 2,626,357 passengers. Doha followed it with 2,355,959.

In 2020, Dubai International Airport's first quarter passenger traffic fell down by 67.8 per cent and reached 5.75 million. This is even lower than the statistics presented last year in the same quarter.

In 2022, Dubai International Airport registered strong recovery and robust growth in its customer base that propelled the annual passenger numbers to 66 million. The airport's growth outpaced the annual forecast in the final months of the year following an exceptionally strong fourth quarter.

=== Cargo ===
The airport handled 2.37 million tonnes of air cargo in 2014, a decrease of 3.1 per cent over 2013, making it the sixth-busiest airfreight hub in the world and the busiest in the Middle East. The decline was due to the runway closure, and the shifting of many cargo flights from DXB to Al Maktoum International Airport.

== Ground transportation ==
=== Road ===
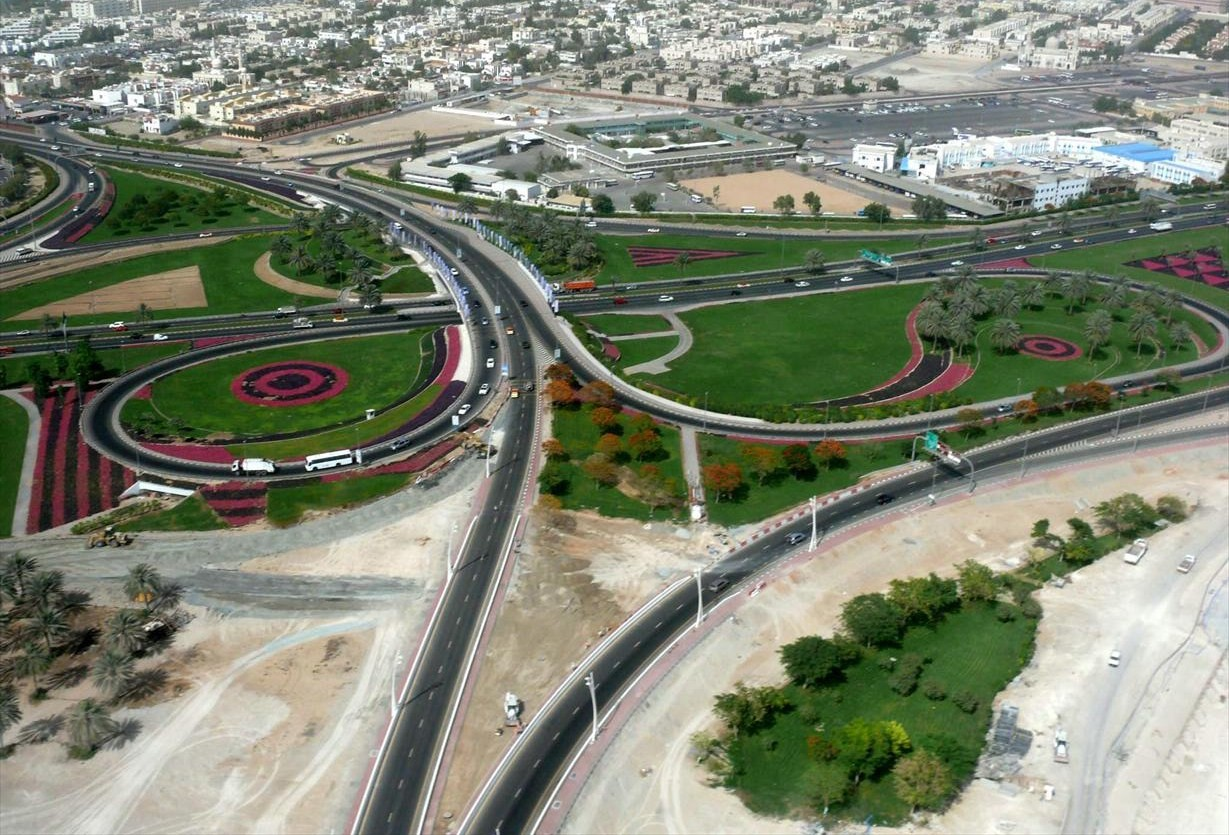
The D 89 leading to Dubai Airport

The airport is connected by the road D 89. One of the longest intra-city roads, D 89 begins at the Deira Corniche and runs perpendicular to D 85 (Baniyas Road). From Deira, the road progresses south-eastward towards Dubai International Airport, intersecting with E311 (Sheikh Mohammed Bin Zayed Road) past the airport. A road tunnel underneath one of the runways was built in 2003, known as the Airport Tunnel.

=== Metro ===
The airport is served by Dubai Metro, which operates two lines through or near the airport. The Red Line has a station at each of Terminal 3 and Terminal 1. The stations are located in front of both terminals and can be accessed directly from the arrivals areas.

The Green Line has at a station near the Airport Free Zone, from which passengers can connect to Terminal 2.

=== Bus ===
Dubai Buses operated by RTA run a number of routes to the city, but mainly Deira, and are available at the Airport Ground Transportation center and the Arrivals at every terminal.

Passengers who need to transfer between Terminals 1 and 3, and Terminal 2 can use the inter-terminal shuttle bus service which operates frequently.

Bus stations are situated opposite both Terminal 1, 2 and 3. Local buses CO1, 11, 15, 24, N30, 32C, 33, 64A and 77 can be used to connect with Terminal 1 and 3, while Bus 13B, 20, C26, N30, 31, and 43 connects with Terminal 2. Dubai International Airport Buses provide air-conditioned transport into the city center and over 80 hotels in the city.

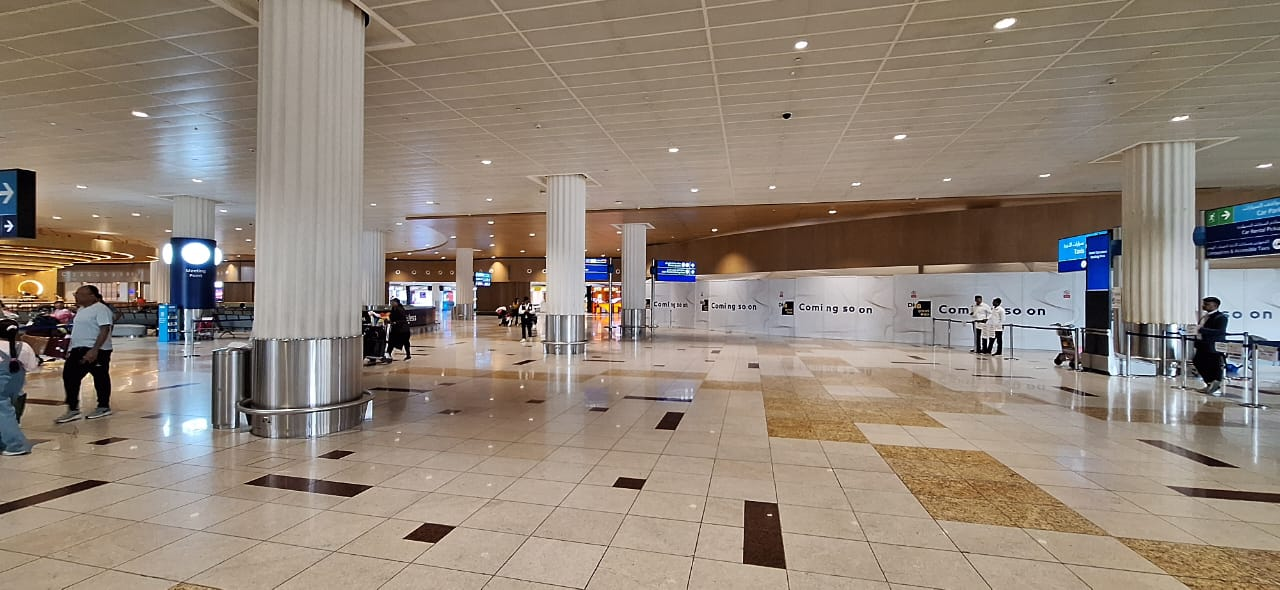
The exit in DXB

Emirates has a complimentary coach service, which operates three daily services to and from Al Ain, and four daily, to and from Abu Dhabi. So does Etihad.

=== Taxi ===
The airport is served by the Government owned Dubai Taxi Agency, which provides 24-hour service at the arrivals in every terminal. The Airport Taxi fares are higher than the usual 5 AED fare for normal taxis, possibly as high as 25 dirhams.

== Accidents and incidents ==
- On 14 March 1972, Sterling Airways Flight 296 crashed on approach to Dubai; 112 died.
- On 20 July 1973, Japan Air Lines Flight 404 was a passenger flight which was hijacked by Palestinian and Japanese terrorists. The flight was hijacked shortly after takeoff from Schiphol and made a stop in Dubai before flying to Damascus.
- On 27 December 1997, a Pakistan Airlines Boeing 747, registered AP-BAT, operating a flight from Dubai to London, crashed at Dubai airport after an aborted takeoff. The plane overshot the runway by 300m and went through the perimeter wall before coming to rest. No one died.
- On 22 November 1974, British Airways Flight 870, a Vickers VC10, from Dubai to Heathrow, was hijacked in Dubai, landing at Tripoli for refuelling before flying on to Tunis. One hostage was murdered before the hijackers eventually surrendered after 84 hours. Captain Jim Futcher was awarded the Queen's Gallantry Medal, the Guild of Air Pilots and Air Navigators Founders Medal, the British Air Line Pilots Association Gold Medal and a Certificate of Commendation from British Airways for his actions during the hijacking, having returned to the aircraft to fly it knowing the hijackers were on board.
- In 1999, Indian Airlines Flight 814 was hijacked over Indian airspace and tried to land at Dubai, after being prevented from landing in neighboring Oman. With the airport authorities ensuring that the plane could not land by stationing airport equipment and coaches on the runways, the hijacked flight landed at Al Minhad Air Base.
- On 21 September 2001, an Aeroflot IL-86 operating as Flight 521 landed gear up after the flight crew forgot to turn on the landing gear circuit breaker. All 322 people on board survived, but the aircraft was written off.
- On 17 October 2001, Pakistan International Airlines flight PK231, an Airbus A300, from Islamabad via Peshawar veered off the side of the runway after the right hand maingear collapsed as it touched down. The aircraft skidded and eventually came to rest in sand 50 meters from the runway. The aircraft sustained damage to its right wing structure and its no. 2 engine, which partly broke off the wing resulting in hull loss. All 205 crew and passengers (which included high-profile American political commentator and talk show host Tucker Carlson and his father Dick Carlson) evacuated safely.
- On 12 March 2007, the nose gear of Biman Bangladesh Airlines Flight BG006, an Airbus A310-300, collapsed while the aircraft was accelerating down the runway.
- On 3 September 2010, UPS Flight 6, operating a Boeing 747-44AF N571UP crashed due to an in-flight fire when attempting to return to Dubai. N571UP was operating an international cargo flight to Cologne Bonn Airport, Germany.
- On 3 August 2016, Emirates Flight 521 from Thiruvananthapuram International Airport, operating a Boeing 777-300 A6-EMW crashed upon landing. All 300 passengers and crew evacuated safely. One airport firefighter died battling the flames.
- On 19 December 2021, an Emirates Boeing 777-300ER A6-EQI performing Emirates Flight 231 from Dubai to Dulles International Airport took off and nearly crashed into nearby office or apartment buildings. It was discovered that there were problems with the autopilot.
- On 1 July 2022, a Brisbane bound Emirates Airbus A380 suffered some damage during takeoff. After it landed, airport workers found a big hole in the fuselage and some bolts in the landing gear. Investigations are still underway.

== In media ==
In 2013, Dubai International Airport was featured in a 10-part documentary series called Ultimate Airport Dubai that aired on the National Geographic Channel and was produced by Arrow Media and National Geographic Channels International. The documentary focused on the everyday operations of the airport. The series returned for a second season in 2014 and a third in 2015. The series currently streams on popular streaming platform Disney+.

== See also ==
- Al Maktoum International Airport – Dubai's second airport, located in Jebel Ali
- Developments in Dubai
- Tourism in Dubai
- Transportation in Dubai
- List of the busiest airports in the Middle East
