= Dubai Flower Centre =

Coordinates: 25.26274°N 55.33828°E

Dubai Flower Centre was developed to handle flower imports and exports, as Dubai is a major hub for the import and export of flowers and the airport required a specialist facility since these products need special conditions. The flower centre's first phase was completed in 2004 at a cost of $50 million.

The Flower centre is capable of handling up to 180,000 tons of flowers and perishables. The centre, developed and automated have a floor area of about 100,000 square metres providing for export chambers and offices apart from product break down and buildup stations and automated sorting areas. The handling capacity of the centre is anticipated to exceed 300,000 metric tonnes of product throughput per annum. The cold storage facility at Dubai Flower Centre is fully bonded and measures 34,000 square metres. DFC currently houses around 19 tenants from 11 countries that offer a diverse range of products and varieties of cut flowers, plants, foliage, fruits and vegetables. Once fully operational it will serve as an international market with over two billion consumers.

== See also ==
- List of development projects in Dubai
