= D 89 road (United Arab Emirates) =

Road in Dubai, United Arab Emirates

D 89
- د ٨٩
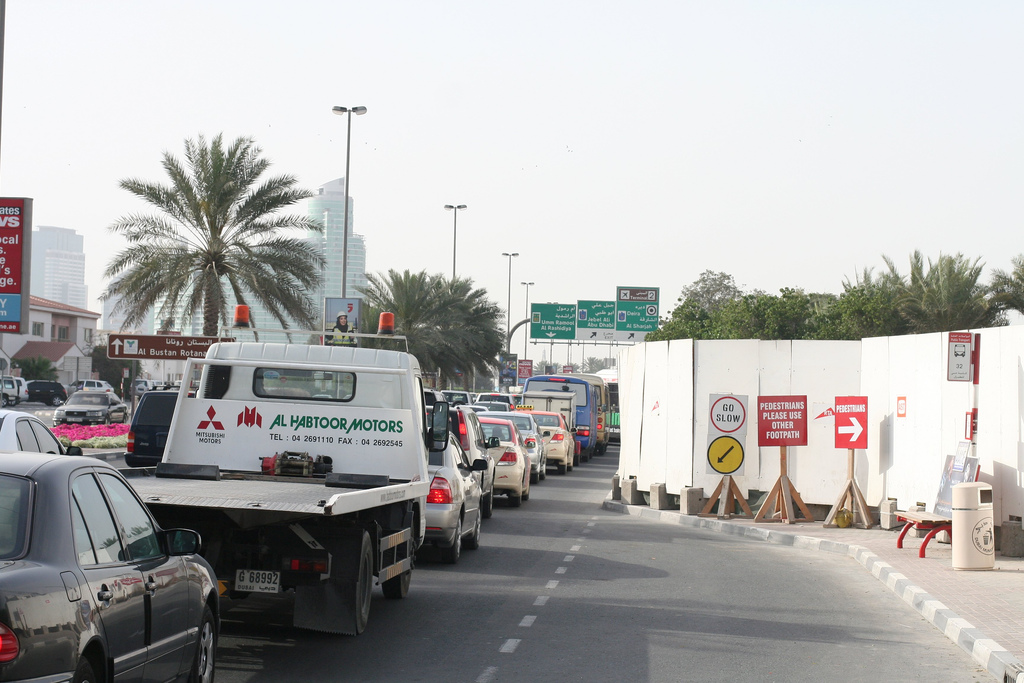
- Airport Road near Al Garhoud

Route information
- Length: 22.4 km (13.9 mi)

Major junctions
- E 311 (Emirates Road); E 11; D 85 (Baniyas Road)

Location
- Country: United Arab Emirates
- Major cities: Dubai

Highway system
- Transport in the United Arab Emirates; Roads in Dubai

D 89, also known as Al Maktoum Road, Airport Road or Al Khawaneej Road, is a road in Dubai, United Arab Emirates. One of the longest intra-city roads, D 89 begins at the Deira Corniche and runs perpendicular to D 85 (Baniyas Road). From Deira, the road progresses south-eastward towards Dubai International Airport, intersecting with E 311 (Emirates Road) past the airport. It proceeds further south-east towards the localities of Al Khawaneej and Mirdif.

Important landmarks along D 89 include the Deira Corniche, Deira Twin Towers, Dubai International Airport, Al Bustan Rotana Hotel, Le Meridian Hotel, Al Rashidiya Park and Mushrif Park.
