= E 11 road (United Arab Emirates) =

Road in the United Arab Emirates

Coordinates: 25°13′7″N 55°16′48″E

E 11
- إ ١١
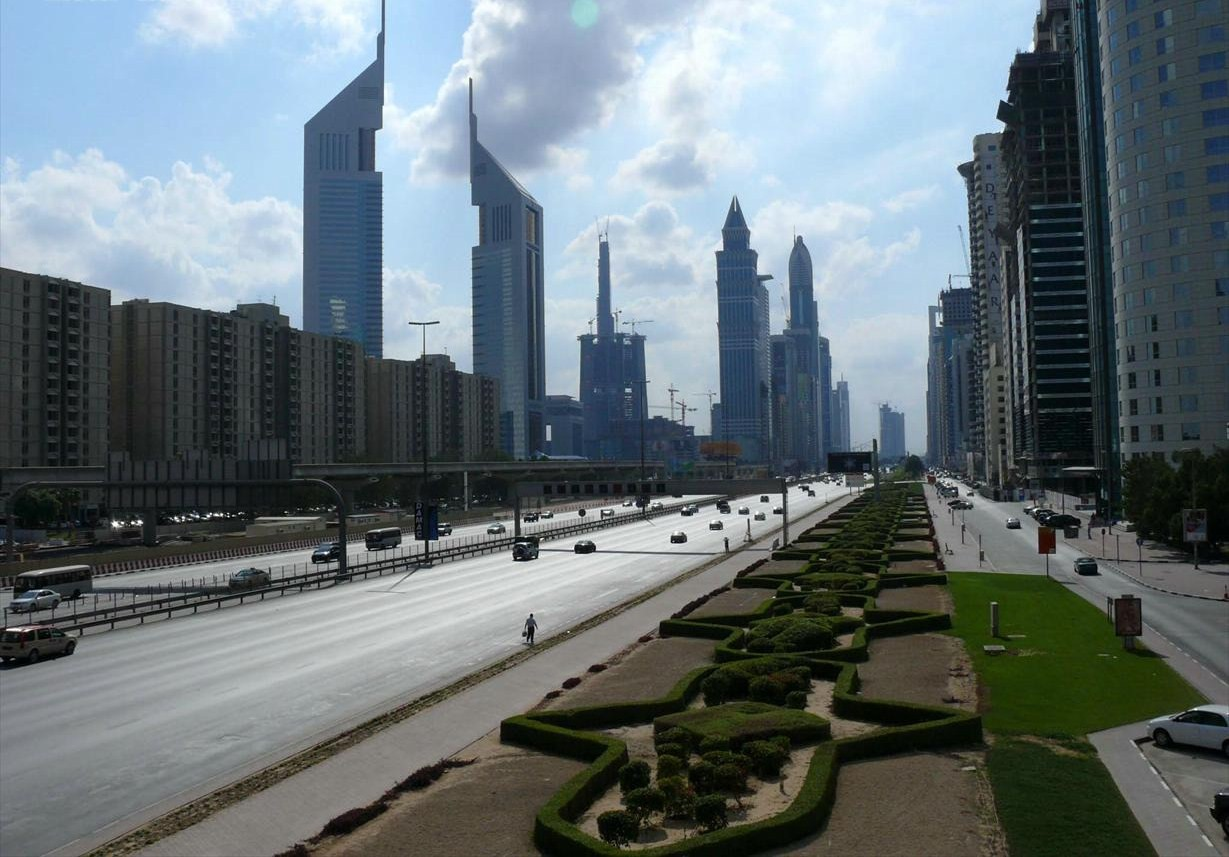
- E 11 becomes Sheikh Zayed Road in Dubai, with Dubai Metro visible

Route information
- Part of
- Length: 558.4 km (347.0 mi)
- Existed: 1980–present

Major junctions
- West end: Ghuwaifat Border Crossing
- E 15 – Ghiyathi Road; E 45 – Tarif - Liwa Oasis Road; E 65 – Liwa - Abu Dhabi Road; E 22 – Al Ain Road; E 20 – Suweihan Road; E 10 – Zayed bin Sultan Street; E 14 – Al Faqa Road; E 75 – Al Fayah Road; D 53 – Al Maktoum Airport Street; E 77 – Expo Road; D 57 – Al Yalayis Street; D 63 – Hessa Street; D 71 – Financial Center Road; E 66 – Oud Metha Road; S 108 – Al Khan Street; S 112 – King Faisal Street; E 55 – Al Shuwaib - Umm Al Quwien Road; E 311 – Mohammed Bin Zayed Road; E 18 – Al Manama - Ras Al Khaimah Road
- East end: Al Dara Border Crossing

Location
- Country: United Arab Emirates
- Major cities: Dubai, Sharjah, Ajman, Umm al-Quwain, Ras al Khaimah, Abu Dhabi

Highway system
- Transport in the United Arab Emirates; Roads in Dubai

E 11 (Arabic: شارع ﺇ ١١) is a highway in the United Arab Emirates (UAE). The longest road in the Emirates, it stretches from the Al Ghuwaifat border crossing at the Saudi Arabia–UAE border in al-Silah in the al-Dhafra region of the Emirate of Abu Dhabi and ends at the Oman–UAE border crossing of al-Darah in al-Jeer, Emirate of Ras al-Khaimah, running roughly parallel to UAE's coastline along the Persian Gulf. The road forms the main artery in some emirates' main cities, where it assumes various alternate names —Sheikh Maktoum Bin Rashid Road and Sheikh Khalifa bin Zayed International Road in Abu Dhabi, Sheikh Zayed Road in Dubai, Al Ittihad Road in Sharjah and Ajman, and Sheikh Muhammad bin Salem Road in Ras Al Khaimah.

The stretch from Ghuwaifat Border with Saudi Arabia to Abu Dhabi, along with E22 Road (Al Ain Road), currently has the highest posted speed limit on Earth at 160 km/h.

== Dubai-Abu Dhabi Highway ==
The Dubai-Abu Dhabi Highway of E 11 links the two largest cities of the United Arab Emirates, Abu Dhabi and Dubai. The project was first proposed in 1968 by the Sheikhs of Abu Dhabi and Dubai to Sheikh Zayed. In 1971, the project was approved and construction began. The highway was completed in 1980. The highway starts near Al Maqta' Bridge in Abu Dhabi and becomes Sheikh Zayed Road in Dubai.

== Sheikh Zayed Road ==
In Dubai, E 11 is known as "Sheikh Zayed Road" (Arabic: شارع الشيخ زايد). This road is the main artery of the city. The highway runs parallel to the coastline from the Trade Centre Roundabout to the border with the emirate of Abu Dhabi, 55 kilometres (34 mi) away in the area of Jebel Ali.

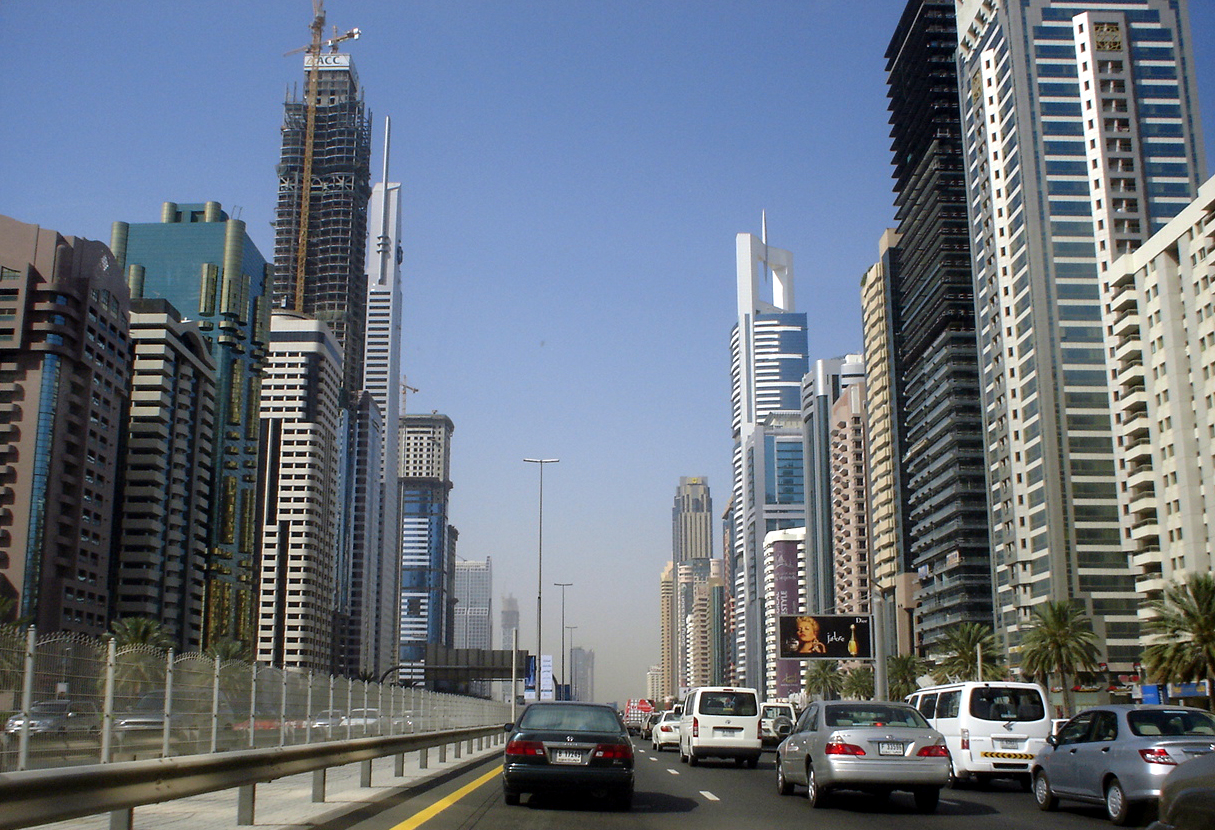
Skyscrapers on Sheikh Zayed Road in July 2006

The road was formerly known as Defence Road. Between 1993 and 1998, 30 kilometres (19 mi) of the road was expanded. Along with this improvement came a change in the name. Sheikh Maktoum bin Rashid Al Maktoum, the Ruler of Dubai at the time, named the road after the then-president of the United Arab Emirates, Sheikh Zayed bin Sultan Al Nahyan.

The E11 is designated as such because "E" stands for Emirates, and the number system was adopted in 1995 to represent nationally and internationally significant high-speed roads within the UAE. The E Route system defines these roads as having limited or controlled access and a speed limit of 100 kilometers per hour or higher. The E11 is part of this system, categorized as a primary road, with its numbering indicating a north-south orientation as per the guidelines detailed in the Abu Dhabi Department of Transport's document TR-538 from 2018.

Overhead view of Sheikh Zayed Road and its skyscrapers

The Sheikh Zayed Road is home to most of Dubai's skyscrapers, including the Emirates Towers. The highway also connects other new developments such as the Palm Jumeirah and Dubai Marina. The road has most of the Red Line of Dubai Metro running alongside it. In Dubai itself much of the highway has seven to eight lanes in each direction.

In 2014, the Dubai Water Canal began construction; as part of the project, a section of the road was removed and a bridge was constructed.

== Incidents ==
=== Traffic pileup ===
On 12 March 2008, approximately 200 vehicles smashed into each other before going up in flames. According to the Abu Dhabi Police, 3 people were killed and 277 injured, 15 of them critically. Thick fog and poor visibility contributed to the deadly pileup. The event is considered to be one of the worst traffic collisions in the UAE's history.

== Exit list ==
In the emirates of Abu Dhabi and Dubai, exits are numbered based on distance starting from east to west within the emirate.

Emirate	Location	km	mi	Exit	Destinations	Notes
Abu Dhabi	Ghuwaifat	0	0.0	-	Ghuwaifat Border Crossing	
Abu Dhabi	Al Sila'a	19.14	11.89	19	Al Sila'a	
Abu Dhabi	Al Wahidah	29.82	18.53	30	Al Wahidah	
Abu Dhabi	Mahmiyat Al Soqour	53.60	33.31	53	Mahmiyat Al Soqour	
Abu Dhabi	Barakah	67.85	42.16	66	Barakah	
Abu Dhabi	Umm al Oshtan	96.71	60.09	95	Umm al Oshtan	
Abu Dhabi	Jebel Al Dannah	115.18	71.57	113	Jebel Al Dannah	
Abu Dhabi	Al Ruwais, UAE	128.77	80.01	127	E 15 (Ghiyathi Road) – Al Ruwais, UAE, Ghayathi	
Abu Dhabi	Al Ruwais, UAE	143.72	89.30	-	Al Rubban Street	
Abu Dhabi	Al Ruwais, UAE	157.92	98.13	158	Baynounah, Thumayriyah	
Abu Dhabi	Gerain Al Ash	176.50	109.67	176	Gerain Al Ash	
Abu Dhabi	Al Harmia	189.32	117.64	189	Al Harmia	
Abu Dhabi	Al Mirfa	202.28	125.69	202A	Al Mirfa (South), Habshan, Madinat Zayed	
Abu Dhabi	Al Mirfa	203.26	126.30	202B	Al Mirfa	
Abu Dhabi	Al Mirfa	213.83	132.87	214	Al Mirfa (East)	
Abu Dhabi	Tarif	231.69	143.97	231	Tarif	
Abu Dhabi	Tarif	243.96	151.59	244	E 45 (Shikha Salama bint Butti Road) – Madinat Zayed, Liwa (Mezaira'a)	
Abu Dhabi	Al Khidayrah	251.21	156.09	251	Abu Al Abyad	
Abu Dhabi	Al Khidayrah	260.61	161.94	261	Ghuwaifat	
Abu Dhabi	Al Khidayrah	270.65	168.17	271	Ghuwaifat	
Abu Dhabi	Al Noof	284.51	176.79	285	Al Rumaitha, Al Noof	
Abu Dhabi	Al Aryam	297.55	184.89	297	Al Aryam	
Abu Dhabi	Al Shinayin	305.46	189.80	305	E 65 (Hameem Road) – Hameem	
Abu Dhabi	Al Aryam	297.55	184.89	297	Al Aryam	
Abu Dhabi	Abu Dhabi Industrial City (ICAD)	312.10	193.93	312A	ICAD	
Abu Dhabi	Abu Dhabi Industrial City (ICAD)	313.04	194.51	312B	ICAD	
Abu Dhabi	Abu Dhabi Industrial City (ICAD)	319.41	198.47	318	ICAD	
Abu Dhabi	Jarn Yafour	321.88	200.01	322A	E 30 (Al Rawdah Road) – Al Ain (Truck Road)	
Abu Dhabi	Jarn Yafour	322.54	200.42	322B	Mussafah, Mohammed bin Zayed City, Abu Dhabi	
Abu Dhabi	Al Mafraq	327.33	203.39	328A	E 22 / M 7 (Al Ain Road) – Al Wathba, Al Ain	
Abu Dhabi	Al Mafraq	327.90	203.75	322B	E 22 (Al Ain Road) – Abu Dhabi, Yas Island	
Abu Dhabi	Al Mafraq	320.32	199.04	320	Mafraq Sheikh Shakbout Medical City, Bani Yas	
Abu Dhabi	Al Shawamekh	332.56	206.64	333	Shakbout City, Al Shawamekh	
Abu Dhabi	Al Shamkha	336.13	208.86	336	Shakbout City, Al Shamkha	
Abu Dhabi	Al Shamkha	340.61	211.65	343A	E 20 (Sweihan Road) – Sweihan	
Abu Dhabi	Al Shamkha	341.71	212.33	343B	E 22 (Sweihan Road) – Abu Dhabi	
Abu Dhabi	Al Falah	344.0	213.8	343C	Airport support facilities	
Abu Dhabi	Al Falah	346.50	215.31	348	Rawdat Al Reef Palace, Al Falah, Al Reef; To E 12 (Khalifa bin Zayed Street) – Yas Island, Saadiyat Island	
Abu Dhabi	Rawdat Al Reef	355.06	220.62	357	Zayed Military City; End of E 10 (Sheikh Zayed bin Sultan Street)	
Abu Dhabi	Abu Mreikhah	358.46	222.74	359	Al Shahama, Zayed Military City	
Abu Dhabi	Abu Mreikhah	365.43	227.07	366	Al Rahba City; E 16 (Al Taf Road) – Al Ajban	
Abu Dhabi	Muwaylih	369.83	229.80	371	Al Rahba, Al Taweelah, Khalifa Port - Kizad	
Abu Dhabi	Al Samha	374.59	232.76	374A	Al Samha	
Abu Dhabi	Khalifa Industrial Zone	375.60	233.39	374B	Kizad B	
Abu Dhabi	Khalifa Industrial Zone	376.21	233.77	374C	Kizad A, Khalifa Port	
Abu Dhabi	Khalifa Industrial Zone	381.03	236.76	381	Al Semeh, Abu Dhabi Sports Aviation Club	
Abu Dhabi	Al Layyan	389.98	242.32	390	E 14 (Al Faqaa Road) – Saih As Sidrah	
Abu Dhabi	Ghantout	398.37	247.54	399	Ghantout	
Abu Dhabi	Ghantout	402.75	250.26	403	E 75 (Al Faya Road) – Seih Sheib	
		404.17 0.00	251.14 0.00	Abu Dhabi-Dubai Border		
Dubai	Jebel Ali Hills	1.51	0.94	2	Saih Shuwaib 1	
Dubai	Jebel Ali Hills	4.65	2.89	5	Dubai Parks and Resorts	
Dubai	Jebel Ali Industrial	13.09	8.13	13A	D 53 east (Al Maktoum Airport Street) – Madinat Al Maktoum	
Dubai	Jebel Ali Industrial	13.98	8.69	13B	D 53 west (Al Maktoum Airport Street) – Jebel Ali Port (Gate 7 and 8)	
Dubai	Jebel Ali Industrial	18.93	11.76	20A	Jebel Ali Central Street	
Dubai	Jebel Ali Industrial	19.27	11.97	20B	E 77 east (Expo Road) – Al Ain, Hatta	
Dubai	Jebel Ali Industrial	19.27	11.97	20C	E 77 west (Expo Road) – Jebel Ali Port (Gate 4)	
Dubai	Jebel Ali Industrial	22.09	13.73	22A	D 57 east (Al Yalayis Street); To E 311 (Mohammed bin Zayed Road)	
Dubai	Jebel Ali Industrial	23.08	14.34	22B	D 57 west (Al Yalayis Street) – Jebel Ali Port (Gate 1 and 3)	
Dubai	Jebel Ali Village	25.34	15.75	25	Al Tahila Street	
Dubai	Jebel Ali Village	26.89	16.71	27	Ibn Battuta Street	
Dubai	Jebel Ali Village	27.89	17.33	29	D 59 (Garn Al Sabkha Street); Bluewaters Island	
Dubai	Dubai Marina	31.42	19.52	32	Al Sarayat Street, Al Naseem Street, Dubai Harbour	
Dubai	Dubai Marina	33.32	20.70	34	Nakhlat Jumeira Street, Al Falak Street, Dubai Harbour; D 61 east (Hessa Street)	
Dubai	Dubai Marina	35.74	22.21	36	D 61 west (Hessa Street) – Jumeira	
Dubai	Al Barsha	31.42	19.52	39	D 63 (Umm Suqeim Street)	
Dubai	Al Qouz	39.91	24.80	40	D 65 (Al Marabea Street)	
Dubai	Al Qouz	42.17	26.20	43	D 65 (Al Manara Street)	
Dubai	Al Qouz	43.93	27.30	44	D 67 west (Umm Al Sheif Street) – Jumeira	
Dubai	Al Qouz	44.25	27.50	45	Al Waha Street	
Dubai	Al Qouz	46.38	28.82	47	D 69 (Al Meydan Street, Al Hadiqa Street)	
Dubai	Al Wasl			48	Al Khaleej Al Tejari 1 Street	
Dubai	Al Wasl			50A	D 71 east (Financial Center Street(Upper Level)); The Dubai Mall	
Dubai	Al Wasl			50B	D 71 east (Financial Center Street(Lower Level)), The Dubai Mall, Burj Khalifa; Al Sukook Street, DIFC	
Dubai	Al Wasl			50C	D 71 west (Al Safa Street)	
Dubai	Al Satwa			51	Al Boursa Street; Museum of the Future	
Dubai	Al Satwa			52	Trade Centre Street	
Dubai	Al Satwa			53	D 73 (Zaa'beel Palace Street, 2nd December Street); D 88 (Sheikh Khalifa bin Zayed Street)	
Dubai	Zaa'beel			54A	D 78 (Umm Hurair Street) – Deira; D 84 (Zaa'beel Street) – Bur Dubai	
Dubai	Zaa'beel			54B	D 75 (Sheikh Rashid Street) – Port Rashid	
Dubai	Zaa'beel			54C	Zaa'beel Street	
Dubai	Zaa'beel			56A	E 66 east (Oud Maitha Road) – Al Ain	
Dubai	Zaa'beel			56B	D 79 west (Oud Maitha Street) – Bur Dubai	
Dubai	Zaa'beel			57	Al Zahrawi Street, Al Jaddaf	
Dubai	Al Garhoud			58A	D 70 (Casablanca Street) – Terminal 1 and 3	
Dubai	Al Garhoud			58B	D 83 (Al Rebat Street) – Umm Ramool, Mirdif, Al Warqa'a; Dubai Festival City	
Dubai	Al Garhoud			60	D 85 (Baniyas Street) – Deira; City Centre Deira	
Dubai	Al Garhoud			61	D 89 (Al Maktoum Street, Airport Road) – Deira, Al Khawaneej; Terminal 1 and 3	
Dubai	Deira			62	D 91 east (Al Quds Street) – Al Twar, Terminal 2 D 91 west (Bu Hail Street) – Abu Hail, Al Wuheida; D 80 (Salah Al Din Street) – Al Ras, Naif	
Dubai	Deira			65	D 93 east (Al Nahda Street) – Al Qusais, Al Mizhar, Muhaisnah; D 93 west (Al Wuheida Street) – Hor Al Anz East, Al Wuheida, Al Hamriya Port	
Dubai	Deira			66	D 95 east (Baghdad Street) – Al Qusais, Al Nahda	
Dubai	Deira			67	D 95 west (Cairo Street) – Al Mamzar	
Dubai	1.000 mi = 1.609 km; 1.000 km = 0.621 mi: Tolled					
