= Speed limits by country =

Highest-posted speed limits around the world. Kilometres per hour are on the left and miles per hour on the right.

Speed limit units on traffic signs around the world: Kilometres per hour (km/h) Miles per hour (mph) Both No speed limit units

A speed limit is the limit of speed allowed by law for road vehicles, usually the maximum speed allowed. Occasionally, there is a minimum speed limit. Advisory speed limits also exist, which are recommended but not mandatory speeds. Speed limits are commonly set by the legislative bodies of national or local governments.

== Overview ==
The following tables show various jurisdictions' default speed limits (where applicable) that apply to different types of vehicles travelling on three different types of road. Actual speed limits may range beyond these values. The enforcement tolerance is specified in km/h or percentage above the stated limit.

Germany is the only country where some motorways do not have a maximum speed limit. The 130 km/h is sign-posted as a general advisory speed limit for motorways in the entry of the country. Due to those Autobahns, Germany is considered a country without a general speed limit on its highways. The Isle of Man is the only jurisdiction without a general speed limit on rural two-lane roads.

The fastest speed limit posted in the countries with a numerical maximum speed limit is 160 km/h, found on two highways in the United Arab Emirates, including the E11 Road (Sheikh Khalifa bin Zayed International Road), specifically the stretch from Ghuwaifat Border with Saudi Arabia to Abu Dhabi, and the E22 Road (Al Ain Road) between Abu Dhabi and Al Ain.

=== Definitions ===
Numerous countries have a different general speed limit for urban roads than on remaining roads. Such differences exist since the beginning of the 20th century, in countries such as United Kingdom and France. This concept is formally defined as road within built-up area in various regulations, including the Vienna Convention, even if the UK has re-branded them as street lighted or restricted areas. More informally they are known as urban roads. In 2017, most of all IRTAD countries have a default speed limit in urban roads of 50 km/h, with various lower speeds, for instance, in the Netherlands, 70% of the urban roads are limited to 30 km/h.

Some countries, for instance the US, India or China, do not have a specific urban road maximum speed.

Different speed limits exist for heavy goods vehicles (HGV) but the limits for HGVs are country dependent: while most Eurasian and American countries might use the Vienna Convention's 3.5-tonne limit, other countries in North America, China, India, Australia or Ireland might use different weight limits.

== Countries ==
(Speed limits are indicated in kilometers per hour (km/h), except as noted.)

Country	Within towns	Controlled-access highway/ motorway/freeway/expressway	Interurban roads outside built-up areas/regional highways	Automobiles & motorcycles	Lorries or automobiles with trailer	Enforcement tolerance
Albania	40	Expressways: 90; Motorways: 110 (130 on the A1);	80	80–90	60–70	10 km/h
Andorra	50	N/A	90	90	90 (automobiles)	N/A
Argentina	40–60	100–130	80	80–110	80	10 km/h
Australia	40–60	100-110 (Note: Default speed limits in Australia vary between states and territories. See Speed limits in Australia for more details.)	100-130 (Note: No special limit applies for automobiles with trailers. A 100 km/h speed limit applies for heavy vehicles with a gross vehicle mass of 12 tonnes or more. A 100 km/h limit applies for buses with a gross vehicle mass of 5 tonnes or more. In some Australian states, Road Trains are limited to 90 km/h. In some cases, over steep descents or other potentially dangerous stretches of road, heavy vehicles may have other special speed limits as indicated by signage.)	100–110	100	Varies by state/territory (Note: In Victoria, the tolerance is 2 km/h for fixed speed cameras, 3 km/h (or 3% for speeds over 100 km/h) for mobile speed cameras. In the other states/territories the official tolerance is not disclosed to the public.)
Austria	50	100 - expressways 130 - motorways	100	100	70/80	3 km/h up to 100 km/h; 3% above
Azerbaijan	40–60	110		90		Up to 10 km/h
Bangladesh	40	80	80	80 (Automobiles) 50 (Motorcycles)	50	10
Bahrain	50	100–120	90	80	70	10
Belarus	60	120 ( 90)	90	90	70 (90 on motorways)	10 km/h
Belgium	20–50	90–120	90; 70 (Flemish Region)	70–90	70–90	6 km/h up to 100 km/h, 6% over
Bhutan	30	N/A	50 (light vehicles and 2-wheelers); 35 (medium and heavy vehicles)	50	N/A	N/A
Bosnia and Herzegovina	50	130 (motorways); 100 (expressways)	80	80	80	10 km/h
Botswana	60	120 (80 for heavy vehicles, vehicles with a trailer and buses)	80	80	80	N/A
Brazil	30–80 (Note: In Brazil, speed limits in urban areas vary according to the functional classification of the road, as follows: Local roads – 30 km/h; Collector roads – 40 km/h; Arterial roads – 60 km/h; High-speed roads – 80 km/h. Local authorities may increase or decrease the national default speeds by 10 km/h.)	110 (Note: The national default speed limit for dual carriageway roads in rural areas is 110 km/h. Local authorities, however, may set speeds as low as 90 km/h or as high as 120 km/h.)	60 (unpaved); 100 (paved) (Note: Since 2016, the national default speed limit for paved single carriageway roads in rural areas has been 100 km/h. Local authorities, however, may set speeds as low as 80 km/h or as high as 110 km/h. For unpaved roads, they may increase or decrease the national default speeds by 10 km/h.)	120 (Note: The highest possible speed in the country, found only on a few highways.)	90 (Note: Until 2016, there was a distinction between buses and other heavy goods vehicles, with the latter having a national default speed limit of 80 km/h. Local authorities may still set speed limits as low as 80 km/h for heavy vehicles on dual carriageway roads, 70 km/h on single carriageway roads, and between 40 km/h and 70 km/h on unpaved roads.)	7 km/h up to 100 km/h, 7% over, rounded to the nearest integer
Brunei	50	100	80	80	80	10 km/h
Bulgaria	50	120 - expressways 140 ( 100) - motorways	90	90 ( 80)	80	10 km/h
Canada	30–50	100–120	60–100		depends on province	Officially 0 (fines specified for 10 km/h over in Alberta), unofficially 20%–40% depending on officer
Chile	30–50	120 (automobiles & motorcycle); 100 (interurban bus only)	90	90	90	10 km/h
China	30–60	100–120	80	60–80	80–100	10% of speed limit
—Hong Kong	50	100–110	70	50–80	50–70	10 km/h
—Macau	20–60	60–80	N/A	50–80	N/A	10 km/h
Colombia	30-50	120 (roads with two or more lanes without pedestrian crossings); 90 (everyone else)	90 (Private vehicles); 80 (Public service vehicles)	90	80	5 km/h
Costa Rica	45	80–100	80	60	60	10 km/h
Croatia	50	130 (motorways); 110 (expressways)	80	90	80	10 km/h up to 100 km/h; 10% over
Cyprus	30–50	100	100	80	80	10 km/h
Czech Republic	50	150 (D3 between Tábor and České Budějovice); 130 (motorways in general); 110—130 (roads for motor vehicles); 80 (urban roads for motor vehicles & motorways)	90	90	80	3 km/h up to 100 km/h; 3% over
Denmark	50	130	80	80	80	10 km/h up to 100 km/h; 10% over (Only for lasers and cameras)
—Faroe Islands	50			80		10 km/h
—Greenland	40–60					
Estonia	50	110–120	90–100	90–120	90	10 km/h
Egypt	60	100–120	90	90–120 (for automobiles); 90–100 (for motorcycles)	60–70 (for trucks); 80–100 (for buses)	20 km/h
Finland	50	80–120	80	80	80	10 km/h
—Åland	50			70–90		10 km/h
France	50	110 (100 in rain) (expressways); 130 (110 in rain) (motorways)	80–90	80–90	60–90	5 km/h up to 100 km/h, 5% above 100 km/h for fixed cameras; doubled for mobile radars
Georgia	60 (20 in residential areas)	110	80	90	70	10
Germany	50	No limit (130 recommended).	100–No limit (130 recommended)	100	60 (trucks over 7,5 t expect Autobahns), 80 (trucks over 3,5 t), 80-100 (certified trailers and coaches)	3 km/h up to 100 km/h, 3% over; differs for different speeding control methods
Greece	50	110 (expressways) 130 (motorways)	80	90	70	10
Hungary	50 (in general); 30 (residential areas); 60–70 (main roads)	110 (expressways); 130 (motorways)	90	90–110	70 on rural roads and expressways. 80 on motorways	15 km/h up to (and including) 100 km/h; 20 km/h over
Iceland	50	90	90	90 (paved roads) / 80 (gravel roads)	80	10
India	50	up to 120, often lower	60	80	65	20
Indonesia	40–60	80–100	80	50–80	60–80	10% of speed limit within towns 20% of speed limit in toll roads.
Iran	50	70–120	70–110	70–110	70–110	20 km/h
Ireland	30–50	120	80 (default but up to 100 where stated)	80	Trucks 90; Trailers 80	Not defined.
Israel	50	100–120	90	80–90	80	20 km/h
Italy	50	130 (110 in adverse weather) (motorways); 110 (expressways)	90	90	70	5 km/h up to 100 km/h; 5% above 100 km/h
Jamaica	50	80–110	80			
Japan	30 (statutory, residential); 60 (statutory)	80–120 (national expressways); 70–80 (single-lane expressways)	60	30 (~50cc); 100–120	80 (trailers); 90 (trucks)	14 km/h with very few exceptions
Jordan	60 or less	120	80	80–120	80–100	20 km/h
Kazakhstan	60 (up to 90 on special roads, 50 for busses and 20 in residential zones)	110 – expressways 140 – motorways	100	110	90–110 (trucks) 70–90 (busses)	20 km/h
South Korea	30–60	80–120	80	80–90	40–60	15 km/h
Latvia	50	90–120	80–90	80–90	80	10 km/h
Lebanon	50	100				20 km/h
Liechtenstein	50	N/A	N/A	80	80	10 km/h
Lithuania	50	110–130	90	70–90	70–90	10 km/h
Luxembourg	50	130 (110 in rain)	90	90	75	3 km/h below 100 km/h; 3% above 100 km/h
North Macedonia	50	120		80–100		10
Malaysia	30–60	90–110	70–90	70–90	70–80; 80–90 (in expressway)	10
Malta	30–50			80	60	10
Mexico	20–50	100–110	80–95	70–90	80–95	20
Moldova	50	No such highways	90 (110 in certain areas only)	90–110	70	9
Monaco	50 (30–70 on some sections of the roads)	N/A	N/A	N/A	N/A	
Morocco	40–60	120	100	100	85–90	10% up to 70 km/h, 7 km/h
Netherlands	50 (30 in residential areas, ca. 70% of urban streets (2008))	130 (motorway default); 100–120 (congested motorways, generally); 100 (expressways)	80	80	80	3 km/h up to 100 km/h; 3% above 100 km/h
New Zealand	30–50	100–110	60–100	100 (30–90 when towing, depending on vehicle)	90 (80 school buses)	10 (school zones, 10)
North Korea	40—70 (in certain areas as low as 5)	80—120	N/A	N/A	N/A	N/A
Norway	50	100–110	80	80	80	10
Pakistan	40	100–120	100	50–80	100	10
Peru	30–50	80–100	100 (90 buses)	60–100	70–80	15
Philippines	20–60	100	40–80	40–80	30–50	20
Poland	50 (20 in residential areas)	100 (single-carriageway expressways); 120 (dual-carriageway expressways); 140 (motorways)	100 (dual-carriageway with at least 2 lanes per direction) 90 (other roads)	90 (up to 140)	80 (motorways, expressways, dual-carriageways with at least 2 lanes per direction) 70 (other roads outside built-up areas)	10
Portugal	50	120	90	90–100	70–80	10
Romania	50 (in certain areas as low as 25)	130 (motorways); 120 (expressways); 80 (expressways in mountainous areas)	90 (100 on highways designated as European Roads)	90–100	70–90	10
Russia	60 (20 in residential areas)	110–130	90	90	70–90	20
San Marino	50	N/A	70	70	N/A	N/A
Saudi Arabia		120–140			80 (Trucks) 80–100 (Buses)	4–10 km/h on highways
Serbia	50	100 (expressways); 130 (motorways)	80	80	80	0 km/h (No tolerance)
Singapore	50	90	60	80–90	60	10-20
Slovakia	50	130 (motorways and expressways); 90–130 (roads for motor vehicles)	90	90	90	3 km/h up to 100 km/h; 3% over for mobile radars.
Slovenia	50	130	80–100	90	80	10
South Africa	60	120	80–100	80–100	80–100	20
Spain	30–50	120 (motorways and expressways)	80–90	90	90 100 (buses)	3–7 km/h up to 100 km/h; 3–7% over, depending on measurement technique
Sweden	50	110–120	70–90	70–100	90 80 (with trailer)	formally 1, but 9 is a common margin (3 deducted from the measured speed and 6 margin)
Switzerland	50, 30, 20	100 (expressways), 120 (motorways)	80	80	80	Only measurement tolerance: 3–14 km/h, depending on measurement method and speed limit
Taiwan	40–60	100–110	80–90	50–80	60–80	10 km/h
Thailand	60–80	Expressway 80 km/h Motorway 120 km/h	100	90	80	25
Turkey	50–70–82	120–130–140 (motorways) ( 100 if L3, 80 if L4, L5, or L7, 0 if L1 or L6)	110 (divided highways)( 90 if L3, 80 if L4, L5, or L7, 45 if L1 or L6); 90 (undivided highways)( 80 if L3, 70 if L4, L5, or L7, 45 if L1 or L6)	90 ( 80 if L3)	80-90 (lorry); 10 km/h under maximum speed limit in given road type (automobile with trailer)	10% over the limit
Ukraine	50 (20 in residential areas)	110–130	90	90	70–90	20
United Arab Emirates	80	140–160	120–140	120	80	
United Kingdom (Note: Speed limits are posted in miles per hour.)	20 mph (32 km/h) some urban/residential areas and built up areas in Wales 30 mph (48 km/h) built up areas 40 mph on some roads in built up areas.	70 mph (112 km/h) (for both motorways and dual-carriageways) (Note: In general, non-urban, all-purpose dual carriageways are subject to the same 70 mph limit for light vehicles as motorways, but lower limits (50 and 60 mph) are in place for heavy trucks, buses/minibuses and towing vehicles. For instance, steeper or more winding alignments and less forgiving junctions than would be found on motorways necessitate lower limits for some stretches.)	60/70 mph (96/112 km/h) (Note: Generally in the UK, lorries over a laden weight of 7,500 kg (7.4 long tons) are speed-limited to 56 mph (90 km/h) even where they are legally permitted a higher speed. There are reduced limits for commercial vehicles and larger passenger vehicle. See Road speed limits in the United Kingdom) dependent on class (motorways); 50/60/70 mph (80/96/112 km/h), ditto (trunk dual-carriageways)	60 mph (96 km/h)	40/50/60 mph (64/80/96 km/h) dependent on class.	10% + 2mph recommended for enforcement, may vary.
Gibraltar	30–50	N/A	N/A	N/A	35 for registered goods vehicles and buses	10
Isle of Man	30 mph (48 km/h)	N/A		No limit	N/A	5 mph (8 km/h)
United States	20–35 mph (32–56 km/h)	85 mph (137 km/h) (Texas SH-130 between I-10 and SH-45); 55–80 mph (89–129 km/h) (generally) (Note: The state of Hawaii posts a 55 mph (89 km/h) speed limit on many Interstate highways.) (Note: One toll road near Austin, TX has a speed limit of 85 miles per hour. TxDOT Approves 85 MPH Limit for Stretch of Toll Road)	50–70 mph (80–113 km/h)	40–65 mph (64–105 km/h) (Note: The lower speed limit in large inner-cities may be as low as 45 mph (72 km/h) for example on I-90/94 which goes through Chicago. In many urban areas, controlled-access highways typically take 5 – 15 mph off the speed limit. For example, in Cleveland and Cuyahoga county, the speed limit is 60 mph (97 km/h). Once out of the county, the speed limit returns to 65 mph (105 km/h).)	Restrictions only in some states, typically 5–15 mph (8.0–24.1 km/h) lower.	Varies by jurisdiction. Some states allow 5 mph (8.0 km/h), while automated enforcement is typically 5–11 mph (8.0–17.7 km/h).
Vatican City	30	N/A	N/A	N/A	N/A	N/A
Venezuela	40–60 kilometres per hour (25–37 mph)	120	60–120	80	40–60	
Vietnam	50–60	120 ( 100)	60–90	60–80	60–80	20 km/h
Yemen	100	N/A	100	100	N/A	No known tolerance, speed limit enforcement is rare.
Zimbabwe	60 kilometres per hour (37 mph)	80–120 kilometres per hour (50–75 mph)		80–120 kilometres per hour (50–75 mph)		

Usual interurban (non urban) speed limit in the European Union (except Cyprus), Albania, Kosovo, Switzerland, and the United Kingdom, outside of motorways and outside of expressways Legend: = 70 km/h; = 80 km/h, = 90 km/h; = 96 km/h (60 mph); = 100 km/h Source Europa.eu

National speed limits for heavy goods vehicle (HGV) (>3.5 tonnes according to Vienna convention) in the European Union, Kosovo, Switzerland, and the United Kingdom, on all roads including motorways Legend: = 60 km/h; = 70 km/h, = 80 km/h, = 90 km/h; = 100 km/h; = 110 km/h; = 112 km/h (70 mph) source Europa.eu
