= Al Dhafrah Region Municipality =

Municipality in the Emirate of Abu Dhabi, UAE

Coordinates: 24°5′20″N 53°58′3″E

- بلدية الظفرة

Agency overview
- Formed: 2006; 20 years ago
- Jurisdiction: Al Dhafra Region
- Headquarters: Sheikha Salama Bint Butti Road – Madinat Zayed
- Agency executive: Humood Humaid Al Mansoori, General Manager
- Parent agency: Department of Municipalities and Transport
- Website: dmt.gov.ae/drm

Al Dhafrah Region Municipality (DRM) (Arabic: بلدية الظفرة), formerly Western Region Municipality (WRM) is a municipality in the Emirate of Abu Dhabi, covering the al-Dhafra region. It was constituted in 2006 and is responsible for the region's planning, development and urbanization as well as other range of local government functions.

== Description ==
In May 2006 Sheikh Khalifa Bin Zayed Al Nahyan, President of the UAE and Ruler of the Emirate of Abu Dhabi, issued law no. 10 stating the Western Region Municipality shall operate independently with full legal capacity (under the umbrella of the Department of Municipal Affairs).

The law also stated that the municipality is to be administered by the administrative body, constituted by a number of departments and specialized sections in accordance with the organizational structure adopted by the municipal Council. It is headed by the General Manager of the Municipality, and is responsible for providing and delivering municipal services to the people of the Western Region and to implement the decisions of the municipal council and all the internal and relevant regulations issued by the council.

A municipal authority was established to support the Municipal Council, which is responsible for raising the level of services throughout the region. The municipal council contains 16 members, with representatives from each of the region’s six main areas: Madinat Zayed, Mirfa, Liwa, Sila, Ghayathi and Delma to encourage wider participation on decision making.

== WRM services ==
1. Distribution and transfer of lands to citizen.
2. Maintenance of parks and recreational facilities, including greenery and beautification programs. The municipality will ensure the availability of clean public spaces for families and children.
3. Operation of the Centers for Integrated Government Services (TAMM) in Madinat Zayed, Mirfa, Delma Island, Sila and Ghayathi, with more to come in Liwa.
4. Property Management, including the buying, selling and transfer of properties.
5. Issuance of building permits.
6. maintenance of roads, except national highway, in the Western Region to ensure safe and comfortable travel for residents.
