= Sila =

Sila may refer to:

== Places ==
- Sila Region, Chad
  - Sila Department, Chad, part of Sila Region
- La Sila, a mountainous area of Calabria, Italy
  - Sila National Park
- Sila, Numidia, a former ancient city and bishopric, now Bordj-El-Ksar in Algeria and a Latin Catholic titular see
- Siła, Warmian-Masurian Voivodeship, a village in Poland
- Sila, Abu Dhabi, United Arab Emirates
- Šila, Lithuania

== Religion and mythology ==
- Śīla (in Sanskrit) or sīla (in Pāli), "behavioral discipline", "morality", "virtue" or "ethics" in Buddhism
- Sila (mythology), in Arab folklore a type of jinn, or genie
- Sila (murti), in Hinduism a murti or vigraha in the form of a stone
- Silap Inua (sila), in Inuit mythology, the primary component of everything that exists

== Businesses ==
- SiLA (airlines), a Russian regional airline
- Sila Nanotechnologies, a battery manufacturer
- Svensk Interkontinental Lufttrafik AB, a Swedish airline

== Entertainment ==
- Sila (2016 TV series), a Pakistani drama series
- Sıla (TV series), a Turkish television series
- Sila (film), a 1988 Indian film directed by B. R. Ishara

== People ==
- Sıla (given name), a list of people with the Turkish feminine name
- Sila María Calderón (born 1942), Puerto Rican politician
- Sila Godoy (1919–2014), Paraguayan guitarist
- Sila Mutungi, lead singer of the band Sila and the Afrofunk Experience
- Sila Srikampang (born 1989), Thai footballer
- Sıla (singer), Turkish singer Sıla Gençoğlu (born 1980)
- Alo Sila, American football player
- Sila or Si La people, an ethnic group of Vietnam and Laos

== Other uses ==
- Sila language (Sino-Tibetan), a language of Vietnam and Laos spoken by the Si La people
- Sila language (Chad), a language of Chad
- Aero East Europe Sila, a Serbian family of light aircraft
- Society of Illustrators of Los Angeles, a not-for-profit organization
- Standardization in Lab Automation, a not-for-profit organization
- The primary body of Sila–Nunam, an object in the Solar System
- A volume also known as a "bowl" in ancient Mesopotamian units of measurement

== See also ==
- Silaa, a 2020 album by Zubeen Garg
- Scylla (disambiguation)
- Silla (disambiguation)
- Shila (disambiguation)
- Selah (disambiguation)
