= Western Region Ports =

The Western Region Ports (Arabic: موانئ المنطقة الغربية) are five ports run by Abu Dhabi Ports in Al Dhafra Region of the Emirate of Abu Dhabi, United Arab Emirates. These include ports in Mugharrag, Al Sila, Sir Bani Yas, Dalma and Marfa. The ports support local communities in the region and facilitate the transport of people and goods to offshore islands. In addition, they support local industries including fishing, tourism, logistics and leisure activities.

== See also ==
- Al Ain
- Abu Dhabi, the capital of the UAE.
- Khalifa Port, the state-of-the art gateway to Abu Dhabi which handles all of the emirate's container traffic; the only semi-automated container terminal in the Middle East.
- Kizad, one of the world's largest free and non-free industrial zones.
- Musaffah Port, the dedicated port for Abu Dhabi's Musaffah Industrial Zone.
- Zayed Port, the port of Abu Dhabi city.
