= Silla (disambiguation) =

Silla was a Korean kingdom from 57 BC to 935 AD.

Silla may also refer to:

== Arts and religion ==
- Crowns of Silla, ceremonial artifacts made in the kingdom of Silla
- Silap Inua, a deity in Inuit mythology
- Zillah (biblical figure) or Tselah (צִלָּה), one of Lamech's wives in the Bible
- A character in Barnabe Rich's History of Apolonius and Silla in his Farewell to Military Profession (1581)

=== Music ===
- Silla (Handel), 1713 opera seria by George Frideric Handel
- Silla (Graun), 1753 opera by Graun
- Lucio Silla, a Mozart opera
- Mr. Silla & Mongoose, an Icelandic electronic music group

== People ==
- Silla (name)
- Sulla (died 78 BC), Roman general and dictator
- Silla (rapper) (born 1984), German rapper formerly known as Godsilla

== Places ==
- Silla, Sultanpur Lodhi, a village in India
- Silla, Valencia, a town in Spain
- Silla (Senegal River Valley), an ancient town and kingdom on the Senegal River in West Africa

=== Estonia ===
- Silla, Lääne County, village in Kullamaa Parish, Lääne County
- Silla, Pärnu County, village in Paikuse Parish, Pärnu County
- Silla, Saare County, village in Mustjala Parish, Saare County

=== Elevations named after the Spanish word silla ===
- Silla Pata, a mountain in Bolivia
- Silla Qhata, a mountain in Peru
- Silla Q'asa (disambiguation)
- The Cerro de la Silla 1,820 m (5,971 ft) to the east of Monterrey, Mexico
- La Silla, the location of the La Silla Observatory
- Silla de Paita, a hill near the northern Peruvian sea port Paita
- A hill in Cuba overlooking Gibara

== Other ==
- Silla language, spoken in the Korean kingdom
- Silla University in Busan, South Korea
- Silla restoration movement in the 12th century in Korea
- Silla–Tang alliance in the 12th century in Korea
- Silla (month), the fourth month in the Nepal Era calendar
- Silla CF, a Spanish football club based in the city of the same name
- Silla, the kind of litter carried by Sillero porters in the Americas

== See also ==
- Scylla (disambiguation)
- Shilla (disambiguation)
- Sila (disambiguation)
- Zillah (disambiguation)
