= Shilla =

Shilla may refer to:

== Geography ==
- Silla, or Shilla, an ancient Korean kingdom (57 BC – 936 AD)
- Shilla District, a district of Carhuaz Province, Peru
- Shilla (mountain), a mountain peak in Himachal Pradesh, India
- Shilla Col, a col in the Trans-Himalayan region of Spiti, Himachal Pradesh, India

== Other ==
- Illiasu Shilla (born 1982), Ghanaian footballer
- Shilla (social grouping) of close friends of similar age, background, in Egypt or Saudi Arabia
- Hotel Shilla, a South Korean operator of luxury hotels

== See also ==
- Silla (disambiguation)
