= E 30 road (United Arab Emirates) =

Highway in the middle eastern country

Al Rawdah Road
- إ ٣٠
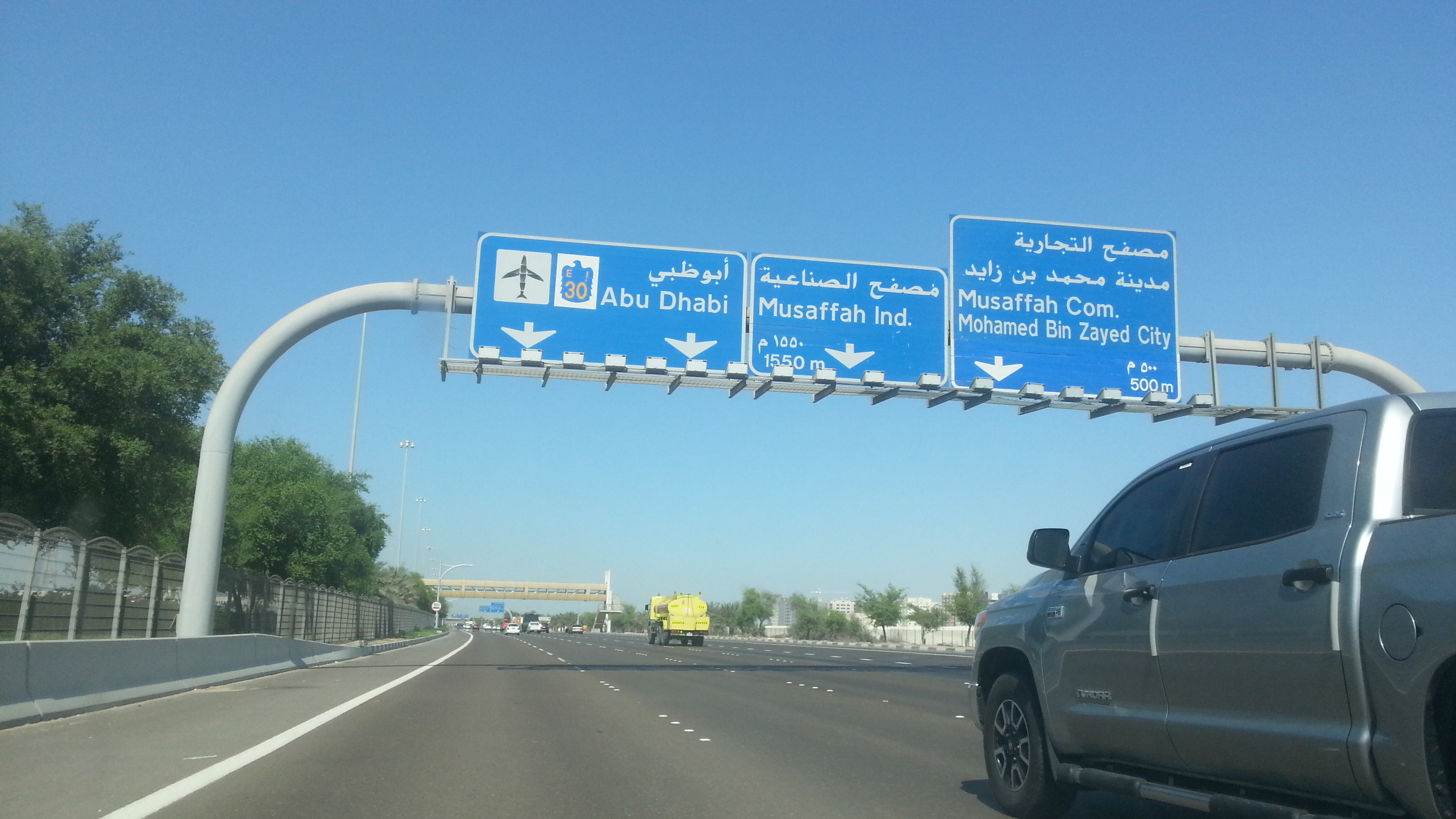
- A stretch of E 30 westbound towards Abu Dhabi near Mussafah

Route information
- Length: 124 km (77 mi)

Major junctions
- E 22 - Al Ain Road; E 20 - Al Khaleej Al Arabi Street; Naseem Al Barr Street, Abu Dhabi; E 311 - Sheikh Mohammed bin Rashid Al Maktoum Street; E 75 - Al Haffa Road; E 65 - Liwa - Abu Dhabi Road; E 40 - Malad Road; Shakbout bin Sultan Street, Al Ain; E 40 - Al Nimma Road

Location
- Country: United Arab Emirates

Highway system
- Transport in the United Arab Emirates; Roads in Dubai

E 30 is one of the main roads of the United Arab Emirates (UAE). The road connects the city of Abu Dhabi and Al Ain. It is colloquially called Abu Dhabi-Al Ain Truck Road, but is officially named Al Rawdah Road. and is approximately parallel with E 22 - Al Ain Road.

== Uses ==
Being intended as a truck route, It mostly serves trucks and therefore has a lower speed limit of 80 km/h (as opposed to other freeways, including the E 22, with a speed limit of 160 km/h). However, the speed limit is not strictly enforced. 29% of the vehicles using the E 30 are lightweight vehicles, which account for 73% (43) of the 59 accidents from 2014 to 2017.

The E 30 is the main link for trucks carrying goods from western UAE (i.e. Abu Dhabi) to the border of Oman, as E 30 merges to E 40 at western Al Ain, 42km from the border between the UAE and Oman.

== Accidents ==
Accidents are relatively common on E 30, with 1,065 injuries and fatalities reported from 2009 to 2013. Accidents also tend to be more severe on E 30, with an average severity rate of 34, 21% higher than the average in UAE (28).

One of the most famous accidents involving the highway happened on 4 February, 2013, in which 24 workers died and 24 were injured in a collision between a bus and a train near Al Rawda Palace 35 km from Al Ain. The road was compared with a Russian roulette, a term metaphorically used to describe a very dangerous game of chance.
