= Toyota Building, Dubai =

Nasser Rashid Lootah Building

General information
- Year built: 1974
- Demolished: January 2027

The Nassir Rashid Lootah Building (locally and more popularly known as the Toyota Building) is a 15-storey office building located on Sheikh Zayed Road in Dubai, United Arab Emirates. Completed in 1974, the building has become a local landmark due to witnessing the transformation of Dubai from a rapidly developing city into a global metropolis. As well as the familiar Toyota sign on top, which has stood since 1981. The building is scheduled to be demolished in 2027.

== History ==
The building was completed in 1974 in a then-growing Dubai. Located along one of the area's first highways, it was one of the first tall buildings in the Dubai area. In 1981, a Toyota and Daihatsu sign was installed on the roof, which then became one of the city's most recognizable landmarks along the highway, as well as the building being one of the few to experiencing Dubai transform from a growing city to a global business and tourism hub.

The building is to be demolished by January 2027 due to overcrowing concerns, and unauthorized apartments taking place inside.

== Toyota sign ==
The building's most recognizable feature, the Toyota sign, which stands on the roof, was first installed in 1981. It was removed in 2018 after the advertising contract expired, but was brought back in 2022 due to nostalgia for such sign.
