= Speed limits in the United Arab Emirates =

The United Arab Emirates employs minimum and maximum speed limits, which vary for different types of vehicles and roads. The roads are monitored by speed cameras to detect traffic violations such as speeding. Heavy vehicles such as trucks, mini buses and buses are installed with speed limiters to prevent over-speeding. The UAE is notable for having some of the highest posted speed limits in the world. Speed limits in the Emirate of Abu Dhabi are generally higher than the other Emirates. The general speed limit in Abu Dhabi is 140 km/h whereas in the Northern Emirates and Dubai Speed Limit is 120km/h. Every Emirate with the exception of Abu Dhabi also has a speed buffer, allowing motorists to drive 20 km/h above the posted speed limit without any fines.

== Speed limits ==
=== Light motor vehicle ===
Road types	Speed limit	Ref.
Freeway	100–140 km/h (62–87 mph)	
Rural roads	100–140 km/h (62–87 mph)	
Urban dual carriageway	60–80 km/h (37–50 mph)	
Urban single carriageway (Residential areas)	40–60 km/h (25–37 mph)	
Parking areas and service roads	25 km/h (16 mph)	
Residential Areas	25-40 km/h	
