= Emirates College for Advanced Education =

Coordinates: 24°25′16.1″N 54°35′48.0″E

- Motto: Inspire, Empower, Teach
- Established: 2007
- Focus: Education
- Chair: HE Sarah Yousef Al Amiri
- Vice Chancellor: Dr. May Laith Al Taee
- Key people: Dr. May Laith Al Taee, Vice Chancellor
- Budget: Government Funded
- Address: PO Box 126662
- Location: Abu Dhabi
- Website: www.ecae.ac.ae

Emirates College for Advanced Education (ECAE) was officially established in 2007 and commenced teaching its first group of undergraduate students in September 2007 and its first group of postgraduate students in October 2007.

The College is a specialist teacher training college in the UAE. It was established to be a teacher preparation, educational research and school development centre and is funded by government to play a key role in the modernization of school education in the UAE and throughout the Middle East in collaboration with the Abu Dhabi Education Council (ADEC).

== Licensure and accreditation ==
ECAE, located in the Emirate of Abu Dhabi, was officially licensed from 1 April 2011 by the Ministry of the Higher Education and Scientific Research of the United Arab Emirates to award degrees in higher education.

== Location ==
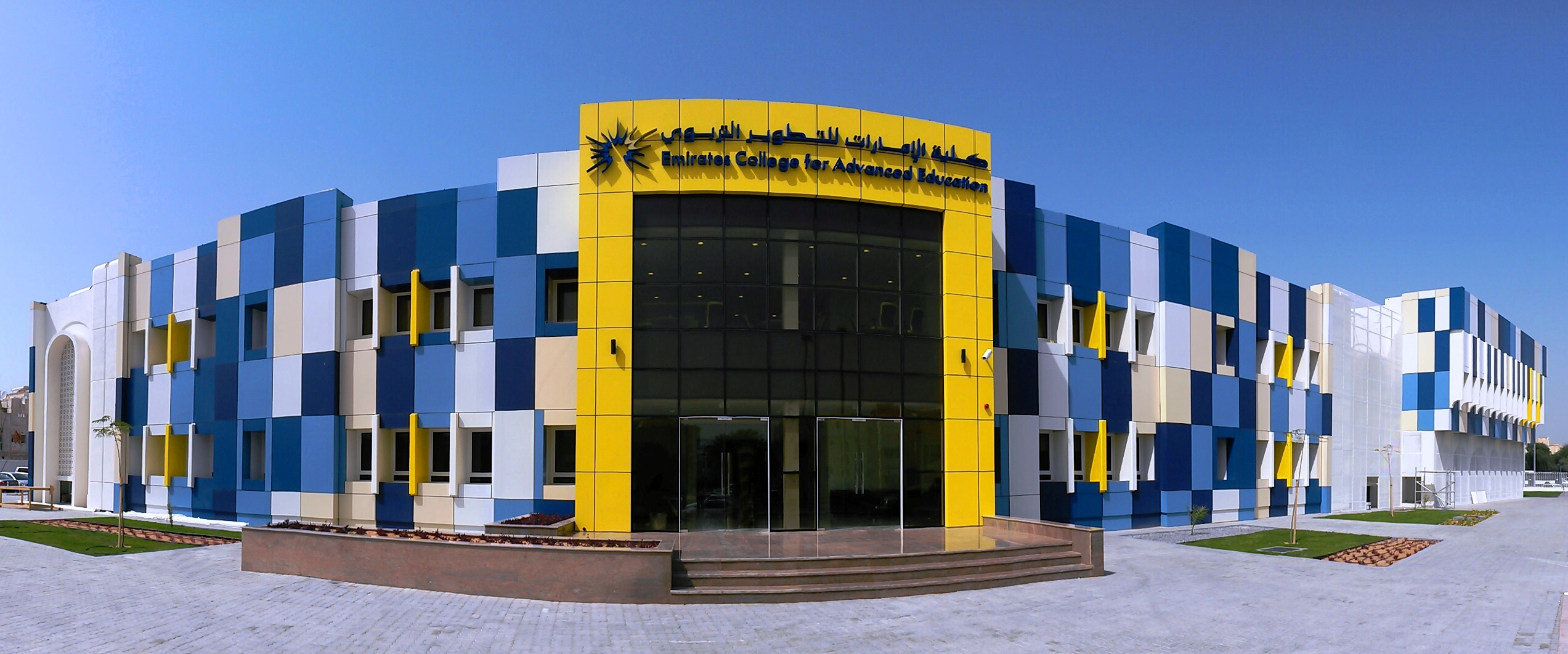
ECAE Campus

The main campus is located in Khalifa A - AlAsayil street we have other branches in AlAin and Ajman.

== Programs offered ==
=== Bachelor of Education (B.Ed) ===
ECAE offers a Bachelor of Education program which is structured over four years. The Bachelor of Education has seven concentrations as follows:

- Special Needs Education
- Art and Music
- Early Childhood Education
- Counselling in Education
- Information Technology Education
- Health and Physical Education
- Applied Behavior Analysis [The Behavior Analyst Certification Board, Inc.® has approved the following course sequence as meeting the coursework requirements for eligibility to take the Board Certified Assistant Behavior Analyst Examination®. Applicants will have to meet additional requirements to qualify.]

=== Post Graduate Diploma in Education (PGDE) ===
The Postgraduate Diploma in Education program is a responsive and flexible one year modular program that is aligned with Level 8 in the UAE Qualification Framework - QF Emirates. It not only provides a route into teaching for those whose first degree is not in education but also offers an option for in-service practitioners without teaching qualifications to refresh their teaching skills. The Postgraduate Diploma in Education consists of mandatory courses which total 28 credits.

=== Master of Education (M.Ed) ===
The Master of Education (M.Ed) Program is a 36 credit-based two year degree program aligned with Level 9 in the UAE Qualification Framework - QF Emirates. The program focuses on Education practitioners, leaders, administrators and professionals in a broad range of field and is also suitable for other professionals whose work has an educational component or some educational responsibility. The following tracks are offered within the program:

- Special Education
- Mathematics Education
- Science Education
- Social Studies
- Educational Technology
- Educational Leadership
- Early Childhood
- TESOL

The M.Ed is offered over four semesters, and the final semester includes either a capstone project or a research project.

All programs offered are accredited by the Commission for Academic Accreditation.

== Areas of research ==
The main areas of research conducted by the College fall within the following categories:

- Comparative and International Education
- Multilingual teaching and learning
- Effective pedagogy and methodology
- School reform / improvement
- The study of teacher education and preparation Curriculum and instruction development Education development in the UAE and GCC.
