= Shilla (social grouping) =

A shilla is a male fraternity in Saudi Arabia, Egypt and other countries.
