= Al Darah, Ras Al Khaimah =

Coordinates: 26.0498°N 56.0876°E

Al Darah is the main border crossing between Ras Al Khaimah in the United Arab Emirates (UAE) and Musandam, an exclave of Oman. Although occasionally referred to as Ras Al Darah, it is a land crossing.
