= Ghayathi =

Ghayathi غَـيَـاثِي (in Arabic)
- Town
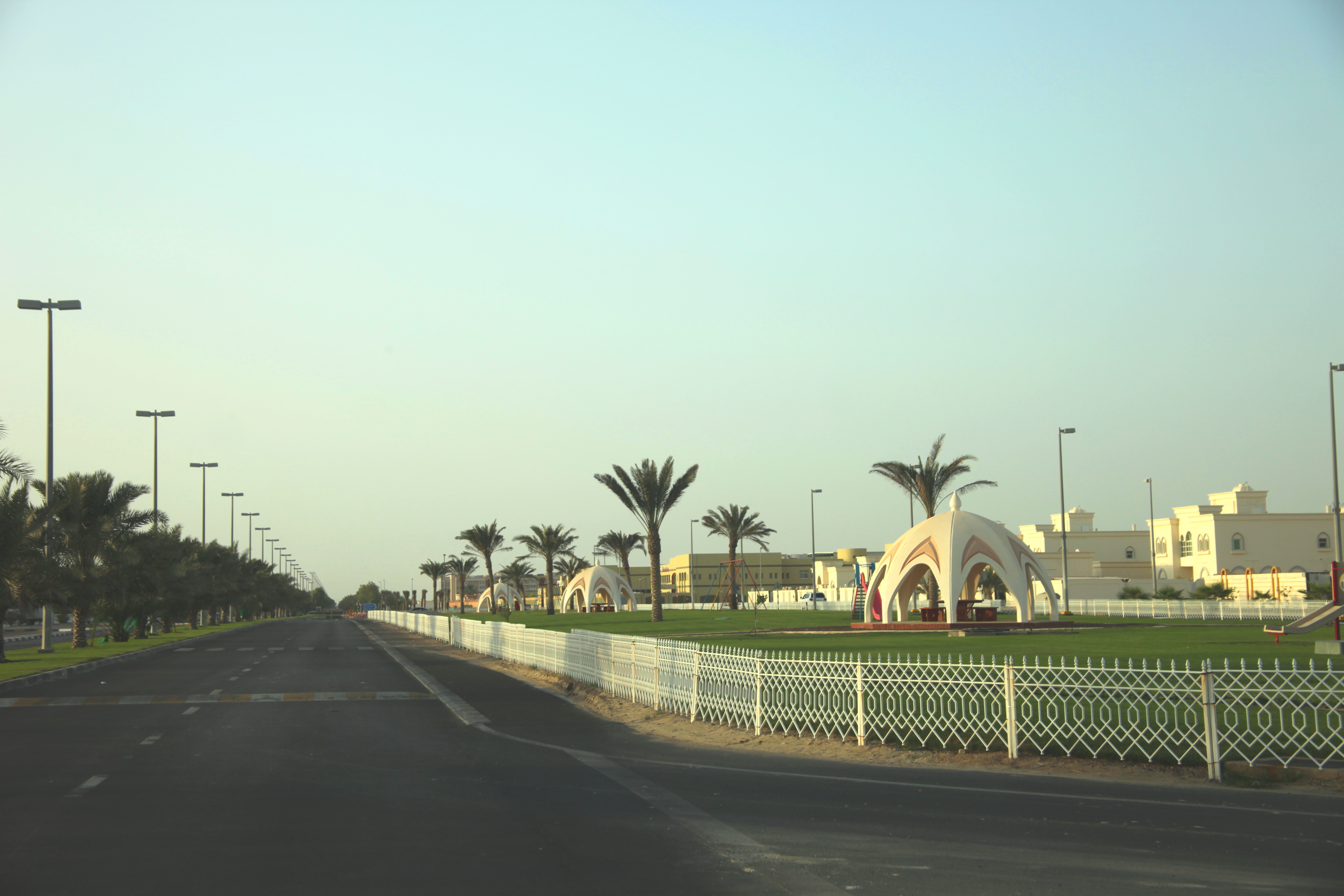

- Location of Ghayathi in the UAE
- Coordinates: 23°50′33″N 52°48′36″E
- Country: United Arab Emirates
- Emirate: Abu Dhabi
- Municipal region: Al Dhafra

Government
  - Sheikh: Mohamed bin Zayed Al Nahyan
  - Ruler's Representative of Al Dhafra region: Hamdan bin Zayed Al Nahyan

Population (2015)
  - Total: 34,333
- Time zone: UTC+4 (UAE Standard Time)

Ghayāthī (Arabic: غَـيَـاثِي) is a town in the Al Dhafra region of the Emirate of Abu Dhabi. It has a population of 34,333 based on a 2015 census. Originally a bedouin settlement, today many inhabitants work in agriculture.

Ghayathi is situated 250 km (160 miles) from the city of Abu Dhabi and 20 km (12 miles) from the coast. The principal road is E15, which connects the town with the E11 near Ruwais in the north, and Aradah in the Liwa Oasis in the south. Another road leads to Madinat Zayed.

== History ==
Ghayathi had a population of 14,022 in a 2005 census.
