= Al Dhafra, Abu Dhabi =

Western region of the Emirate of Abu Dhabi

Al Dhafra Minṭaqah Aẓ-Ẓafrah (Arabic: مِنْطَقَة ٱلظَّفْرَة) Al Gharbia Western Region Al-Minṭaqah Al-Ġarbiyyah (Arabic: ٱلْمِنْطَقَة ٱلْغَرْبِيَّة)
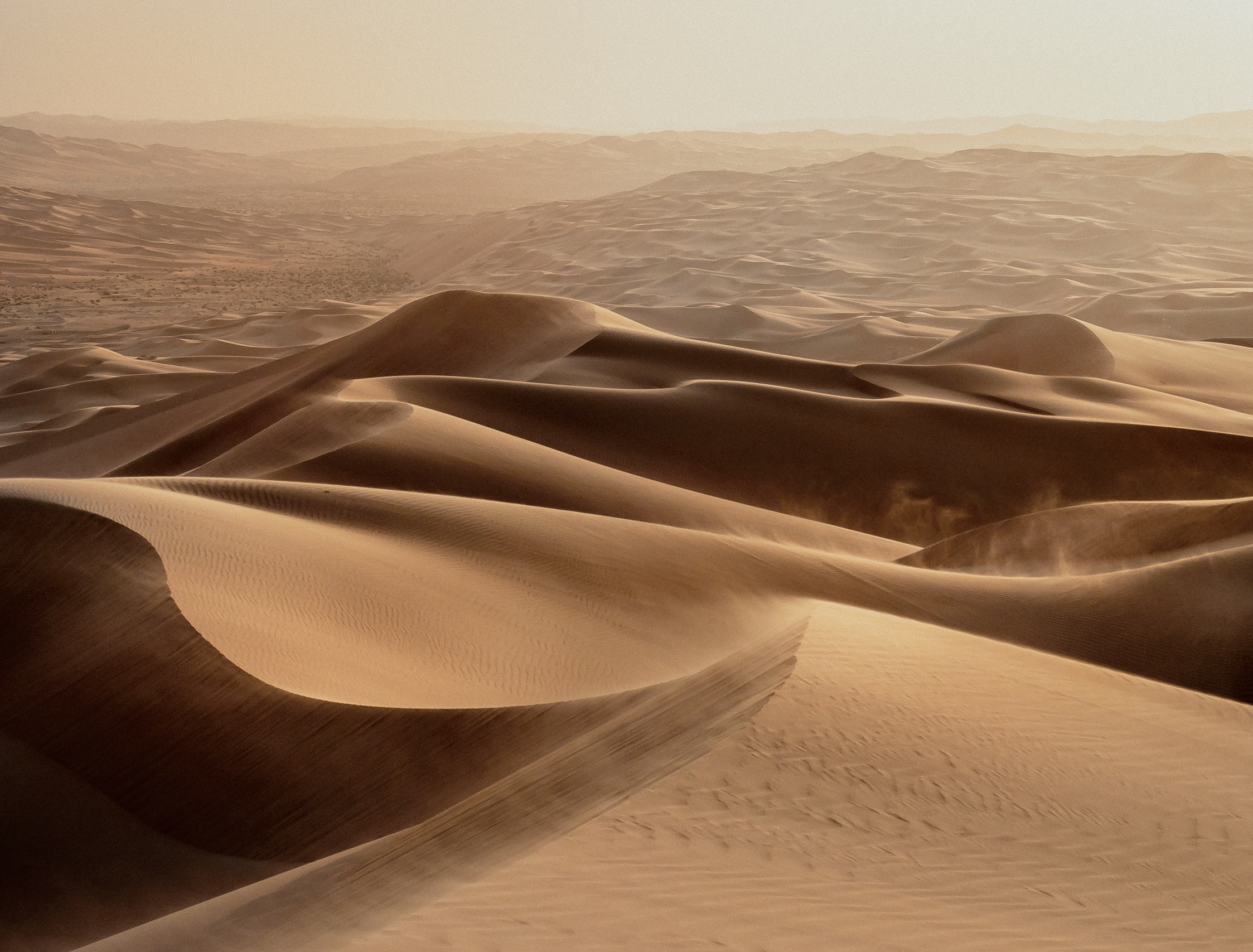
- Dunes near Liwa Oasis in the region of Ar-Rub' Al-Khali

- Flag Coat of arms

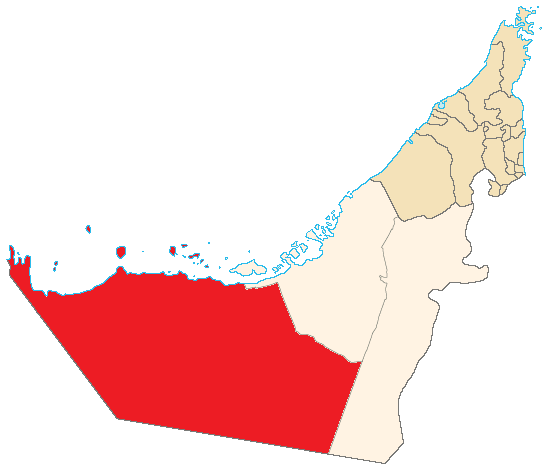
- Location of the Western Region in the Emirate of Abu Dhabi
- Coordinates: 23°39′N 53°42′E
- Country: United Arab Emirates
- Emirate: Abu Dhabi
- Seat: Madinat Zayed

Government
  - Type: Absolute monarchy
  - Emir: Mohammed bin Zayed Al Nahyan
  - Ruler's Representative of the Western Region of the Emirate of Abu Dhabi: Hamdan bin Zayed bin Sultan Al Nahyan
  - Municipality: Al Dhafrah Region Municipality

Population (2023)
  - Total: 284,205
- Time zone: UTC+4 (UAE standard time)
  - Summer (DST): UTC+4

Al Dhafra Region (Arabic: مِنْطَقَة ٱلظَّفْرَة, romanized: Minṭaqah aẓ-Ẓafrah), known until 2017 as Al Gharbia or the Western Region (Arabic: ٱلْمِنْطَقَة ٱلْغَرْبِيَّة, romanized: Al-Minṭaqah al-Ġarbiyyah), is one of three Municipal Regions in the Emirate of Abu Dhabi. Forming the western part of the United Arab Emirates, it is by far the largest region by area, occupying 71% of the Abu Dhabi emirate's total area, yet the smallest by population and population density, and thus a rather remote region of the Emirate of Abu Dhabi, similar to the Eastern Region. The capital of Al Dhafra Region is Madinat Zayed (Bida Zayed). The new official name was already the historical name of the westernmost region of former Trucial Oman, which was Dhafrah. It is significant for its natural resources, particularly gas and petroleum. Its reserves of hydrocarbons account for 90% of the Emirate's reserves, which in turn account for 90% of the country's reserves, and are important for the local economy.

== Demographics ==
The Region had a population of 202,154 as of the Census of 2010 (including Islands Region with 17,646). With a given population density of 6, the area of the region could be calculated at 33,700 square kilometres (13,000 square miles). Other official sources, however, state an area of 59,760 square kilometres (23,070 square miles), or an 83 percent share of the emirate total of 72,000 square kilometres (28,000 square miles).

This region comprises seven townships, with population figures of the 2005 census of population (109,000 for the region):

1. Madinat Zayed (Bida Zayed) (pop. 29,095)
2. Ruwais (pop. 15,511)
3. Ghayathi (pop. 14,022)
4. Liwa (pop. 20,192)
5. Al Mirfa (pop. 14,503)
6. Sila (pop. 7,900, includes Ghuwaifat)
7. Dalma (pop. 4,811)

Also of note is Habshan.

Al Gharbia's coastal communities are served with six Western Region Ports built, developed and managed by Abu Dhabi Ports Company (ADPC). These include Mugharrag, Al Sila, Sir Bani Yas, Dalma and Marfa Ports. The ports support local industries like fishing, tourism, logistics and leisure activities as well as facilitating the transport of people and goods to offshore islands.

== Wildlife and prehistory ==
7 million-year-old fossilized footprints of elephants have been discovered at a site named "Mleisa 1" in Al-Gharbia. Within the area of Baynunah, a camel-slaughter site dating to about 6,000 years ago was discovered.

== See also ==
- Abu Dhabi Region
- Hazza bin Sultan Al Nahyan
- List of cultural property of national significance in the United Arab Emirates
- List of tourist attractions in the United Arab Emirates
- Western Region Municipality
