= Madinat Zayed =

Madinat Zayed Madīnat Zāyid (مَدِيْنَة زَايِد)
- Location in the U.A.E. Madinat Zayed (Persian Gulf) Madinat Zayed (Middle East) Madinat Zayed (West and Central Asia)
- Coordinates: 23°39′8″N 53°39′13″E
- Country: United Arab Emirates
- Emirate: Abu Dhabi
- Municipal region: Al Dhafra

Government
  - Ruler of Abu Dhabi: Mohamed bin Zayed Al Nahyan
  - Ruler's Representative of the Western Region of the Emirate of Abu Dhabi: Hamdan bin Zayed bin Sultan Al Nahyan

Population (2015)
  - Total: 46,862
- Time zone: UTC+4 (UAE Standard Time)

Madinat Zayed (Arabic: مَدِيْنَة زَايِد, romanized: Madīnat Zāyid, lit. 'City of Zayed') is the largest city and the administrative centre of Al Dhafra, the westernmost and largest region in the Emirate of Abu Dhabi. The township was established in 1968 by Sheikh Zayed bin Sultan Al Nahyan, the late Ruler of Abu Dhabi and President of the UAE. In the census of 2005, the city had 29,095 inhabitants.

== Location ==
Madinat Zayed is situated 180 km (110 miles) southwest of the capital city of Abu Dhabi, and 50 km (31 miles) from the coast. The principal road is E45, which connects the town with the E11 in the north and the Liwa Oasis in the south. Another main road leads to Ghayathi.

== Sports ==
Madinat Zayed is home to Al Dhafra FC, a team that once competed in the UAE top division football league, the UAE Pro League, and Al Dhafra futsal club.

== See also ==
- Al Ain, administrative centre of the Eastern Region
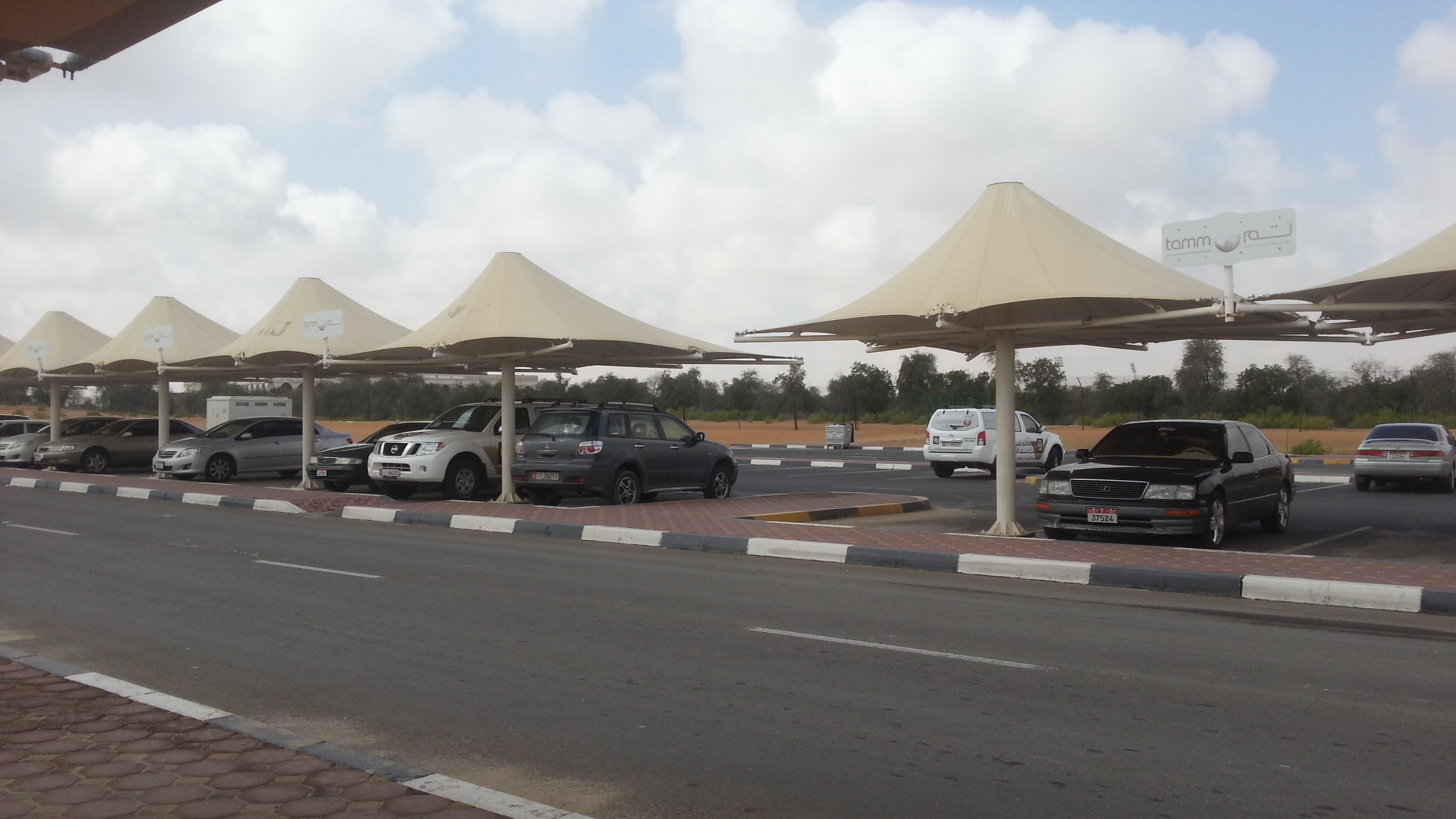
- Madinat Zayed, 2014
  Ghuwaifat
