= Silla Q'asa =

Silla Q'asa (Quechua silla gravel, q'asa mountain pass, "gravel pass", also spelled Silla Ccasa, Silla Khasa, Sillacasa, Sillaccasa, Sillajasa) may refer to:

- Silla Q'asa (Cochabamba), a mountain in the Cochabamba Department, Bolivia
- Silla Q'asa (Peru), a mountain in the Ayacucho Region, Peru
- Silla Q'asa (Potosí), a mountain in the Potosí Department, Bolivia
