= E 22 road (United Arab Emirates) =

Road in the United Arab Emirates

E 22
- إ ٢٢

Route information
- Part of
- Length: 125 km (78 mi)

Major junctions
- West end: Al Mafraq Bridge
- E 20 - Al Khaleej Al Arabi Street; E 11 - Khalifa bin Zayed Intl' Highway/Maktoum bin Rashid Road; E 311 - Sheikh Mohammed bin Rashid Al Maktoum Street; E 75 - Al Haffar Road; E 16 - Al Taf Road
- East end: Khalifa bin Zayed Street

Location
- Country: United Arab Emirates
- Major cities: Abu Dhabi, Al Ain

Highway system
- Transport in the United Arab Emirates; Roads in Dubai

E 22 (Arabic: شارع ﺇ 22), is a major highway in the Emirate of Abu Dhabi, United Arab Emirates (UAE). The road travels between the emirates's biggest cities of Abu Dhabi and Al Ain, and is called simply, Al Ain Road (Arabic: شارع العين). The west end of the road starts at Al Mafraq Bridge in the Rabdan area in Abu Dhabi, runs across the desert of Al Wathba, and ends in the west end of Khalifa bin Zayed Street in Al Maqam, Al Ain. E 22, along with a stretch of E11 Road, currently has the highest posted speed limit in the world, at 160 km/h.

== See also ==
- Abu Dhabi Department of Municipalities and Transport
