= Emirates Future International Academy =

Location
- Mussafah, Abu Dhabi; UAE
- Coordinates: 24°20′7″N 54°31′56″E

Information
- Type: Private
- Motto: Education Leads To Perfection
- Established: 2008
- Chairman: Dr. Francis Cleetus
- Gender: Co-educational
- Language: English
- Website: www.efiaschool.com

Emirates Future International Academy (EFIA) is a school in Abu Dhabi, United Arab Emirates. The school is affiliated to the Central Board of Secondary Education of India. EFIA was established in 2008. EFIA is a sister concern of The Wisdom High School and Al Maali Private School. The School opened after the closing of The Wisdom High School. The School has 2900 students and 160 teachers approximately.

== History ==
EFIA started in the year 2008 with 869 students and 53 teachers; but now, it has 2900 students.
