= Shilla Col =

Coordinates: 32°25′38″N 78°12′16″E

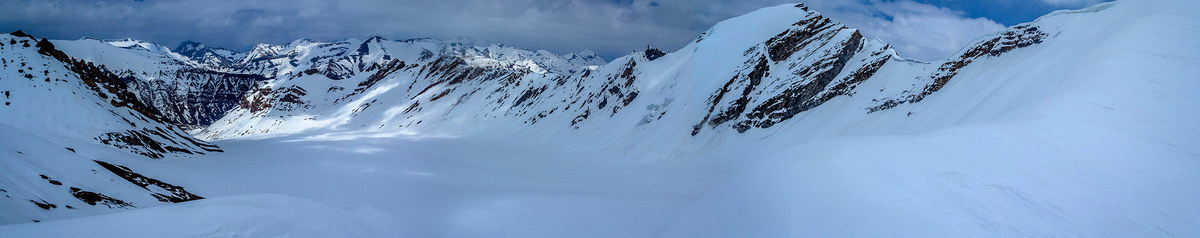
Panorama from Shilla Col (North East View towards Lakhang Nala, upper Lingti Valley & Gya peaks)

Shilla Col (5725 m; 18,783 ft) is a col in the remote Trans-Himalayan region of Spiti, Himachal Pradesh, India. It connects Shilla Nullah to Upper Lingti Valley. Coordinates are: 32°25'38"N 78°12'16"E

== History ==
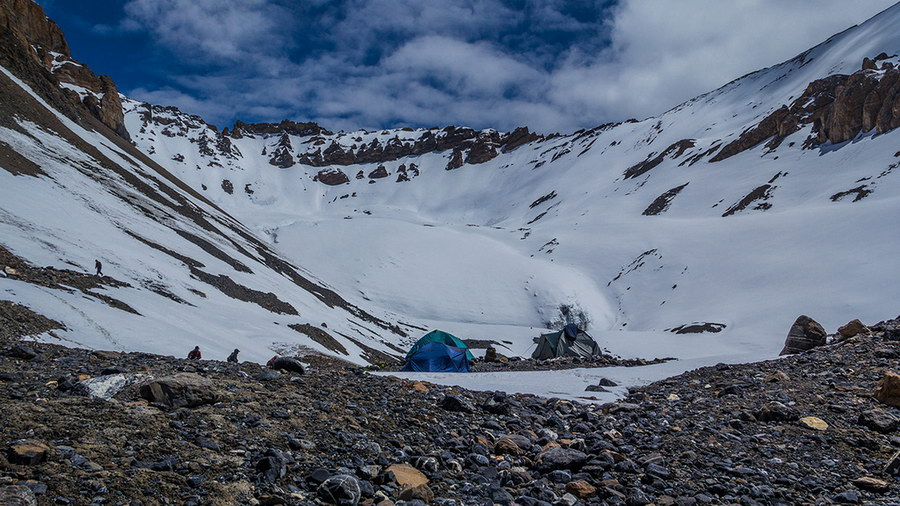
Shilla Col Base Camp (5400m)

Spiti, which literally means the 'middle land' , lies on the Indian border with Tibet across the main range of Himalaya, also known as the 'Transhimalaya'. Spiti is bounded on the east by Tibet, on the south by Kinnaur, on the west by Kullu & on the north by Ladakh.

The geological history of Spiti Valley dates back 500 million years with a remarkable plethora of Precambrian and Cambrian era fossils and a recent study by the Geological Society of America shows that Spiti contains various marine fossils. These Paleozoic Era fossils represent some of the earliest legged creatures, relatives of crabs and spiders. It is then not without reason that Spiti has come to be known as the fossil park of the Himalaya.

Two of the earliest known travellers to Spiti were Captain Alexander Gerard and Dr J. G. Gerard. They explored 'Bashair, Spiti and Kanwar' (Kinnaur) in 1817. The other visitors were H. Paidar and Ludwig Schmaderer in 1945. who escaped from Tibet. In July 1945 when still wandering aimlessly and not knowing that war was over. L. Schmaderer was brutally robbed and murdered at or near the little village of Tabo in Spiti. H. Paider returned to Poo on the Sutlej and followed the river down to Saharan where he gave himself up and made a full report to the police followed by the arrest of the murderers.

The first climber in the area was J. O. M. Roberts in 1939. He climbed Chau Chau Kang Nilda (Guan Nelda) 20,680 ft (H.J. Vol. XII, p. 129). Roberts also reconnoitered part of the Shilla nullah, intending to examine Shilla, supposedly climbed by a Survey of India khalasi in 1861. He climbed the peak marked 20,680 feet, but bad visibility prevented him from getting any view as he returned mentioning "The weather was bad and the mountains here rather uninspiring". Then he intended to ascend the Ratang nullah to examine the northern sides of peaks 21,760 and 21,350 feet, but there was too much water in the nullah at that's time of year to force a safe passage. J. de. V. Graaff and K. E. Snelson recceed peaks in 1952, while P. F. Holmes and T. H. Braham made a number of fine ascents in Ratang nala and of Chau Chau Kang Nilda (CCKN).

More recently Harish Kapadia led two expeditions to Spiti in 1983 & 87 which followed the Lingti river to its head and made ascents of Shilla, Parilungbi, Yangzi Diwan Pass among others.

== Ascent ==
The ascent of Shilla Col (5725 m; 18,783 ft) from South, was on 9 June 2015 by a team from Kolkata led by mountaineer Debasis Bardhan and included Pritam Deb Barman, Jyotirmoy Chakraborty & Ashish Chanda among the col summiters. The team took six days (along the Shilla Nullah) to establish base camp at 5400m, below Shilla Col. This was also the first known/documented Shilla Nullah/Nala Exploration till its head, in Spiti, Himachal Pradesh (May-Jun 2015)

The 2016 committee for Jagdish Nanavati Award for Excellence in Mountaineering, acknowledged and mentioned the report submitted by the expedition to Shilla Nala as, "a quality production, comprehensive, perfectly clear and with good historical content."
