= Ghuwaifat =

Ghuwaifat ٱلْغُوَيْفَات (in Arabic)
- Location of Ghuwaifat in the UAE
- Country: United Arab Emirates
- Emirate: Abu Dhabi
- Municipal region: Al Gharbia

Government
  - Type: Absolute monarchy
  - Emir: Mohammad bin Zayed Al Nahyan
  - Ruler's Representative of the Western Region of the Emirate of Abu Dhabi: Hamdan bin Zayed bin Sultan Al Nahyan
- Time zone: UTC+4 (UAE Standard Time)

Ghuwaifat (Arabic: ٱلْغُوَيْفَات) is a small town in the far west of the emirate of Abu Dhabi. The place forms a border crossing to Saudi Arabia on the transit road to Qatar.

Ghuwaifat belongs to the urban area of Sila, which extends in the west to the border with Saudi Arabia.

An x-ray facility that transilluminates a complete truck at once was installed there a few years ago. Abu Dhabi Airport Duty Free also opened a small shop in 2004. In 2007, 2,900,000 people crossed the border at Ghuwaifat.

== See also ==
- Madinat Zayed
