= Emirate of Abu Dhabi =

Constituent emirate of the United Arab Emirates

Emirate of Abu Dhabi إِمَارَة أَبُو ظَبِي Imārat Abū Ẓabī
- Emirate
- Flag Coat of arms

- Location of Abu Dhabi in the UAE
- Interactive map of Emirate of Abu Dhabi
- Coordinates: 23.5°N 54.5°E
- Country: United Arab Emirates
- Founded: Emirate of Dhafrah 1540, Emirate of Abu Dhabi 1793
- British protectorate: January 8, 1820
- Independence from the UK: December 1, 1971
- Joined the UAE: December 3, 1971
- Seat: Abu Dhabi
- Subdivisions: 3 Municipal Regions: Abu Dhabi (Central Region); Al-Ain (Eastern Region); Adh-Dhafrah (Western Region)

Government
  - Type: Islamic absolute monarchy within a federation
  - Ruler: Mohamed bin Zayed Al Nahyan
  - Crown Prince: Khaled bin Mohamed Al Nahyan

Area
  - Total: 67,340 km^{2} (26,000 sq mi)
  - Rank: 1st

Population (2024)
  - Total: 4,135,985
  - Rank: 2nd
  - Density: 61.42/km^{2} (159.1/sq mi)
- Demonym(s): Abu Dhabian, Dhabyani

GDP (nominal)
  - Total: US$ 308 billion(2024)
  - Per capita: US$ 84,900 (2023)
- Time zone: UTC+4 (UAE standard time)
- ISO 3166 code: AE-AZ

The Emirate of Abu Dhabi (Note: /ˌæbuː ˈdɑːbi/ US: /ˌɑːb-/; Arabic: إِمَارَة أَبُوظَبِي, romanized: Imārat Abū Ẓabī, pronounced [ʔabuː ˈðˤɑbi]) is one of seven emirates that constitute the United Arab Emirates. It is the largest emirate, accounting for 87% of the nation's total land area or 67,340 km^{2} (26,000 sq mi).

Abu Dhabi is also the second most populous of the seven emirates. In 2024, the emirate's population had grown to 4,135,985. The city of Abu Dhabi, after which the emirate is named, is the capital of both the emirate and the federation.

In the early 1970s, two important developments influenced the status of the Emirate of Abu Dhabi. The first was the establishment of the United Arab Emirates in December 1971, with Abu Dhabi as its initially temporary political and administrative capital. The second was the sharp increase in oil prices after the Yom Kippur War, which accompanied a change in the relationship between the oil-exporting countries in the Middle East and foreign oil companies, leading to a dramatic rise in oil revenues.

In 2024, Abu Dhabi had a nominal GDP of AED 1.132 trillion (US $308 billion), a nominal GDP per capita of US$84,900 (2023), and a government debt to GDP ratio of 16%. In 2022, the size of oil and mining trade increased by 54% and accounted for 48% of GDP. Construction was the next-largest contributor at 7.9%, followed by the financial sector at 6.1%.

== Etymology ==
Before the area got the name Abu Dhabi, it was known as Milh, which means salt in Arabic, probably because of the salt water in the area. Milh is still the name of one of the islands in Abu Dhabi.

Abu Dhabi means "father of the gazelle". The first use of the name goes back over 300 years. Since the origin of this name has been passed down from generation to generation through poems and legends, it is difficult to know its actual etymology. It is thought that the name came about because of the abundance of gazelles in the area and a popular folk tale about the founding of the city of Abu Dhabi involving Sheikh Shakhbut bin Dhiyab Al Nahyan.

== History ==
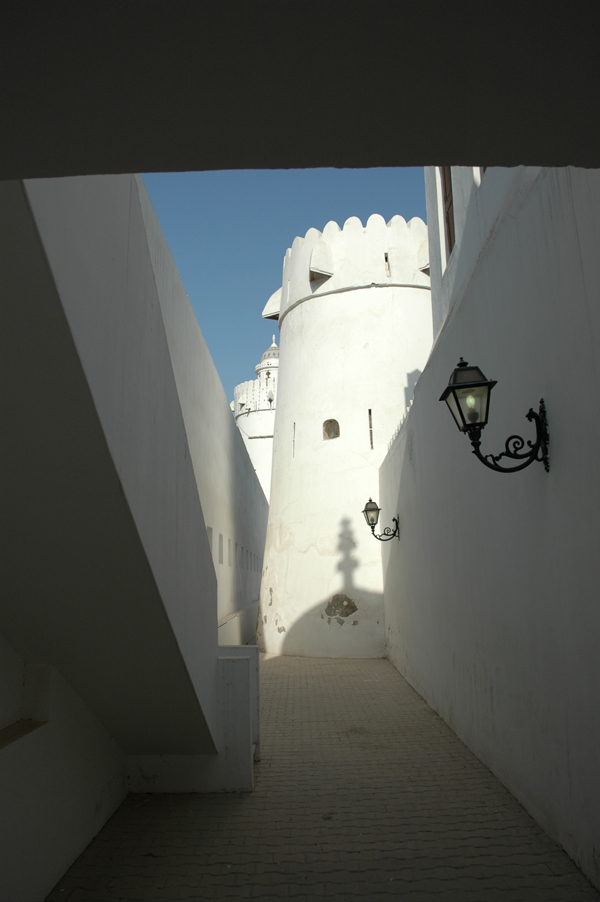
Al-Hosn Fort in Abu Dhabi, dating to the 18th century

Parts of Abu Dhabi were settled millennia ago, and its early history fits the nomadic herding and fishing pattern typical of the broader region. The Emirate shares the historical region of Al-Buraimi or Tawam (which includes modern-day Al Ain) with Oman, and is demonstrated to have been inhabited for over 7000 years.

Modern Abu Dhabi traces its origins to the rise of an important tribal confederation, the Bani Yas, in the late 14th century, which also assumed control of Dubai. In the late 18th century Abu Dhabi was formed. In the early 19th century, Dubai and Abu Dhabi branches parted ways.

The Emirate at its greatest extent stretched from Sohar, Oman to Al Hasa, Saudi Arabia, during the wars of the 3rd & 4th Destruction of Doha, when the Emirate declared war on the Ottoman Empire and Qatar over a dispute. Contrary to popular belief, the emirate and the other six emirates were not under Omani rule but independent and self-governing. The name Omani Coast refers to the emirate’s location within the historical and cultural region of Oman, not the Sultanate of Muscat & Oman.

The Emirate of Abu Dhabi was first established in 1540 after the fall of the Jabrids as the Emirate of Al Dhafrah. It was ruled by the Bani Yas, who are originally from the Bani Hilal tribe. Their rule in Al Dhafrah was cemented by the construction of the Al Dhafrah fort in 1543. Around 1761, the tribe discovered freshwater sources on Abu Dhabi Island, which led them to establish the Abu Dhabi Emirate.

From 1881 to 1893, the emirate, under Zayed bin Khalifa Al Nahyan, was embroiled in a fierce war with Qatar. This culminated in the Battle of Khannour near the village of Maza'a from January to February 1889, which extended to several regions within the emirate, including Liwa, Al Dhafra and Al Ain. The emirate also had several victories over Qatar. Abu Dhabi demolished the capital, Doha, twice and occupied the broader Al Hasa region after Ottoman intervention. In 1893, an agreement jointly brokered by the British and Ottomans resolved the long-standing conflict between Qatar and Abu Dhabi.

Abu Dhabi was a base for the tribe to trade, dive for pearls, and for other maritime activities. Into the late 19th century, Abu Dhabi's economy continued to flourish mainly by camel herding, production of dates and vegetables at the inland oases of Al-Ain and Liwa, and fishing and pearl diving off the coast of Abu Dhabi city, which was occupied mainly during the summer. Most dwellings in Abu Dhabi city were, at this time, constructed of palm fronds (barasti), with the wealthier families occupying mud huts. These businesses were very profitable and a strong source of income for the local Dhabyanis, until cultured pearls were invented in the early 19th century in Japan, causing the pearl trade to crash. This continued until the late 1950s, when oil was discovered in the emirate and its coastlines.

In 1939, Sheikh Shakhbut Bin-Sultan Al Nahyan granted petroleum concessions, and oil was first found in 1958. At first, oil money had a marginal contribution. A few low-rise concrete buildings were erected, and the first paved road was completed in 1961, but Shakbut, uncertain whether the new oil royalties would last, took a cautious approach, preferring to save the revenue rather than invest it in development.

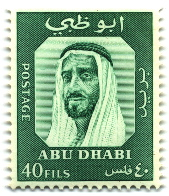
Sheikh Zayed bin Sultan Al Nahyan, the emir of Abu Dhabi and founder of the federation (stamp from 1967)

His brother, Sheikh Zayed bin Sultan Al Nahyan, saw that oil wealth had the potential to transform Abu Dhabi. The ruling Nahyan family decided that Sheikh Zayed should replace his brother as ruler and carry out his vision of developing the country. On August 6, 1966, with the assistance of the British, Zayed became the new ruler.

With the announcement by the UK in 1968 that it would withdraw from the area of the Persian Gulf by 1971, Zayed became the main driving force behind the formation of the UAE. After the Emirates gained independence in 1971, oil wealth continued to flow to the area, and traditional mud-brick huts were rapidly replaced with banks, boutiques and modern highrises.

== Geography ==
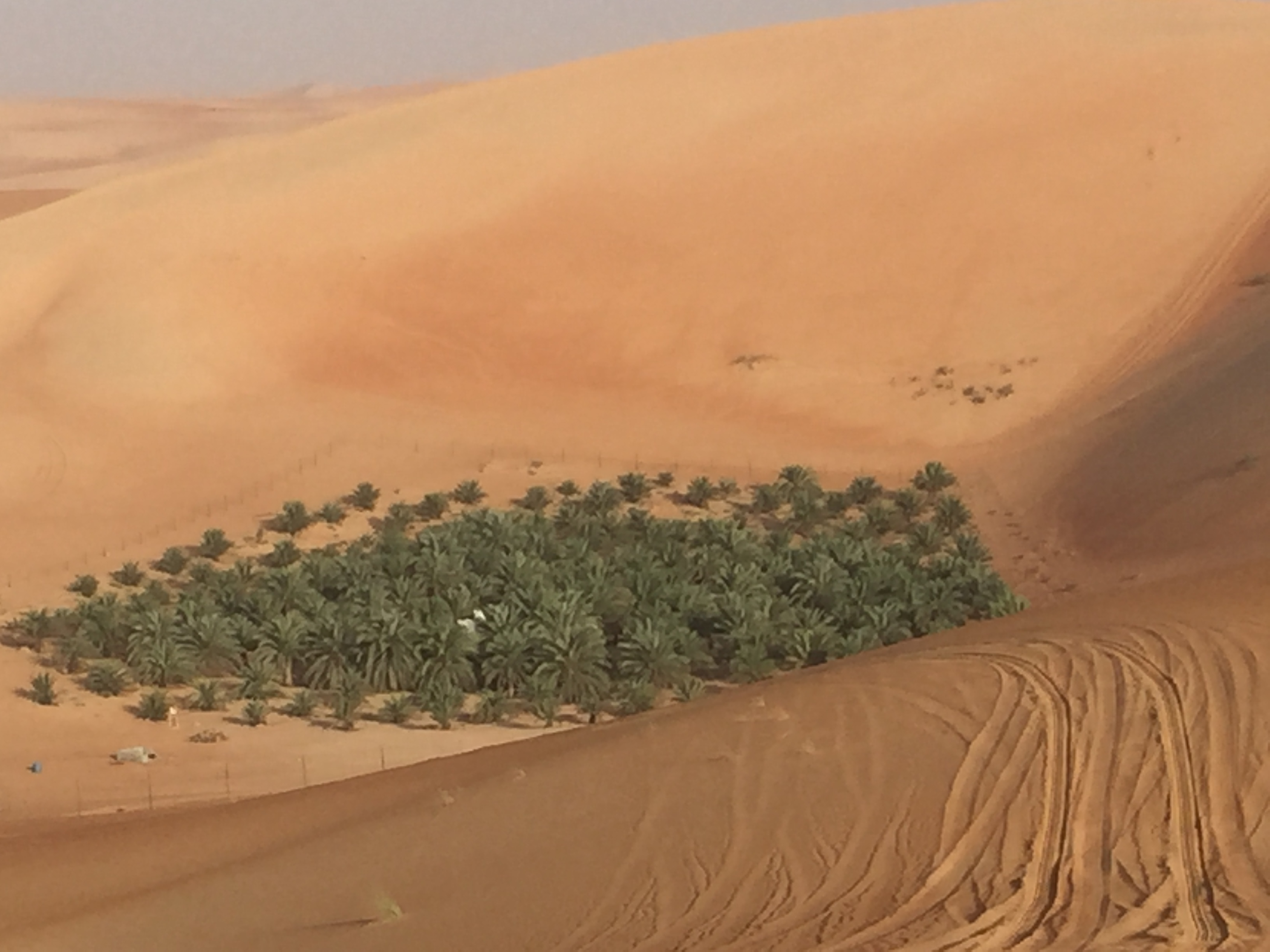
A date palm grove in the desert north of Liwa Oasis in the Western Region, roughly in the area of Ar-Rub' Al-Khali (The Empty Quarter), which covers much of the emirate

The United Arab Emirates is in the oil-rich and strategic Arabian or Persian Gulf region. It adjoins the Kingdom of Saudi Arabia and the Sultanate of Oman.

Abu Dhabi is in the far west and southwest part of the United Arab Emirates along the southern coast of the Persian Gulf between latitudes 22°40' and around 25° north and longitudes 51° and around 56° east. It borders the emirate of Dubai and emirate of Sharjah to its north.

The Emirate has an area of 67,340 square kilometres (26,000 square miles), occupying about 87% of the UAE, excluding islands. Its territorial waters embrace about 200 islands off its 700 km (430 miles) coastline. Its topography is dominated by low-lying sandy terrain dotted with sand dunes exceeding 300 m (980 ft) in height in some areas. The eastern part of the Emirate borders the western fringes of the Hajar Mountains. Hafeet Mountain, Abu Dhabi's highest elevation and sole mountain, rising 1,100–1,400 m (3,600–4,600 ft), is south of Al-Ain City.

Land cultivation and irrigation for agriculture and forestation over the past decade has increased the size of "green" areas in the emirate to about 5% of the total land area, including parks and roadside plantations. About 1.2% of the total land area is used for agriculture. A small part of the land area is covered by mountains, containing several caves. The coastal area contains pockets of wetland and mangrove colonies. Abu Dhabi also has dozens of islands, mostly small and uninhabited, some of which have been designated as sanctuaries for wildlife.

=== Climate ===
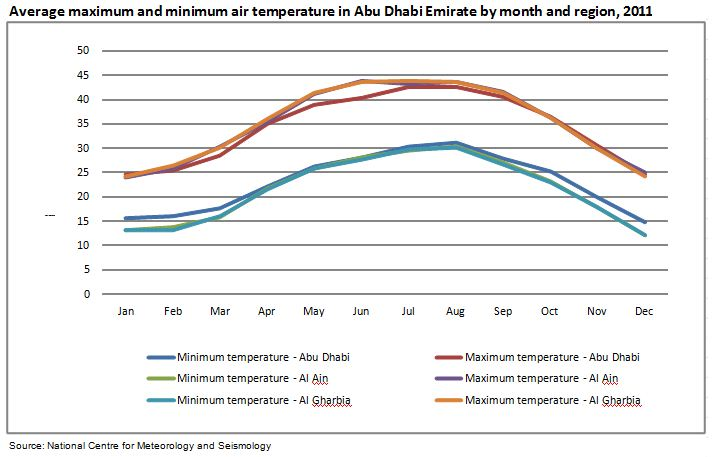
Average temperatures in Abu Dhabi emirate

The emirate is in the tropical dry region. The Tropic of Cancer runs through its southern part, giving its climate an arid nature characterised by high temperatures throughout the year, with a very hot summer. The Emirate's high summer (June to August) temperatures are associated with high relative humidity, especially in coastal areas. Abu Dhabi has warm winters with occasionally low temperatures. The air temperatures show variations between the coastal strip, the desert interior and areas of higher elevation, which together make up the topography of the Emirate.

Abu Dhabi receives scant rainfall but totals vary greatly from year to year. Seasonal northerly winds blow across the country, helping to ameliorate the weather when they are not laden with dust, in addition to the brief moisture-laden southeasterly winds. The winds often vary between southerly, southeasterly, westerly, northerly and northwesterly. Another characteristic of the Emirate's weather is the high rate of evaporation of water due to high temperature, wind speed, and low rainfall.

The oasis city of Al Ain, about 150 km (93 mi) away, bordering Oman, regularly records the highest summer temperatures in the country, but its dry desert air and cooler evenings make it a traditional retreat from the intense summer heat and year-round humidity of the capital city.

== Government ==
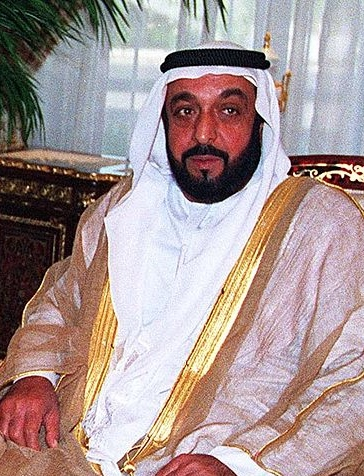
Sheikh Khalifa bin Zayed Al Nahyan, emir of Abu Dhabi from 2004 to 2022.

The emirate's political form is an absolutist, hereditary monarchy. The current ruler of the emirate is Sheikh Mohamed bin Zayed Al Nahyan, who began his reign on May 14, 2022, upon the death of his brother Sheikh Khalifa. The ruler of Abu Dhabi is traditionally also elected as the president of the UAE by the Federal Supreme Council, a custom that began with the UAE's first president, Sheikh Zayed bin Sultan Al Nahyan. Qasr al-Hosn was the palace-fort residence of the ruler and the emirate's seat of government from ca. 1760/1790 to 1966, and later became a museum.

The current crown prince of Abu Dhabi is Sheikh Khalid , a son of the current ruler; the crown prince is assisted in his duties by the Crown Prince's Court, or Diwan. The crown prince traditionally heads the Abu Dhabi Executive Council, which acts as the government of the emirate. The Executive Council includes the chairpersons of Abu Dhabi government departments, who often also head Abu Dhabi state-owned companies and sovereign wealth funds. Abu Dhabi Police is the emirate's primary law enforcement agency and has its own judicial system that is independent from the federal judiciary.

Although no elected parliament exists, the traditional majlis is a form of popular consultation and political participation. The open assembly is held by the emir and members of the royal family, and any citizen may come and raise an issue of private or public interest.

Each municipality has a local government under the umbrella of the Department of Municipal Affairs, which divides the emirate into three districts; the Abu Dhabi Capital District Municipality, the Western Region Municipality, and the Eastern Region Municipality. Although the emirate is diversifying its economy, oil is the primary source of government funding. Excess reserves are managed by the Abu Dhabi Investment Authority, Mubadala and the Abu Dhabi Holding Company, which invest to diversify the domestic economy and in markets abroad.

== Demographics ==
Historical population
Year	Pop.	±% p.a.
1980	451,848	—
1985	566,036	+4.61%
1995	942,463	+5.23%
2005	1,399,484	+4.03%
2010	1,967,659	+7.05%
2015	2,784,490	+7.19%
2024	4,135,985	+4.49%
Source: Citypopulation Abu Dhabi Census

The extraordinary increase in population in the Emirate of Abu Dhabi during the past half-century has made the population's size, structure, and distribution a key concern for future development.

The population of Abu Dhabi reached 4,135,985 million in 2024 The total population has increased 99 times in 50 years. The number of citizens increased 39 times and non-citizens 173 times from 1960 to 2010. The most important reason for the increase in the population of citizens is the increase in naturalization (before 1971, and later from other UAE emirates), while immigration constitutes the main factor in increasing the population overall.

The resident population of the Abu Dhabi Emirate exceeded 2 million people in 2011. In mid-year 2011 the estimated population in Abu Dhabi Region was 1.31 million (61.8%), Al Ain Region 0.58 million (27.6%), and Al Gharbia 0.23 million (10.6%), making the total mid-year population of the Abu Dhabi Emirate 2.12 million.

In Abu Dhabi, fertility is higher than in most developed regions of the world, and mortality is extremely low. In 2011, Crude Birth Rates and Crude Death Rates among citizens were 15.1 births per 1,000 people and 1.4 deaths per 1,000 people, respectively.

Selected demographic indicators
Indicator	2010	2011	2012	2013	2014	2015	2016	Units
Total population (mid-year estimate)	1,967,700	2,120,700	2,334,600	2,453,100	2,656,450	2,784,490	2,908,200	persons
Males	1,379,600	1,499,800	1,662,100	1,747,800	1,766,140	1,831,740	1,858,200	persons
Females	558,100	620,900	672,500	705,300	890,310	952,750	1,050,600	persons
Age dependency ratio	28	22.4	21.8	21.6	21.6	21.4	21.3	
Age dependency ratio, old	1.0	1.1	1.1	1.1	1.1	1.2	1.1	
Age dependency ratio, young	27	21.3	20.7	20.4	20.5	20.2	20.1	
Urban population	1,289,247	1,292,800	1,296,500	1,342,600	1,618,440	1,698,960	1,785,460	persons
Rural population	678,412	827,900	1,038,100	1,110,500	1,039,010	1,085,530	1,112,740	persons
Percentage of the population residing in rural areas	34.5	39	44.5	45.4	39.1	39	38.3	
Average annual population growth rate	7.7	7.7	10	5.1	8.3	4.8	4.4	
General fertility rate	80.2	80.3	78.8	78.7	62.7	58.9	53.8	births per 1000 women (aged 15 – 49 years)
Crude birth rate	14.9	15.1	14.6	14.7	14.3	13.9	13.7	per 1000 population
Crude death rate	1.5	1.4	1.3	1.2	1.2	1.1	1.1	per 1000 population
Infant mortality rate	8	6.3	6.4	6.3	7.7	7.2	7	per 1000 live births
Under 5 mortality rate	10	8.5	8.2	8.2	9.7	9.1	8.8	per 1000 live births
Life expectancy at birth for males	74.9	69	75.2	75.2	75.2	76	75.9	years
Life expectancy at birth for females	77	70	78.7	78.7	78.7	79.8	79.5	years
Singulate median age at first marriage for males	26.6	26.7	27.9	26.3	28.1	28.4	28.7	years
Singulate median age at first marriage for females	25.5	25.7	26.8	23.2	25.1	25.2	25.6	years

Largest cities or towns in Abu Dhabi 2023 Calculation
Rank		Regions	Pop.
1	Abu Dhabi	Central	1,807,000
2	Al Ain	East	846,747
3	Madinat Zayed	West	46,862
4	Ruwais	West	38,740
5	Ghayathi	West	34,333
6	Liwa	West	20,192
7	Al Mirfa	West	9,111
8	Sila	West	7,900
9	Sweihan	East	5,403
10	Dalma	West	5,000

== Economy ==
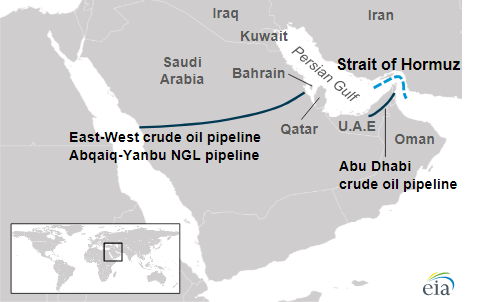
Abu Dhabi Crude Oil Pipeline (ADCOP)

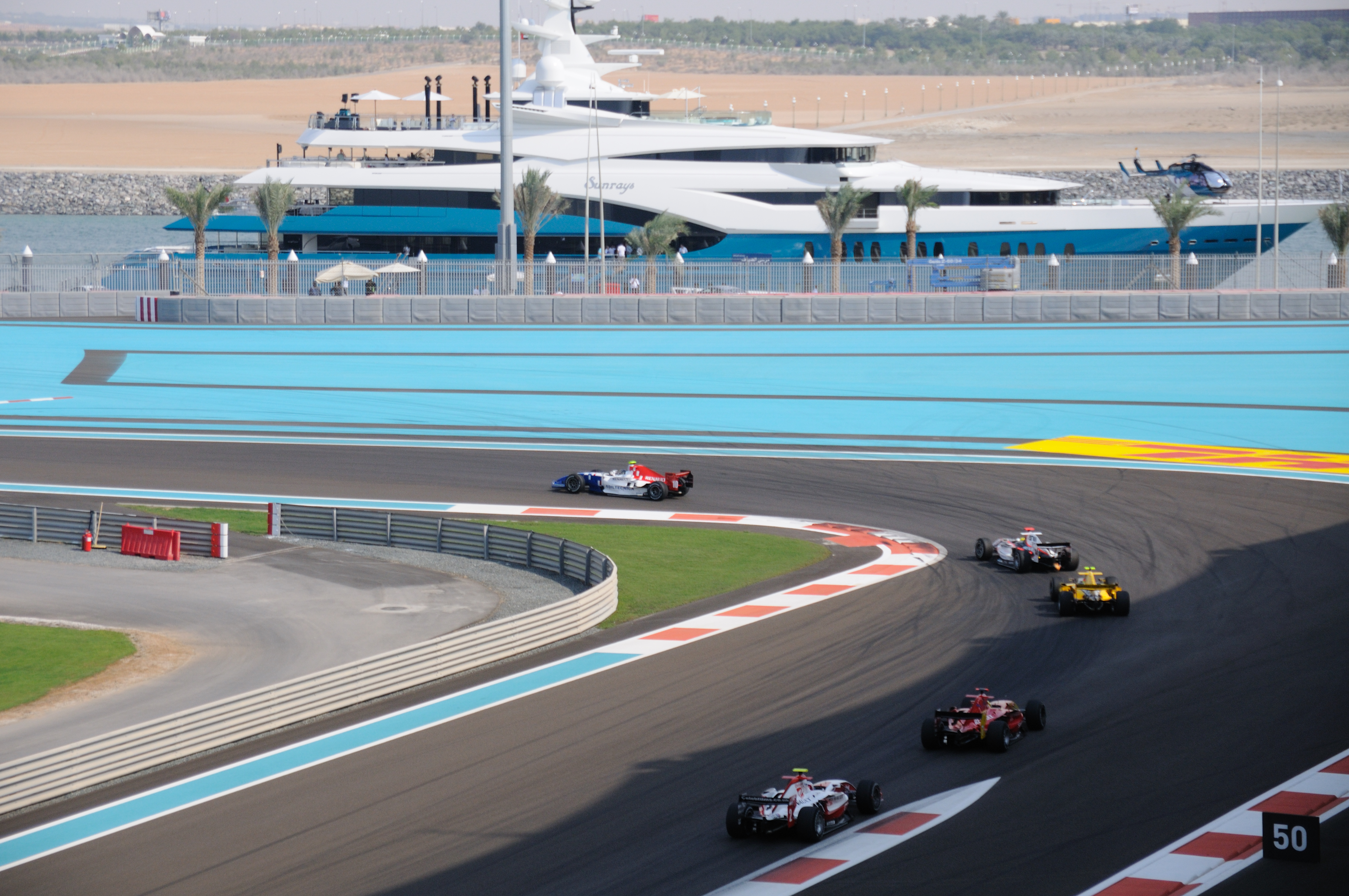
2011 Final Abu Dhabi Grand Prix

According to the Statistics Centre – Abu Dhabi (SCAD), the gross domestic product (GDP) of the Emirate of Abu Dhabi in 2024 reached AED 1.2 trillion (real GDP), marking 3.8 percent real growth over 2023. Nominal GDP was recorded at AED 1.133 trillion (approximately US $308 billion). The non-oil sector grew by 6.2 percent year-on-year and accounts for over 53 percent of the emirate’s total GDP.

The total fixed capital formation was AED 199,001 million in 2011, while the compensation of employees amounted to AED 124,960 million in the same year. The main activities contributing to economic growth (GDP at constant prices) in 2011 were "Mining and quarrying" (including crude oil and natural gas), "Financial and insurance" and "Manufacturing" with increases of 9.4 per cent, 10.5 per cent and 9.8 per cent respectively. Commodity imports through the ports of the Emirate of Abu Dhabi were valued at AED 116.4 billion in 2011 compared with AED 86.6 billion in 2010. The main imports during 2011 were machinery and base metals, which accounted for 50.7 per cent of the total value of imports. The United States of America was the main country for imports, from which the Emirate received imports worth AED 13.4 billion. Non-oil exports were valued at AED 11.5 billion, with transport equipment and base metals contributing 61.5 per cent of the total. Canada was the top destination of Abu Dhabi non-oil exports, receiving goods worth AED 2.6 billion from the Emirate in 2011. Mina' Zayid is the main port of Abu Dhabi through which the goods flow.

Al-Ain has one of the few remaining traditional camels souqs in the country, near an IKEA store.

Foreign Trade Statistics through the ports of the Emirate of Abu Dhabi (Million AED)
Item	2005	2009	2010	2011
Total trade	226,339.5	308,699.4	387,275.7*	532,858.0*
Total exports	191,125.2	214,827.2	300,702.1*	416,484.0*
Oil, gas and oil products	184,711.7	196,632.2	278,105.4*	393,439.0*
Non-oil exports	3,186.4	9,500.8	11,610.8	11,478.0
Re-exports	3,227.1	8,694.2	10,985.9	11,567.0
Imports	35,214.3	93,872.2	86,573.7	116,374.0
Net trade in goods	155,910.9	120,955.0	214,128.4*	300,110.0*
* _{Preliminary estimates}				

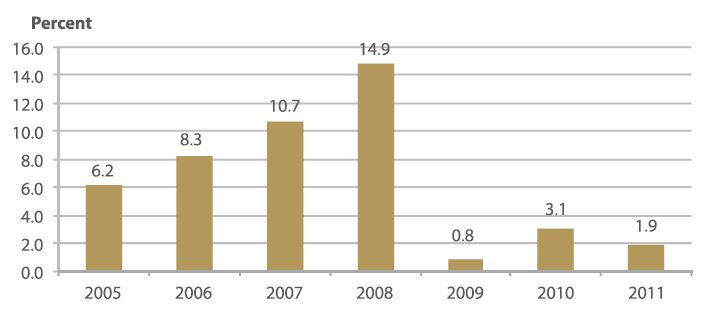
Inflation rates for Abu Dhabi

The Emirate exported 747.2 million barrels of crude oil in 2010. Japan, the top importer, received around 35.6% of the Emirate's total crude oil exports. In 2011, the Emirate exported 10.0 million metric tons of refined petroleum products, of which the Netherlands bought 16.9%, followed by Japan, which purchased 13.9%. One of the main oil pipelines is the Habshan–Fujairah oil pipeline. The Emirate's LNG exports increased by AED 2,973.0 million in 2011 compared with 2010, reaching AED 17,128.2 million. Japan topped the list of importers by 98.4% of the LNG exports value, followed by India by 1.0% in 2011. The Emirate imported 828,093.9 million cubic feet of natural gas in 2011, at a daily average of 2,268.8 million cubic feet.

The inflation rate in 2011 was 1.9%. This was a result of an increase in the CPI from 119.3 points in 2010 to 121.6 points in 2011.

The First Abu Dhabi Bank (FAB) is the largest lender bank in the emirate and the second-largest lender in the federation. FAB has the largest market capitalization among UAE banks. The government has put in efforts to diversify the economy and invest in other areas such as the service and tourism industry. The capital city has seen various construction projects and the opening of shopping malls. The opening of the Emirates Palace marked the opening of the most expensive hotel ever built. The annual Abu Dhabi Grand Prix is a Formula One motor race held in the capital city, which further attracts tourists. Apart from the capital city, the Abu Dhabi Desert Challenge is held in the countryside and the tourism board is trying to highlight other places in the emirate.

The Emirate encourages major international film productions, which boost employment and the economy in general. A 2019 report stated that the Film Commission provides "30% cashback on production and post-production spend in the Emirate". As a result, film production teams have shot many scenes in Abu Dhabi and in nearby areas, including Mission: Impossible – Fallout, War Machine, and in 2018, 6 Underground. For the filming of the latter, the UAE military worked with the crew, providing soldiers as extras as well as aircraft that appear in the film. Production designer Jeffrey Beecroft said, "I’ve shot a lot of military stuff with Michael, but I never had the ability to have six Apache [helicopters], 10 Black Hawks and soldiers".

== Sub-divisions and settlements ==
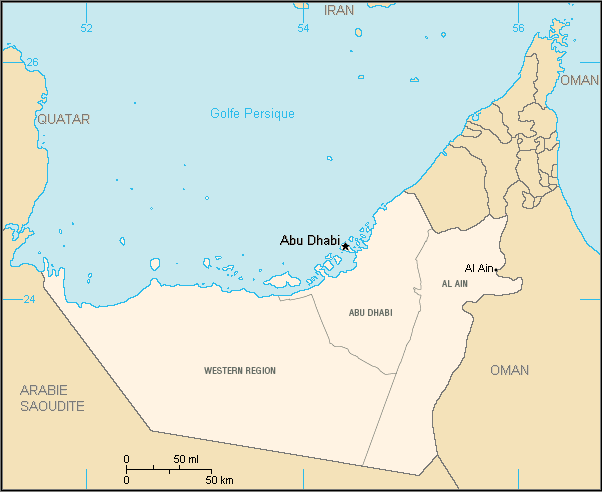
From left to right, the Western, Central and Eastern Regions of the Emirate of Abu Dhabi

The Emirate is divided into three municipal regions. The capital city Abu Dhabi has seen new construction of modern high rises, tall office and apartment buildings, and busy shops. Other urban centres in the emirate are Al-Ain, Baniyas, Ruwais, and Madinat Zayed. Al-Ain is an agglomeration of several villages scattered around a desert oasis; today it is the site of the national university, UAEU. In addition, Al-Ain is billed as the "Garden City" of the UAE.

Region	Map	Settlements
Abu Dhabi Central Capital District; Abu Dhabi Metropolitan Area; Abu Dhabi Region		Abu Dhabi City (main settlement); Abu al Abyad; Al-Aryam Island; Al-Bahiyah; Al-Shahamah; Al-Wathbah; Bani Yas City; Ghantoot; Halat al Bahrani; Jubail Island; Khalifa Port; Masdar City; Mina' Zayed; Mussafah; Saadiyat Island; Yas Island; Reem Island; Al Maryah Island; Al Tawelah; Al Shalelah; Al Shamkha; Al Mu'azaz
Al Dhafra Region; Western (Gharbiyyah) Region		Madinat Zayed (main settlement); Ghayathi; Ghuwaifat; Habshan; Liwa Oasis; Marawah Island; Ruwais; Sila; Sir Bani Yas; Tarif
Al-Ain Region; Eastern (Sharqiyyah) Region		Al Ain City (main settlement); Al-Faqa' (partly in the Emirate of Dubai); Al-Hayer; Al-Qu'a; Al-Shwaib; Al-Wagan; Al-Yahar; Mezyad; Nahil; Al Ajban; Remah; Sa'ah; Sweihan

== Transport ==
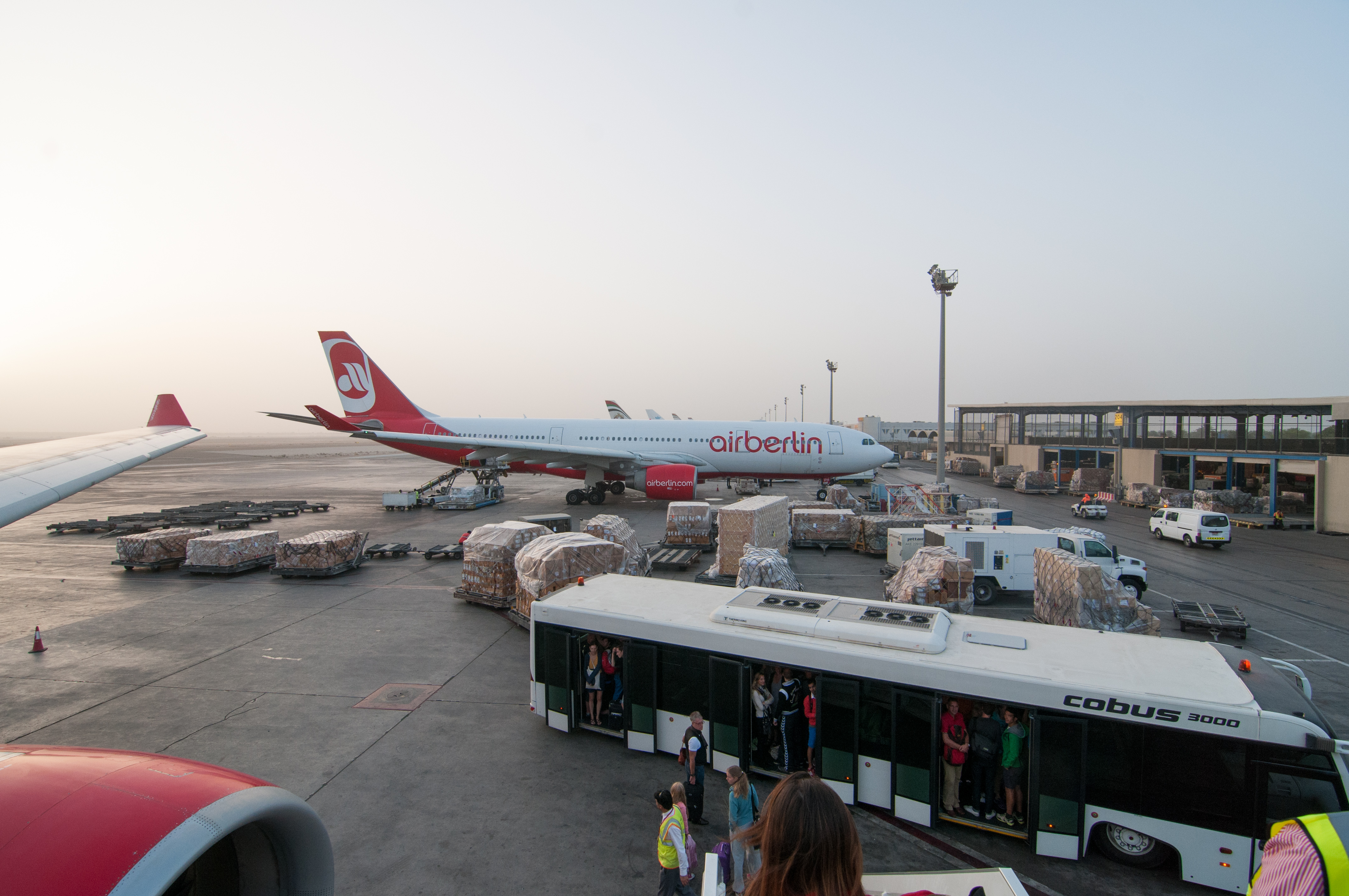
Sunrise at Zayed International Airport

Zayed International Airport (AUH) and Al Ain International Airport (AAN) serve the emirate. The older AUH airport was at Al Bateen Airport. The local time is GMT + 4 hours. Private vehicles, rideshares and taxis are the primary means of transportation in the city, although public buses run by the Abu Dhabi Municipality are available, mostly used by the lower-income population. There are bus routes to nearby towns such as Baniyas, Habashan, and Al-Ain, among others. A service started in 2005 between Abu Dhabi and the commercial city of Dubai (about 150 km (93 miles) away). The government is planning to build a railway in Abu Dhabi.

== Education ==
All private and public schools in the emirate come under the authority of the Abu Dhabi Education Council, while other emirates continue to work under the Federal Ministry of Education.

Schools and universities in Abu Dhabi:

- AAESS
- Sheikh Khalifa Bin Zayed Arab Pakistani School (Kindergarten through 12th-grade FSC)
- Pakistan Community Welfare School
- Abu Dhabi Indian School
- Abu Dhabi Indian School Branch 1, Al Wathba
- Abu Dhabi International School
- Abu Dhabi Men's College (a campus of The Higher Colleges of Technology)
- Abu Dhabi University
- Abu Dhabi Women's College (a campus of The Higher Colleges of Technology)
- Al Bateen Secondary School (British Curriculum)
- The American Community School of Abu Dhabi
- The American International School in Abu Dhabi
- Bright Kids Nursery, Muroor Street
- Emirates College for Advanced Education (ECAE)
- Emirates Future International Academy
- INSEAD Centre in Abu Dhabi
- International School of Choueifat, Abu Dhabi
- Islamia English School (Kindergarten through 12th-grade FSC, IGCSE: O Levels and A Levels also offered)
- Jarn Yafoor Middle School
- Khalifa University of Science, Technology and Research (KUSTAR)
- Masdar Institute of Science and Technology (research-oriented graduate-level university)
- Merryland International, Musaffah
- Mohamed bin Zayed University of Artificial Intelligence (MBZUAI)
- New York Institute of Technology
- New York University Abu Dhabi
- Paris-Sorbonne University Abu Dhabi
- Shaikh Khalifa Bin Zayed Bangladesh Islamia School
- Sherwood Academy CBSE
- Sherwood Academy IGCSC
- The British School
- The Petroleum Institute
- Zayed University
- Abu Dhabi Grammar School (Canada)
- Al Mushrif
- Al Nahda National Schools (Boys' and Girls' school O Levels, A-Levels, American High school system)
- Al Yasmina School
- Al-Noor Indian Islamic School
- Al Manhal International Private School
- Al Ma'ali International School
- Ashbal Al Quds Private School
- Emirates National School
- First Steps School Nursery
- GEMS American Academy
- Global Indian International School
- Indian Islahi Islamic School
- International Community School
- Khawarizmi International College
- Our Own English High School
- St.Joseph's School
- Strathclyde Business School (MSc/MBA)
- The British School – Al Khubairat
- The Cambridge High School
- The Elite Private School
- The Glenelg School of Abu Dhabi
- The Philippine School, Abu Dhabi

== See also ==
- Mussafah Bridge
- Mussafah Port
- Postage stamps of Abu Dhabi
- Water supply and sanitation in Abu Dhabi
- Wildlife of the United Arab Emirates
