= Sila, Abu Dhabi =

Sila ٱلـسِّـلَـع (in Arabic)
- City
- Location of Sila in the UAE
- Country: United Arab Emirates
- Emirate: Abu Dhabi
- Municipal region: Al Dhafra

Government
  - Sheikh: Mohamed bin Zayed Al Nahyan
  - Ruler's Representative of Al Dhafra: Hamdan bin Zayed Al Nahyan

Population
  - Total: 7,900
- Time zone: UTC+4 (UAE Standard Time)

As-Silaʿ (Arabic: ٱلـسِّـلَـع) is a city in the Al Dhafra region of the Emirate of Abu Dhabi, United Arab Emirates. It is 350 kilometres (220 miles) west of Abu Dhabi and 450 kilometres (280 miles) west of Dubai.

== Description ==
The area of Sila stretches west to the border with Saudi Arabia and encompasses the border town of Ghuwaifat and measures 408 square kilometres (158 square miles). The census of 2005 recorded a population of 11,900 in Sila.

== Archaeology ==
There are archaeological remains over a 7,000-year old settlement at Sila.
