= Abu Dhabi Central Capital District =

Abu Dhabi Central Capital District Minṭaqat Abū Ẓabī (مِنْطَقَة أَبُو ظَبِي) Abu Dhabi Metropolitan Area Central Region
- Abu Dhabi Region
- Flag Coat of arms

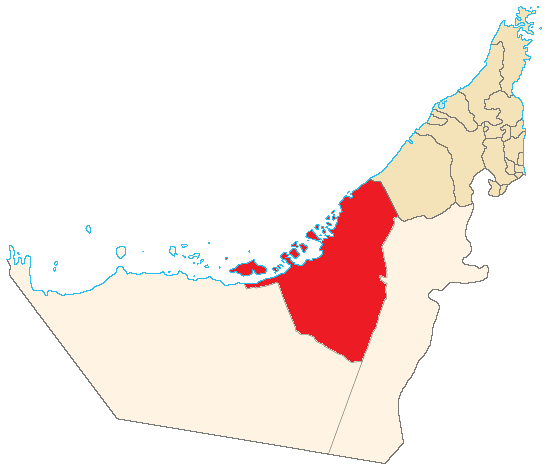
- Location of the Central Region in the Emirate of Abu Dhabi
- Coordinates: 24°28′N 54°22′E
- Country: United Arab Emirates
- Emirate: Abu Dhabi
- Seat: Abu Dhabi

Government
  - Type: Absolute monarchy
  - Emir: Mohammed bin Zayed Al Nahyan
  - Crown Prince: Khaled bin Mohamed Al Nahyan
  - General Manager of City Municipality: Saif Badr Al Qubaisi

Population (2024)
  - Total: 2,823,340
- Time zone: UTC+4 (UAE standard time)
  - Summer (DST): UTC+4

Abu Dhabi Central Capital District, officially Abu Dhabi Region (Arabic: مِنْطَقَة أَبُو ظَبِي, romanized: Minṭaqat Abū Ẓabī), also known as Abu Dhabi Metropolitan Area, is the municipal region in the Emirate of Abu Dhabi that contains the city of Abu Dhabi, distinct from the Eastern and Western municipal regions of the Emirate. Abu Dhabi City is the capital of both the Emirate and the United Arab Emirates, and has its own local government.

== Geography and description ==
Besides the city and island of Abu Dhabi, the region contains nearby settlements such as Al-Bahiyah, Mussafah, Khalifa City and Mohammed Bin Zayed City, and nearby islands such as Al-Aryam and Al-Saadiyat. Khalifa City is in the vicinity of Zayed International Airport, and Mafraq and Mussafah are industrial areas, with the latter having a sea port. As such, the region is economically important. Settlements:

- Abu Dhabi City (main settlement)
- Abu al Abyad
- Al-Aryam Island
- Al Bandar
- Al-Bahiyah
- Al Falah
- Al Lulu Island
- Al Maryah Island
- Al Rahah
- Al Rahbah
- Al Reem Island
- Al Samhah
- Al-Shahamah
- Al-Wathbah
- Al Shamkha
- Bani Yas City
- Ghantoot
- Halat al Bahrani
- Jubail Island
- Khalifa Industrial Zone
- Khalifa Port
- Masdar City
- Mina' Zayed
- Mussafah
- Saadiyat Island
- Yas Island
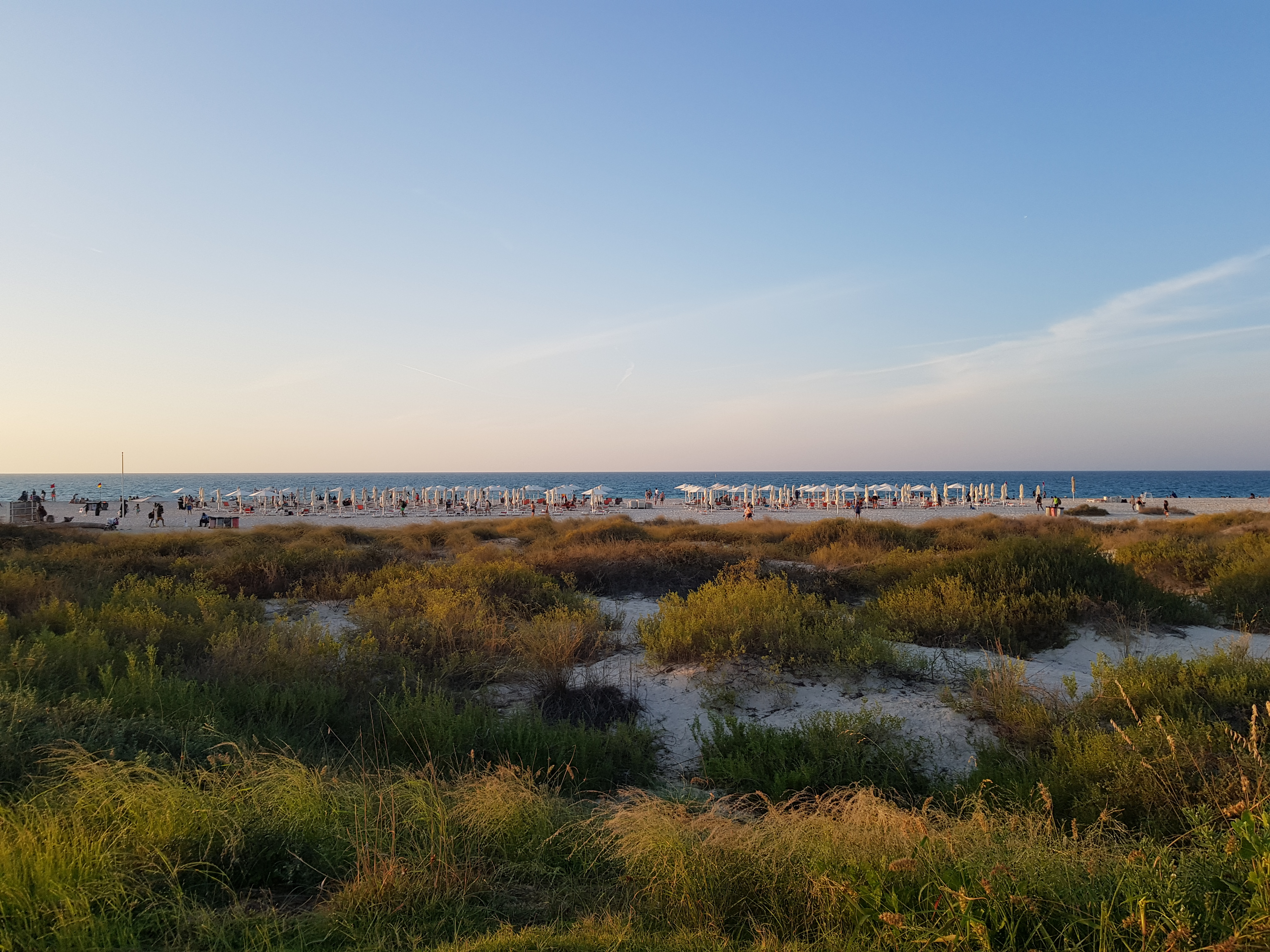
Saadiyat Beach

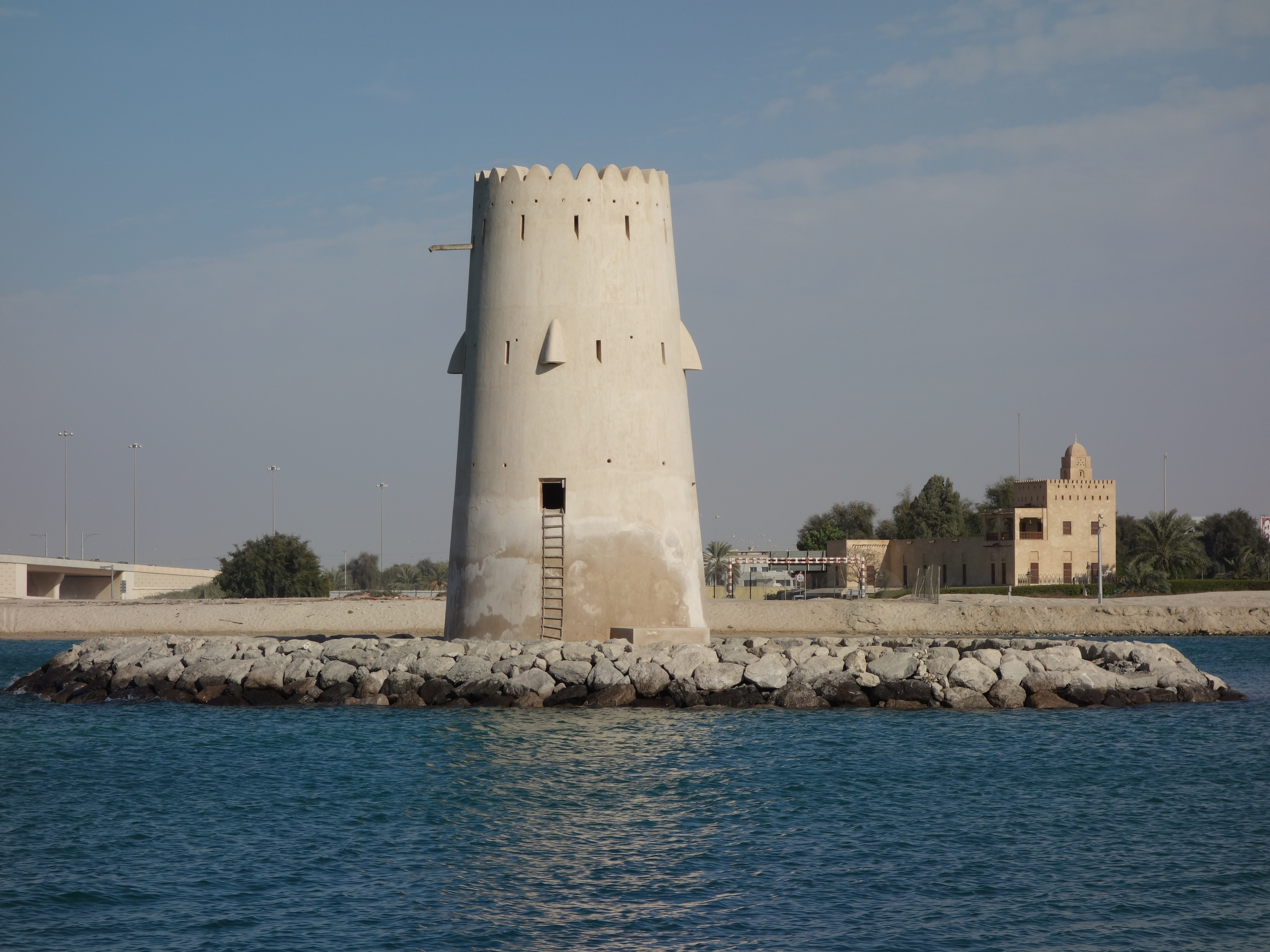
Al-Maqta' Tower (Arabic: بُرْج ٱلْمَقْطَع, romanized: Burj Al-Maqṭaʿ; front) and Al-Maqta' Fort (Arabic: حُصْن ٱلْمَقْطَع, romanized: Ḥuṣn Al-Maqṭaʿ; back), just outside the island of Abu Dhabi

=== Ecology ===
To the east of the island of Abu Dhabi is a national park with grey mangroves. Arabic for "the Mangrove" is al-Qurm (ٱلْقُرْم), and it is the name of a corniche that is popular amongst residents of the city, near Salam Street.

The satellite town of al-Wathba has a Ramsar wetland nearby.

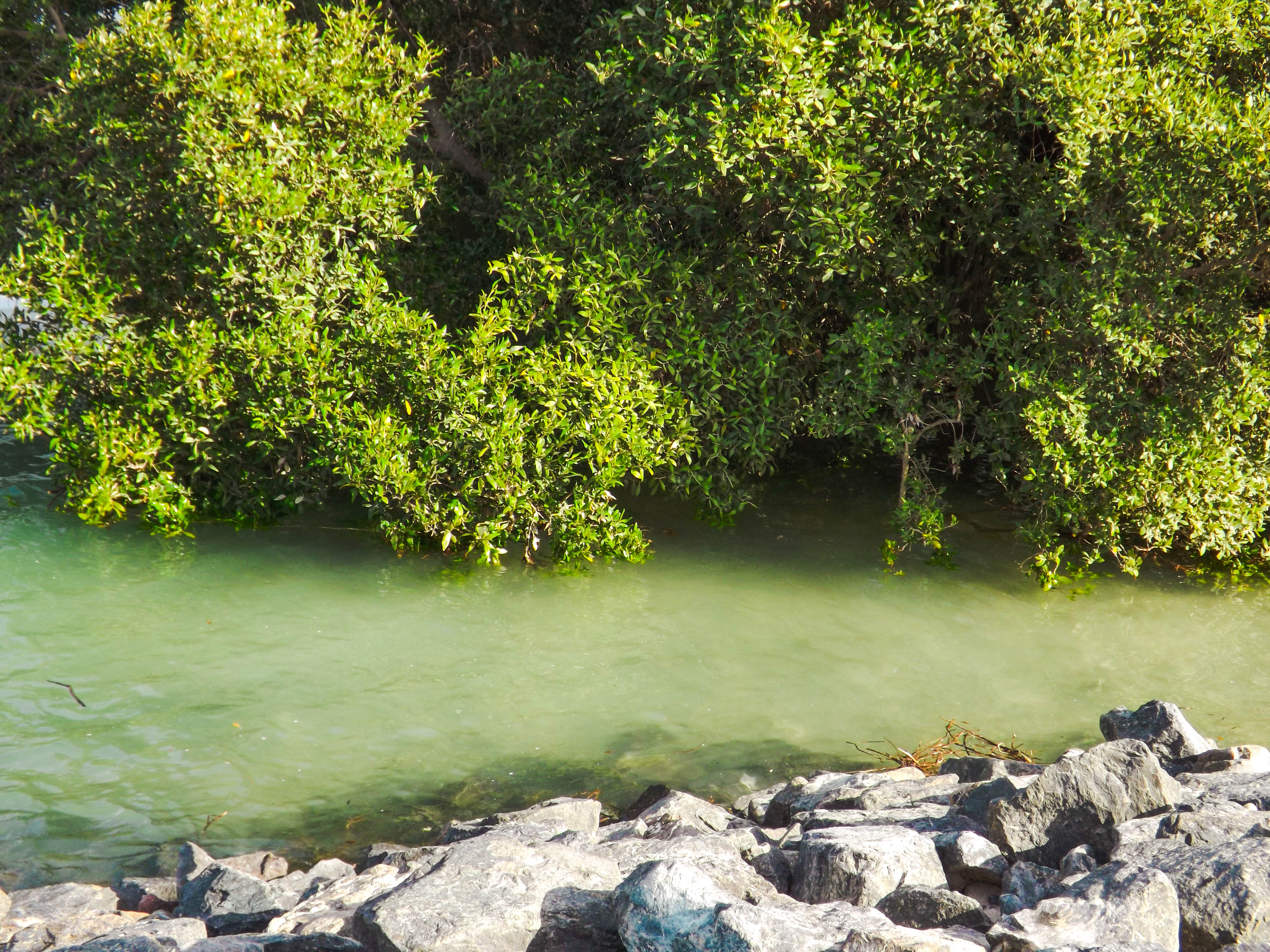
Grey mangroves in Mangrove National Park, to the east of Abu Dhabi

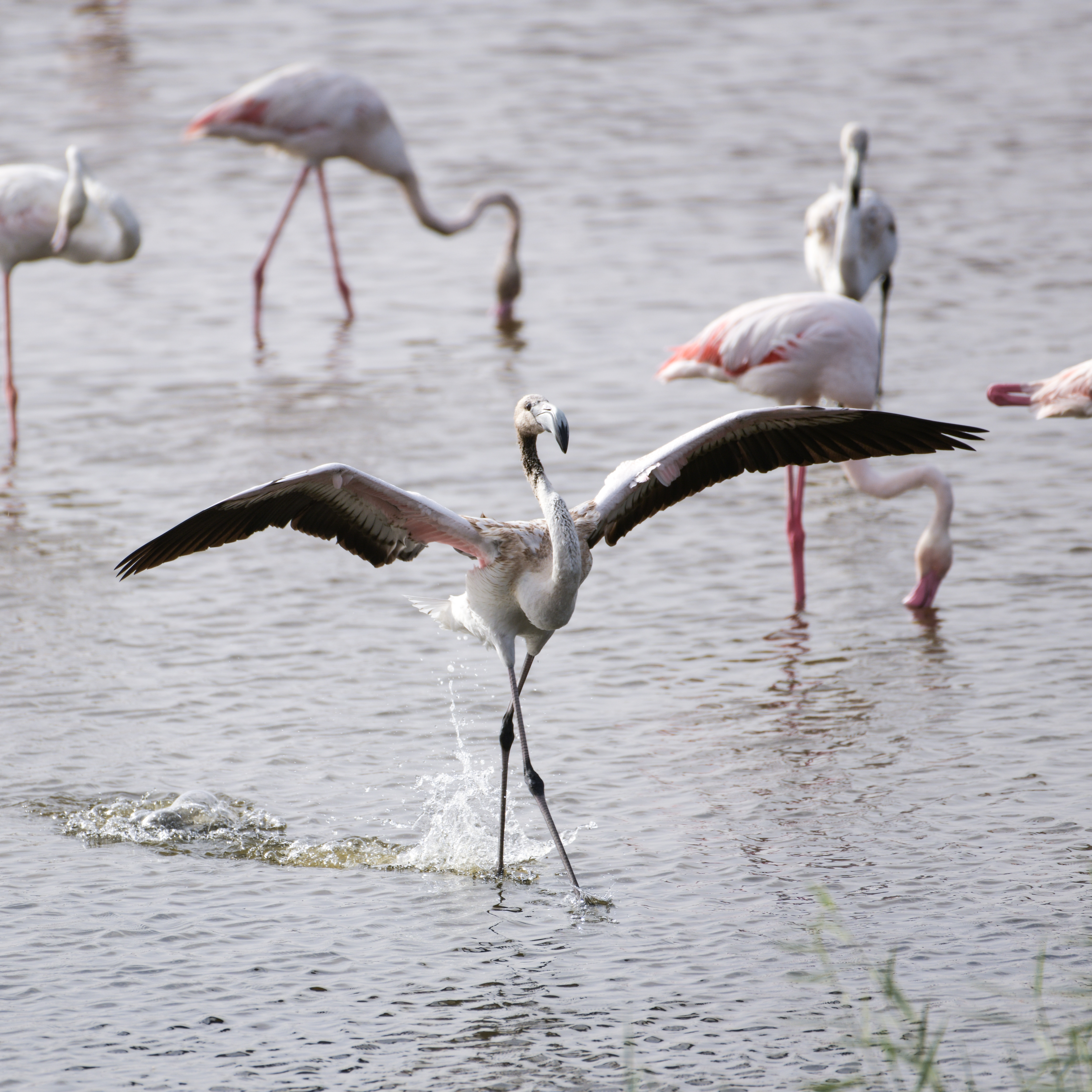
Greater flamingoes at Al-Wathba Wetland Reserve

=== Transportation ===
Abu Dhabi island has four highways and four road bridges which all connect the island to the mainland namely Sheikh Zayed road (E10) with Sheikh Zayed Bridge, Abu Dhabi-Al Ain road (E22) with Maqta Bridge, Abu Dhabi-Sweihan highway (E20) with Mussafah Bridge and The Abu Dhabi-Al Falah highway (E12) with Sheikh Khalifa Bridge. The Sheikh Zayed Bin Sultan Street, also known as Salam Street, is one of the busiest streets in Abu Dhabi Island, and goes near the mangroves located to the east of the island. It connects Abu Dhabi with the mainland through the Sheikh Zayed Bridge. The Abu Dhabi-Al Falah highway (E12) connects Abu Dhabi island to Saadiyat Island, Yas Island and other islands and to the mainland.

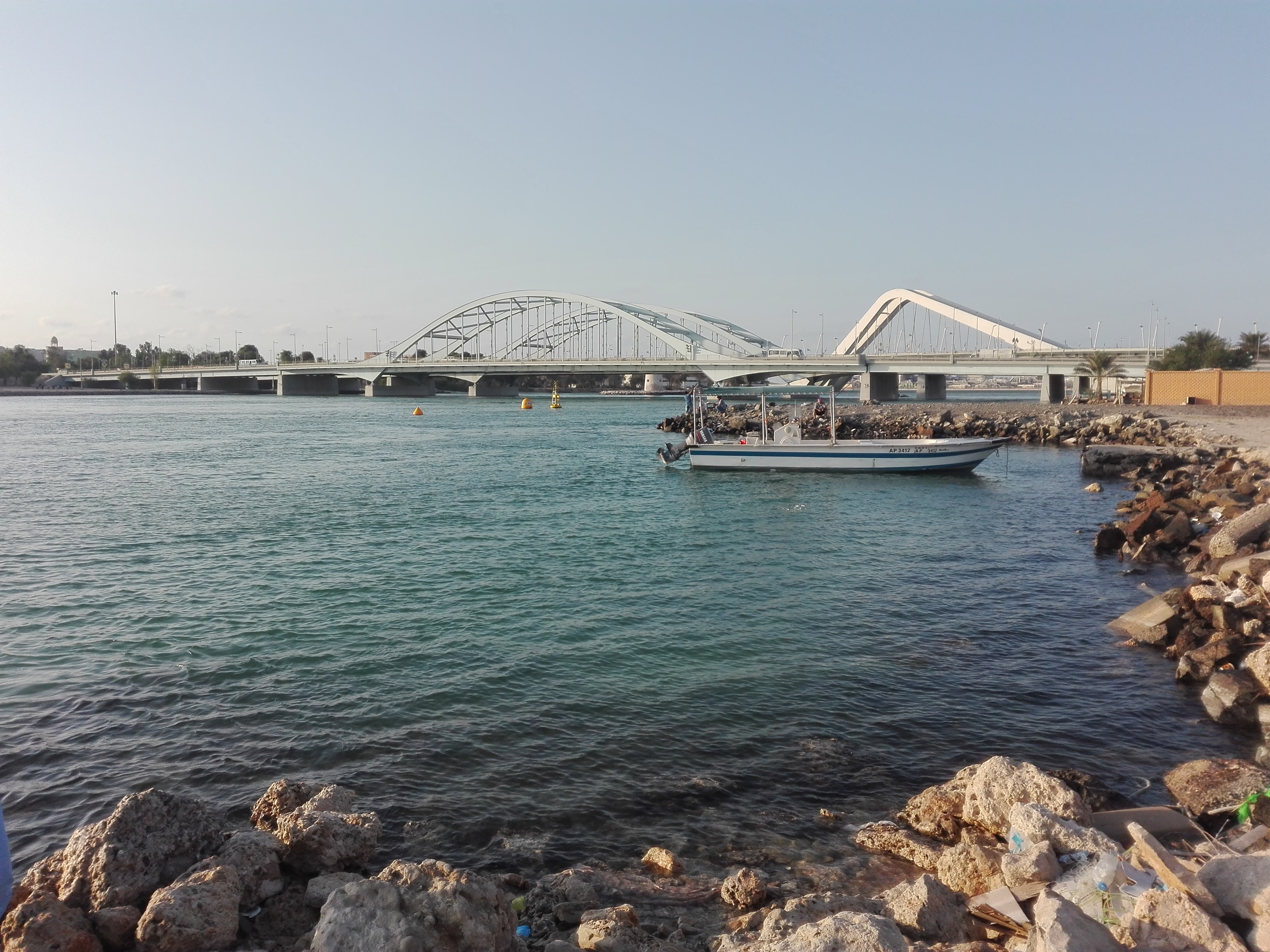
The Maqta' Bridge (Arabic: جِسْر ٱلْمَقْطَع, romanized: Jisr Al-Maqṭaʿ; front) and Sheikh Zayed Bridge (Arabic: جِسْر ٱلشَّيْخ زَايِد, romanized: Jisr Ash-Shaykh Zāyid; back) at Al-Maqṭaʿ (Arabic: ٱلْمَقْطَع), which connects the island of Abu Dhabi to the mainland

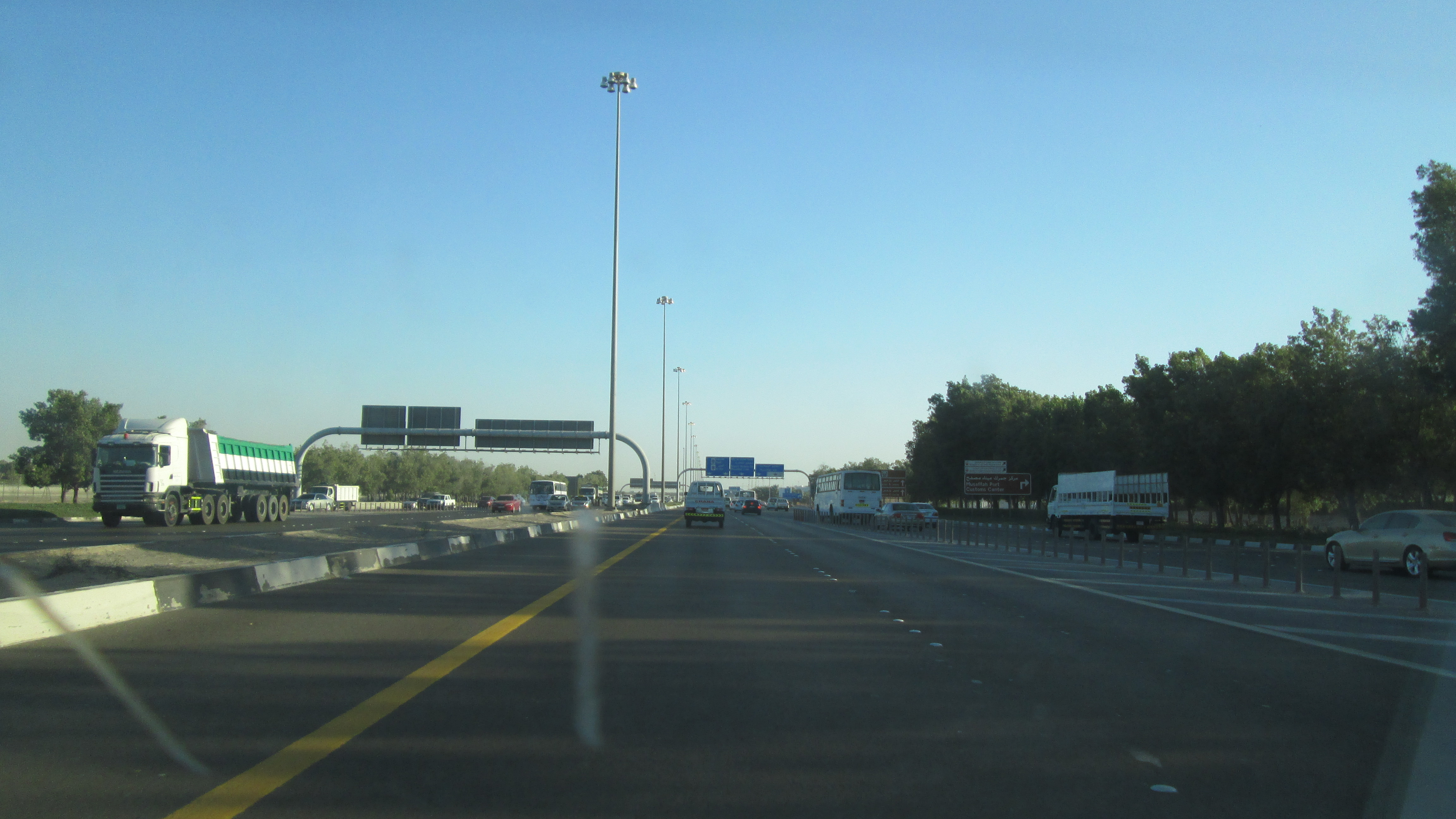
The E 30 highway connecting Abu Dhabi City to Al Ain City in the Eastern Region, going through Mussafah Industrial City

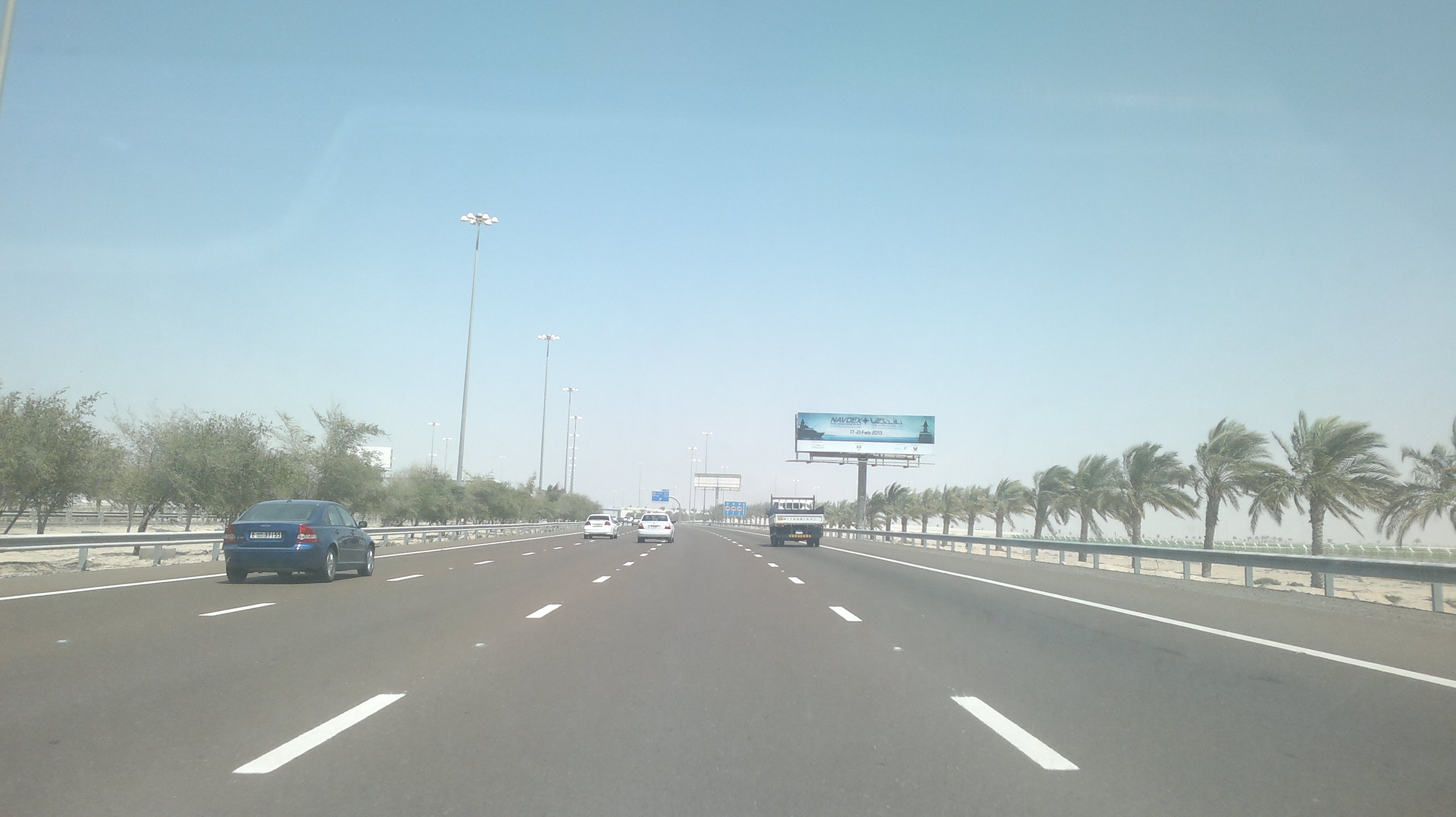
The E 11 highway leading to Dubai, passing through Ghantoot on the border of the Emirates of Abu Dhabi and Dubai

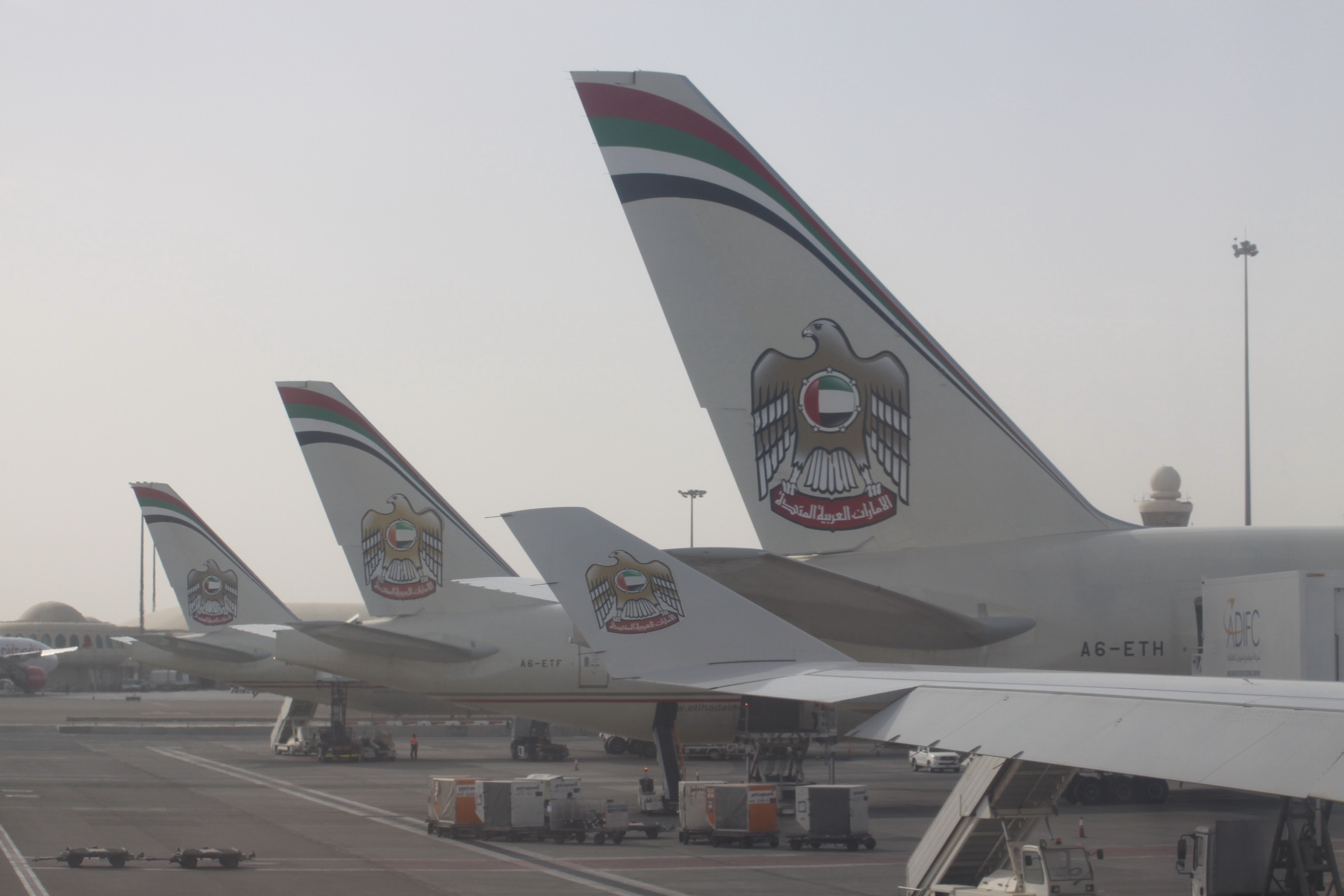
Planes belonging to Etihad Airways at Zayed International Airport

== See also ==
- Department of Municipal Affairs (Abu Dhabi)
- Dubai-Sharjah-Ajman metropolitan area
- Largest metropolitan areas of the Middle East
- List of cultural property of national significance in the United Arab Emirates
- List of tourist attractions in the United Arab Emirates
