= Abu Dhabi Terminals =

Port operator

Abu Dhabi Terminals (ADT) شركة مرافئ أبوظبى
- Industry: Terminal operator
- Founded: 2006
- Headquarters: Abu Dhabi, United Arab Emirates
- Key people: Capt. Mohamed Jumaa Al Shamsi, Chairman; Abdullah Al Hameli, Acting CEO
- Products: Container handling, warehousing, polymer packaging, multipurpose terminals operations
- Number of employees: 1,000
- Parent: Abu Dhabi Ports, Terminals Investment Limited, TIL
- Website: www.adterminals.ae

Abu Dhabi Terminals (Arabic: شركة مرافئ أبوظبى) or ADT was established in May 2006, by Emiri Decree No. (6) as the main port operator for all commercial ports in Abu Dhabi supporting the economic diversification in Abu Dhabi’s 2030 vision. Since 2018, it has is fully owned and operated by Abu Dhabi Ports itself part of ADQ, one of the region’s largest holding companies with a broad portfolio of major enterprises spanning key sectors of Abu Dhabi’s diversified economy. ADT was formed as part of the restructuring of the commercial ports sector in the Emirate and is the manager and operator of Khalifa Port Container Terminal (KPCT), the region’s first semi-automated and most technologically advanced terminal which was officially inaugurated on December 12, 2012. ADT's other facilities formerly included Zayed Port, a historical port that has served the capital for over 40 years and Musafah Port, located in the heart of the industrial area. Abu Dhabi Terminals was responsible for the smooth transition of container traffic from the old Zayed Port to the new Khalifa Port, located in Taweelah - midway between Dubai and Abu Dhabi.

== Khalifa Port Container Terminal ==
=== History ===
Khalifa Port is owned and developed by Abu Dhabi Ports and Abu Dhabi Terminals secured the exclusive rights in 2011 to manage and operate the container terminal at Khalifa Port for a period of 30 years. With 3 berths and 18-meter water depth alongside, Khalifa Port Container Terminal is located "offshore" on a reclaimed island and is the region’s first semi-automated container terminal, featuring some of the world’s largest ship-to-shore cranes and other container handling equipment for loading and unloading container ships. Phase 1 of KPCT has a capacity of 2.5 million TEU and the port has an expected capacity of 15 million TEU when all phases are completed.

Container volume has tripled in the Emirate of Abu Dhabi since Abu Dhabi Terminals transferred all container traffic to Khalifa Port, taking the direct international destinations from 5 to over 60 connecting ports worldwide, creating a better logistics network in the capital of the UAE. Khalifa Port Container Terminal is located adjacent to Khalifa Industrial Zone Abu Dhabi (Kizad) and will be the first port in the UAE to be connected to Etihad Rail. In 2015 Khalifa Port Container Terminal handled over 1.5 million TEU earning a second-place ranking in Alphaliner Top 110 growing ports in the world and new phases of expansion will start in 2016 with the delivery of new cranes.

In 2015 the terminal operator opened a polymer packing plant. The packing plant has an annual capacity of 700 Metric Tons and includes container tilting platform, FFS bagging equipment to fully automate bagging and palletizing services. The container terminal also has 2.5 million square foot of storage space for petrochemicals, polymer and other commodities.

In September 2016, KPCT's operator, Abu Dhabi Terminals, signed a 35-year concession agreement with CSP to create CSP Abu Dhabi Terminal.

=== Operations ===
In 2017, KPTC upgraded its handling capacity and became the first port in the region to trial and adopt an autonomous port truck system.

In 2021, Abu Dhabi Terminals introduced several upgrades to KPCT's handling capacity and automation profile, registering notable operational achievements in the process. In the course of these upgrades, KPCT's handling capacity was doubled with 5 new STS (ship-to-shore) cranes. In the same year, KPCT handled the heaviest breakbulk cargo shipment while offloading MSC Kalina, and achieved all-time-high berth productivity rate of 12,877 TEUs on MSC Tianshan.

Furthermore, Abu Dhabi Terminals teamed up with Microsoft to introduce AI-focused smart tracking solutions to the terminal, in addition to an autonomous shuttle system.

== See also ==
- Khalifa Port, Abu Dhabi's semi-automated container terminal and one of the most advanced in the Middle East.
