= Zayed Port =

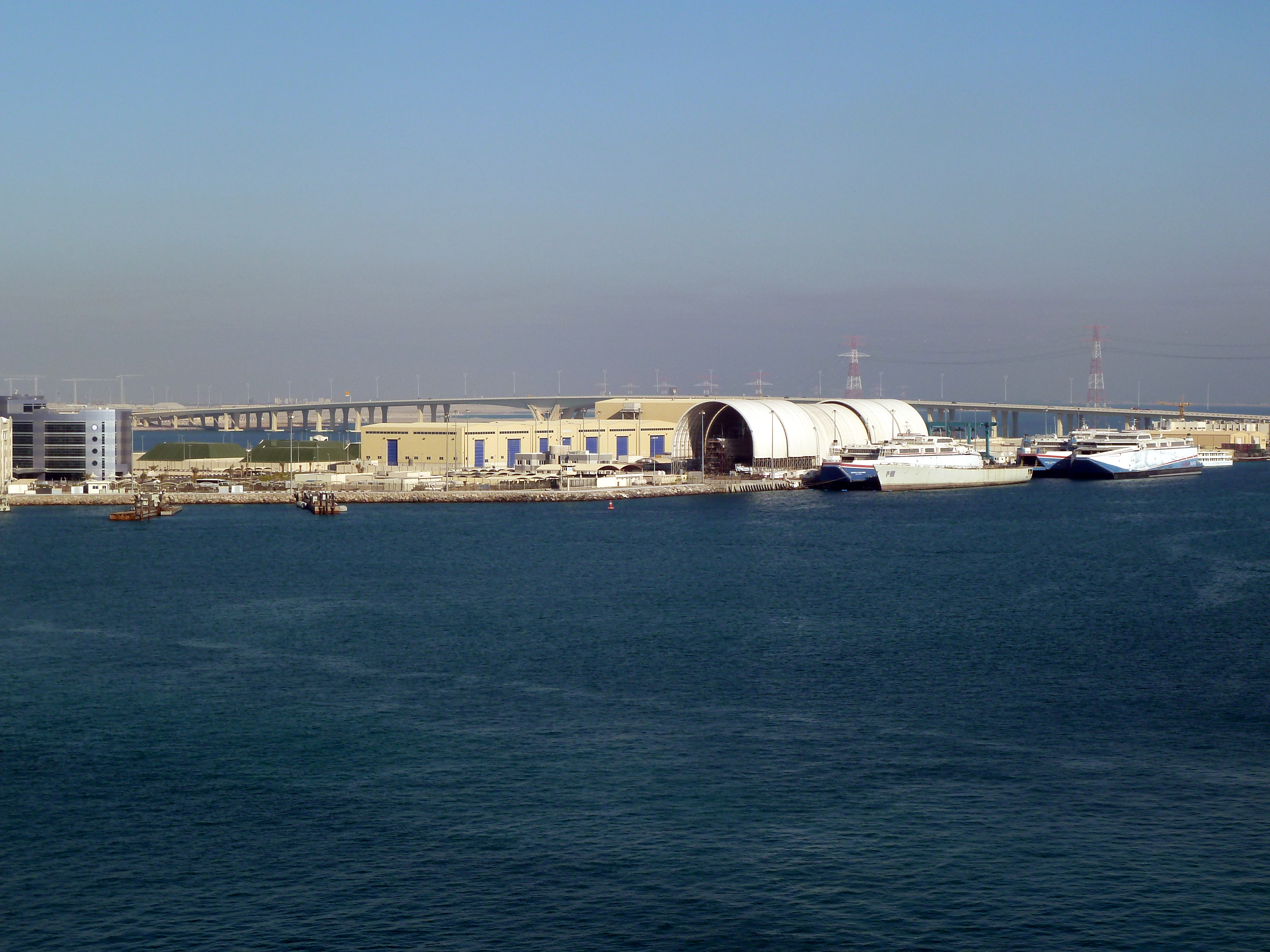
- Quayside at Abu Dhabi's Zayed Port
- Interactive map of Zayed Port

Location
- Country: Emirate of Abu Dhabi
- Location: Abu Dhabi
- Coordinates: 24.5253021°N 54.3769338°E
- UN/LOCODE: AEMZD

Details
- Opened: 1972
- Operated by: Abu Dhabi Ports
- Owned by: Abu Dhabi Ports
- Size: 535 hectares of which 41 were previously occupied by the container terminal
- Native name: ميناء زايد (Arabic)

Statistics
- Annual cargo tonnage: 900 000 ton
- Website; Abu Dhabi Ports

Zayed Port (Arabic: ميناء زايد) also called Mina Zayed, is a commercial deep-water port owned by the Abu Dhabi Ports that serves Abu Dhabi, United Arab Emirates. Established in 1968, Zayed Port is in the northeast section of Abu Dhabi city. It was officially inaugurated and became fully operational in 1972, and is named after Sheikh Zayed bin Sultan Al Nahyan, the former President of the United Arab Emirates. The transfer of Zayed Port's container traffic to the newly developed US$7.2 billion Khalifa Port container terminal was completed in 2012.

== Geography ==
Zayed Port covers an area of 535 hectares and contains 21 berths with depths ranging from 6 to 15 metres and a total berth length of 4,375 metres. It's one of four major ports in the emirate: the city's Zayed Port remains the gateway for general cargo vessels, RORO (roll-on/roll-off) and is emerging as a destination for international luxury cruise ship tourism; the nearby Free Port caters to smaller vessels, tugs, barges and service crafts; Musaffah Port is located in the heart of the industrial township of Musaffah; while the new state-of-the-art Khalifa Port in Taweelah handles all the emirate's container shipping.

== History ==
In light of the increasing importance of container shipping, a well-equipped container terminal was established at Zayed Port back in 1982. Covering an area of 41 hectares, the terminal had a storage capacity of 15,000 TEUs at any given time. Four deep water berths were provided with a total length of 931 metres and 15 metres depth. The berths were equipped with five 40-tonne cranes. As a result, Zayed Port's throughput in 1998 increased 34 per cent in container volume and 25 per cent in general cargo over 1997. The port's capacity to hold chilled, cool and frozen products was significantly increased when a 15,000 tone cold store became operational in 1999.

Benefiting from its strategic location in the heart of the capital, Zayed Port was instrumental in bolstering Abu Dhabi's international trade, being the main gateway for trade in the emirate and playing a pivotal role in supporting Abu Dhabi's Economic Vision 2030, the government's drive to achieve economic diversification.

As part of this vision, all container shipping in Zayed Port was eventually moved to the Abu Dhabi Ports' newly developed AED 26.5 billion AED (US$7.2 billion) megaproject Khalifa Port in Taweelah between Abu Dhabi and Dubai. Following the 100% TEU traffic transition from Zayed Port in September 2012, commercial operations at this new flagship state-of-the-art gateway were officially inaugurated by the President of the United Arab Emirates, Sheikh Khalifa Bin Zayed Al Nahyan on 12 December 2012.

Zayed Port is now the focus of the Abu Dhabi Ports's plans to redevelop the port as a major luxury cruise ship terminal. Abu Dhabi is currently a seasonal home port for AIDA Cruises, while Celebrity Cruises announced in December 2014 that they would be home porting their cruise ship Celebrity Constellation in Abu Dhabi from November, 2016 to January 2017.

In 2014 the Red Bull Air Race World Championship season opened in Zayed Port. This was the seventh occasion the competition was hosted in Abu Dhabi and marked the first time the city saw the event since 2010, when it had hosted the opener for six consecutive years starting from 2005.

== See also ==
- Al Ain
- Abu Dhabi, the capital of the UAE.
- Khalifa Port, the state-of-the art gateway to Abu Dhabi which handles all of the emirate's container traffic; the only semi-automated container terminal in the Middle East.
- Kizad, one of the world's largest free and non-free industrial zones.
- Musaffah Port, the dedicated port for Abu Dhabi's Musaffah Industrial Zone.
