= Samha =

Samha is both a surname and a given name. Notable people with the name include:

- Mohamad Al-Khaled Samha (born 1958), Syrian-born Danish imam
- Samha El-Kholy (1925–2006), Egyptian musicologist

== See also ==
- Al Samha, Emirati town
- Samhah, island in the Guardafui Channel
