= Mohamed Juma =

The name Mohamed Juma, or Juma'a, may refer to:

- Mohamed Juma (footballer), Bahraini footballer
- Mohamed Juma Al Shamisi, UAE entrepreneur
- Mohamed Juma Aldoy, Bahraini ice hockey player
- Mohamed Juma Basheer, UAE football player
- Mohamed Juma Buamaim, UAE entrepreneur
- Mohamed Hassan Juma, Iraqi middle-distance runner
- Mohamed Habib Juma Mnyaa, Tanzanian politician (born 1955)
- Mohamed Sameer Juma Albulushi, Omani swimmer
- Mohamed Wajih Juma'a, Syrian opposition member

== See also ==
- Juma Mohamed Ahmed Ali Gharib, UAE footballer (born 1989)
