= Khalifa Port =

Khalifa Port ميناء خليفة
- Interactive map of Khalifa Port ميناء خليفة

Location
- Country: Emirate of Abu Dhabi
- Location: Abu Dhabi
- Coordinates: 24°50′00″N 54°40′00″E
- UN/LOCODE: AEKHL

Details
- Opened: 2012
- Owned by: Abu Dhabi Ports
- Type of Harbor: Containers, Reefers, General Cargo, Dry & Liquid Bulk, Ro/Ro and Project cargo

Statistics
- Annual container volume: 2.5 million TEUs
- Website; Abu Dhabi Ports; Abu Dhabi Terminals

Khalifa Port (Arabic: ميناء خليفة) is the Abu Dhabi Ports' flagship deepwater port. It is a gateway to Abu Dhabi and handles all of the emirate’s container traffic. The transfer of container traffic from Zayed Port was completed in December 2012.

Khalifa Port has a Phase 1 capacity of 2.5 million TEUs and 12 million tonnes of general cargo a year and an expected capacity of 15 million TEUs and 35 million tonnes of general cargo by 2030.

After a three-month transition of container operations from Abu Dhabi's Zayed Port, Abu Dhabi Ports' Khalifa Port was officially inaugurated by the President of the United Arab Emirates, Sheikh Khalifa Bin Zayed Al Nahyan on 12 December 2012.

== Geography ==
The port is part of the Maritime Silk Road that runs from the Chinese coast to the south via the southern tip of India to Mombasa, from there through the Red Sea via the Suez Canal to the Mediterranean, there to the Upper Adriatic region to the northern Italian hub of Trieste with its rail connections to Central Europe, Eastern Europe and the North Sea.

The port island, which includes the region’s only semi-automated container terminal, is 2.7 km^{2} (1.05 square miles) and is situated some 5 km (3.12 miles) offshore. It is joined to the onshore by a north and south causeway and a 1 km-long road and utility bridge. The port’s container yard has nine of the world's largest ship-to-shore quay cranes, 42 automated stacking cranes, and 23 shuttle carriers. The onshore port area, which connects the port with Kizad (Khalifa Industrial Zone Abu Dhabi) hosts customs, immigration, container freight, inspection, and security facilities.

The semi-automated process allows more container capacity with minimal congestion and faster turnaround times, compared to older methods. The inventory stacks in the yard are fully automated, and the delivery and loading information and advanced GPS tracking information is fully integrated with customs to increase throughput.

The port’s software and wireless technologies provide integrated movement of containers through the port. It has transport links to Abu Dhabi and beyond via high-speed road. As of 2013 rail connections were planned. On 29 October 2014 Abu Dhabi Terminals celebrated the handling of 2 million containers at Khalifa Port.

On 24 February 2013 Abu Dhabi Ports chairman Sultan Ahmed Al Jaber announced that Khalifa Port would be the official shirt sponsor for football team Al Ain FC during the 2013 AFC Champions League.

After reaching 905,000 TEUs in 2013, a rise of 17 percent, container traffic at Khalifa Port is expected to climb to around 1.3 million TEUs by the end of 2014, a further increase of 22 percent.

== Khalifa Port Container Terminal ==
The container terminal at Khalifa Port is managed and operated by Abu Dhabi Terminals (ADT), a joint venture between Abu Dhabi Ports, Mubadala and Mubadala Infrastructure Partners. ADT signed a 30-year concession agreement with Abu Dhabi Ports to manage and operate Khalifa Port Container Terminal until 2042.

Abu Dhabi Terminals was established in 2006 as the operator of all ports in the Emirate of Abu Dhabi and formerly operated Zayed Port and the Freeport in Musaffah. Under Abu Dhabi Terminals' leadership, Khalifa Port Container Terminal has tripled the container trade in Abu Dhabi and currently connects Abu Dhabi to 62 direct international destinations.

In 2015, Abu Dhabi Terminals handled 32% more containers. The terminal moved 1,504,293 TEUs (twenty foot equivalent units/containers), up from 1,137,679 TEUs in 2014. In H1 2016, Abu Dhabi Terminals volume at Khalifa Port grew by 11%, taking the lead again in the Middle East region for fastest growing container terminal as most ports announced flat or negative growth.

The port is also the first port in the middle east to have autonomous port truck systems.

== See also ==
- Musaffah Port, the dedicated port for Abu Dhabi's Musaffah Industrial Zone.
