= Australian Maritime College =

Maritime college in Tasmania, Australia

Coordinates: 41°23′54″S 147°7′16″E

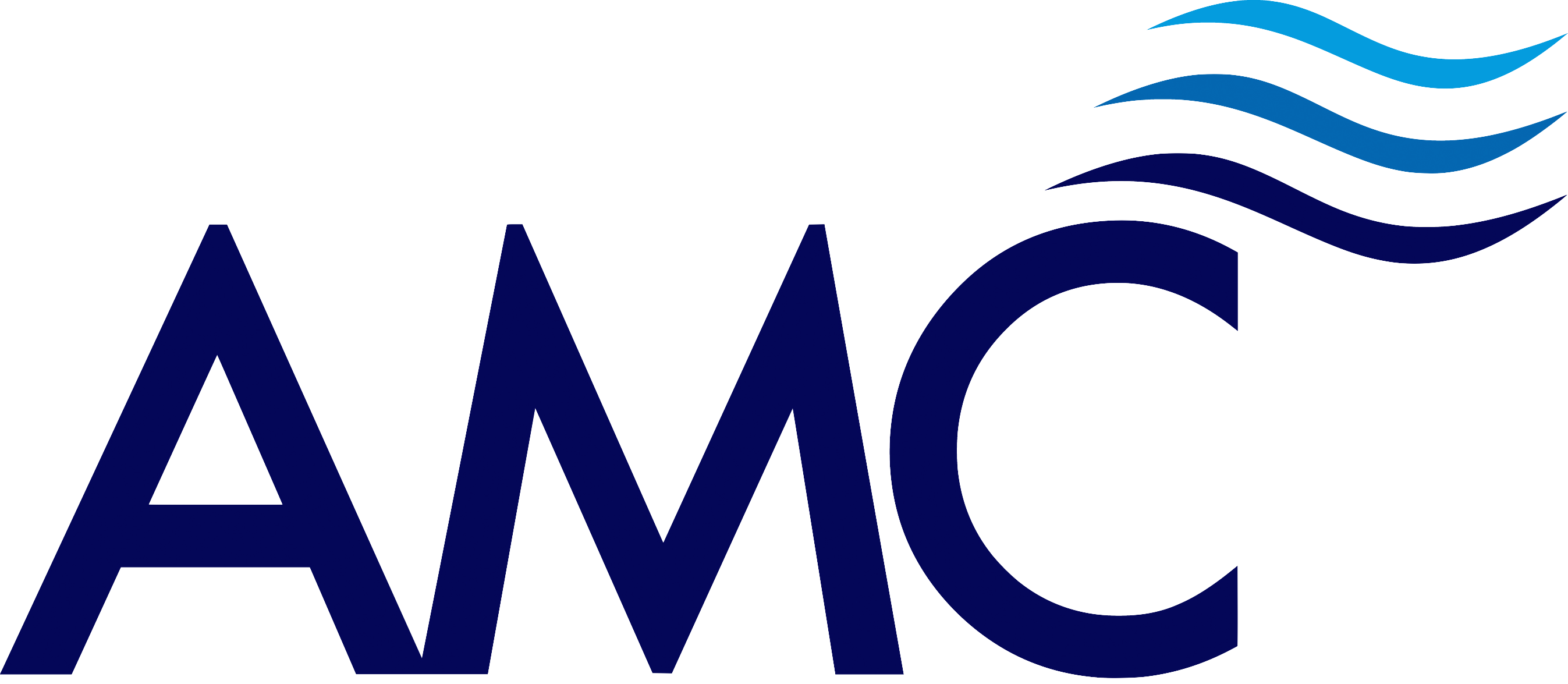
- Other name: AMC
- Type: Public
- Established: 1980
- Affiliations: International Association of Maritime Universities (IAMU) and the University of Tasmania
- Principal: Mal Wise AM
- Students: 861 EFTSL (2010)
- Location: Launceston and Beauty Point, Tasmania, Australia
- Campus: Newnham, Beauty Point, Tasmania
- Colours: Navy blue
- Website: www.amc.edu.au

The Australian Maritime College (AMC) is a tertiary education institution based in Launceston, Tasmania, established by the Maritime College Act 1978 (Cth). Tertiary education is provided and organised by the University of Tasmania (UTAS) as the Australian Maritime College at the University of Tasmania (AMC@UTAS). The college's educational curriculum is governed by the independent AMC Board. The AMC is Australia's national centre for maritime education, training and research. It has two campuses located within 50 kilometres (31 mi) of each other in Northern Tasmania, each with different facilities and residence. The AMC's two national centres are the National Centre for Maritime Engineering and Hydrodynamics and the National Centre for Ports and Shipping. AMC also has a commercial arm, AMC Search Ltd, that provides maritime related training and consultancy for a wide range of international and Australian organisations and individuals including the Federal Government Pacific Patrol Boat Program.

== Beauty Point facilities ==
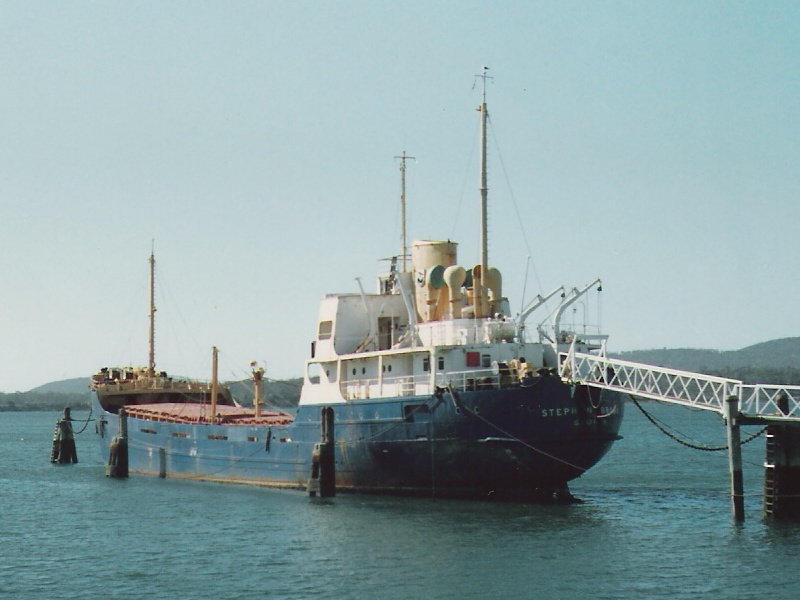
Stephen Brown at her berth in 1987

The Beauty Point facilities are home to AMC's training vessels, including Reviresco, and Stephen Brown.

== Accommodation ==
=== Investigator Hall ===
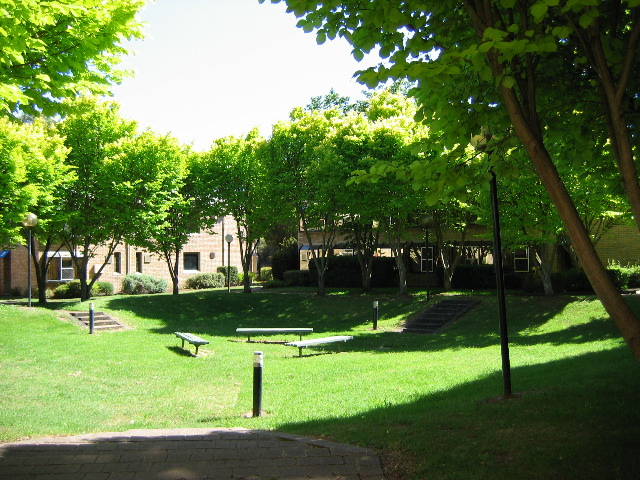
Sunken Garden in the centre of Investigator Hall

Investigator Hall is AMC's residence on the Newnham Campus and provides catered accommodation to both AMC and University of Tasmania students. The residence is named after HMS Investigator, the vessel used by Matthew Flinders to circumnavigate Australia.

== Programs ==
The AMC offers both undergraduate and postgraduate programs in fields such as Maritime Engineering & Hydrodynamics, Maritime Business & International Logistics and Ocean Seafaring. In addition the AMC also offers Coastal Seafaring VET course. The AMC also manages and teaches maritime and logistics management major courses in the Bachelor of Business and Master of Business Administration programs together with the Tasmanian School of Business and Economics, UTAS.

=== Radio operator licensing ===
AMC runs courses in maritime radio procedures and also testing for maritime radio operator licenses.

In March 2019, AMC was awarded by the Australian Communications and Media Authority (ACMA) a Deed of Agreement to provide Amateur Radio license testing for Australia, and administration of license issue recommendations to ACMA. AMC has used an already established system of exam invigilators, often associated with Amateur Radio Clubs, who receive license tests from AMC upon application by candidates, conduct the test session, and return the tests to AMC for marking and further administration. While ACMA formally issues licenses, it does so upon advice from ACM that also administers beacon and repeater licenses, and changes of licenses.

== Notable alumni ==
- CEO of Abu Dhabi Ports Capt. Mohamed Juma Al Shamisi
- Head of Maritime Union of Australia Mich-Elle Myers
- Former Minister of Fisheries, Marine Resources and Agriculture Hussain Rasheed Hassan

== See also ==
- List of universities in Australia
