= Musaffah Port =

Musaffah Port ميناء مصفّح
- Interactive map of Musaffah Port ميناء مصفّح

Location
- Country: Emirate of Abu Dhabi
- Location: Abu Dhabi
- Coordinates: 24°22′54″N 54°28′09″E
- UN/LOCODE: AEAMF

Details
- Opened: 1998
- Owned by: Abu Dhabi Ports
- Type of harbour: General cargo and warehousing
- Size: 37,500 square meters

Statistics
- Website https://www.adports.ae/ports-terminals/commercial-ports/musaffah-port/

Musaffah Port (Arabic: ميناء مصفّح) is an Abu Dhabi Ports' port located in the industrial area of Musaffah south west of the city of Abu Dhabi. The deepwater Musaffah Port and Musaffah Channel include a general cargo terminal at the northwest corner of the Musaffah Industrial Area, as well as an extensive waterfront nearly 40 km long that is occupied by numerous private berths and terminals. It's the city's second port after the establishment of Location Zayed Port in 1972.

The port and channel serve the adjacent Musaffah Industrial Area and the industrial areas of ICAD I, ICAD II and ICAD III. A number of large commercial and industrial companies occupy the waterfront, including steel works, shipyards, rig construction, offshore construction and supply, dredging, shipping and construction companies.

== Developing Musaffah ==
In the 1990s, after a period of local restoration and infrastructural works, interest increased in developing Abu Dhabi's nearby township of Mussafah as an industrial center. In 1996, the Abu Dhabi Seaports Authority announced a Dh2.4 billion development plan of the area, including the building of a new port in Mussafah. In 1998, many medium-rise buildings, mostly for offices, were proposed, and a local police station was built.

== New Musaffah Channel ==
Built to provide a safe navigation channel with unrestricted air draft for vessels between the Musaffah Industrial Port and the Persian Gulf, a US$411 million (AED 1.5 billion) upgrade deepwater Musaffah Channel was completed and handed over to Abu Dhabi Ports in February 2011, nearly doubling the channel depth after dredging more than six million cubic metres of sand. The new channel replaced the existing access channel to the Mussafah Industrial Area. Located off the south-western shoreline of Hudayriat Island, the 53 km channel was built to better serve the Mussafah Industrial Zone and the future ICAD areas.

The port facility provides for cargo operations and warehousing for a wide range of clients. A new tunnel of 280 m length links the airport with Musaffah. The Musaffah Channel is a man-made canal, with gypsum crystals described as large and bladed. The banks at the eastern end of the Musaffah Channel reportedly have "Pleistocene reworked dune deposits, unconformably overlain by Holocene carbonates and sabkha evaporates". The channel's inner reaches are situated approximately 7 kilometres (4.3 mi) inland from the location of the present-day lagoon. The port has a 342 metres (1,122 ft) long main quay and two 40 metres (130 ft) long side quays and covers an area of 37,500 square metres (404,000 sq ft). The depth of draft is 11 metres (36 ft) at the port and is linked with the new Musaffah Channel (a channel dredged 9 metres (30 ft) below the datum) which is about 53 kilometres (33 mi) in length.

== Rail links ==
Phase 1

By 2016, Etihad Rail, the United Arab Emirates's national railway, is expected to launch a 1,200 kilometres (750 mi) railway network across the emirates. The first stage would be a 270 kilometres (170 mi) freight line, linking Ruwais to the Shah gas field, in cooperation with Abu Dhabi National Oil Company.

Beyond the first stage, the next priority is connecting the railway to Mussafah, to the Persian Gulf ports of Khalifa Port and Jebel Ali Port as well as the Saudi and Omani borders.

In April 2013, Etihad Rail received the first two of seven locomotives to be shipped to the UAE at Musaffah Port. The two locomotives were the first stock to arrive since the delivery of the company's wagons in December 2012, together with which will form the UAE's first trains.

Phase 2

In September 2022, Etihad Rail connected major freight terminal in Abu Dhabi to main network as part of Phase 2 of the Ethiad Rail project and the first batches of Etihad Rail's new state-of-the-art fleet of trains arrived in the UAE through Zayed and Al Musaffah Ports, which comes as part of Etihad Rail's commitment to expanding its fleet of trains to serve the entire network.

== See also ==
- Al Ain
- Abu Dhabi, the capital of the UAE.
- Khalifa Port, the state-of-the art gateway to Abu Dhabi which handles all of the emirate's container traffic; the only semi-automated container terminal in the Middle East.
- KEZAD, one of the world's largest free and non-free industrial zones.
- Zayed Port, the port of Abu Dhabi city.
