= Salam Street =

Main road in the city of Abu Dhabi, the United Arab Emirates

Coordinates: 24°26′41.4″N 54°25′56.5″E

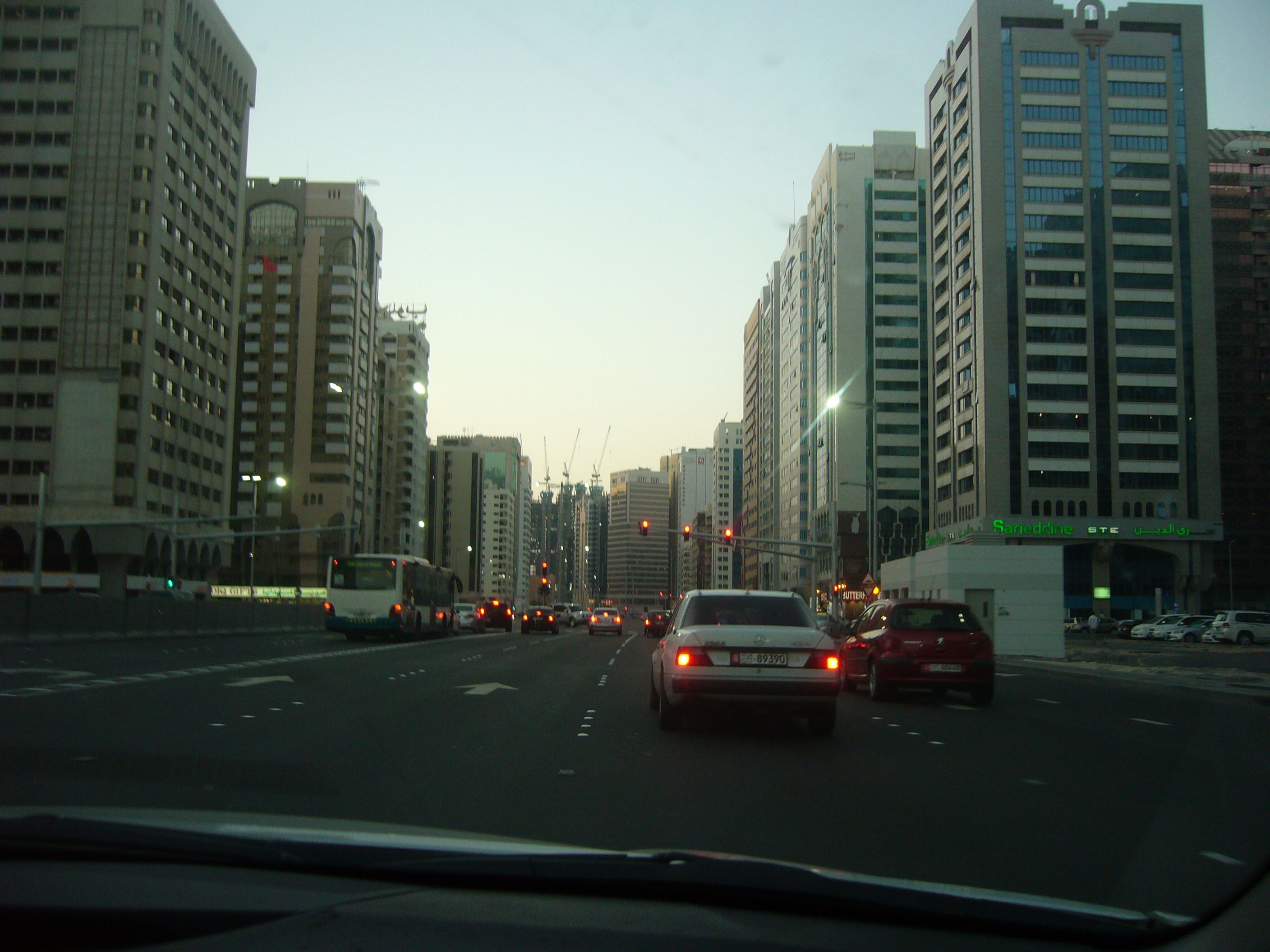
Salam Street towards the Corniche

Salam Street (Arabic: شَارِع ٱلسَّلَام, romanized: Shāriʿ As-Salām), now renamed as "Sheikh Zayed bin Sultan Street" (Arabic: شَارِع ٱلشَّيْخ زَايِد بِن سُلْطَان, romanized: Shāriʿ Ash-Shaykh Zāyid Bin Sulṭān), and less commonly known as 8th Street or Eastern Ring Road, is one of the main roads in the city of Abu Dhabi. It starts from Sheikh Zayed Bridge and curves its way around Abu Dhabi's eastern end until it ends at the intersection with Corniche Road. Salam Street runs through the main modern shopping area and Robat Street, the new bypass north of the town.

== Description ==
In earlier years, Salam Street used to end at the intersection with Saada Street (Shakhbout Bin Sultan Street). It as then extended to the end of Abu Dhabi Island and it the turns to end at an intersection with Al Khaleej Al Arabi Street and to intersect with Old Airport Road (Sheikh Rashid Bin Saeed Street) on the way. That turn has been built but is considered as a mere exit from Salam Street instead of an extension.

In 2012, the Sheikh Zayed Tunnel opens to the public after five years of construction. The tunnel is located under Salam Street and stretches for 2.4km from Sheikh Fatima Bint Mubarak Street (formerly Delma Street) to the Corniche or Mina Road.

=== Intersections ===
This is a list of the roads that intersect with Salam Street in order starting from the Corniche Road intersection until the Sheikh Zayed Bridge:

- Corniche Road
- Khalifa Street (Khalifa Bin Zayed The First Street) (no traffic light)
- Mina Street
- Hamdan Street
- Electra Street (Zayed The First Street) (former Zayed II street)
- Abu Dhabi Mall Road (13th Street)
- 19th Street
- Falah Street
- Hazza ' Bin Zayed Street
- Sea Palace Road
- Saada Street (Shakhbout Bin Sultan Street)
- 23rd Street
- 25th Street
- 29th Street
- 31st Street

=== Attractions ===
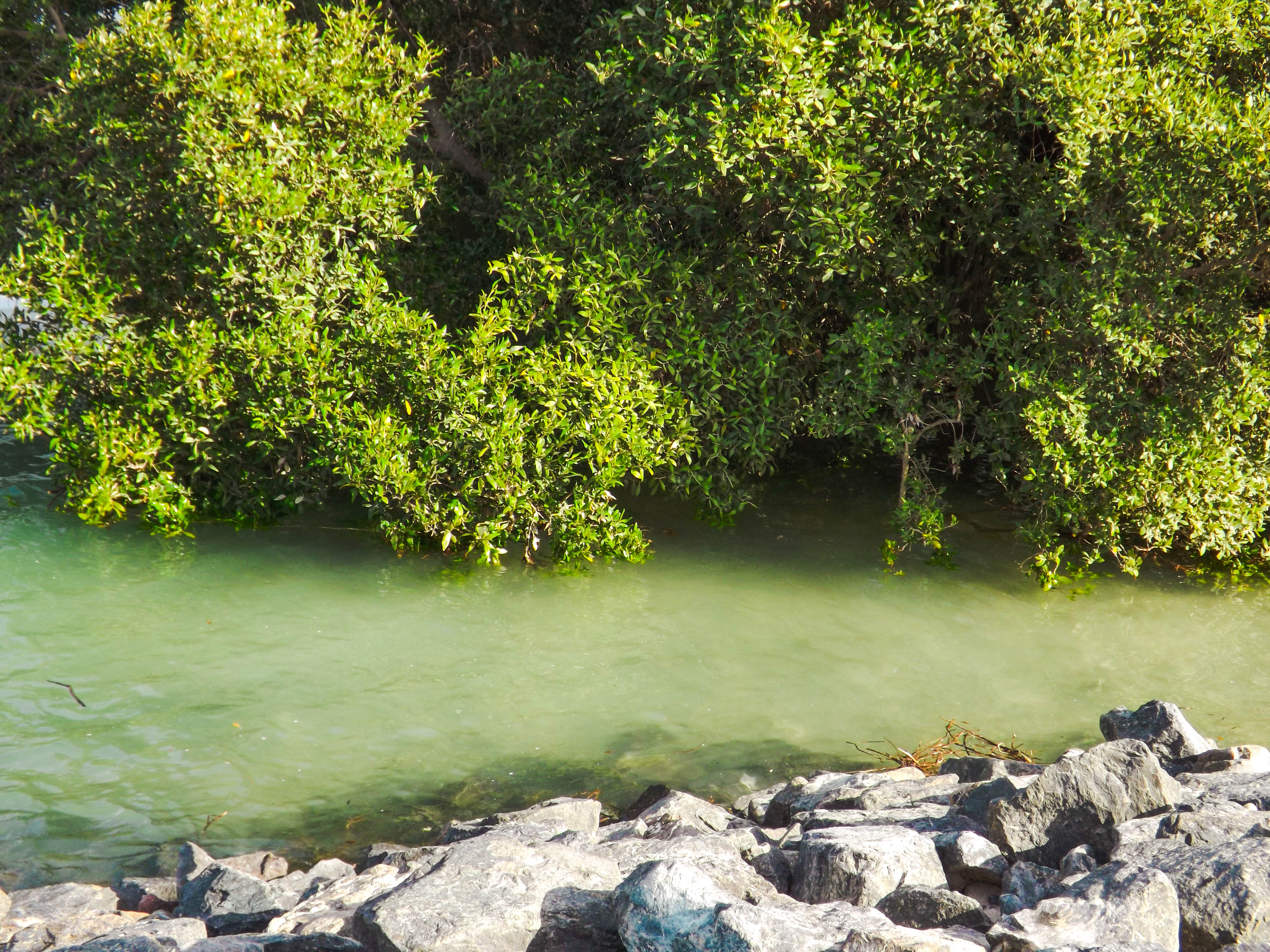
Mangroves along Al Qurm Corniche

Along the road, there are several sights to be seen:

- Mangroves at Mangrove National Park, near Al Qurn Corniche (Al-Qurm (Arabic: ٱلْقُرْم) meaning "The Mangrove"). The corniche is popular amongst residents of Abu Dhabi as a leisure spot.
- Khalifa Park
- ADCB Headquarters
- Geneva Clock
- Abu Dhabi Municipality Building
- ADNOC Headquarters
- National Drilling Company Headquarters
- UNB Headquarters
- Sheraton Beach Resort
- Lulu Center
- Corniche Hospital

== See also ==
- Zayed Bin Sultan Street in Al Ain, which connects the Emirate of Abu Dhabi to Oman
