= Australian Maritime College Newnham campus =

Australian Maritime College, Newnham Campus
- Location within Tasmania
- 41.4002°S 147.1184°E
- Location: 100 Newnham Drive, Newnham, Tasmania, Australia

Commonwealth Heritage List
- Official name: Australian Maritime College, Newnham Campus
- Type: Listed place (Historic)
- Designated: 22 June 2004
- Reference no.: 105663

The Newnham campus of the Australian Maritime College is a heritage-listed university campus at 100 Newnham Drive, Newnham, Tasmania, Australia. It was formerly a prominent pastoral estate known as Newnham Estate. It was added to the Australian Commonwealth Heritage List on 22 June 2004.

== History ==
The earliest record of European ownership of the land which became the Newnham Estate was in 1822 when Martin Mowbray Stephenson took up a grant of 500 acres on the Tamar River. A significant part of Stephenson's property later formed the Newnham Estate which was bounded by Newnham Creek, George Town Road, the River Tamar and subsequently the Launceston City Boundary. By 1825 he had erected a house, outhouses and barn overlooking a stretch of the River Tamar known as Stephenson's Bend.

Lieutenant Matthew Curling Friend, of the Royal Navy was responsible for first developing the Newnham Estate. In April 1830, as master of the 'Wanstead', he arrived in Hobart Town with his wife and his brothers Daniel, Charles and George. He applied for a grant of land but left for England in May and returned in July 1832 as master of the 'Norval' with his wife and her mother.

Friend's residence, which he called 'Newnham', was built in the early 1830s. A 1833 survey of the Stephenson's Bend area shows four buildings on the major grant which are within Friend's property; and an 1835 advertisement for the lease of Newnham Estate described a substantial house with an extensive series of outbuildings around a courtyard to the north-east of the house. The advertisement also refers to two cottages on the property, which presumably refers to the Riverside Cottage and the Lodge, demolished in 1979.

Friend's Colonial Georgian style residence probably had four principal rooms to both floors, with a verandah to the river front (south-west) elevation. The attic floor within the roof was probably intended for further accommodation. The 1835 description refers to a domestic courtyard group of two buildings with a central well; and a farm courtyard with two sides being enclosed with extensive sheds, cow and feeding houses. Lieutenant Friend only held the property a few years, for he was probably required to relocate his residence due to his Port Officer duties. John Cameron bought Newnham Hall from Matthew Curling Friend in 1836 and lived there for about twenty years.

In July 1837, John Cameron had already paid 1000 pounds to Matthew Curling Friend and had drawn up bills of exchange totalling another 2,800 pounds. Those bills of exchange were due to be honoured at regular intervals from January 1836 until the last one in 1840, giving Cameron absolute purchase of 70 acres, one rood and four perches, being part of two grants of land to Matthew Curling Friend.

The 1837 sale provided for a 'right of way' to the Newnham Estate from the Launceston road to the bank of River Tamar and the Jetty on the south side of the creek at a place called Stoney Point. Three more transactions, in 1839, 1840 and 1848, completed the land dealings between Friend and Cameron. By the early 1850s, it appears that John Cameron had left Newnham and was in the process of selling his various lands to William Gardner. Gardner purchased the core seventy acre property in 1853. This comprised Newnham Hall, outbuildings, park, orchard and farm lands and allowed for 'right of way' from the Launceston road to the jetty on the River Tamar, and provided for the sale of other portions of the property.

William Atkinson Gardner (1815 - 1855) had arrived in Launceston from Manchester in 1851 and purchased Newnham in 1853. He was the Vice-President of the Launceston Mechanics Institute; and the Member of the Tasmanian Legislative Council for the seat of Cornwall from March 1855 to his death, aged forty, on 22 June that year. Newnham was offered for lease, and an advertisement in The Examiner of that date described the property as a first class residence, beautifully situated, with a frontage on the River Tamar. The house contained 18 rooms with numerous outbuildings, kitchens, scullery, wine cellar, stores, and men's huts; a large tank, with force-pump; stables, loose boxes, coach houses, straw yard, stock yard, fowl and pigeon houses. There were seven acres of productive garden ground and orchard, twenty-nine acres of parkland, and forty-one acres in convenient paddocks for agriculture. The 15 ft wide verandah bounded the house on two sides. The house was fitted with a patent water closet, and a force pump, from which water was conveyed to the upper storey. There was also a large reservoir and a good well of water. The gardens were stocked with young and choice fruit trees and vegetables, and in one of them was a comfortable gardener's cottage.

It seems probable that John Cameron, who had held the property for sixteen years, added the large breakfront and pediment extension to the original Colonial Georgian house and erected the north eastern building of the farm courtyard group during his occupancy. With the death of William Gardner, the entire property, now 126 acres, was put up for sale on 12 November 1855.

By 1855, the Newnham Estate was one of the grandest estates in the north of Tasmania; and the Hall itself was one of the largest Colonial residences in Tasmania. The gracious 15 ft wide verandah extended symmetrically across the River front facade, and the ornamented verandah pilasters were relieved by light treillage arches which spanned between the posts. The ground floor French doors, and upper bedroom windows, were all fitted with external louvred shutters. In architectural terms, the Cameron additions to the principal (riverside front) elevation added Classical Revival detailing in the pedimented breakfront and elaborate verandah decoration.

However, perhaps the most spectacular architectural feature was the internal decoration of the three principal Cameron rooms. A 1939 account by a curator from the Queen Victoria Museum and Art Gallery, Eric Scott, described the ornate Classical Revival style of the Newnham Hall interiors. The interiors he examined comprised two large rooms (drawing room, billiard room) and entrance hall, decorated in the highly ornate Classical Style, characterized by elaborate three-division cornices, ceilings with painted, multicoloured Greek and Etruscan pattern-ornament, highly coloured woodwork. With the rooms maintaining the general appearance they must have presented about a century before Scott's account, he described the interior of this building as representing 'an historical treasure for Tasmania'.

Following William Gardner's death, John Cameron regained control of Newnham Hall. On 1 July 1857, William Dawson Grubb paid 4,200 pounds to become the new owner of Newnham Hall. The purchase of the Newnham Estate by William Dawson Grubb was the final phase of private ownership of the house and much of the land; and the Grubb family became probably the best known of all the Estate's owners.

William Dawson Grubb (1817-1879) had arrived in Van Diemens Land in March 1832, and then returned to England to read law. In 1842 he returned to Launceston, and was admitted as a barrister and solicitor. He undertook various business ventures, and purchased the Newnham Estate in 1857. The couple's youngest son, William Crooks Grubb, inherited the property and when he died in 1918 it was bought by Samuel Tulloch Scott, the husband of William Crooks Grubb's second child, Harley Marianne Louisa Grubb. Scott did not reside there and Newnham Hall was rented out until the State Government bought the property in 1940. The extended period of ownership by one family of the Newnham Estate was imprinted into the fabric of the property.

The creation of a stud for Jersey cows and Suffolk sheep by the Newnham Sheep Stud in 1922 was paralleled by the sale of outlying sections of the original property, probably in response to the encroaching suburban development of the city of Launceston. The stud ceased operation and the tenant, H. von Steiglitz, vacated the property, probably in the early 1930s.

There was considerable disquiet at this time as to the future of the property and its buildings and in 1939, Eric Scott, of the Queen Victoria Museum & Art Gallery, wrote to the state Minister for Social Services, Eric Howroyd, pointing out that if the government acquired the property it would be a splendid opportunity to arrange for its preservation at a relatively insignificant cost. Scott emphasised the need to conserve Newnham Hall and its extraordinary decoration.

In between the sale of the property to the Education Department in 1940 and the restoration of Newnham Hall in the late 1970s, all remnants of the decorations described by Mr Scott were obliterated and all the features that gave the riverside Hall rooms their character were removed.

In 1946, Newnham Hall opened as Newnham Hall Hostel, housing girls from rural areas of Northern Tasmania who were attending Launceston High School. In 1948 Dr Dick Whitford, responsible for the introduction of comprehensive high school systems within Tasmania, established the experimental Newnham Community School. At the time of acquisition, the Newnham property was reduced to just over 178 acres, with a cluster of buildings around the Hall, and two small cottages, one at the Tamar River frontage (Riverside Cottage) and the other between the stables and the dairy (the Early Cottage or Lodge now demolished).

By 1945, the Hall had been radically altered with extensions to the rear, to serve its use as a hostel for High School girls. These additions comprised lean-to extensions to the original Friend building; and the addition of a building to the southeast which was placed hard up against the Newnham Hall walls and required the demolition of the southern end of the Cameron verandah.

In the early 1960s Newnham Hall was becoming engulfed by suburban development. The Tasmanian College of Advanced Education (Newnham Campus) annexed the northern section of the former Newnham property; and in 1962, the Newnham Hostel was adapted for use as part of the G. V. Brooks High School, renamed Brooks High School in 1964. In 1965 and 1966 new science laboratories and a gymnasium were built close to Newnham Hall and in 1972, a new School administration building was added. Further additions in the 1970s included additions to the north of the Hall and the removal of the early domestic courtyard buildings, the dairy and kitchen.

In 1977, a proposal was put forward to annex the former Newnham Hall property as a new campus for the Australian Maritime College (AMC). This was part of a Federal Government initiative in the late 1970s to decentralize and relocate scientific and ocean based research activity to Tasmania. Other facilities established at this time were the Australian Antarctic Division at Kingston and the CSIRO Sea Fisheries Research Laboratories in Hobart. In 1978 the Newnham property was gifted to the Federal Government for use as the AMC. The extent of the transferred property was 13.25 hectares.

In 1979, the adaptation of the stables and house was undertaken to allow the use of these buildings by the college. Further college buildings were constructed around the Hall and, the former Brooks High School laboratories were modified.

Further modification was made to the former Newnham Hall buildings in the 1980s and 1990s; and in 1987 Joan Finlay's 'History of Newnham Hall' was published. Additional building for Australian Maritime College accommodation was undertaken around the historic building core. In 2002 the Australian Maritime College commissioned Artas Architects and Planners to prepare a Masterplan Review for the campus, including a Conservation Management Plan by Freeman Randell. The Australian Maritime College now has two campuses. The main campus, Newnham, hosts The College Administration, the Faculty of Maritime Transport and Engineering. Its second campus is home of the Faculty of Fisheries and Marine Environment is at Beauty Point, 50 km north of Launceston.

== Description ==
=== Views ===
In the 19th century and early 20th century, the Newham Hall property could be seen as a discrete cultural landscape. The natural landscape had been shaped and modified by the pastoral and building activities of the Newnham property; and included the planting of hedgerows and the parcelling into paddocks of 'green fields' property; the creation of driveways, avenues and formal plantings; the defining of views from the property to the landscapes beyond; particularly to the Tamar River; and the construction of formal and functional buildings to service the property. Some of these cultural landscape elements still exist, in particular the relationship of the open areas in front of Newnham Hall to the Tamar River beyond and the entrance driveway.

Significant views include views from the Tamar River and from the opposite shore of the Tamar River of the Newnham Hall landscape, an historic view evidenced by the painting of Stephenson's Bend; views of the Newnham Hall, Riverside Cottage and the heritage landscape of mature trees and hedgerows from the East Tamar Highway; views from Newnham Hall, the Riverside Cottage and the other heritage precincts to the Tamar River; view of the main entrance gates and driveway planting; pedestrian views along the enclosed planting of the entrance driveway; the sense of open planted areas enclosed by hedges of the home paddock, the Newnham Hall riverside garden, the orchard and the vegetable garden; views of grassed areas leading toward the Riverside Cottage, including the playing fields and hedgerows; vistas up and down the Riverside Cottage Avenue; views to and through the orchard of formally planted and productive fruit trees; views to the enclosed stableyard across open space; views inside the stableyard; views from the sides and rear of Newnham Hall into the garden and courtyard spaces.

=== Historic Precincts ===
==== Precinct A - Entrance Driveway ====
It is likely that the driveway in its present form dates from the 1850s the same period as the parkland and riverside garden. In 1922, the Hall standing on some 10 acres of gardens and shrubberies, was approached by a drive from The Park, along each side of which flowering shrubs and various flowers grow in the greatest profusion.

The gravel entrance driveway curves from the entrance gates in a gap between the current AMC main administration, Swanson Building (Building 1), and the Simulator Building (Building 2) down to the garden (SW) front of Newnham Hall. The drive is edged with hedges, shrubs and trees. A pair of wrought iron entrance gates sit between a modern curved face brick wall at the top of the drive. Gates of this type can date from the 1840s.

The top of the drive has been eroded but on its southern side a steep slope retains the edge of the drive above the home paddock. Halfway down the drive informal tracks lead off into the paddock. On the northern side of the drive are simple lawn areas with some recent trees. Landscape features of the entrance driveway include mature large trees; box hedges; agapanthus ribbon plantings; SE Shrubbery - mature traditional shrubs; NW shrubbery - mature traditional shrubs, retaining wall, rendered brick steps.

The form of the driveway has been eroded in the past by the new track which leads down to the basement of Swanson Building (Building 1); and the access to the old outdoor Towing Tank. The current boom gate at the Newnham Hall end of the drive is intrusive. The mature trees and shrubs are in reasonable condition and are well maintained. The entrance gates are in good condition. (2002)

==== Precinct B - Home Paddock ====
Together with Newnham Hall's riverside garden, this paddock seems to have made up the riverside portion of Friend's original 47 acre land grant. The home paddock appears to be under cultivation but with a smattering of trees in the c1830s Stephenson's Bend painting.

The home paddock is clearly shown in the 1943 survey and 1945 aerial photo as a single field. In the 1970s low aerial photo it is divided into two narrow fields, one under cultivation and the other possibly used for sheep grazing. The paddock may have been used by the Newnham Community School which had an emphasis on agricultural science in its curriculum.

A line of shallow cut and fill runs across the Paddock about halfway down. This could relate to a former farm road as evidenced by the old hardwood gatepost with gate hinge on the SE hedgerow of the boundary.

The enclosure of this field by hedgerows has been gradually eroded. It also appears that a Hawthorn hedgerow once gave clear definition between the paddock and the entrance driveway. (2002)

==== Precinct C - Riverside Garden ====
In the c. 1840 Stephenson's Bend painting, a lawn appears in front of Friend's two-storey, three-bay Georgian villa with immature hedges at its boundaries and a scattering of trees. The boundaries of the garden are similar to those of today. A signal staff is at the bottom of the garden.

After 1835 the garden underwent a fairly intensive landscape regime in the Gardenesque style, and this is likely to have occurred as a consequence of the house receiving the major riverfront addition in the 1840/50s although it may be possible that Grubb built up the more intensely planted garden following his purchase in 1857.

The 1943 survey notes a garden and shrubbery in this area and the1945 aerial photo showed the upper portion of the riverside garden was still intensely planted with a variety of shrubs in a Victorian manner. By the 1978 survey, gardens and shrubberies had been replaced with lawn.

Elements of the riverside garden include mature heritage plantings and garden bed at edge of Hall forecourt; hedgerows along riverside boundary flagstaff; arbour and steps. The current steel flagstaff, donated to the AMC in 1996, is on the centre-line of Newnham Hall and interprets the flagstaff in a c. 1840 Stephenson's Bend painting.

Now mainly only the larger trees remain, however it is likely that there is some archaeological evidence of former pathways, shrubberies and garden beds. (2002)

==== Precinct D - Orchard ====
Elements of the orchard include remnants of the early orchard - apple and pear trees; other mature fruit and exotic trees; 1940s BBQ; Master of Residences House and Garden 1990; native hedge.

The regular planting of the orchard has been eroded over the years, most notably by the construction of the Master of Residence's House in 1990. While this house and its landscaping may be considered intrusive, the house is of a simple design well screened from the Avenue and the Orchard. (2002)

==== Precinct E - Former Vegetable Garden ====
It is likely that a kitchen garden was established at an early date taking advantage of a northerly aspect sheltered from the south by Newnham Hall and its rear outbuildings and Stableyard. The former vegetable garden site measures about 50x50 metres or 2500 square metres.

The vegetable garden was adjacent to a cistern or large reservoir filled in c1959 with the demolition of the Newnham Hall kitchen. As part of the Community School, Newnham Hall was known for growing its own vegetables and the outline of the vegetable garden on the 1978 survey probably dates from that period.

Elements of the vegetable garden site include a NE Hawthorn Hedgerow; lawn; Newnham Hall road access.

There is no above ground evidence of the vegetable garden but the associated Hawthorn hedge to the NE is in good condition. (2002)

==== Precinct F - Riverside Cottage Avenue ====
This roadway originally led down to the riverside and possibly on to the Jetty (demolished) established by Captain Friend. The remnants of the existing plantings probably date to the 1840/50s.

Elements of the Riverside Cottage Avenue include the Hawthorn hedge and trees; large deciduous (elms, oak) and Eucalyptus trees and stumps of a large trees.

The avenue plantings have been severely eroded by tree removal. The Hawthorn hedges down the south east boundary of the avenue, between the avenue and the orchard, are reasonably intact. (2002)

==== Precincts G 1 and G2 - Sports Field and Paddock to front of Building 1 ====
From the mid 1800s until the mid 1900s Newnham Hall was situated in a typical colonial Tasmanian rural landscape, complete with views to the River and distant hills. Subsequent use of the Newnham Hall and Estate as a hostel; a school; and now as the AMC have retained open areas - the area now used as the Sports Field, the Paddock to front of Building 1. These open spaces help maintain the sense of and help interpret the rural undeveloped landscape.

Elements within these open areas include Hawthorn hedges along early field boundary lines; native shrub and Eucalypt plantings; a 1998 memorial garden for a Japanese student including a sundial and cherry tree plantings partly on the adjacent University of Adelaide land, a mature (1880s) radiata pine on the highway embankment, deciduous trees and communal gardens in the courtyards near the stableyards.

The Sports Field is well maintained with remnant hedgerow plantings defining the early field boundaries. Remnant plantings including a significant eucalypt remain in the paddock to the front of Building 1. (2002)

==== Precinct H - Newnham Hall and Outbuildings ====
The Hall has undergone four principal periods of change. The initial period when the Friend c. 1835 two storey Georgian house with four principal rooms on each floor was commenced. The verandah with convex striped roof to riverfront, separate kitchen and other outbuildings to the rear probably date from this period.

The second period, c1840/50s, was when two-storey riverfront wing with grand Victorian interior decoration was constructed. At some stage a patent water closet was attached to the upper floor. The Stableyard and extensive landscaping also date from this period.

There appears to have been little structural change to the house prior to the third period, the creation of the Newnham Hostel for Girls in 1946. The building probably stood empty from 1939 to 1946 during which time its condition, and that of the outbuildings, severely deteriorated.

The Hostel period was marked by unsympathetic changes to the Hall including the demolition of the kitchen and the outbuilding on the other side of the rear kitchen courtyard, together with the kitchen courtyard walls. The adaptation for a hostel included numerous rear timber additions.

The fourth period involved adaptation for use by AMC from 1979 including extensive conservation works as recommended in the Howroyd and Forward Conservation Reports of 1977. This period includes the c. 1986 adaptive works such as the creation of the three upper floor flats each complete with kitchen, bathroom and laundry facilities and continuing efforts to solve rising damp and structural movement issues.

The Newnham Hall residence and symmetrical stables and yard behind are the historical centre piece of the Newnham Park and property generally. Nineteenth century illustrations suggest a picturesque composition of a grand residence within a park like setting.

Newnham Hall is a two-storied stuccoed brick Georgian house with hipped roof, projecting eaves and pedimented gable-end in the main facade. It also has a single storey verandah on two sides and a lower two storey wing on its eastern side. Upper level windows are twelve pane double hung. At the lower level are French doors with transom lights. Other elements of Newnham Hall precinct include the Riverfront Forecourt; Planting Bed; Wisteria Hedge; Magnolia Tree; Peach Tree; Driveway; Courtyard Planting; Former Kitchen Wing Archaeological Site; Outbuilding Archaeological Site.

Newnham Hall is generally in sound structural condition. There are ongoing wall cracking problems which are a maintenance issue rather than a real structural threat.

All the internal ground flooring was replaced as part of the 1979 adaptation and conservation works and a gravel topped surrounding agricultural drain was created around the perimeter of the building at this time with the exception of the concrete verandah. In 1984 damp and associated damage to wall finishes was a problem with the building and the subject of a report by Peter Spratt and Associates. The building has all modern services including fire detection, security services and ducted air conditioning and disabled access to the ground floor areas. (2002)

==== Precinct I - The Stableyard ====
The Stableyard dates from the second period of development of the Newnham Estate c. 1840s-50s. In 1855, Newnham Hall Stableyard was described the outbuildings as built of brick, and comprise a 12-stall stable, coach and gig houses, harness room, three kitchens, servant's rooms, large store with plenty of dry cellarage. The buildings are brick Georgian style utilitarian buildings and face a U-shaped courtyard.

The main Stable building (two-storied) has the date 1847 inscribed in a stone plaque in the gable end in the center of its principal facade. The two single storey wings are likely to be older than this, probably 1834-1847. These wings were definitely extensions to the now demolished kitchen wing buildings which were immediately adjacent to the rear of Newnham Hall.

The Stableyard complex was adapted for AMC use c. 1980 at which time various works were carried out including walls with new openings constructed to open shed areas; new windows inserted in existing walls; and new colonnades added down each of the single storey wings. In the following decade covered ways were attached to the outside of the complex to giving all weather external access between the Stableyard and adjacent modern AMC Buildings. Roofs are plain galvanised steel; walls are a combination of face brick and roughcast.

The Ponrabbel engine, located to the SE of the main Stableyard building, is one of two steam engines from the Ponrabbel 2 dredge which cleared the River Tamar for about 40 years from the 1920s. The dredge went out of service in 1975.

The Stableyard was in a fairly bad state of repair when the AMC inherited the site in 1977. The Stableyard complex was adapted for AMC use c. 1980 at which time various works to walls and windows were carried out and colonnades and covered ways added. Use by the AMC ensures heritage fabric is conserved with little demand for further change. (2002)

==== Precinct J - Riverside (Gardener's) Cottage ====
Although various buildings and a jetty are shown on an 1833 survey, the Riverside Cottage is not shown. The 1835 advertisement mentions a gardener's lodge and a boat house and wharf. It is possible the 1835 gardener's lodge is the cottage which was demolished. The Riverside Cottage is more than likely to be derived from a pattern book of farm buildings, built at the same time as the two-storey rear wing to the front of Newnham Hall (1840/50s). Such 'pattern book' outbuildings from the 1840/50s occur at many estates in Northern Tasmania such as Woolmers (RR 012791), Entally (RR 012960) and Clarendon (RR 012752).

This cottage appears on the 1943 survey including the rear wing but with no outbuildings. The 1945 aerial photograph shows a tall thick hedge to the southeast. Elements of the Riverside Cottage include a picket fence, front and side gardens, rear and courtyard gardens; cypress hedge, large trees, shrubs and hedges, hedgerow remnants.

The Riverside Cottage Avenue road now leads straight into the rear yard of the cottage although it once continued on past the cottage down to the Tamar River and the Jetty. The rear yard has hedges and tall trees. The front garden of the cottage originally extended down to the survey boundary/hedge line represented by the remnant hedge plantings. The cottage was once quite conspicuous from the river and also had fine river views. The original three-roomed cottage has a service wing. A narrow verandah appears to have run down the NE elevation of the cottage. In 1983 an extension was added which created a U-shaped courtyard facing NW.

The cottage is in reasonably sound condition. There are ongoing problems with wall cracking a few damp problems. The cottage has all modern services including fire detection and ducted air conditioning. (2002)

==== Precinct K - Farm Shed Archaeological Site ====
A woolshed which appears on the 1943 survey may have existed in this precinct from the mid-19th century. A 1922 Illustrated Tasmanian Mail article describes a new and up-to-date milking shed as being erected, and the latest milk cooling devices being installed. This shed was erected to meet the needs of the newly formed Newnham Stud Company, which was to specialise in Jersey cows.

In the 1943 survey and the 1945 aerial photo both the wool shed and a milking shed are shown. The milking shed and woolshed are separated by a Hawthorn Hedge along the respective paddock boundaries. A silo is also shown to the NE of the milking shed. By 1978, the shearing shed had been demolished and a fibro fowl house erected. The milking shed had also been modified and adapted as a shearing shed. These works were carried out by the Newnham Community School which had agricultural activities as part of its core curriculum. Today only the milking shed remains, although in a much modified form as the groundsman's shed (Building 12). The area where the woolshed (and later a fowl house) existed is now covered by Maritime Way and the bitumen carpark and associated landscaping behind Building 8.

Only the left-hand single-storey section of the groundsman's shed is reminiscent of the 1922 milking shed. The large Oak and Eucalypt trees may be remnants of the mid-19th-century park planting and landscape.

The remaining former milking shed fabric has the potential to yield information about agricultural technology from c. 1922 to c. 1977. There is the possibility of significant archaeological remains of the former woolshed (c. 1850), and fowl house (c. 1945) and of fences, hedges and other agricultural features connected with the above farm buildings.

The former milking shed has been altered and has lost much of its significance. This precinct generally has research potential because of the information that can be gained from an analysis of the remaining former milking shed fabric about agricultural technology from c. 1922 to c. 1977. The precinct also has archaeological remains of the former woolshed (c. 1850), and fowl house (c. 1945), fences, hedges and other agricultural features connected with the above farm buildings. (2002)

=== Demolished elements ===
==== The Newnham Hall Park ====
Like many estates, Newnham Hall had a park, where livestock could graze in the shade of evergreen trees, adjacent to the main homestead area. In Australia such parks helped to create a British Arcadian aesthetic. The Riverside Cottage served as a lodge for arrivals by the Tamar River and it is possible this was the principal means of arrival into the late 1800s. The Newnham Hall Park probably dated from the 1840/50s along with the curved driveway and the intensely planted Riverside Garden. There are currently no remnants of the Park extant but a few of the driveway trees remain lining the main entrance to the University from Invermay Road (previously the George Town Road).

==== The Early Cottage or Lodge ====
This cottage was probably one of the first buildings on the Newnham Estate and could have been the home that Captain Friend and family lived in from 1832 while awaiting completion of the first section of the grander Newnham Hall in 1836. A 1977 drawing shows a traditional four room cottage with its principal (NW) elevation facing the drive down to the riverside. This orientation suggests that it was an early cottage addressing the road up from the jetty on the Tamar River. The building was demolished to make way for future development, probably in 1979 during works to convert the stableyard complex. Building 8 (Survival Centre) now stands on the site of the cottage.

==== The Newnham Hall Jetty ====
The 1833 survey showed the location of a jetty. The exact position of the jetty is not known, however a jetty certainly existed from an early date as the river was Friend's primary means of travel between Newnham and Launceston and George Town, Friend being Port Officer at both places at one time. Reference is made to a boat house and jetty in the 1835 advertisement.

== Heritage listing ==
The Newnham Estate, now the Australian Maritime College (AMC), Newnham Campus, Launceston, demonstrates significant phases of the evolution of European settlement in Launceston, Tasmania and Australia.

The Newnham Estate demonstrates the evolution of a large rural estate in Northern Tasmania, from its establishment on the banks of the Tamar River close to Launceston in the 1830s, through a period of prosperity and improvement in the 1840s and 50s, to modernisation and diversification of agricultural practices in the early 1920s.

Significant development and cultural phases of the area and the estate include over 100 years of continuous pastoral settlement and development from 1822, use as a Government institutional residence, Newnham Hall Hostel from 1945, the Newnham Community School and the Brooks High School from 1948 to the 1970s and the Australian Maritime College from 1979 to the present.

Newnham Hall, the Stableyards, the Riverside Cottage, the alignment of paddock plantings, the orchard and the vegetable garden, roads such as the Riverside Cottage Avenue and the entrance driveway, significant trees and plantings and the unoccupied agricultural spaces are significant as heritage precincts and historic elements within a cultural landscape.

The AMC is significant for its association with the expansion and development of the city of Launceston and for the adaptive re-use of a pastoral estate as government residential and educational institutions. The gradual diminution of the Newnham property, from its peak area of 1200 acres, to its current AMC curtilage is demonstrative both of densification and settlement pressures from the nearby city of Launceston; and of the need for civic and educational institutions to be closely linked to urban centres. The agricultural use of the estate continued alongside the reduction in size of the property and the use of the buildings for government institutions.

The AMC, Newnham Campus, is significant as the main one of two campuses of the national institution established to train and educate people for the Australian maritime industries. The establishment of AMC was part of a Federal Government initiative to relocate scientific and ocean based research activities to Tasmania in the late 1970s.

Newnham Hall, together with the Stableyard, Riverside Cottage and remnant landscape features are good representative examples of elements of a mid Victorian agricultural estate in Northern Tasmania. The Hall, in its original Colonial Georgian form (Friend period) is one of a significant group of two-storied Georgian residences in Tasmania. The extraordinarily rich architectural decoration of the Newnham Hall (Cameron period), although altered, is a rare and uncommon aspect of Tasmania's Colonial architecture heritage.

The Newnham Hall Stableyard is an example of compact complex of utilitarian outbuildings immediately adjacent to the Hall and is notable for its symmetry along an axis aligned with Newnham Hall. The Stableyard is an important element of Newnham Estate as a substantial mid nineteenth century agricultural complex.

The Riverside Cottage is a representative example of a c. 1850 'pattern book' picturesque building designed and sited to enhance the romantic qualities of the substantial mid nineteenth century pastoral estate.

The adaptation of the core of the Newnham Estate for educational purposes from 1945 until the present is of significance, including the evolving heritage conservation methods of the late 1970s and early 1980s that recognised, and sought to enhance, the heritage values of the property.

The Riverside Garden layout, remnant built landscape features, the orchard and vegetable garden, the working courtyards and associated demolished buildings adjacent to Newnham Hall and the form of larger farm structures such as the wool shed may yield important information about nineteenth and early twentieth century rural estate agricultural practices, cultural material and social conditions. Beyond the immediate precinct, the site of the Newnham Hall Jetty on the Tamar River which dated from the 1830s also has archaeological potential.

The Newnham Estate, in particular the placement of Newnham Hall and the Riverside Cottage and Riverside Cottage Avenue, and the alignment of boundaries and plantings, are visually linked to the Tamar River. The pastoral landscape, views and open spaces, are of enduring value and aesthetic significance.

The proportions and siting of the Newnham Hall reflect the original intention that the estate be viewed and approached from the Tamar River. Other significant views from Newnham Hall and adjacent areas extend over a landfall to the Tamar River and to the landscape beyond.

Internal views within and between historical elements of the Newnham Estate are aesthetically significant and reinforce the spatial relationships between architectural and landscape elements.

The heritage precincts of Newnham Hall demonstrate the aesthetic and technical improvements made to a colonial estate in the 1840s and 50s including the construction of the riverside front to the Hall complete with a rich interior decoration to the principal rooms; the sweeping entrance driveway; the landscaped gardens; the provision of a compact but picturesque Riverside Cottage and The Early Cottage or Lodge (demolished); and the functionally designed stableyard and associated yards and equipment designed on the central axis of the Hall.

The location of the Newnham Estate and in particular, Newnham Hall and the associated Tamar River vistas demonstrate the social standing of the occupants. The complex of farm buildings and residences, both extant and removed including the Park and the Newnham Jetty, demonstrate the scale of the agricultural activities and the cultural achievements and aspirations of the owners.

The Newnham Hall complex has long been appreciated by the Launceston community as a site with cultural heritage values. This is demonstrated by the late 1930s efforts by the Queen Victoria Museum and Art Gallery for its preservation and recording; community interest in the major heritage conservation program of the 1970s and 80s; and in the continued community interest in its history and preservation.

As an educational institution the Estate is significant for its associations with the Newnham Hostel for girls attending Launceston High School; the Newnham Community School; the Brooks High School; the Tasmanian College of Advanced Education; and now the Australian Maritime College.

The Newnham Estate has special associations with a number of historical Tasmanian identities including Lt. Matthew Curling Friend, Port Officer and Harbour Master for Launceston and George Town who commenced the first major structures on the site (1832–36); John Cameron, entrepreneur, who probably built the riverside front addition; and William Grubb, a notable northern Tasmanian industrialist and member of the Tasmanian Legislative Council (1869–79), who resided at Newnham Hall from 1857 to his death in 1879.

The Newnham Estate was important for the promotion of the use of Jersey cattle and Suffolk sheep in Tasmania by Mr Tulloch Smith and Peter Keam, who formed the Newnham Stud Company in 1922.
