= Mohamed Juma Al Shamisi =

Emirati businessman

Personal details
- Born: September 1978 (age 48) Abu Dhabi, United Arab Emirates
- Education: University of Tasmania
- Occupation: Managing Director and Group CEO of AD Ports Group

Captain Mohamed Juma Al Shamisi (Arabic: محمد جمعه الشامسي; born September 1978, Abu Dhabi) is the Group CEO of AD Ports Group, and a businessperson involved in ports within the emirate of Abu Dhabi.

He joined Abu Dhabi Ports in 2008. Al Shamisi is a board member of Etihad Airways.

== Education ==
Al Shamisi holds an MBA, an advanced Diploma of Applied Science (shipmaster) and a Graduate Certificate of Management MBA and Graduate Certificate of Management from the University of Tasmania, Australia. He is a qualified Master Mariner having attained an Advanced Diploma of Applied Science (Shipmaster) as well as the Peter Morris Prize for his significant contributions to the maritime industry from the Australian Maritime College. Al Shamisi was also awarded the AMC Baird Publication Prize for Best Performance in Navigation Studies and is also the recipient of the Sheikh Rashid Award for Academic Excellence.
