= Halat al Bahrani =

Coordinates: 24°23′N 54°14′E

Halat al Bahrani is a small Emirati island near Abu Dhabi.
