= Dongah =

Dongah دنگاه
- Village
- Location within Iran
- Coordinates: 38°43′40″N 46°43′23″E
- Country: Iran
- Province: East Azerbaijan
- County: Varzaqan
- Bakhsh: Central
- Rural District: Bakrabad

Population (2006)
  - Total: 23
- Time zone: UTC+3:30 (IRST)
  - Summer (DST): UTC+4:30 (IRDT)

Dongah (Persian: دنگاه, also Romanized as Dongāh and Dangah; also known as Dūngāh, Dungāi, and Dyungyan) is a village in Bakrabad Rural District, in the Central District of Varzaqan County, East Azerbaijan Province, Iran. At the 2006 census, its population was 23, in 6 families.
