= Al Aryam Island =

Island in United Arab Emirates

Native name: الاريام
- Location within United Arab Emirates

Geography
- Location: Persian Gulf
- Coordinates: 24°18′37.6″N 54°13′41.3″E

Administration
- United Arab Emirates
- Emirate: Emirate of Abu Dhabi

Al Aryam Island (Arabic: جزيرة الاريام) is an island in the Persian Gulf off the west coast of Abu Dhabi in the United Arab Emirates. It was formerly known as Bu Khushaishah. The island is few kilometers away from Abu Dhabi and is connected to the mainland through a bridge.

== Archaeology ==
Ubaid pottery has been recorded on Al Aryam Island, as well as on the nearby islands of Dalma and Marawah, evidence of contact during the Neolithic with southern Mesopotamia – or with traders in the central Gulf who were themselves in contact with Ubaid communities. The island is among the many sites documented by the Abu Dhabi Islands Archaeological Survey (ADIAS), established in 1992 to record and, where appropriate, excavate archaeological sites along the coast and islands of Abu Dhabi.
