= Khalifa Economic Zones Abu Dhabi =

Khalifa Economic Zones Abu Dhabi - KEZAD Group مناطق خليفة الاقتصادية أبوظبي – مجموعة كيزاد
- Integrated trade, logistics and industrial zones
- Location in the UAE
- Coordinates: 24°43′N 54°51′E
- Country: United Arab Emirates
- Emirate: Abu Dhabi

Area
  - Total: 550 km^{2} (210 sq mi)

KEZAD or Khalifa Economic Zones Abu Dhabi - KEZAD Group (Arabic: مناطق خليفة الاقتصادية أبوظبي – مجموعة كيزاد, romanized: Madīnat Khalīfah Al-Iqtesā'diyah Abu Dhabi - Majmoua Kezad) is an integrated trade, logistics, and industrial zone launched by AD Ports Group on September 19, 2022. It was established to consolidate and expand Abu Dhabi's Economic Cities and Free Zones offering.

== Background ==
As part of Abu Dhabi's economic diversification plans for 2030, the government initiated the development of a multibillion-dollar industrial park and port operation on a greenfield site in Taweelah, adjacent to the newly constructed Khalifa Port. This site became the emirate's first industrial free zone allowing 100 per cent foreign ownership. By 2030, KEZAD is expected to contribute up to 15% of Abu Dhabi's non-oil GDP.

== Location ==
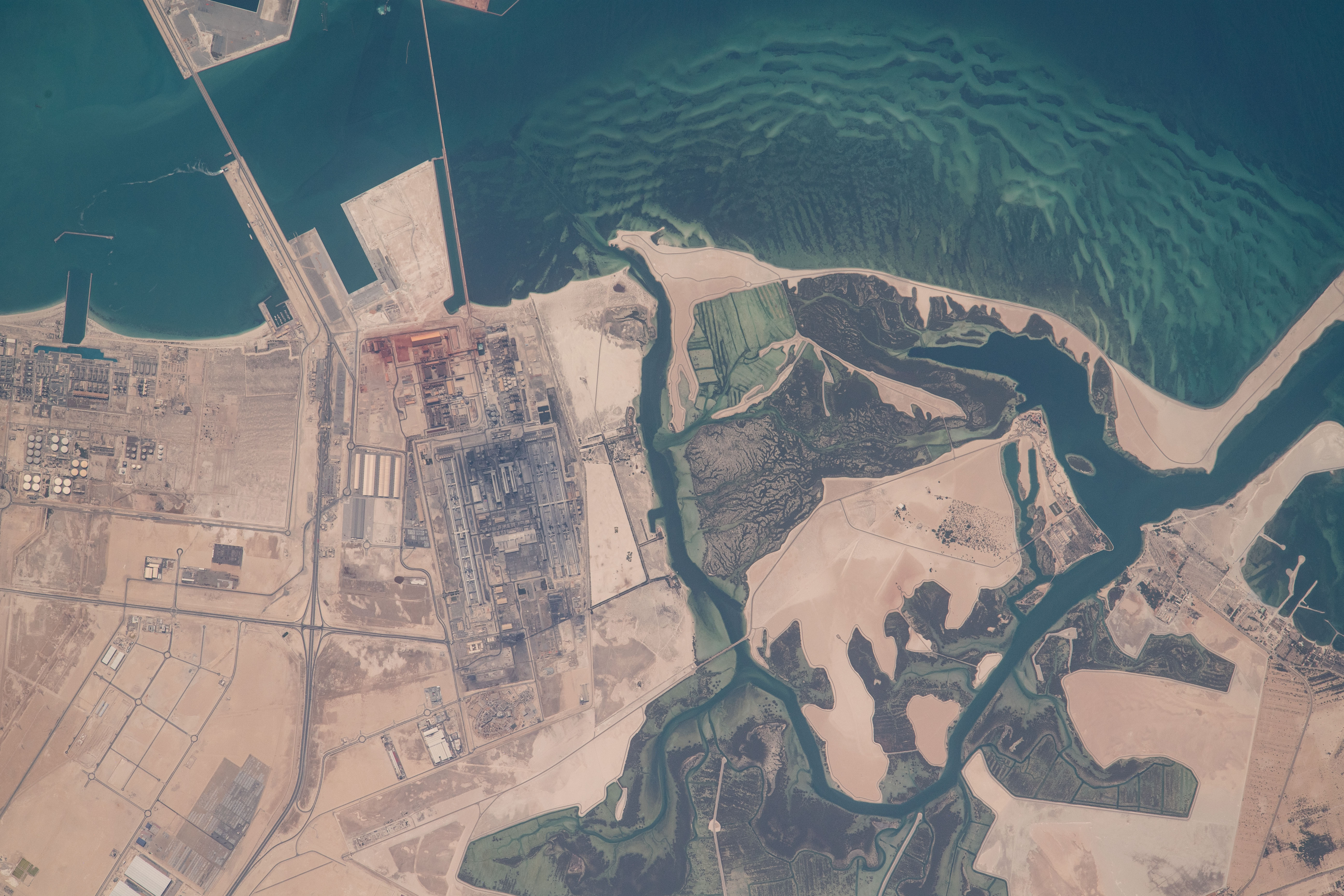
Industrial zone and wetlands, coast of Persian Gulf

KEZAD is strategically located near Khalifa Port, approximately equidistant from Abu Dhabi and Dubai, with extended frontage along the E11 Highway connecting the two cities. Plans include an arterial roadway linking KEZAD to Al Ain, the UAE's largest inland city. The zone is also connected to three major international airports: Abu Dhabi International Airport (35 km (22 miles)), Al Maktoum International Airport (52 km (32 miles)), and Dubai International Airport (85 km (53 miles)).

KEZAD's intermodal infrastructure links sea, air, road, and rail transport, providing investors with efficient access to over 4.5 billion consumers across four time zones.

== KIZAD Logistics Park ==
The KIZAD Logistics Park (KLP) provides firms with high-spec pre-built warehouses covering 1.3 million square feet for logistics operations.

== Investors ==
KEZAD's anchor investor, Emirates Aluminium (EMAL), which aims to be one of the world's largest single-site aluminium smelters, began operations in 2009. EMAL currently produces 800,000 tons of aluminium at KEZAD, with phase two expected to increase production to 1.3 million tons.

By late 2013, over 50 local and international companies had signed long-term leases at KEZAD, contributing to an estimated creation of more than 150,000 jobs. Investors included Bauer, KSB, Al Braik Investments LLC, Palletco, Brasil Foods (BRF), City Pharmacy, and Emirates Calcium Carbonate Factory.

== See also ==
- Musaffah Port, the dedicated port for Abu Dhabi's Musaffah Industrial Zone
- Zayed Port, the port of Abu Dhabi City
