= Mussafah =

Musaffah مُصَفَّح Musaffah Muṣaffah Aṣ-Ṣanāʿiyah (مُصّفَّح ٱلصّنَاعِيَة)
- Industrial city
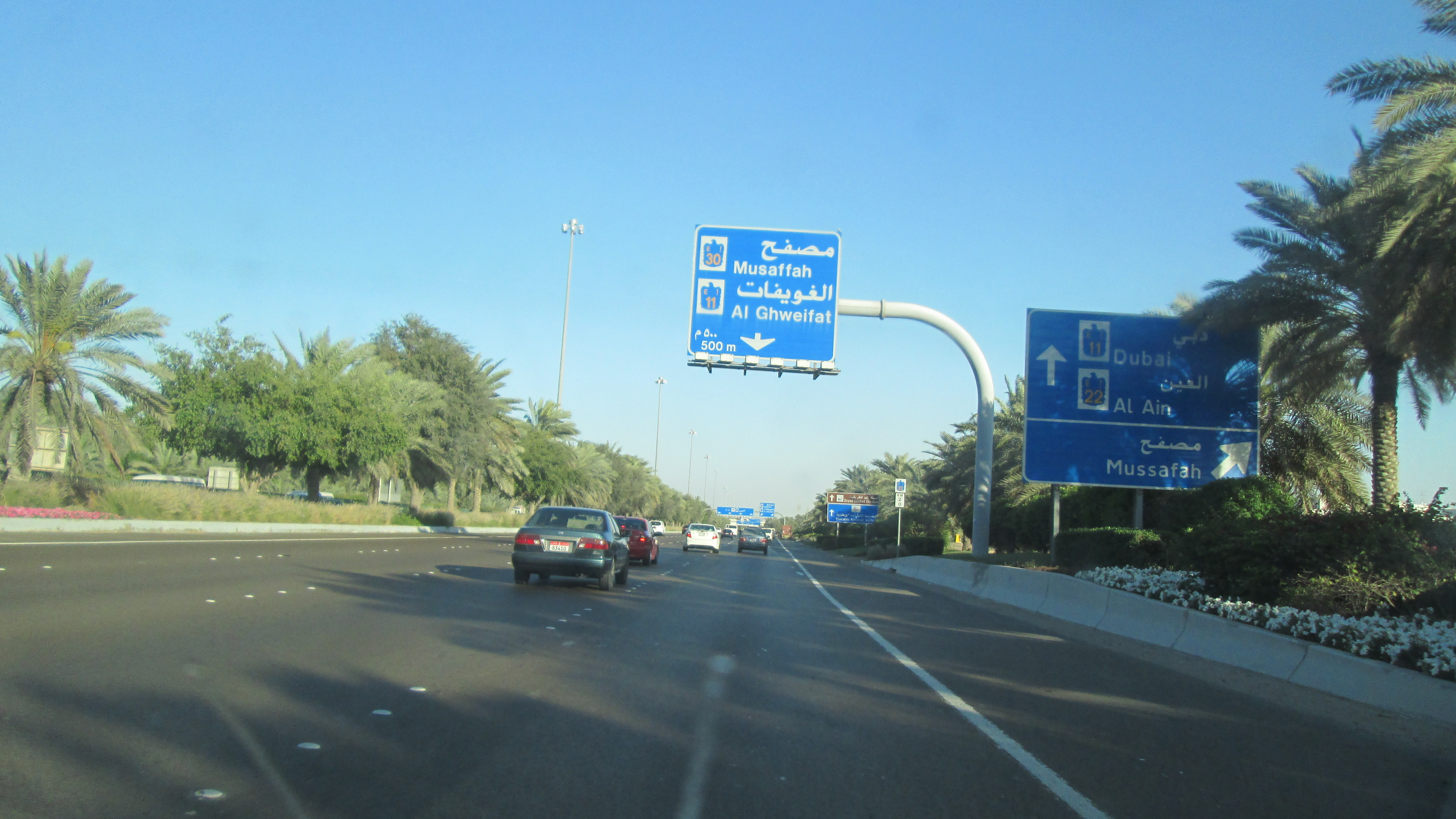
- The E30 highway from Abu Dhabi City to Al Ain City, going through Musaffah

- Location in the UAE Musaffah (Middle East) Musaffah (Asia)
- Coordinates: 24°20′N 54°31′E
- Country: United Arab Emirates
- Emirate: Abu Dhabi
- Municipal region: Abu Dhabi Region

Government
  - Type: Monarchy
  - Ruler: Mohamed bin Zayed Al Nahyan
  - Crown Prince: Khaled bin Mohamed Al Nahyan
- Time zone: UTC+4 (UAE standard time)

Muṣaffah (Arabic: مُصَفَّح) or Musaffah is an industrial district to the southwest of Abu Dhabi, the United Arab Emirates. Also known as Muṣaffah Aṣ-Ṣanāʿiyah (Arabic: مُصّفَّح ٱلصّنَاعِيَة), it is one of the most important economic areas of the United Arab Emirates and has been designated a special economic zone, with numerous factories and port.

== History ==
Musaffah was a small industrial area in the 1970s. A 1980 MEED report described it as "a maze of roads and half-completed buildings" where industrial operations principally comprised workshops, service and maintenance facilities. The report stated that a pipe plant proposal in the area had strong local backing. Growth was facilitated by the building of the 480 metres (1,570 ft) Musaffah Bridge, a six-lane bridge which was built between 1976 and 1978, connecting the island of Abu Dhabi to the main land, following investment by the Korean company Dongah. An engineering assessment of the bridge in 1994 revealed that the concrete in the bridge was not sustainable and was beyond repair. As a result, the bridge underwent much restoration work in the 1990s, and generating new interest in developing Musaffah as an industrial centre. In 1996, the Abu Dhabi Seaports Authority announced a Dh2.4 billion development plan of the area, including the building of a new port in Musaffah. In 1998, many medium-rise buildings, mostly for offices, were proposed, and a local police station was built.

The government began offering incentives to businesses to operate in Musaffah, offering them zone services including exemption from customs on imported good, land, and industrial licenses. Musaffah is now the site for the "Abu Dhabi Industrial City", a special economic zone. As a result, the economic development of the area boomed in the 2000s, facilitated by its own port on the northern side. Hydrocarbons-intensive industries have been one of the major areas of growth. By January 2009, about 30% of the land in the Polymer Park vicinity had been let out. It was estimated that by 2012, the area would be about 60% utilised, exceeding $27 million in investment. A Bonar Emirates Technical Yarns factory, run by both ADBIC and Low & Bonar in conjunction, was established in April 2008 and manufactures industrial grass yarn.

Abu Dhabi Drilling Chemicals and Products Ltd (ADDCAP), a fully owned subsidiary of ADNOC, began operating in Musaffah in 2007. Ducab began operating in 2008 from a new plant in Musaffah where they have sought to increase their production capacity of low- and medium-voltage cables from 65,000 cubic tons to 110,000 cubic tons per year. Their other plant is in Jebel Ali.

In 2011, Abu Dhabi Urban Planning Council (UPC) officially handed over the landmark 53-kilometre long Musaffah Channel project to Abu Dhabi Ports Company (ADPC) for operational use. The development of the $411 million (AED1.5 billion) deepwater Musaffah Port and Musaffah Channel included a new general cargo terminal at the northwest corner of the Musaffah Industrial Area, as well as an extensive waterfront occupied by numerous private berths and terminals. Musaffah Shabiya is a fast-growing residential area with apartments and villas.

== Geography ==
Musaffah is located in the central region of the Emirate, situated some 20 km (12 miles) south-east of the centre of Abu Dhabi City, and thus is a satellite town. On the eastern side is Mohammed Bin Zayed City and to the south is ICAD II and Al Maqatrah. The E30 road passes on its eastern side, between Musaffah and Mohammed Bin Zayed City. A road and rail system exists between Musaffah and Taweelah.

88 towers exist on either side of the 3.5 kilometres (2.2 mi) section of highway between the Musaffah Bridge and the highway interchange for the industrial estate. The bridge has two identical components which comprise, in addition to a carriageway, a foot-way 2 metres (6 ft 7 in) in width. Musaffah's aesthetic qualities have been criticised by many. One author said that the "semi-industrial areas like Musaffah have morphed into grimy shanty-towns for thousands. The cramped, dirty quarters are hot, pungent and a long way from the smart, iridescent blocks of the city."

The port facility provides for cargo operations and warehousing for a wide range of clients. A new tunnel of 280 m (920 ft) length links the airport with Musaffah. The Musaffah Channel is a man-made canal, with gypsum crystals described as large and bladed. The banks at the eastern end of the Musaffah Channel reportedly have "Pleistocene reworked dune deposits, unconformably overlain by Holocene carbonates and sabkha evaporates." The channel's inner reaches are situated approximately 7 kilometres (4.3 mi) inland from the location of the present-day lagoon. The port has a 342 metres (1,122 ft) long main quay and two 40 metres (130 ft) long side quays and covers an area of 37,500 square metres (404,000 sq ft). The depth of draft is 11 metres (36 ft) at the port and is linked with the new Musaffah Channel (a channel dredged 9 metres (30 ft) below the datum) which is about 53 kilometres (33 mi) in length.

== Municipal administration ==
The municipal administration area of Musaffah has a population of about 151,000 and its jurisdiction includes Musaffah Industrial Area, northern coastal zone, labour camps, commercial centre of Khalifa, new industrial centre, residential and commercial areas of Mohammed Bin Zayed, also residential areas of Khalifa City.

== Houthi attacks on Mussafah ==
In January 2022, a group of Houthis blew up three ADNOC trucks in Mussafah and some infrastructure at the international airport.

== See also ==
- Al Wathba, Abu Dhabi
