= Al Samha =

Al Samha is a town in the emirate of Abu Dhabi in the United Arab Emirates. The population is under 2000. The UAE owns an oil tanker named after the town. There is a hospital in Al Samha that provides medical services to the area.
