= AD Ports Group =

UAE ports, industrial zones, and logistics operator

Coordinates: 24°30′53.20″N 54°22′56.89″E

- Native name: مجموعة موانئ أبوظبي
- Type: Public
- Traded as: ADPORTS
- Industry: Ports; Maritime; Logistics; Industrial Zones; Economic Zones; Free Zones
- Founded: 2006; 20 years ago
- Headquarters: Abu Dhabi, United Arab Emirates
- Area served: Worldwide
- Key people: Mohamed Juma Al Shamisi (managing director and group CEO)
- Products: Digital, Economic Cities & Free Zones, Logistics, Maritime, Ports
- Revenue: AED 5.498 Bn (2022)
- Operating income: AED 1.670 Bn (2022)
- Net income: AED 1.284 Bn (2022)
- Total assets: AED 38.512 Bn (2022)
- Number of employees: 4,061 (Full Time Employees as of end of 2022)
- Subsidiaries: Maqta Gateway, KEZAD Group, KEZAD Communities, AD Ports Logistics, Noatum, Abu Dhabi Maritime Academy, Abu Dhabi Maritime, OFCO, SAFEEN, Abu Dhabi Ports, Fujairah Terminals, Abu Dhabi Cruise Terminal, SAFEEN Feeders, Divetech Marine Engineering
- Website: www.adportsgroup.com

AD Ports Group (Arabic: مجموعة موانئ أبوظبي; formerly Abu Dhabi Ports Company and ADPC) is the exclusive developer and regulator of ports and related infrastructure in Abu Dhabi.

== History ==
Abu Dhabi Ports PJSC was established by Emiri Decree in 2006. In 2021 AD Ports Group was established bringing together all subsidiaries as an integrated business across five clusters – Digital, Economic Cities & Free Zones, Logistics, Maritime and Ports.

AD Ports Group was publicly listed on 8 February 2022 (Ticker: ADPORTS on Abu Dhabi Securities Exchange (ADX)). Abu Dhabi Developmental Holding Company (ADQ) is the majority shareholder.

AD Ports Group was ranked 49th on Forbes Middle East's Top 100 Listed Companies list.

== Subsidiaries/Associated Companies ==
AD Ports Group has five integrated business clusters Digital, Economic Cities & Free Zones, Logistics, Maritime and Ports. Under the supervision of Abu Dhabi's Department of Economic Development, Maqta Gateway have developed and operates the Advanced Trade and Logistics Platform (ATLP) designed to unify trade and logistics services across Abu Dhabi, including sea, land, air, and industrial and free zones.

The Economic Cities & Free Zones Cluster oversees the operations of KEZAD Group the largest integrated trade, logistics and industrial hub in the region. The Cluster provides a hub for manufacturing, logistics and trade with more than 550 km^{2} of land including 100 km^{2} designated as Free Zone. In 2021, KEZAD Group Communities was established as an employee accommodation provider.

AD Ports Group acquired MICCO Logistics in 2020 to bolster its logistics capabilities and service offerings. In 2023, the Group acquired Noatum, a leading multinational provider in transport, comprehensive logistics, and port operations services, to operate its Logistics Cluster. MICCO Logistics was subsequently integrated into the Middle East division of Noatum Logistics, a global integrated supply chain services provider.

The Ports Cluster owns and operates 10 terminals and ports in the UAE. The Ports Cluster has local and global partnerships including with ADNOC, COSCO Shipping Ports, CMA CGM Group, Mediterranean Shipping Company (MSC) and Autoterminal Barcelona.

The Maritime Cluster provides maritime services through SAFEEN including pilotage, bunkering, harbour tugs and towing, Vessel Traffic Services (VTS), transshipment, offshore and onshore logistics and support. Specialised offshore services are catered for by OFCO and a feedering service through SAFEEN Feeders. Also within the cluster, Abu Dhabi Maritime governs and regulates Abu Dhabi's waters ensuring the implementation of maritime health and safety and maritime education and training for professionals and graduates is provided by Abu Dhabi Maritime Academy.

=== Expansion ===
In 2023 and 2024, AD Ports Group expanded to South Asia with the signing of major concession agreements with Pakistan to operate deep-sea terminals at the Port of Karachi. The concessions cover the operation of a container terminal under a 50-year term and a bulk and general cargo terminal under a 25-year term extendable to an equal term. The concessions grant a continuous quay length of about 2300 meters on the East Wharf of the Port of Karachi. The container terminal is operated by Karachi Gateway Terminal at berths 6-10. The bulk and general cargo terminal is operated by Karachi Gateway Terminal Multipurpose at berths 11-17. Both the operators being majority owned subsidiaries of AD Ports Group.
