= The Big Brain Theory =

American reality television show aired in 2013

- Genre: Reality
- Presented by: Kal Penn
- Judges: Mark Fuller & Christine Gulbranson
- Country of origin: United States
- Original language: English
- No. of seasons: 1
- No. of episodes: 8

Production
- Running time: 45 min.
- Production company: Pilgrim Studios

Original release
- Network: Discovery Channel
- Release: May 1 – June 19, 2013

The Big Brain Theory is an American television show on the Discovery Channel that first aired in 2013, hosted by Kal Penn. Eight episodes were produced.

== Format ==
Each week the contestants enter the blueprint challenge, where they are given 30 minutes to solve an engineering problem using only an electronic blackboard. The 2 contestants with the best solutions are chosen by the judges to be the leaders of the blue team and the red team, who now have to build a working solution. The team leaders pick their members one by one, and they are given a certain time and budget to finish the task; workshop time is limited to 12 hours a day.

Their builds are then tested and the team that fails will face elimination. If both teams fail then nobody is safe from elimination. The judges will determine who leaves the competition. Once eliminated, one competitor can get back in if he/she wins the wild card, decided by the judges.

The winner of the competition gets US$50,000 and a one-year contract to work for WET Enterprises, founded by Mark Fuller. Contestants who have been eliminated cannot participate in the blueprint challenge any more, but they can still be picked for the teams and are eligible for the Judges' Prize, which is US$20,000.

== Judges ==
In addition to the full judges, there is always a third guest judge that changes every week. The two full judges are:

- Mark Fuller, founder and CEO of WET Enterprises
- Christine Gulbranson, founder and CEO of Christalis

== Overview ==
=== Contestants ===
- Winner: Corey Fleischer, mechanical engineer
- Runner-up: Amy Elliott, engineering grad student
- Judges' Prize: Tom Johnson, mechanical engineer
- Eric Whitman, robotics grad student
- Andrew Stroup, defense systems engineer
- Dan Moyers, space systems engineer
- Gui Cavalcanti, robotics engineer
- Alison Wong, product designer
- Joel Ifill, welding engineer
- Joe Caravella, rocket scientist

Bold denotes team captain.

=== Episodes ===
#	Title	Guest judge	Winner	Eliminated	Original airdate
1	"The Next Great Innovator"	Michael J. Massimino	—	Joe	May 1, 2013
Keep a box full of explosives from blowing up when two trucks collide. Both teams fail.			Red Team: **Amy**, Andrew, Eric, Dan, Corey; Blue Team: **Joe**, Tom, Alison, Gui, Joel		
2	"Seek and Destroy"	Bobak Ferdowsi	Red team	Joel	May 8, 2013
Build a device remote-controlled from a bunker to hit a missile in the air.			Red Team: **Eric**, Corey, Andrew, Dan, Joe; Blue Team: **Gui**, Tom, Joel, Amy, Alison		
3	"Three Little Pigs"	Burt Dalton	Red team	Alison	May 15, 2013
Build a shelter to protect a human life under the most extreme conditions.			Red Team: **Amy**, Corey, Dan, Joe, Gui; Blue Team: **Alison**, Tom, Eric, Andrew, Joel		
4	"Triathlabots"	Jason Bardis	Blue team	Dan	May 22, 2013
Build a robot that can do the 100-yard dash, the javelin throw, and the standing long jump. Bryan Clay demonstrates the 3 athletics events.			Red Team: **Dan**, Gui, Amy, Joel, Alison; Blue Team: **Corey**, Eric, Tom, Andrew, Joe		
5	"Waterfall"	Dezso Molnar	Red team	Gui	May 29, 2013
Harness a waterfall to power an elevator. Dr. Gulbranson is absent from this episode.			Red Team: **Eric**, Corey, Andrew, Alison, Joel; Blue Team: **Gui**, Tom, Amy, Joe, Dan		
6	"The Wild Card"	Brian David Johnson	Blue team	Andrew, Dan	June 5, 2013
Design an automated food delivery system. Dan wins the wild card but gets eliminated again.			Red Team: **Andrew**, Eric, Dan, Alison, Joel; Blue Team: **Amy**, Corey, Tom, Gui, Joe		
7	"Catching Cars"	Carl Edwards	Blue team	Eric, Tom	June 12, 2013
Stop any car that doesn't stop at the checkpoint without injuring the passengers.			Red Team: **Tom**, Eric, Joe, Joel, Dan; Blue Team: **Amy**, Corey, Gui, Alison, Andrew		
8	"Bridge Battle"	Buzz Aldrin	Blue team		June 19, 2013
Build a bridge for a 3400-pound truck to cross.			Red Team: **Amy**, Gui, Eric, Joel, Alison; Blue Team: **Corey**, Tom, Andrew, Joe, Dan		
