= Mark W. Fuller =

- Born: August 3, 1951 (age 75)
- Education: Stanford (MS), 1978; Utah (BS, Civil Engrg), 1976; Highland HS, 1969
- Occupations: engineer, businessman
- Years active: 1978–present
- Known for: President and CEO, WET Design
- Notable work: Fountains of Bellagio; The Dubai Fountain

Mark W. Fuller is a President and CEO of WET, a fountain and water feature design firm in Los Angeles, California.

== Early life and education ==
Fuller was born and raised in Salt Lake City, Utah. While he was in junior high school, he built a small pond in the backyard of his parents' house. Fuller first visited Disneyland when he was fourteen, and was inspired to expand the fish pond with lagoons and underwater tunnels, using an old washing machine pump. He credits that as his first fountain, built with the help of his grandfather and lit by lights using tomato juice cans. He would later recall "Here I was, fooling around with a hundred-and-twenty-volt current, in water, but nobody seemed concerned."

After graduating from Highland High School in 1969, Fuller attended the University of Utah, majoring in civil engineering, which he chose because "it's the broadest [engineering discipline] and gives you a smattering of all the other types". At Utah, Fuller also took an honors program with so many liberal arts classes that it took him an extra year to graduate, in 1976. Fuller nearly obtained a second degree in theater from Utah. He had started attending theater classes to meet actresses, but stayed on to develop stage effects, including an altar that spewed fireballs on command for a production of Agamemnon.

After graduating from Utah, Fuller went on to attend graduate school at Stanford University, where he took several project design courses that gave him "a deep appreciation of form" and worked "blue-collar" jobs during the summers, graduating in 1978. Fuller received an honorary doctorate from the University of Utah in 2015.

== Career ==
As part of his undergraduate thesis in Civil Engineering at the University of Utah, Fuller developed a large-scale laminar flow nozzle with two other seniors that has since been used extensively in WET's water features. The first nozzle was used in a fountain installed in the atrium of The Conquistador, now an apartment building on 3300 South, but which has since been removed.

After graduating from Stanford, Fuller worked as an Imagineer for The Walt Disney Company, applying the laminar flow technology he developed and refined to create Disney's “Leapfrog” fountain feature at Epcot Center. During the push to have the fountain ready for the opening of Epcot, Fuller did not sleep for four days.

It's not at all about the size (of the fountain). It's about seeing people enchanted. [...] I like making people feel more glad to be alive.

— Mark Fuller, 2015 alumni profile, Continuum magazine.

Fuller co-founded WET in 1983 with two other ex-Imagineers, Melanie Simon and Alan Robinson. Their first commission was to create a water feature for Fountain Place, a Dallas skyscraper. The company now holds more than 50 patents and employs over 200 employees of various disciplines — designers, architects, engineers, scientists, cinematographers and others.

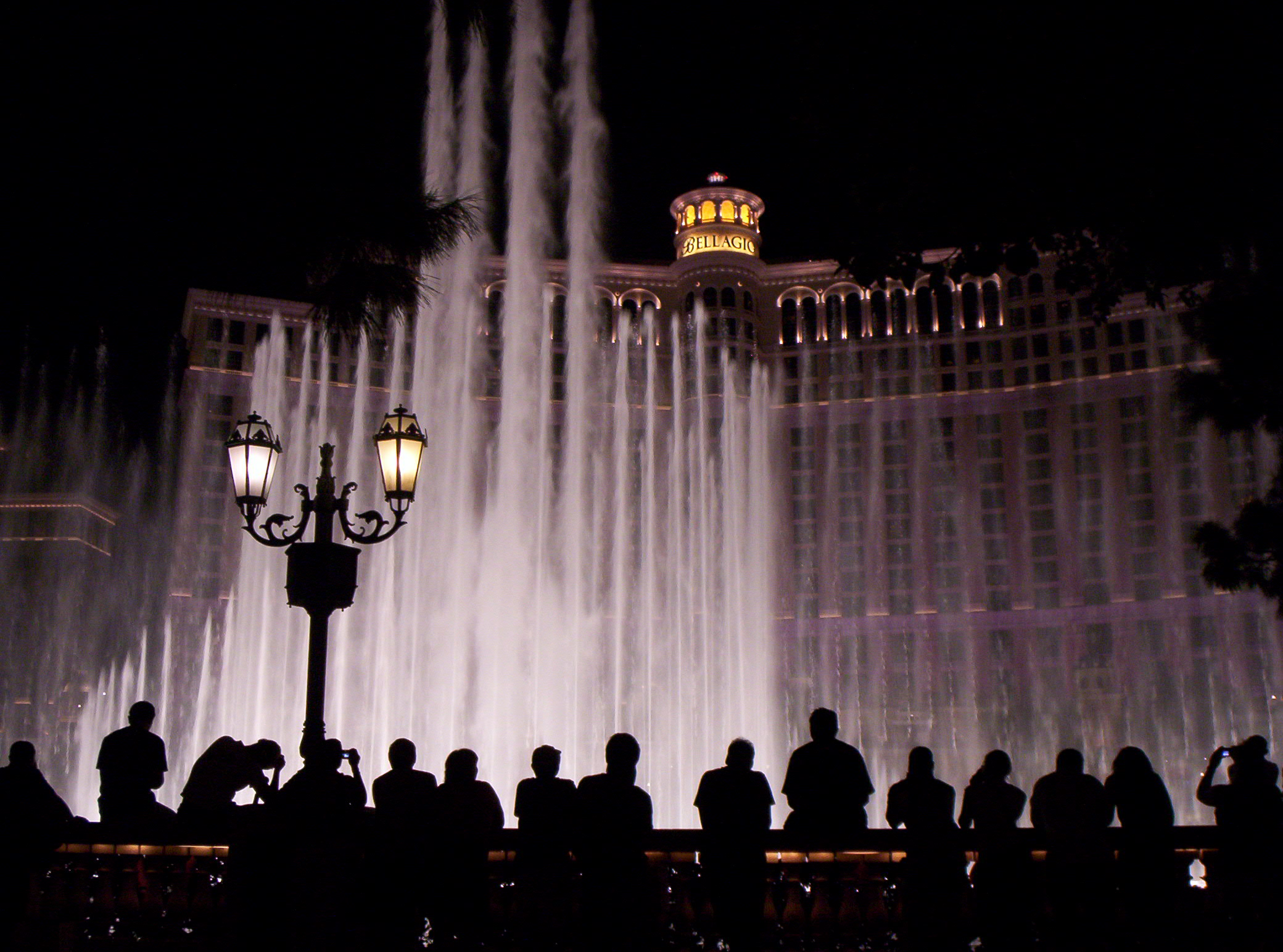
Fountains of Bellagio at night (2006)

He and his creative design firm are known for notable water features that include the Fountains of Bellagio, The Dubai Fountain, the CityCenter in Las Vegas, the rebuilt Revson Fountain at the Lincoln Center, and The Waters of the Olympic Park, featured in Sochi, Russia (designed for the 2014 Winter Olympics).

=== Honors and accolades ===
In 2010, Mark received the Themed Entertainment Association’s Thea Lifetime Achievement Award, and was named one of Fast Company’s Most Creative People. Later that year, The New Yorker called him “the closest thing the world has to a fountain genius”.

Fuller was featured in The New York Times’s "Corner Office" business feature in 2011, spoke at Salt Lake City's first TEDx on the topic of "Design Disintegration". and was inducted into the Utah Technology Council’s Hall of Fame.

WET Design received the American Institute of Architects’s “Allied Professions Honor Award", a Los Angeles Architecture Award for Landscape Architecture and Images of Universal Design Excellence Project Award. The company has also been named one of Fast Company’s Most Innovative Companies in 2010 and has been featured in Interior Design, The New York Times, theLos Angeles Times and CBS News Sunday Morning.

== Personal ==
Mark is married to Susan Miller and has two children, Madison Fuller and Harrison Fuller.
