= WET (company) =

American water feature design firm

- Founded: 1983
- Founder: Mark Fuller, Melanie Simon, and Alan Robinson
- Headquarters: Sun Valley, Los Angeles, California, USA
- Key people: Mark Fuller, CEO
- Website: wetdesign.com

WET, also known as WET Design, is a water feature design firm based in Los Angeles, California. Founded in 1983 by former Disney Imagineers Mark Fuller, Melanie Simon, and Alan Robinson, the company has designed over two hundred fountains and water features using water, fire, ice, fog, and lights. It is known for creating The Dubai Fountain, the world's largest performing fountain, along with the 8-acre (3.2 ha) Fountains of Bellagio. It has designed features in over 20 countries around the world, in North America, Europe, Asia and the Middle East.

WET holds more than 60 patents pertaining to lighting, water control, and specialty fountain devices that use air compression technology. The company is a frequently cited source for the role water plays in communities other than for purely utilitarian needs. WET was also featured in and co-produced the 2013 Discovery Channel reality television show The Big Brain Theory, Pure Genius, where the winner of the show was given $50,000 and a one-year contract to work at WET.

== History ==
=== 1980s ===
WET was founded as WET Enterprises, Inc., which at the time stood for Water Entertainment Technologies, by Mark Fuller, Melanie Simon, and Alan Robinson in 1983. All three had worked together as Imagineers at Disney. During his time at Disney, Fuller created the “Leapfrog” fountain at Epcot, using laminar technology, which evolved from the subject of his senior college thesis project at the University of Utah. The company was renamed WET Design in 1985, the same year that Claire Kahn joined the company as Director of Design. Later, its name became simply WET from WET Design. The company also named WET Labs.

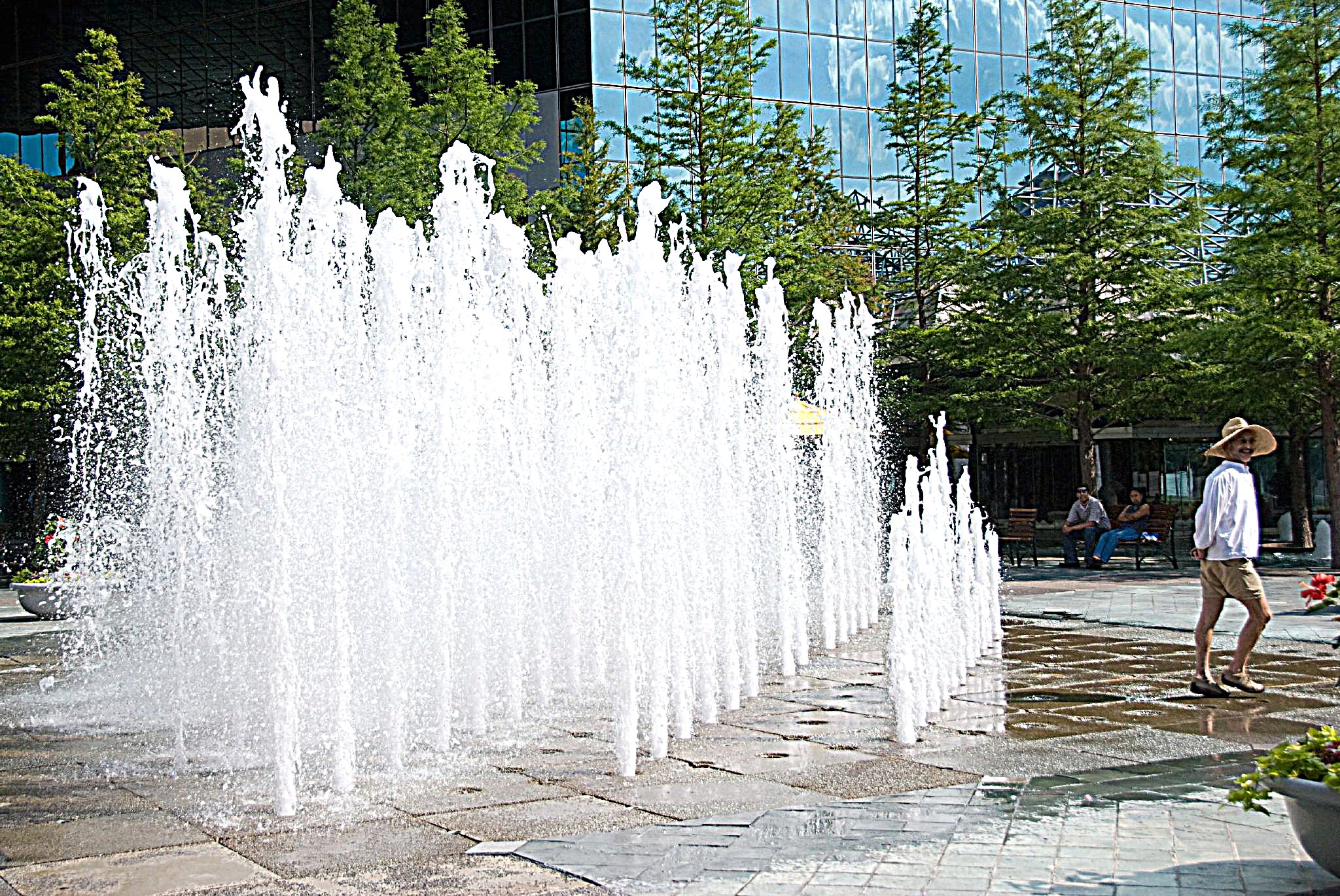
Surface water feature at Fountain Place (2008)

The company's first major project came in 1986 when it collaborated with the firm of I. M. Pei as well as landscape architects Dan Kiley and Peter Ker Walker to create the waterscape of Fountain Place (at Allied Bank Tower) in Dallas, Texas. The project showed the first use of WET's patented open-jointed paving in a fountain where shots of water appear from the openings in the plaza's surface.

WET's first municipal project came in 1987 when it was commissioned to create a work for the Los Angeles Music Center. The work was designed around Peace On Earth, (Note: See photo of statue with fountain.) a controversial sculpture designed by Jacques Lipchitz.

In 1988, WET introduced the first of its patented shooters, the MiniShooter, which utilizes compressed air to propel water in the air, for the Seto Ohashi Exhibition in Sakaide City, Japan. That same year, the company designed the Splatter Up baseball game manufactured by Worlds of Wonder.

=== 1990s ===
WET teamed with architects Skidmore, Owings & Merrill in 1991 for a water feature at the Gas Company Tower in Los Angeles, California. WET designed a series of transparent in-floor elements with water displays on the underside, on which the public can walk and which stretched from the elevator lobby to the building's exterior garden. They also utilized their shooter and laminar flow technology in a fountain located in the activity center of the Glorietta mall in Makati, Philippines. The jet used in this fountain was able to propel water to nearly the height of the mall’s 190 foot high ceiling of the atrium. From 1994 through 1997, WET completed many projects throughout Asia including the Singapore features of Millenia Walk, by Pritzker Architectural Prize Laureate Philip Johnson, the Ritz Carlton Hotel, and Bugis Junction. Additional projects included the Jewelry Trade Center in Bangkok, Pattaya Festival Center in the city of Pattaya, and again with the firm of I.M. Pei, the Anggana Danamon Bank in Jakarta.

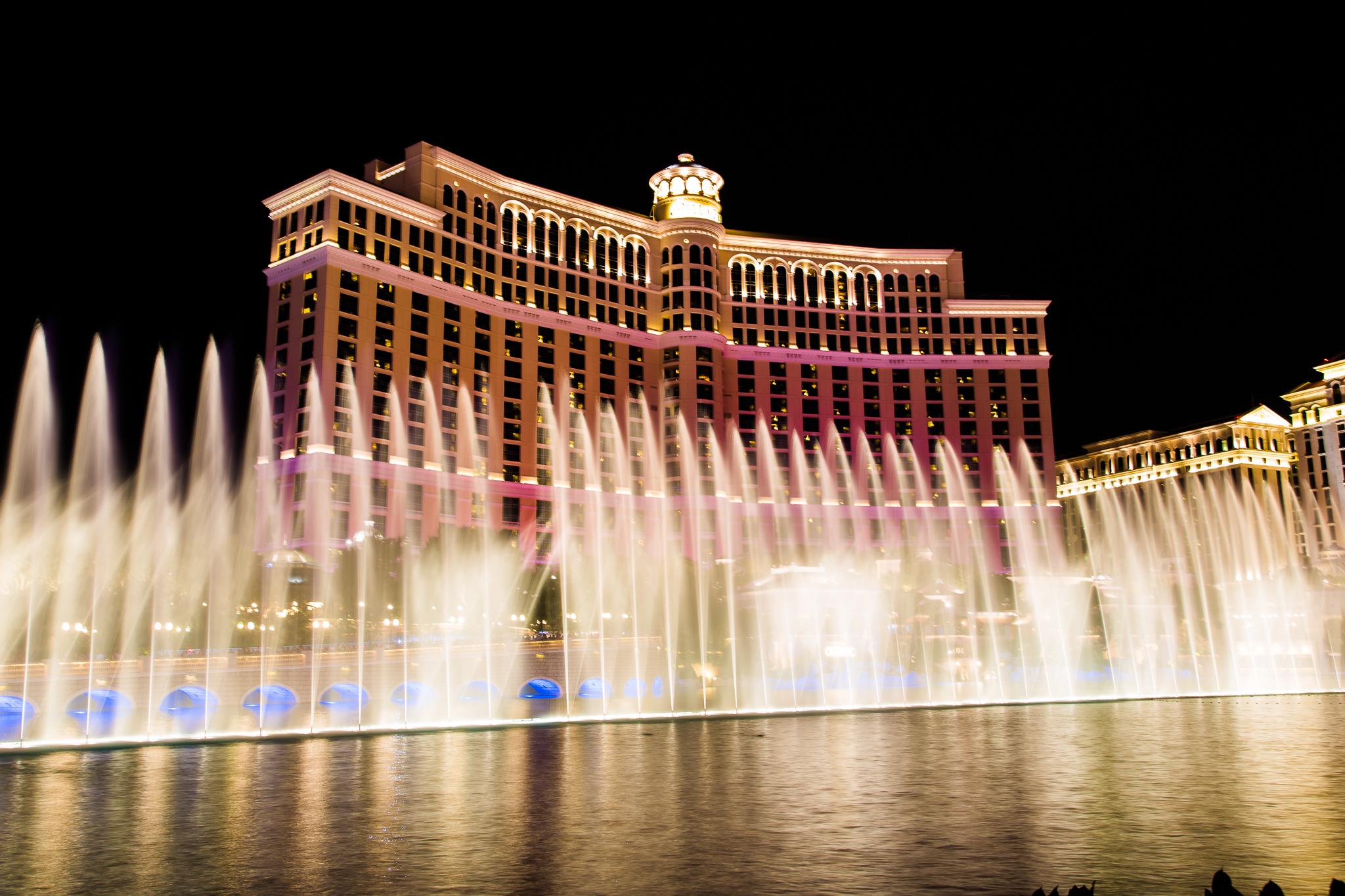
Bellagio (2013)

One of the company's most notable designs came in 1998 when it collaborated with Steve Wynn to design the Fountains of Bellagio, for the Bellagio Hotel and Casino, in Las Vegas, Nevada. The Fountains are set in an 8-acre (3.2 ha) manmade lake. Under Bellagio, WET collaborated with an array of composers and choreographers to create the Fountain's shows, including renowned composer Gerard Schurmann and the American choreographer, producer and director Kenny Ortega. Contrary to urban myth, the lake is not filled with treated greywater from the hotel. The lake is serviced by a freshwater well that was drilled decades prior to irrigate a golf course that previously existed on the site. The Fountains actually use less water than irrigating the golf course did. In the event of an emergency, the Fountain's reservoir can be pumped into firefighting equipment to assist any neighboring casino without drawing from the city system. The Fountains of Bellagio introduced WET's motion controlled robotic water nozzles, built for WET by the robotics company Sarcos, for the first time in the industry. After this project, WET expanded its manufacturing capabilities to where it is now manufacturing virtually all of its invented devices in house. The company's feature incorporate a network of pipes with more than 1,200 individually programmed nozzles that make it possible to stage fountain displays coordinated with more than 4,500 lights. It is estimated that the Fountains cost $40 million to build. The nozzles are synchronized to music and shoot water up to 240 feet in the air. Charles Fishman's, Big Thirst features how people have emotional bonds to water and highlights WET's Fountains of Bellagio project.

WET completed its first major project in Europe in 1998 with the fountains for the 1998 Lisboa Expo in Lisbon, Portugal. The same year WET was recognized by the American Institute of Architects by receiving the Allied Professions Honor Award and was also featured in the Cooper Hewitt National Design Museum exhibit "Fountains: Splash and Spectacle." In 1999 it completed a project for the Barcelona World Trade Center which featured water banners that emerged from the plaza in the central atrium of the project.

=== 2000s ===
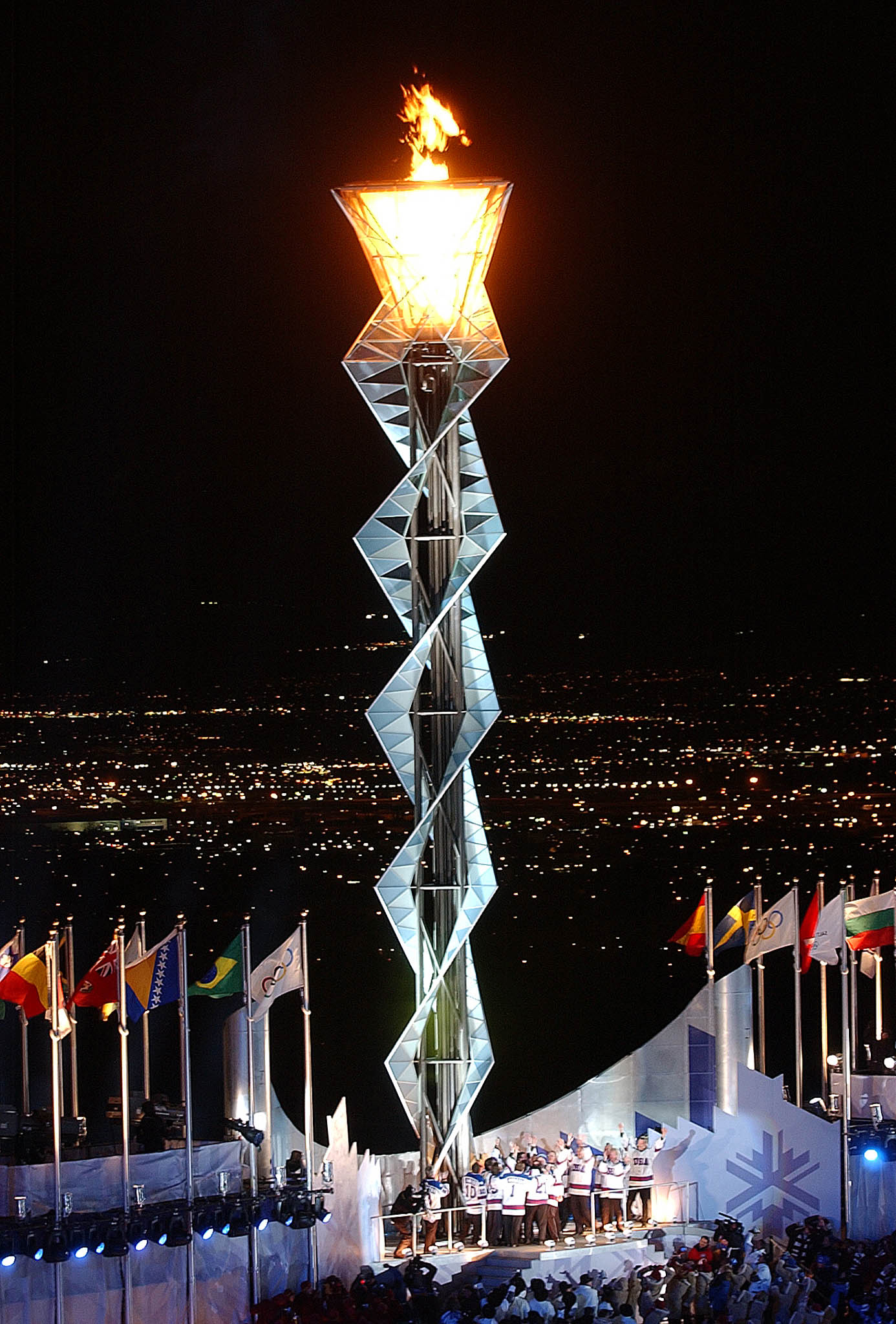
The Cauldron for the 2002 Winter Olympics

WET became part of the 2002 Winter Olympic Games in Salt Lake City, Utah by winning the competition for the design of the Cauldron that lights the Olympic flame. The design included a 120-foot tower of reflective glass panels and incorporated water and fire. Marrying both with function, tiny jets sent water down the glass sides of the Cauldron, to keep the glass and metal cooled and clean and give the effect of melting ice. WET also released a book titled Creating the Cauldron that detailed the behind the scenes of the project and revealed how the company beat out others to win the competition, and how WET only had 18 months to create the Cauldron. Upon the completion of the games, the Cauldron was installed at Rice Eccles Stadium at the University of Utah, in the Salt Lake 2002 Olympic Cauldron Park.

In 2005, WET was contracted to design a water themed set for the 2005 MTV Video Music Awards, marking one of the company's first commissioned temporary features. The final design included 7,000 gallons of water that flowed under the stage, 2,000 feet of piping, and 8,000 feet of electrical wire.

WET developed its third water feature in New York in 2004 as part of a renovation of the Brooklyn Museum. (The first was the Museum of Modern Art's garden fountain in 1987 and the second was Rockefeller Center's Prometheus Fountain in 1988.) In 2005, WET completed two more projects in New York: the fountains at Columbus Circle and the United States Tennis Association feature. For Columbus Circle, the company worked in collaboration with the Olin Partnership.

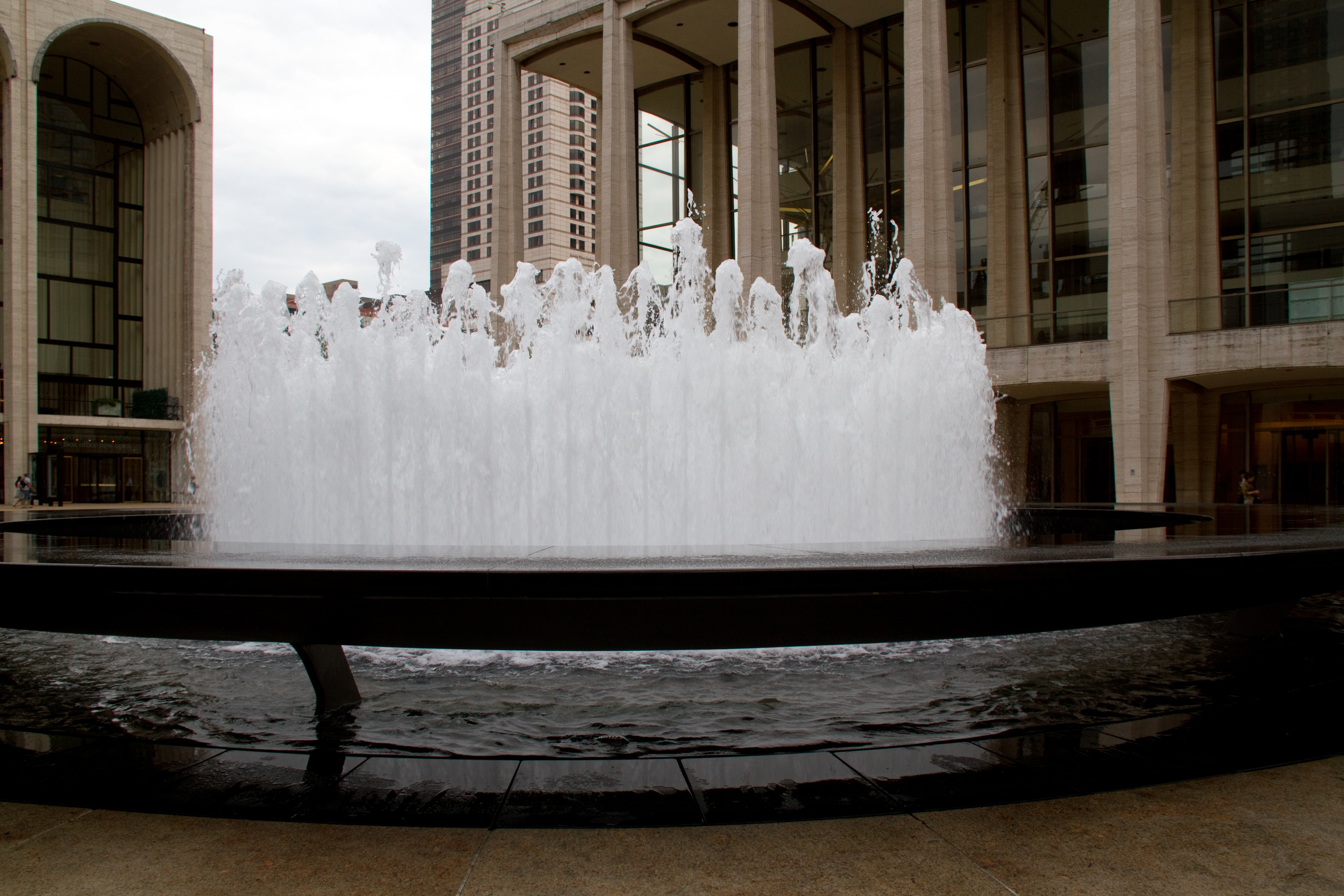
Revson Fountain (2011)

WET was commissioned in 2006 to redesign the Revson Fountain, originally opened in 1964 at the Lincoln Center for the Performing Arts, in New York. The company was engaged to redesign the fountain at the recommendation of the firm Diller Scofidio + Renfro who were the lead designers on the overall renovation of the Lincoln Center.

WET moved from Universal City to Sun Valley, CA in 2006. In the same year, the company also collaborated with Steve Wynn a second time to create the Performance Lake at Wynn Macau. It continued with casino designs in 2008 when the company was commissioned to transform the volcano feature at the Mirage Hotel and Casino.

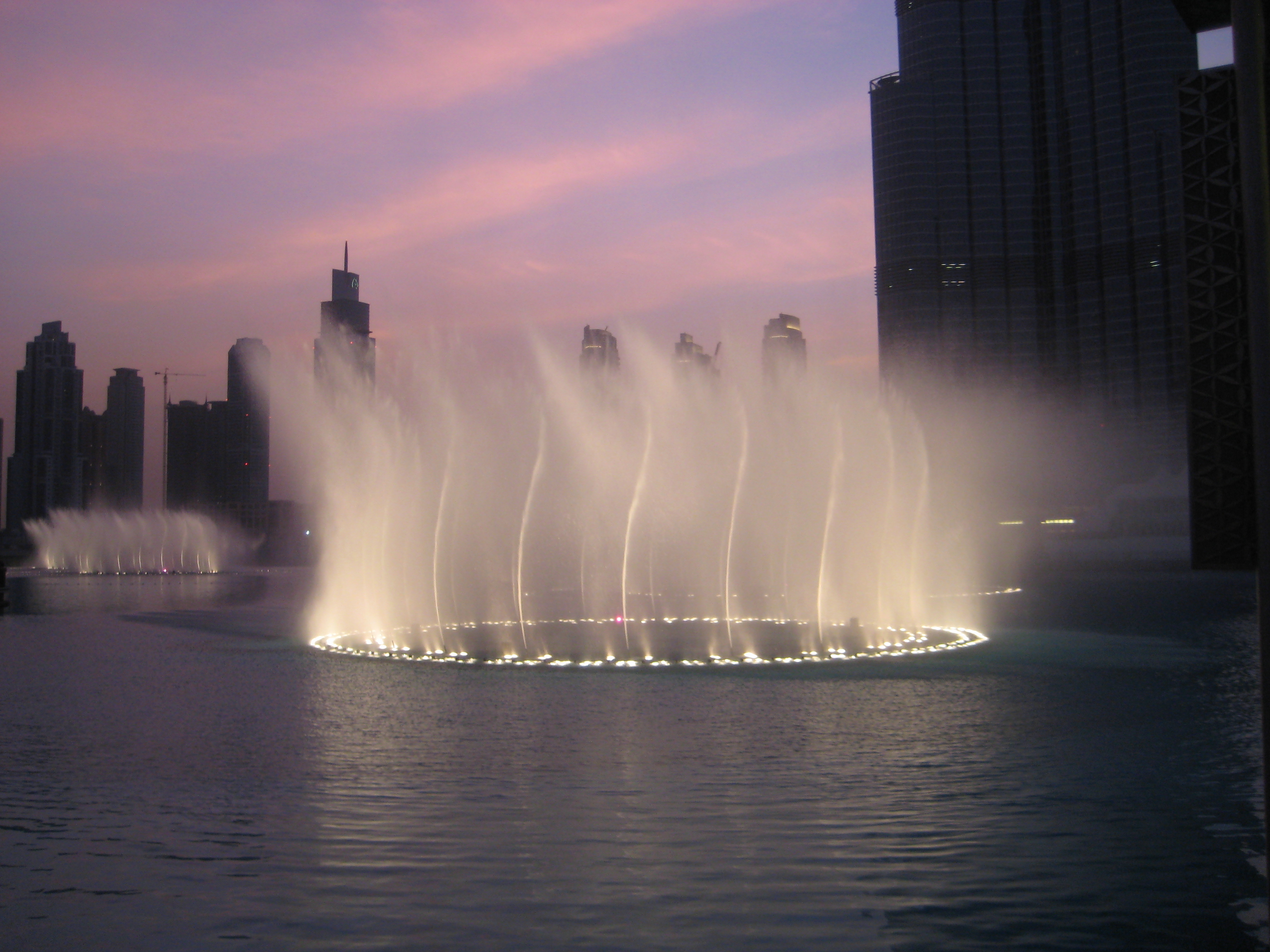
The Dubai Fountain (2010)

WET was credited in 2009 with creating the world's largest performing fountain, with its creation of The Dubai Fountain. The Fountain contains 6,600 underwater lights which can be seen from space more than 200 miles away. It was also in 2009 that the company was commissioned to create five fountains for the Las Vegas City Center. One fountain was the world's first choreographed ice feature with another being the world's widest programmable water wall.

=== 2010s ===
WET completed additional Dubai projects beginning in 2010. These include five fountains at Burj Khalifa Tower Park in Dubai. That same year in Beijing, WET's feature at the Global Trade Center premiered the company's WaterBells; manipulating laminar flow fountains to create dome-shaped sheets of water.

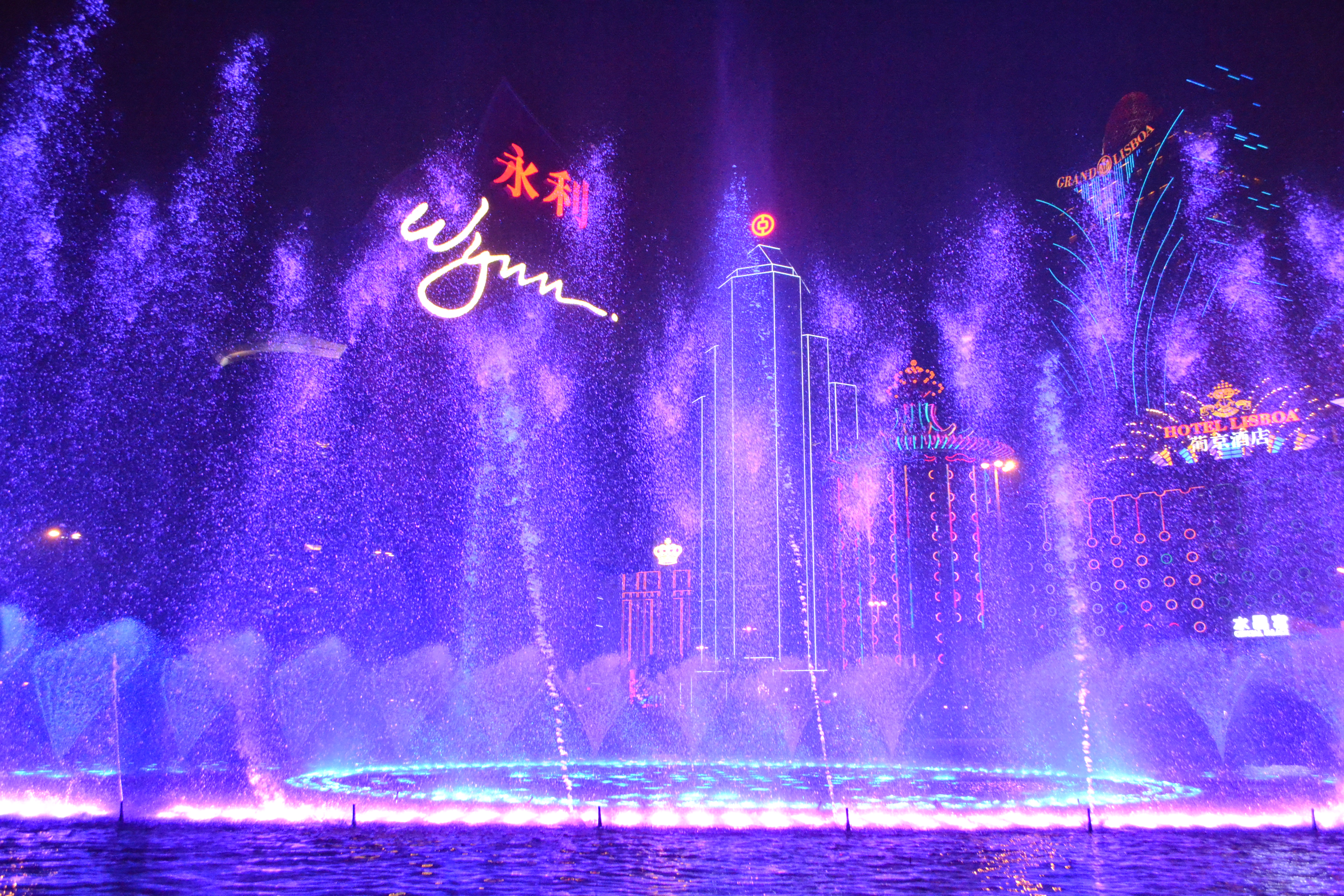
Wynn Macau (2013)

In 2012, WET enhanced the original 2006 design for the Wynn Macau, doubling the density of the design and debuting the world's brightest (280) watt) underwater LED lights that were engineered and manufactured by WET. WET completed the installation of three fountains at the City Creek Center shopping mall in Salt Lake City, Utah in 2012. The fountains included dancing water, light, fire and music. The company was also commissioned to create the fountain show for the Expo 2012 Yeosu Korea for the expo's signature Big-O Water Feature. The same year, WET created one of the largest water shows in the world with the completion of Aquanura in the Efteling theme park, in the Netherlands.

WET created Luminous, a water wall spanning over 3 stories tall for the W Hotels Guangzhou’s entrance, debuting with the hotel’s opening in April 2013. The WET-designed wall of water and light is composed of a thinly-woven metal screen over which water runs upon at different programmed rates to vary in appearance. In addition to choreographing the wall's surging water, WET used 5,000 color changing LEDs to allow the 19-meter mosaic of light, lines, and color to morph throughout the day.

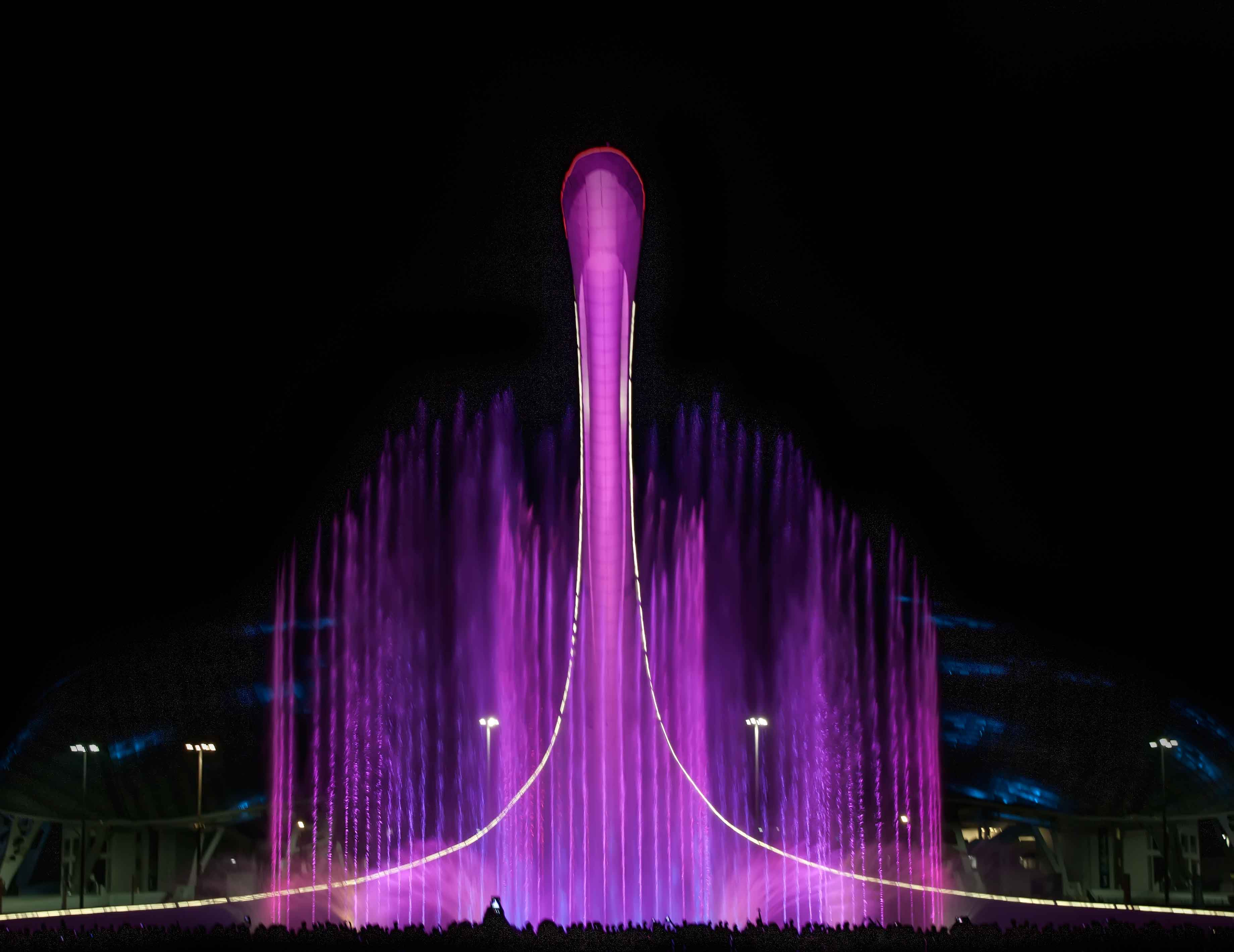
Sochi (2017)

For the 2014 Winter Olympic Games in Sochi, Russia, WET created The Waters of the Olympic Park, a colorful choreographed fountain located in the Sochi Medals Plaza. The feature was prominently featured during the Olympic Games’ opening and closing ceremonies. This second Olympic feature for WET (first being the 2002 Winter Olympics Cauldron in Salt Lake City), houses a basin containing about 700,000 gallons of water, designed to reveal the five Olympic rings within performances. The feature is choreographed water displays set to a soundtrack of famous Russian composers including Tchaikovsky and Khachaturian.

In late 2013, WET debuted Lycaste, an interactive children's fountain named and designed after the lycaste orchid for Dasada, a resort in Prachinburi, Thailand. Set upon a deck of teak wood, the feature is experienced via WET's LED lighting at day in bright white and night in vibrantly programmed color combinations. The feature was removed from Dasada in 2020 due to the COVID-19 pandemic and management restructuring. The former owner of the resort and flower gallery commissioned WET to rebuild the feature, and was relocated to Boonta Flowers and Cafe at Natai Beach in Phang Nga, about 20 minutes from Phuket.

== Design features ==
WET has pioneered many of the technologies that have since become common in fountains built around the world, by others as well as WET. These technologies include laminar flow fountains, fountains that arise from the open-jointed paving instead of from pools, fountains powered by compressed air instead of pumps, and fountains employing sophisticated underwater robots. Hallmarks of WET fountains are that the water itself is the element of interest (no statuary covered by water); there are few if any boundaries between the fountain and viewers; the fountains display novel and surprising water forms not seen in traditional fountains; and many WET fountains take choreographic movement of the individual water elements to a level of precision and variable motion that approaches those of human performers. The company is also known for using multiple natural elements in its designs, like fog, fire, and ice; accompanying its sophisticated water forms, or alone.

== Select list installations ==
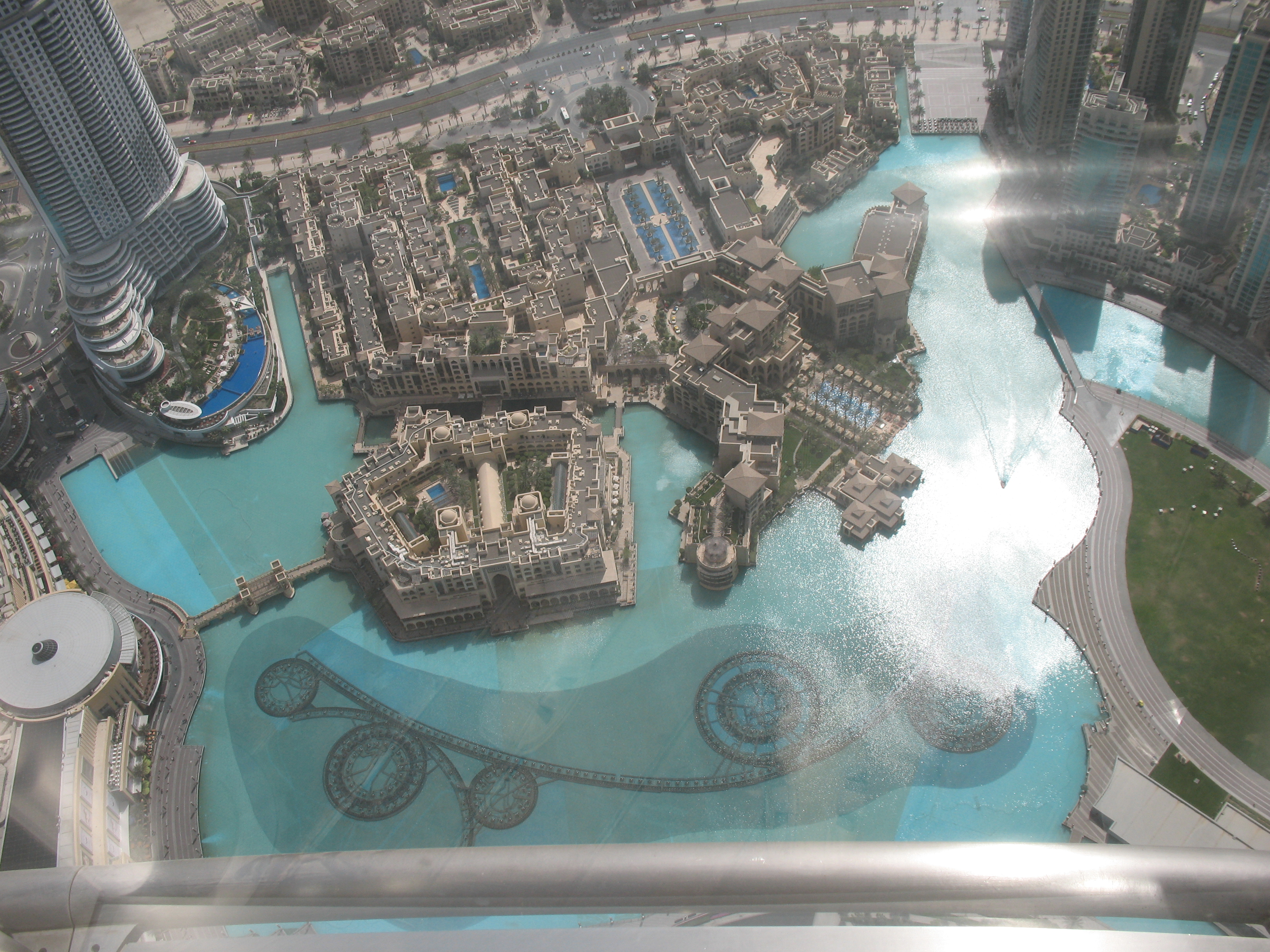
Overhead view of The Dubai Fountain.

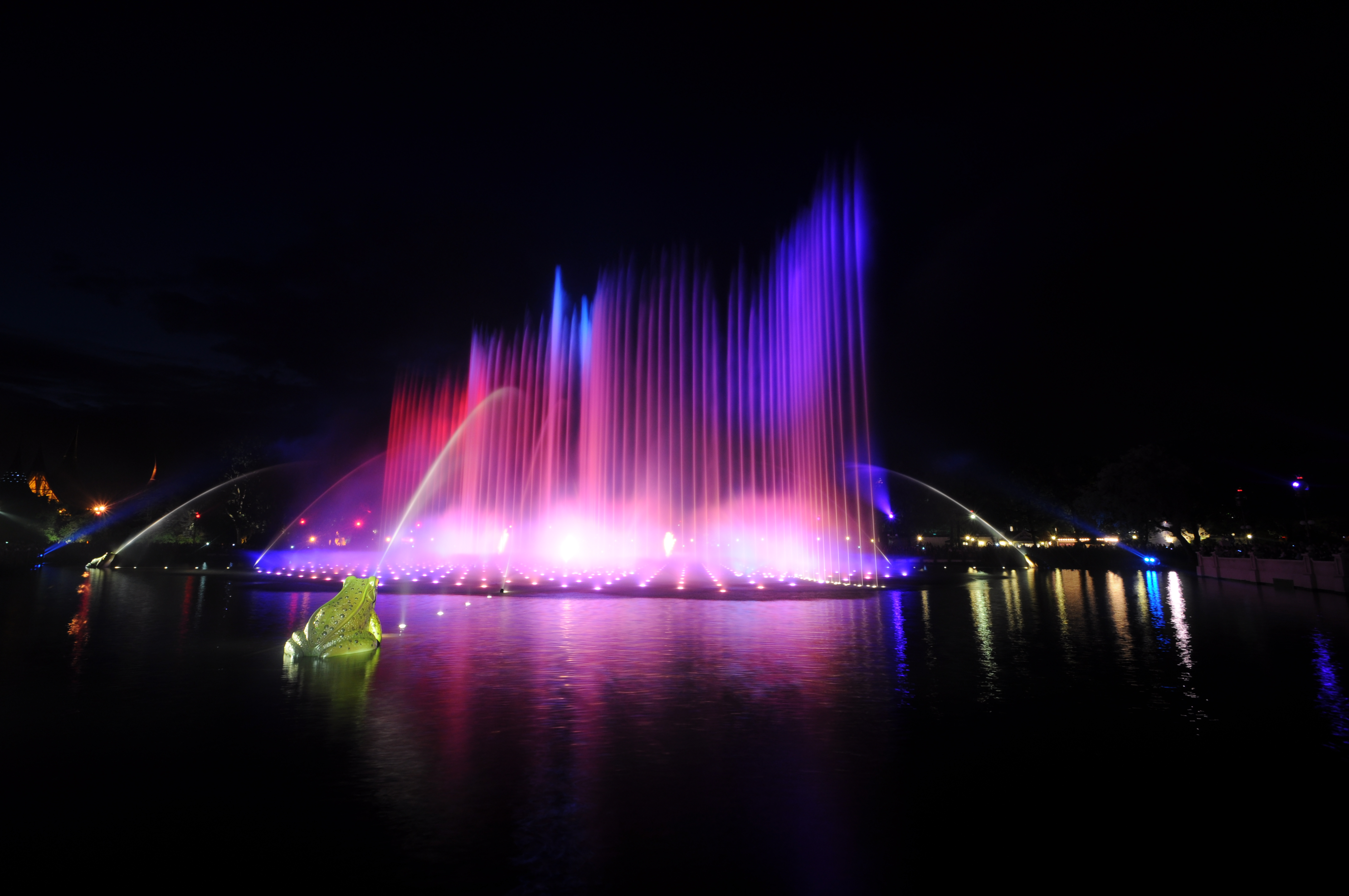
Aquanura Efteling

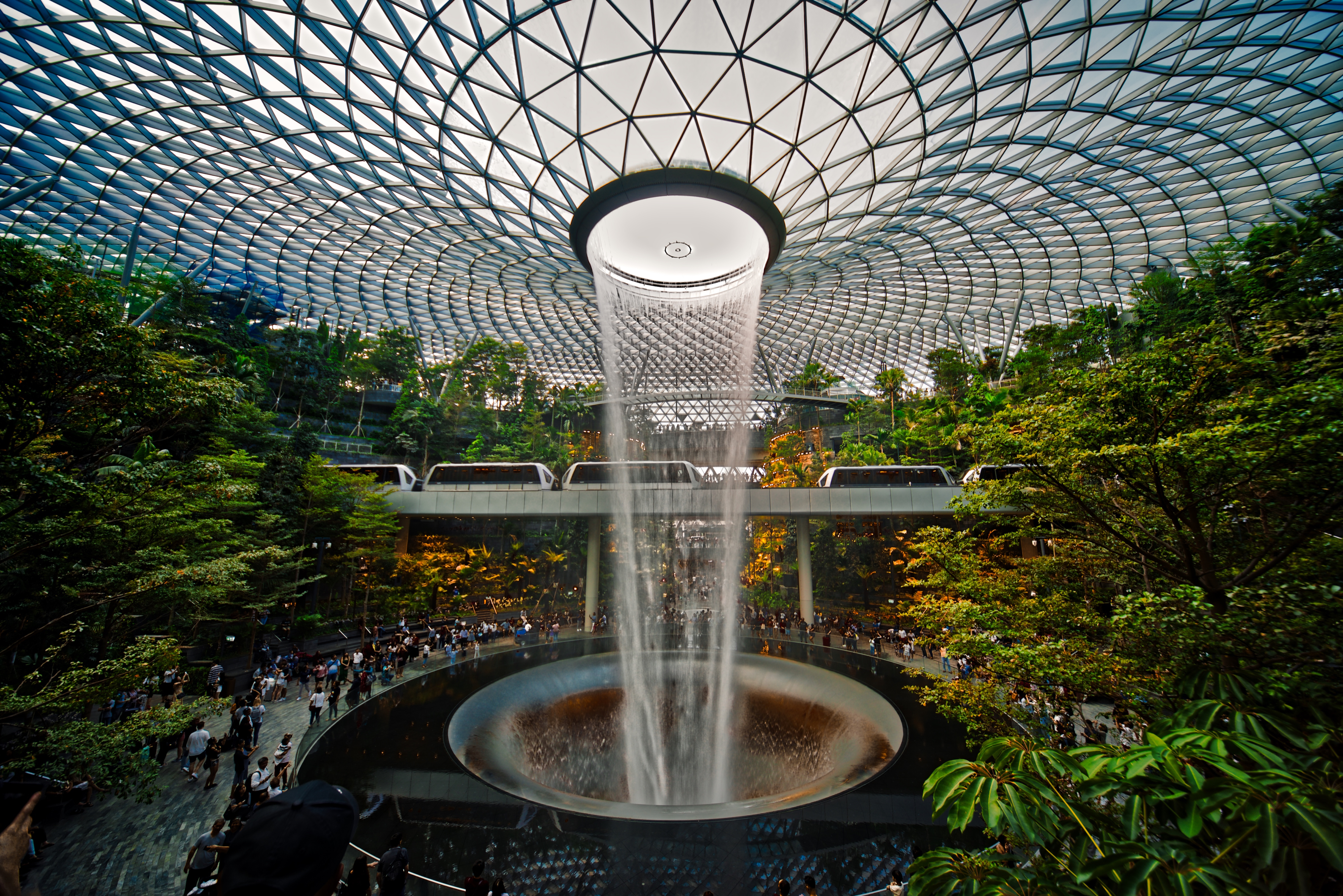
Jewel Changi Airport

WET has completed more than 250 installations in countries throughout the world. Installations range from features so small that the water seen barely fills a cup, to the world's largest performing fountain, The Dubai Fountain, and the entire range in between. A partial list of its installations include:

- 2023, Atlantis The Royal (5 Installations), Dubai, UAE
- 2022, Fountain of Joy at Dhirubhai Ambani Square, Jio World Centre, Mumbai, India
- 2021, Expo 2020 Water Feature, Dubai, UAE
- 2019, Jewel Changi Airport, HSBC Rain Vortex, The tallest Indoor Waterfall, Singapore
- 2017, The Fountain at Okada Manila, Entertainment City, Parañaque, Metro Manila, Philippines
- 2016, Performance Lake at Wynn Palace Cotai, Macau
- 2012, Fountains at City Creek Center, Salt Lake City, Utah, 3 installations
- 2012, Performance Lake at Wynn Macau, China, enhancement of original fountain from 2006.
- 2012, Aquanura Efteling, Kaatsheuvel, Netherlands.
- 2012, Yeosu Expo 2012, Big-O Water Feature, South Korea
- 2010, Global Trade Center, Beijing, China
- 2009, Las Vegas City Center, five installations.
- 2009, The Dubai Fountain, United Arab Emirates
- 2008, Mirage Volcano, enhancement to the Mirage Volcano at The Mirage Hotel and Casino, Las Vegas
- 2008, Fanfare at San Pedro Gateway, Port of Los Angeles, California, 2 installations
- 2009, Revson Fountain at the Lincoln Center for the Performing Arts, New York
- 2008, Waters of Americana at Brand, Glendale, California
- 2006, Performance Lake at Wynn Macau, China, original installation which was later enhanced in 2012
- 2005, Fountains at Columbus Circle, New York
- 2005, U.S. Tennis Association, Fountain at the South Plaza at the National Tennis Center, New York
- 2002, Winter Olympics in Salt Lake City, Utah, design of Olympic Cauldron
- 2002, The Grove at Farmer's Market in Los Angeles, California
- 1999, Burj Al Arab, Dubai, United Arab Emirates, 4 installations
- 1999, Water Tower Place, Chicago
- 1998, Fountains of Bellagio in Las Vegas, Nevada
- 1995, International Fountain at Seattle Center in Washington
- 1994, Ritz-Carlton Millenia, Singapore
- 1993, Glorietta Activity Center, Makati, Philippines (renovated)
- 1993, Epcot Center, Fountain of Nations Orlando, Florida
- 1993, Universal Citywalk, Universal City, California, 3 installations
- 1989, Fashion Island, Newport Beach, California, 2 installations

== Awards ==
WET has received numerous awards and recognition for its work, including company founder Mark Fuller being named one of the 100 Most Creative People In Business by Fast Company. A partial list of its awards include:

- 2013, Travelers’ Choice Award #1 US Attraction (In recognition of Fountains of Bellagio determined by TripAdvisor reviews)
- 2013, Entertainment Industries Council's SET Award for Documentary or Unscripted Non-fiction Category for The Big Brain Theory: Pure Genius (In recognition of The Big Brain Theory inspiring youth in science, engineering and technology from the EIC's 2013 SET Awards)
- 2012, THEA Award for outstanding achievement (Aquanura, Efteling)
- 2012, Award of Appreciation (From Expo 2012 Yeosu Korea)
- 2010, 50 Most Innovative Companies, Fast Company
- 2010, Los Angeles Architectural Award, Los Angeles Business Council
- 2009, Excellence on the Waterfront Award, Urban Waterfront Conference
- 2006, General Design Award of Honor, American Society of Landscape Architects
- 2004, Project of the Year: Cultural, New York Construction Best of Awards
- 2002, Solutia Design Award, Solutia
