= Jessiko =

Autonomous fish-like robot

Jessiko is a 22 centimetres (8.7 in) long autonomous robot fish developed by French start-up Robotswim, located in Palaiseau, Paris area.

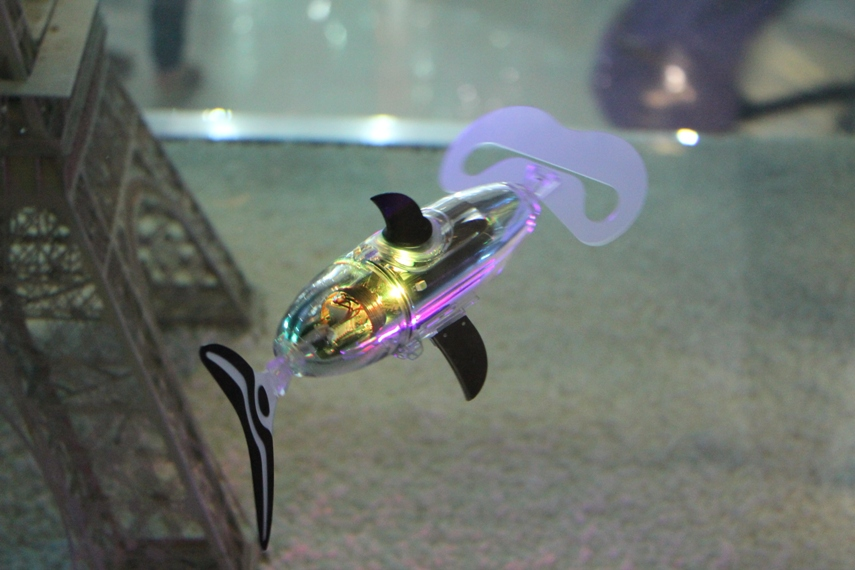
Jessiko robot fish on France Pavilion at Yeosu 2012 World Expo

== History ==
Jessiko project was launched in 2005 by Christophe Tiraby, a French engineer.

In March 2009, Christophe Tiraby founded Robotswim company to industrialize and commercialize Jessiko.

In November 2009, "Jessiko robot fish" wins the Great Prize of Innovation of Paris City in the Design category.

Jessiko is first exhibited at Innorobo robotic fair in March 2011.

From May 12 to August 12, Jessiko is exhibited on France Pavilion Expo 2012 Yeosu World Fair in South Korea. Robotswim implemented at this occasion the first school of robot fish in permanent conditions.

== Versions ==
5 versions of prototypes have been developed (V0 to V4)

Industrial version commercialized since 2012 is V5.

== Characteristics ==
Jessiko V5
Length	22 centimetres (8.7 in)
Width	9 centimetres (3.5 in)
Height	10 centimetres (3.9 in)
Body length	13 centimetres (5.1 in)
Weight	150 grams (5.3 oz)
Swimming range	8 hours

== Use ==
Jessiko was marketed as a luxury decoration for businesses such as hotels, restaurants, and museums. Tiraby expressed hope that one day it would be common to find his invention in household ponds and swimming pools.

== See also ==
- Biomechatronics

=== External links ===
- Robotswim official website
- Robotswim Youtube channel
