= Expo 2012 =

International exposition in Yeosu, South Korea

2012 Yeosu
- Expo 2012's logo

Overview
- BIE-class: Specialized exposition
- Category: International Recognized Exhibition
- Name: Expo 2012
- Visitors: 8,203,956
- Organized by: Kang Dong-Suk
- Mascot: Yeony & Suny

Participant(s)
- Countries: 105

Location
- Country: South Korea
- City: Yeosu
- Coordinates: 34°44′57″N 127°44′50″E

Timeline
- Awarded: November 26, 2007
- Opening: May 12, 2012
- Closure: August 12, 2012

Specialized expositions
- Previous: Expo 2008 in Zaragoza
- Next: Expo 2017 in Astana

Universal expositions
- Previous: Expo 2010 in Shanghai
- Next: Expo 2015 in Milan

Horticultural expositions
- Previous: Expo 2006 in Chiang Mai
- Next: Expo 2016 in Antalya

Simultaneous
- Horticultural (AIPH): Expo 2012

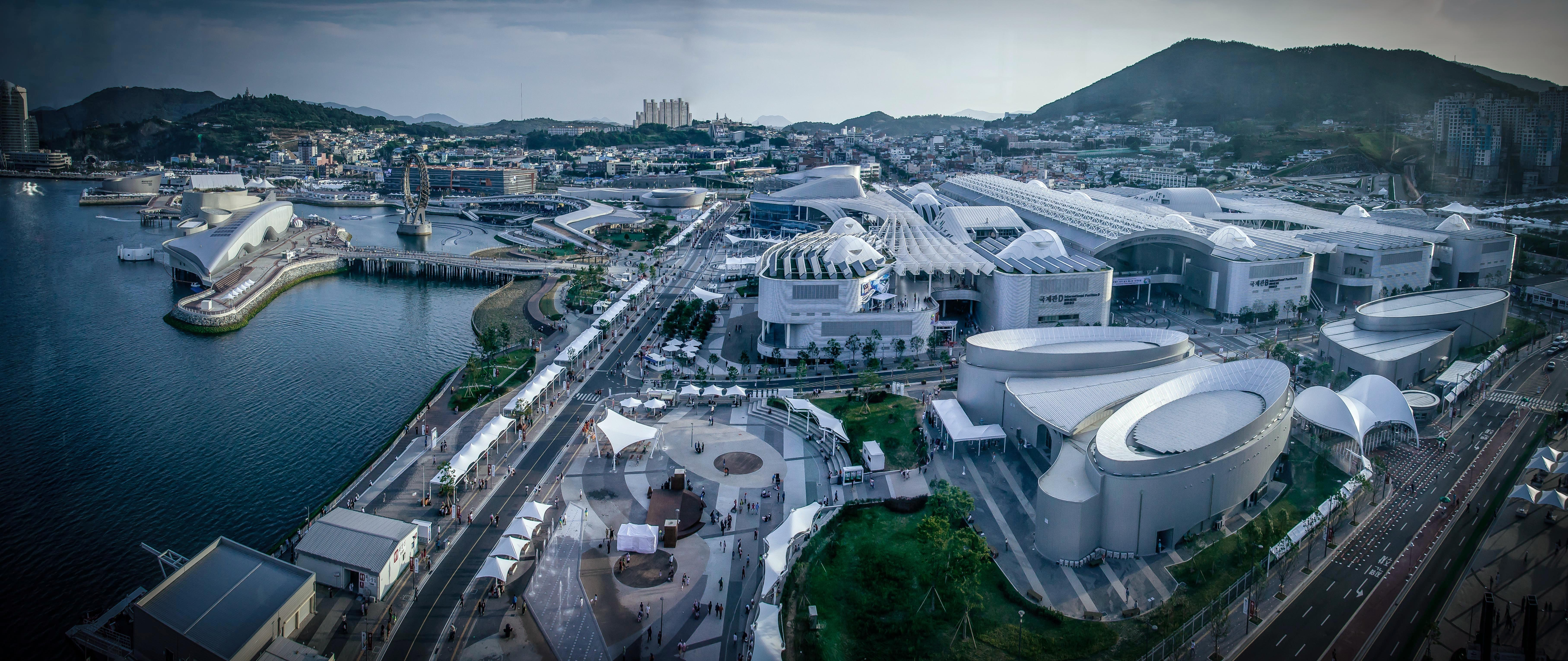
Panoramic view of Expo 2012 Yeosu

Expo 2012 (Korean: 2012 여수세계박람회; Hanja: 2012 麗水世界博覽會) was an International Exposition recognized by the Bureau International des Expositions (BIE) held in Yeosu, South Korea which opened on May 12, 2012 and ran until August 12, 2012. The theme of the Expo was "The Living Ocean and Coast" with subthemes of "Preservation and Sustainable Development of the Ocean and Coast", "New Resources Technology", and "Creative Marine Activities". There were 105 participating countries, international organizations, and 8,203,956 visitors.

Expo 2012 opened on May 12 in the southern coastal town of Yeosu, approximately 455 kilometers south of Seoul. It was the second international fair hosted by South Korea, after Expo '93 in Daejeon. The expo site for 80 exhibition halls stretched out alongside the sea with promenades and exhibit spaces extending to the island of Odongdo and the seawalls. The Expo also received positive reaction for addressing global issues like climate change and the protection of the ocean through story-telling events.

== Outline ==
The Expo 2012 took place in a 1.74 million square meter facility in Yeosu City. The theme, "The Living Ocean and Coast", was supplemented by a song, "Stories told by the sea", and represented by two mascots Yeony and Suny. During planning, the expo was expected to lead to 12.2 trillion won in production, 5.7 trillion won in economic stimulus, and 79,000 jobs.

=== Participants ===
103 countries and 8 international organizations participated in Expo 2012.

Europe	23	Turkmenistan, Armenia, Azerbaijan, Belgium, Croatia, Denmark, France, Germany, Italy, Kazakhstan, Lithuania, Monaco, Netherlands, Norway, Romania, Russia, Spain, Sweden, Switzerland, Tajikistan, Turkey, Ukraine, Uzbekistan
The Americas	20	Antigua and Barbuda, Argentina, Colombia, Commonwealth of Dominica, Dominican Republic, Ecuador, El Salvador, Guatemala, Grenada, Guyana, Honduras, Mexico, Nicaragua, Panama, Paraguay, Peru, St. Kitts and Nevis, Suriname, Uruguay, United States
Oceania	1	Australia
Asia	30	Bangladesh, Brunei, Cambodia, China, East Timor, Fiji, India, Indonesia, Japan, Kiribati, Laos, Malaysia, Maldives, Marshall Islands, Mongolia, Nauru, Nepal, Pakistan, Palau, Papua New Guinea, Philippines, Samoa, Singapore, Solomon Islands, Sri Lanka, Thailand, Tonga, Tuvalu, Vanuatu, Vietnam
Africa	25	Algeria, Angola, Burkina Faso, Central African Republic, Côte d'Ivoire, Democratic Republic of the Congo, Egypt, Eritrea, Gabon, Gambia, Ghana, Guinea, Kenya, Libya, Mali, Mauritania, Nigeria, Rwanda, Senegal, Seychelles, Sudan, Tanzania, Tunisia, Uganda
Middle East	7	Israel, Jordan, Oman, Qatar, Saudi Arabia, UAE, Yemen
International organizations	9	CBD, FAO, GEF (Global Environment Facility), IOC, IPCC, OECD, PEMSEA, UN, WFP

== Mascot and symbol ==
=== Mascot ===
Yeony and Suny, the official mascots of Expo 2012 Yeosu Korea, are personifications of plankton. Each of their names is derived from "Yeosu", where Yeo means "beautiful" and Su means "water".

=== Emblem ===
A simplified abstraction of the organic forms of ecology, oceans and environment are represented in the logo.

== Selection process ==
142nd Meeting of the International Exhibitions Bureau; 19:00 November 26, 2007, in Palais des congrès de Paris, France
City	Nation	Round 1	Round 2
Yeosu	South Korea	68	77
Tangier	Morocco	59	63
Wrocław	Poland	13	-

To host, a venue must receive over 2/3 of the votes cast by BIE member countries in the first round of voting. At each round of voting, the venue with the fewest votes is out and there is an additional vote between the remaining venues.

== Theme, vision, and goals ==
=== Theme ===
The Living Ocean and Coast: Diversity of Resources and Sustainable Development

==== Background of theme ====
- The Expo theme aimed to help shed light on humankind's knowledge and advancement of technology concerning the ocean and coast and identify ways to resolve challenges facing the ocean. Since the United Nations Convention on the Law of the Sea went into effect in 1993, the ocean has emerged as an important element in resolving various problems humankind faces, including those related to resources, food, space and the environment. However, industrial activities have damaged the marine ecosystem and subsequently reduced fish stocks. As a result, the ocean faces severe crisis. A damaged marine ecosystem, global warming and natural disasters are not limited to a certain country or region, but are issues that have global implications.

==== Subthemes ====
The theme, "The Living Ocean and Coast", was divided into three sub-themes: Development and Preservation of the Ocean and Coast, New Resources Technology, and Creative Marine Activities. These sub-themes have been further developed into 6 thematic groups, namely, Climate & Environment, Marine Life, Marine Industry & Technology, Marine City and Marine Civilization, and Marine Arts, each of which are demonstrated in their respective sub-theme pavilions.

Development and Preservation of the Ocean and Coast aimed to encourage greater cooperation in the international community in addressing climate change and to explore a paradigm where development and preservation find a better balance. The last few decades have witnessed environmental degradation caused by use and development of natural resources. Economies and societies must reduce their current fossil fuel-based economies to minimize damage to both people and the environment. The sub-theme argued that individuals, businesses, countries and the global community must recognize that marine resources are limited and should not be subject to careless use, but that they are important to the development of future society, and that people and ecosystems should be considered on the same level.

New Resources Technology illustrated the progress and future prospects of marine technology, its role as a growth driver and potential in socioeconomic development. Countries were developing technologies within marine-related industries to address issues related to resources and the changing environment. The discreet use of resources, which strikes a balance between development and preservation, was presented as requiring advances in marine science and technology. Fostering marine industries was presented as a means of creating added value, generating new jobs, and transforming sluggish industries into low cost, high-efficiency structures.

Creative Maritime Activities aimed to demonstrate the relationship between the oceans and humankind through culture and art and promote the new ideals of the seatizen and seavilization. A mix of play and experience (edutainment) aimed to trigger the imagination and curiosity of attendees towards an unknown world and to inspire children to learn to love and appreciate the oceans. A wide collection of marine-related culture and arts, including poetry, novels, films, operas, musicals, plays and music were shown at the Yeosu Expo.

== Primary content ==
=== Korean Pavilion ===
The Korean Pavilion was designed to convey the theme of Expo 2012 Yeosu Korea, whilst also emphasizing Korea's vision and role.
The exhibition hall was adorned with traditional Korean constructions and colors. The event organizers have also stated that a diverse selection of official events and "event corners", representing Korean culture, will be prepared for the international occasion.
An exhibition that has been highlighted in the lead-up to the event was one that will feature the most notable achievements in Korean shipbuilding, marine transportation, marine products, marine technology, and marine safety. These achievements are shown in two exhibition halls.

The first exhibition hall Sea of Miracles focused on Korea's past ocean adventures. and was divided into three acts: Experiencing Korea's Seas, Discovering Korea's Maritime Spirit and - Realizing Korea's Maritime Capacity.

The second hall 2 Sea of Hope portrayed Korea's potential future role in maritime era and included the world's largest dome screen.

=== International Pavilions ===
It was anticipated that the International Pavilions section will occupy the exhibition space's largest physical area. This section of the Expo provided an opportunity for participating countries to plan and hold their exhibitions. Themed quarters were displayed in the International Pavilions exhibition, consisting of the "Sea of Life", "Sea of Exchange", "Sea of Peace", and "Sea of Land". There were total of four buildings (A, B, C, and D) each with several exhibition rooms for participating countries.

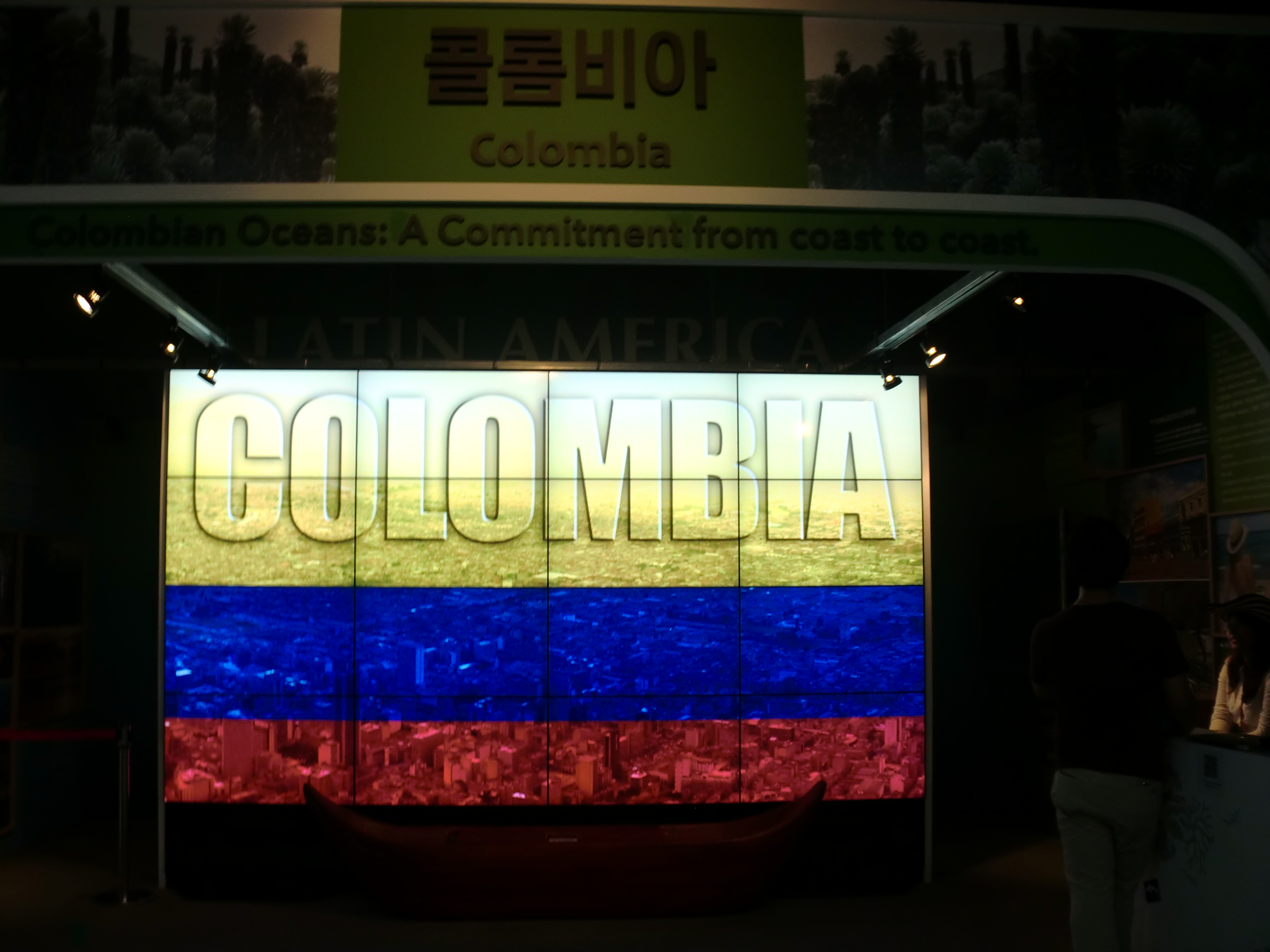
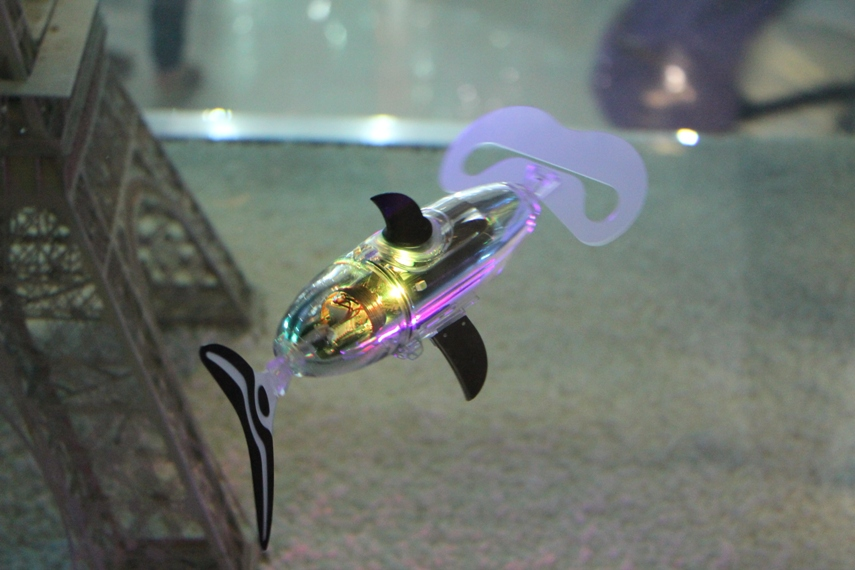
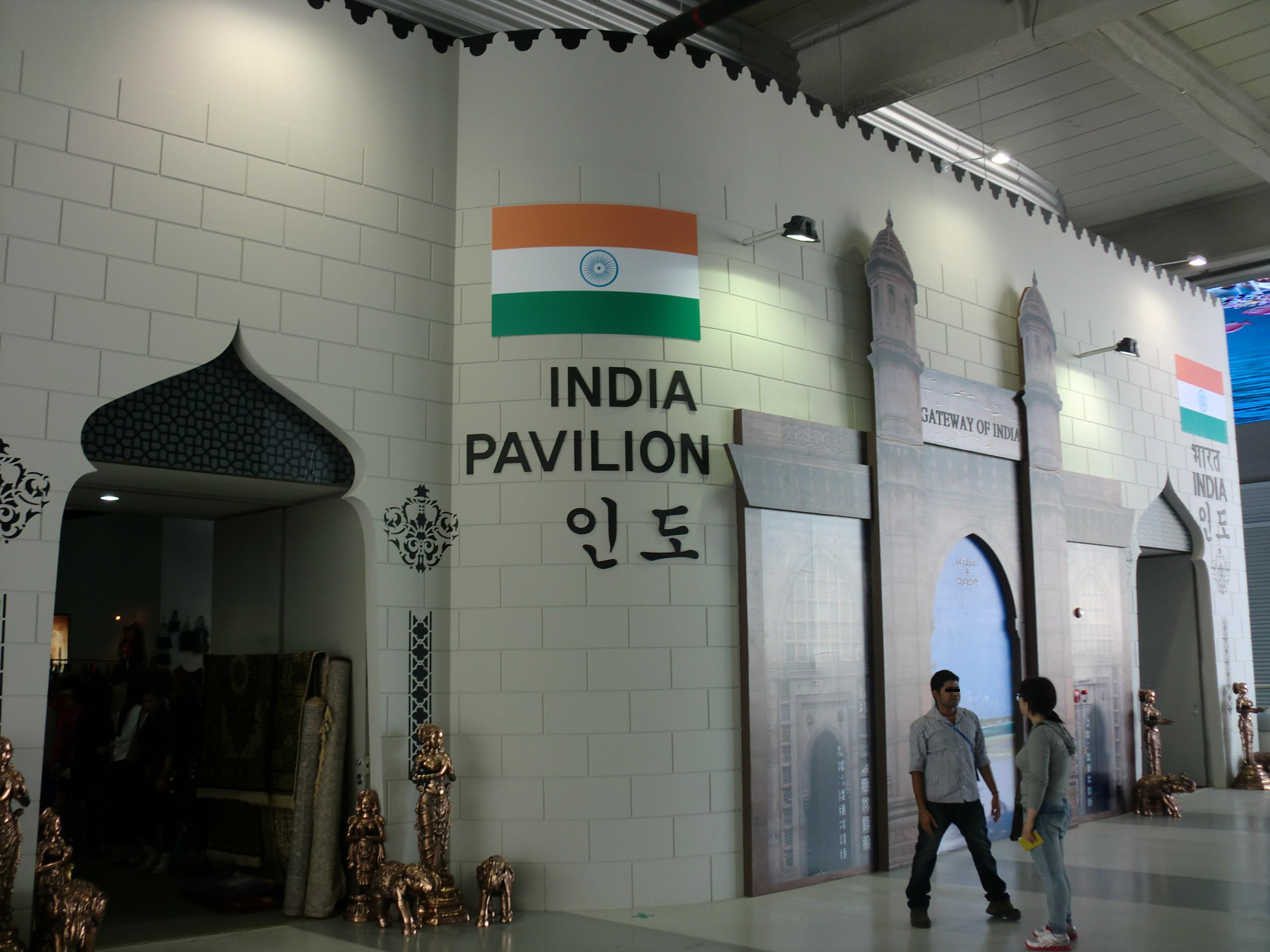
Nation	Individual pavilion	Building	Size	Notes	BIE award(s)
Antigua and Barbuda		A	D	Part of the Atlantic Ocean Joint Pavilion (West) pavilion
Algeria		C		Showed a video that related to the Sahara Desert
Angola		A		Showed a video with vibrating chairs, wind, etc. Performed a concert using traditional instrument
Argentina		B		Played music and showed tango
Armenia		A	D	Focusing on the Information ocean the Armenian pavilion introduced the WORLDLAB concept intended to become a platform for exploration of the next generation of scientific innovations. Part of the Atlantic Ocean Joint Pavilion (West) pavilion
Australia		D		A trisectional display covering Indigenous art, contemporary Australia and coastal living	Creative display bronze
Belgium		B		Gave cookies at the entrance, showed plastic surgery using chocolate, showed major national buildings that were designed like merry-go-around
Brunei		D	C	The Brunei exhibition was to consider the connections between forest and reef and include a large aquarium
Cambodia		D
China		D			Creative display gold
Colombia		A	D	Colombian Oceans: A Commitment from coast to coast. Part of the Atlantic Ocean Joint Pavilion (West) pavilion frontage
Democratic Republic of the Congo		B		Displayed wooden masks
Denmark		B		Displayed various Lego
Dominica		A	D
Dominican Republic		A	D
Egypt		A	C	Showed miniature pyramids and virtual crowns
France		B		Showed hourglass built into a wall, Showed fish tank that had many robot fish Jessiko, Performance by robot band Jessiko robot fish on France Pavilion at Yeosu 2012 World Expo ||
Gabon			D		Creative display gold
Germany		A		Entitled SEAVOLUTION the German pavilion comprised three sectors, coastal, biotope and treasure chamber explaining different aspects of sea and coastal life followed by fourth room with a main show. Approximately 430 000 people visited and it won the Gold Price for "best content related implementation of the Expo theme" Presented futuristic underwater exploration video
Grenada		A	D	The Grenadian booth showed the Molinere Underwater Sculpture Park and Grenada's yachting facilities
Guatemala		A	D	Part of the Atlantic Ocean Joint Pavilion (West) pavilion
Guyana		A	D	Part of the Atlantic Ocean Joint Pavilion (West) pavilion
Honduras		A	D	Part of the Atlantic Ocean Joint Pavilion (West) pavilion
India		A		Showed technique of low heat desalination India Pavilion
Indonesia		D		Showcasing the Indonesian marine biodiversity, displaying a rare specimen of Indonesian coelacanth, also use it as its mascot
Israel		B		Sea of inspiration was mostly an art installation. Showed clean glass lamps
Italy		B		Introduced to 2015 Milano Expo
Japan		D		Japan's pavilion focused on the tale of one boy coming to terms with the March 2011 tsunami in Japan
Kazakhstan		B		Note-taking after taking a photo, Emailed to visitors with their photos, Showed video after various performances
Lithuania		B	C	Showed ambers found near Baltic Sea	Creative display silver
Malaysia		D
Mexico		B	C	Showed video related to ancient Mayan civilization	Creative display bronze
Monaco		A		Outlined the work of the Monégasque royal family in protecting the Mediterranean sea Allowed participation of sign-up activity after a quiz
Netherlands		B		Played video related to 2002 World Cup
Nicaragua		A	D	Part of the Atlantic Ocean Joint Pavilion (West) pavilion
Nigeria		B		Displayed various wooden carvings
Norway		A		Called 25 148 Destination Norway the pavilion described its coastline, with the number 25148 relating to the length of Norway's coastline Showed a virtual trip video to Norway
Oman		C		4D experience, Detailed explanation of the exhibition	Theme development gold
Pakistan		A		Showed 3D hologram video that had Pakistani artifacts
Panama		A	D	Part of the Atlantic Ocean Joint Pavilion (West) pavilion
Papua New Guinea			D		Creative display bronze
Paraguay		A	D	Called The Land Where Water is Born this looked at Paraguay's waterways Part of the Atlantic Ocean Joint Pavilion (West) pavilion
Philippines		D	C	With a slogan of Island of Diversity – Seas of Connectivity the exhibit took corals as its starting point and focus to display the country's biodiversity. Recycled materials were used to build the pavilion. It received about 800 000 visitors.	Creative display and Theme development gold
Qatar		C		The Qatari pavilion explained its seafaring tradition and current efforts to preserver its maritime environment Allowed female visitors to experience henna
Romania		A		Gifted magnets to visitors, allowed visitors to virtually experience traditional clothing through use of monitors and cameras
Russia		B		The Russian exhibit had a slogan of Ocean and Man, A Way from the Past to the Future where visitors were to be shown scale models of a floating nuclear power plant and of a new-generation nuclear-powered icebreaker Showed video related to Arctic, Allowed visitors to experience sailing a ship using games
Saint Kitts and Nevis		A	D	Part of the Atlantic Ocean Joint Pavilion (West) pavilion
Seychelles			D		Creative display silver
Singapore		D		The showcasing ecologically sensitive city design under the clever title Paradox-ity: City of Contract exhibition demonstrated ecologically sensitive city design	Theme development silver
Spain		B		Showed a video that related seawater at different depths, Showed samples retrieved from deep seawaters
Sri Lanka		A		Displayed various jewel statues, Installed religion experiencing room
Suriname		A	D	Part of the Atlantic Ocean Joint Pavilion (West) pavilion
Sweden		A		An Archipelago of Ideas showed the country's innovation Explained Sweden's culture
Switzerland		A		Entitled The Source. It's in your hands it received 500,000 visitors Showed an old iceberg that was as old as South Korean history	Creative display gold
Tajikistan		A	D	Part of the Atlantic Ocean Joint Pavilion (West) pavilion
Tunisia		A	C	Displayed fish-shaped reed craft work, Displayed artworks
Turkey		A		Had a theme of "TURKEY: A Land of Civilizations Connecting Seas and Continents"; Showed aquariums and allowed visitors to experiment 3D effects.
Turkmenistan		B		Introduced to travel district that is currently under construction, Showed traditional hats
Uruguay		A		Displayed an underwater environment using illusion films	Theme development silver
United Arab Emirates		C		Phototaking using background that had drawings of underwater endangered species, Visitors were allowed to make their own fish	Creative display silver
United States		D		The pavilion had a series of films, including contributions from Barack Obama and Hillary Clinton and many Americans describing their own connections to the ocean
Vietnam		D	C		Theme development bronze

Other participating nations had displays in shared pavilions, with Oceania in A introducing different countries within Oceania; Pacific in B introducing different countries within Pacific Ocean and Indian Ocean in C showing different countries within Indian Ocean.

=== Theme Pavilion ===
The core concept of the Expo was "The Living Ocean and Coast". Human life not only embraces space, time, culture, science, technology, and occidental and oriental ideas, but also the ecosystems and humankind. In the tradition of previous expos (Zaragoza Expo's "Water", Lisbon Expo's "Sea", and "Future heritage"), the organizers of Expo 2012 Yeosu Korea have expressed an intention to innovate and progress beyond the concepts of the event's history.

=== Aquarium, the Marine Life Pavilion ===
Based upon the notion that marine life is the source of all life, the exhibition sought to present the diversity of the earth's marine resources, as well as the viability of their continuous use and development by humankind. Visitors observe the sea as a "treasure house" of biodiversity and, by highlighting our mutual relationship with the sea, the importance of preserving the marine environment is emphasized. The aquarium built in Expo 2012 is so far Korea's largest aquarium. It houses more than over 34,000 marine animals of 281 species and is divided into three main areas: Marine Life, Aqua Forest, and Ocean Life.

==== Marine Life ====
- This area mostly shows marine animals that live in coastal regions.
- Animals such as belugas, Baikal seals, penguins, otters, sea lions and elephant seals live here.

==== Aqua Forest ====
- One unexpected feature in the aquarium is the presence of artificially made Amazon Jungle.
- Although it does not completely mimic the actual jungle, it houses over 100 species of tropical creatures.

==== Ocean Life ====
- The last area has astonishing 360 view of the aquarium water tank.
- As visitors walk through the tunnel made up of transparent and durable materials, they can view the marine animals swimming above them.
- Unlike Marine Life area, it has over 200 species of marine animals, including huge sharks, rays, sardines, sea turtles and jellyfish from different oceans of the world.

Other than wondrous marine organisms, there is a 3D movie theater that shows short animation clip as well. Although aquarium is free-of-charge, 3D movie costs money to watch it. At one time, aquarium can only allow 1,620 people inside and takes 60 minutes on average to fully view it.

=== Expo Digital Gallery ===
One structure in Expo 2012 was the Expo Digital Gallery. Located between the international pavilions it was a gigantic LED screen attached at the bottom of the ceiling. It is a rectangular LED screen 218 meters wide and 30 meters long. This is equivalent to 6,324 units of 60 inch TVs. When pedestrians walked under the huge screen, they were able to see various animations played within the LED screen. Visitors with smartphones were able to take a picture, add a message, and send it to the screen so that it can be displayed on the screen.

=== Sky Tower ===
Two cement storage towers were transformed into the tallest structure of the Expo site and its observation deck offers panoramic views of the event grounds. It includes the acoustical signet of the Expo: The Vox Maris, a pipe organ that opened and closed every single Expo-day, it was also regularly used in concert play. Inside Sky Tower a new Korean technique produces fresh water from sea water and a panoramic cinema shows scenes of ocean life. The Sky Tower was elected as one of the top four major attractions of Yeosu Expo.

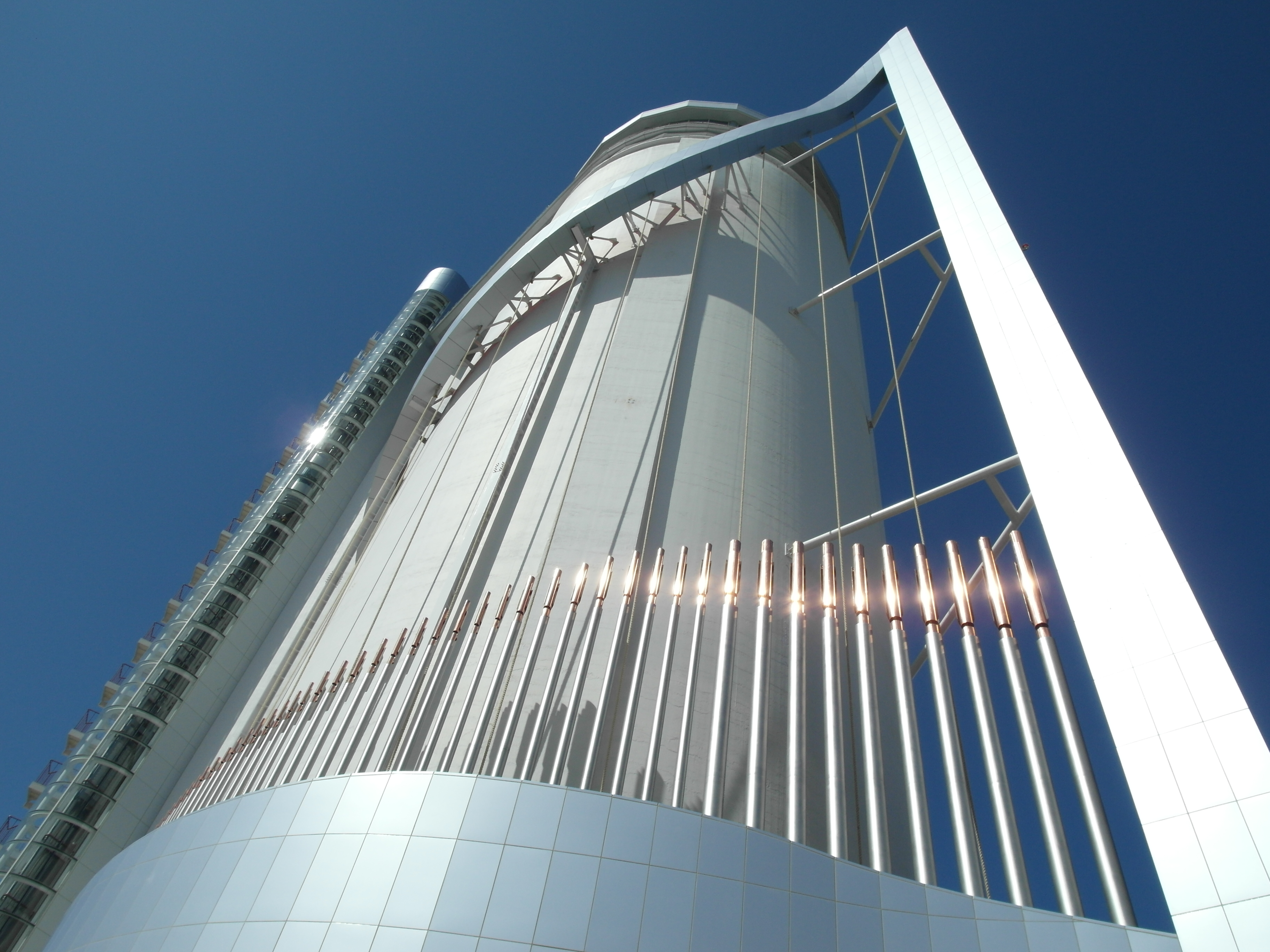
Vox Maris

=== Expo Town ===
The Expo Town was originally developed as an exemplary model of an ecologically-sound coastal city, for use as a testing ground for "green" home projects. The organizers modified this section to display ocean-themed "timeshares" and premium dwelling places for the future beyond the Expo.

=== Yeosu Declaration ===
Yeosu Declaration is to demand the international response to the situation such as pollution and overfishing, that preservation for the ocean and sustainable development is threatened. It emphasized the importance of international cooperation and feasible actions for solving problems in ocean. Yeosu Declaration was chosen during the Expo and supported by the international society which seeks sustainable development.

=== Yeosu Project ===
Under the Yeosu Project, the government of South Korea had planned to spend around $10 million to fund educational programs in developing countries and to fund the visit of professionals from developing countries to South Korea. This training and education was planned to focus on the protection of marine ecosystems and on sustainable development.

=== Performances ===
Other than pavilions and exhibition buildings, Yeosu Expo held various indoor and outdoor performances to further entertain its visitors. Such performances involved water shows, parades, concerts involving pop stars from other countries, movies, and theatricals. For each event, the location varies and has meaningful messages to portray to the audiences. Some are performed multiple times while others are performed once. These diverse events not only allow the visitors to enjoy their time to the fullest but also allow them to realize the reasons for holding Yeosu Expo 2012.

==== Water shows ====
- The Big-O Show: The Big-O show designed by ECA2 and WET Design was the main performance on water and it intended to be one of the must-watch performances in Yeosu Expo 2012. The show was not performed by people but rather by a gigantic donut-shaped machine capable of igniting explosive fires, spraying seawater, and shining lights of different colors at many directions. The machine is 120 meters wide and has 345 water nozzles. In addition, there are numerous small water fountains at the bottom that shot seawater upwards to more than 70 meters. The hollow circle in the middle of the machine is used to display the animated video. Instead of using a projector with a screen, the machine used holograms generated by the machine and water falling from top of the machine as the screen. Special effects such as the lights, water, and fire changed to match the mood of the video. The plot of the video involved a female protagonist exploring the sea. The main themes were peace, cooperation, and hope, and the video attempts to explain how sea is the origin of all life, how humans are polluting it for their own benefits, and what people can do in order to conserve it.^{[A]} The Big-O show was held once in the evening from Sunday to Thursday and twice on Friday and Saturday evenings. With few screenings and large demand, many people were waiting to see it. There are multiple security measures as well because there weren't enough seats.

== Events ==
- Kang Dong-suk, Chairman of the Organizing Committee for Expo 2012 Yeosu Korea visited the participating nations (October 6, 2010)
- Large-scale field lodging facility village established near Yeosu (October 6, 2010)
- 61 countries confirmed their participation (August 3, 2010)
- The seminar "New Sea and Green Economy" held by the Organizing Committee for Expo 2012 Yeosu Korea (July 22, 2010)
- The celebration for D-2 years held in Shanghai (May 17, 2010)

== See also ==
- International Exposition
- Taejŏn Expo '93
