= Hosam Maher Husein Smadi =

Jordanian terrorist (born 1990)

- Born: June 5, 1990 (age 36); Jordan
- Occupations: Gas station attendant, restaurant help
- Known for: Attempted to destroy Fountain Place, a 60 story building in Dallas, Texas
- Parent: Maher Smadi (father)
- Status: Incarcerated at USP Allenwood
- Conviction: Attempted use of a weapon of mass destruction (18 U.S.C. § 2332a)
- Penalty: 24 years imprisonment

Hosam Maher Husein Smadi (born June 5, 1990) is a citizen of Jordan who was arrested on suspicion of planning a terrorist bombing of Fountain Place, a building in Dallas, Texas, on September 24, 2009.

Smadi was in the United States illegally, and unaware he was under continuous surveillance, and that the other members of his "sleeper cell" were all Federal agents. The agents in his "sleeper cell" had supplied him with inert chemicals, so his bomb had not posed a real threat.

Smadi was provided with a fake bomb by FBI agents posing as members of al-Qaeda. He placed the device in the parking garage under the building and activated it with a cell phone. Instead of setting off a bomb, the cell phone rang a phone number at the FBI offices. Smadi pleaded guilty to attempted use of a weapon of mass destruction. Under the terms of a plea bargain, an additional charge of bombing a public place was dropped, and a sentence of not more than 30 years was recommended. On October 20, 2010, he was sentenced to 24 years imprisonment. He will be deported from the United States after serving his sentence. He's currently serving his sentence at USP Allenwood.

Immigration officials were trying to determine how Smadi was able to work at a gas station, since he only had a 2007 tourist visa.
