= Fountain Place =

Famous skyscraper in downtown Dallas Texas

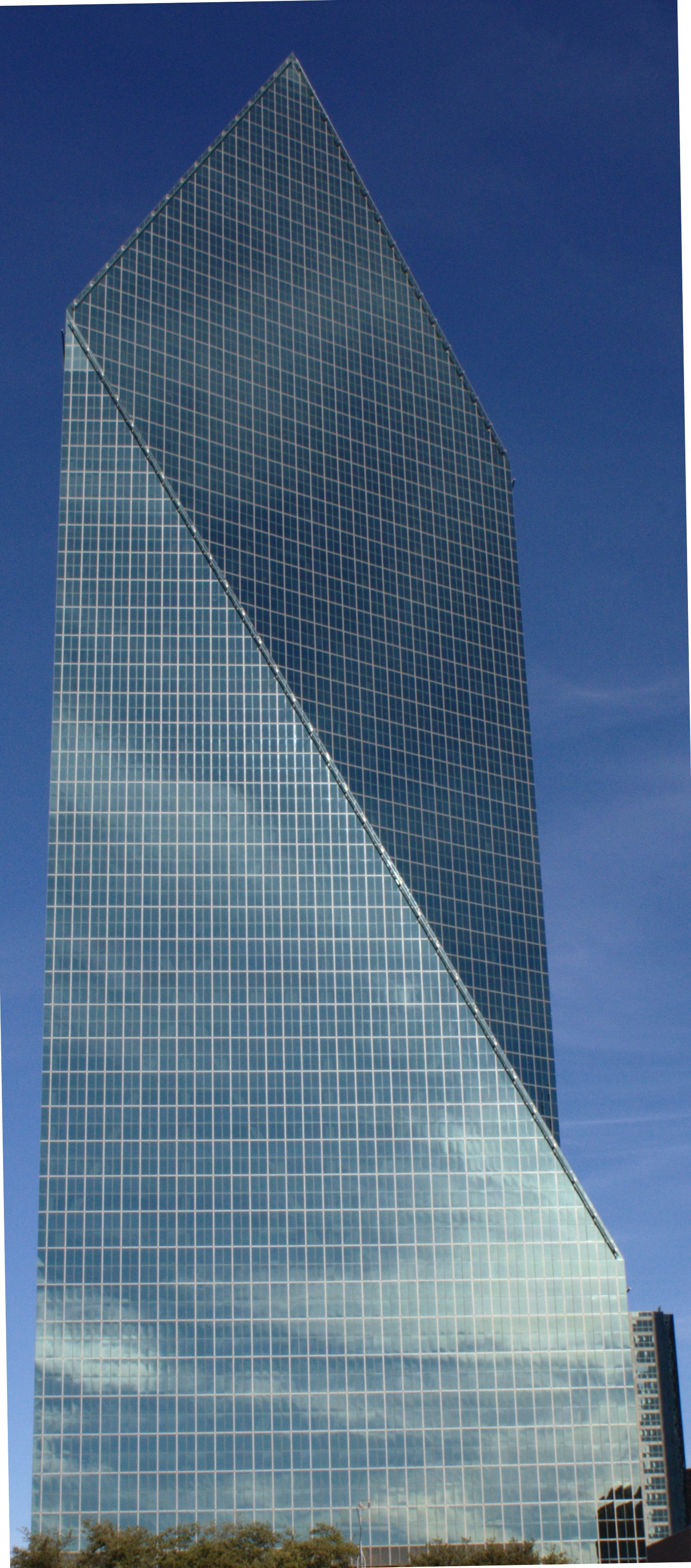
- Interactive map of the Fountain Place area
- Alternative names: First Interstate Tower; Allied Bank Tower

General information
- Type: Commercial offices
- Location: 1445 Ross Ave; Dallas, Texas
- Coordinates: 32.7844°N 96.8023°W
- Construction started: 1984
- Completed: 1986
- Cost: 300 million USD
- Owner: Goddard Investment Group

Height
- Roof: 219.5 m (720 ft)

Technical details
- Floor count: 63
- Floor area: 111,480 m^{2} (1,200,000 sq ft)
- Lifts/elevators: 30

Design and construction
- Architects: Pei Cobb Freed & Partners; Dan Kiley; Harry Weese Associates; WZMH Architects
- Developer: Criswell Companies
- Structural engineer: CBM Engineers, Inc. Cosentini Associates
- Main contractor: The Beck Group

Website
- fountainplace.com

Fountain Place is a 60-story late-modernist skyscraper in downtown Dallas, Texas. Standing at a structural height of 720 ft (220 m), it is the fifth-tallest building in Dallas, and the 15th-tallest in Texas. A new 45-story sibling tower, AMLI Fountain Place, has been built to its northwest on an adjacent lot.

== Design ==
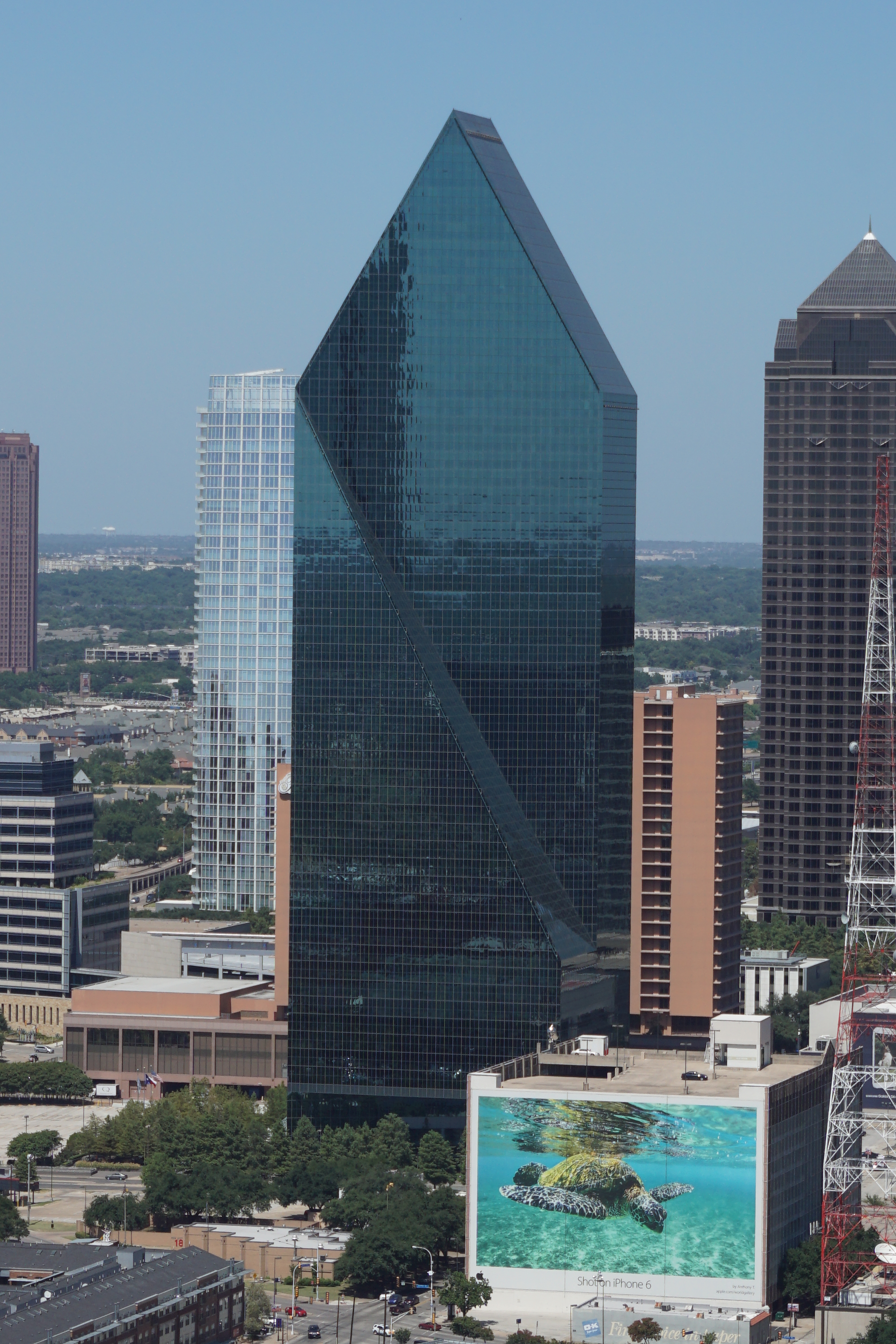
Fountain Place as viewed from Reunion Tower in August 2015

Original plans for the project called for twin towers, with the second tower rotated 90 degrees from the original, to be built across the garden on an adjacent lot, but with the collapse of the Texas oil, banking and real estate industry and the savings and loan scandal of the 1980s, the project was never completed.

The building was designed by the Pei Cobb Freed & Partners, Henry N. Cobb, Harry Weese Associates, and WZMH Architects, and was completed in 1986.

The building was named for the array of 172 dancing fountains in the plaza at its base with a fully automated water show as the centerpiece. The fountains were an extreme undertaking and the first concept of their kind on such a large scale. WET Design company was brought in to facilitate the project; it was the company's first major project since the founders left Disney to team up. WET collaborated with the firm of I. M. Pei as well as landscape architects Dan Kiley and Peter Ker Walker to create the waterscape of Fountain Place (at Allied Bank Tower) in Dallas, Texas. The project showed the first use of WET's patented open-jointed paving in a fountain where shots of water appear from the openings in the plaza's surface. After completion of Fountain Place, WET went on to design other notable fountains such as the Bellagio fountains in Las Vegas and The Dubai Fountain.

The building was designed as a large, multi-faceted prism. Its various slanted sides cause the building to have a completely different profile from all directions.

The sibling tower, AMLI Fountain Place, consists of 367 residential units above nine stories of parking. Its architect, Page Southerland Page, Inc., intended its exterior design to echo that of the original office tower, calling to mind the planned but never realized twin tower. Upon its completion, it was the tallest skyscraper built in Dallas since the Chase Building.

== History ==
At the time of its opening, it was the second tallest building in the city, behind Bank of America Plaza. However, upon completion of the Comerica Bank Tower and the Chase Tower, it fell to fourth-tallest. The post-completion addition of an antenna spire to the Renaissance Tower relegated Fountain Place to its current spot at fifth on the list.

On September 24, 2009, the FBI arrested 19-year-old Hosam Maher Husein Smadi of Jordan for an alleged attempt to bomb the skyscraper. Smadi was living and working in Italy, Texas, and had been under FBI investigation for some time.

== Tenants ==
Fountain Place was the headquarters of Tenet Healthcare until 2020. Tenet Healthcare announced in 2008 that it was moving from the northern suburban areas of Dallas to Fountain Place due to high gasoline prices and the revitalization of downtown Dallas. Trevor Fetter, the company's then president and chief executive, credited the Dallas Area Rapid Transit light rail and the concept of an urban location for his decision to move to Downtown Dallas.

Fountain Place contains many financial institutions and offices including Wells Fargo. Originally cited as First Interstate Tower or Allied Bank Tower, it was after the 1988 merger of Wells Fargo that the building became known as Fountain Place, becoming the only major skyscraper in Dallas not to lend its name to the occupying bank.

The top two levels of Fountain Place are occupied by Dallas Architecture Firm, Rouch Architects.

Fountain Place also serves as Region 6 headquarters for the U.S. Environmental Protection Agency.

Hunt Oil operated out of Fountain Place until they built new headquarters across the street in 2007.

In 2020, Omnichannel Insurtech company Integrity Marketing Group renovated and moved into 12 floors becoming the building’s largest tenant.

== In popular culture ==
In seasons 10–14 of Dallas, exterior shots of the building were used for the offices of Bobby Ewing's Petro Group Dallas, which later became Ewing Oil, and features greatly in the TV Series: Walker Texas Ranger.

The building can be seen in some scenes in the 1987 science fiction movie RoboCop.

The building's dancing fountains were used for scenes in the movie Blank Check.

Exterior shots of the building are seen in the USA Network TV series Queen of the South.

== AMLI Fountain Place ==
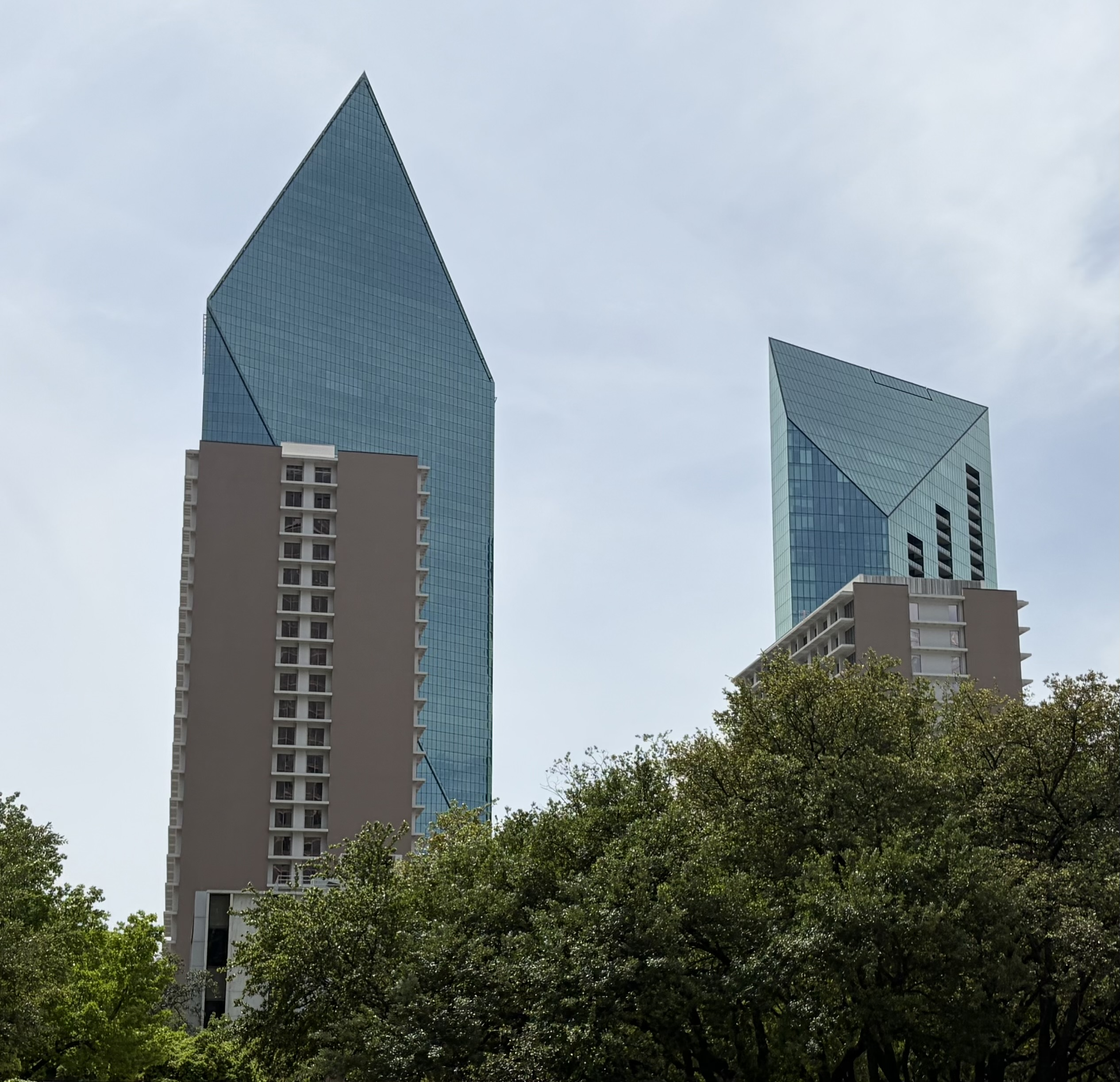
Fountain Place (left) and AMLI Fountain Place (right) in 2026

AMLI Fountain Place is a 562 ft. (171 m) residential skyscraper that neighbors Fountain Place. It was designed by architecture firm Page. In 2019 it was under construction, and had been projected to be completed in 2020. The project was first proposed in 2016, to remove the parking space on Fountain Place's west side. The project will also be the first project since the proposed Ross Perot Tower to occupy the parking lot. The original design called for twin buildings of Fountain Place, however because of the oil crisis/decline, the twin was never built. The twin building was projected to be built parallel to the parking lot.

AMLI Fountain Place has brought in 367 apartments that rise 46 stories.

== See also ==
- List of tallest buildings in Dallas
- Tallest buildings in Texas
- List of tallest buildings in the United States
