= Fountains of Bellagio =

Attraction at the Bellagio resort on the Las Vegas Strip

Coordinates: 36.112904°N 115.173866°W

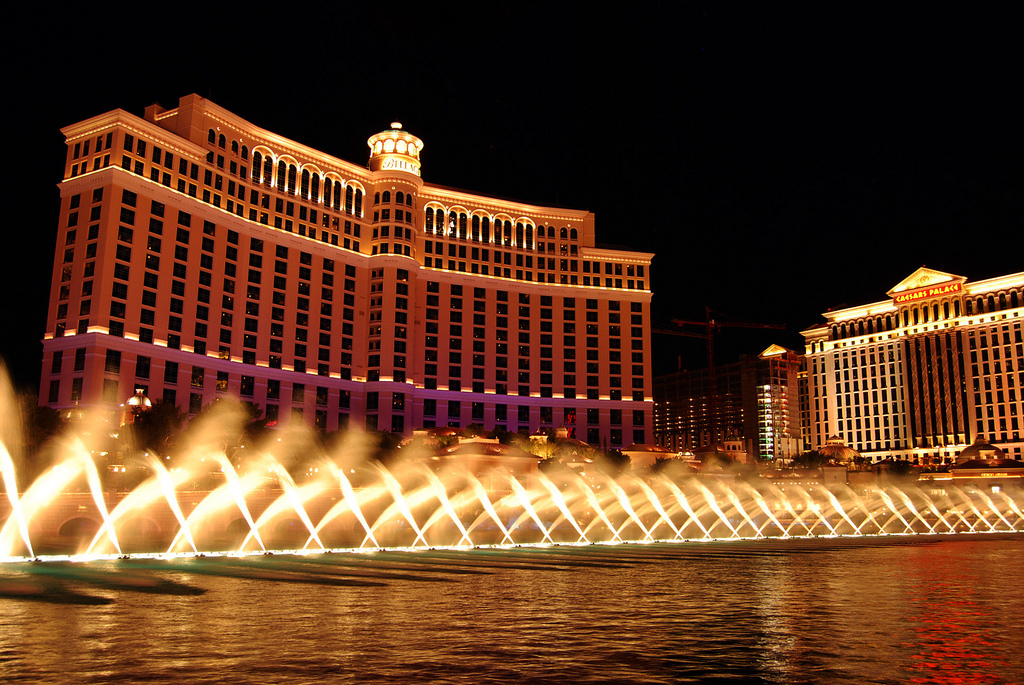
Bellagio fountain show at night

Fountains of Bellagio (/bəˈlɒʒi.oʊ/ bə-LAH-zhi-oh) is a free attraction at the Bellagio resort, located on the Las Vegas Strip in Paradise, Nevada. It consists of a musical fountain show performed in an 8.5-acre (3.4 ha) man-made lake in front of the resort. The show uses 1,214 water nozzles and 4,792 lights. The fountains shoot as high as 460 feet (140 m). Stages are sometimes built on the lake to host events, such as musical performances, that incorporate the fountain show.

It was conceived by owner Steve Wynn, and built by the design firm WET. Work began on the fountain show in 1995, and it opened with the resort on October 15, 1998. The attraction was built for $40 million, making it one of the most expensive fountains in the world. The Fountains of Bellagio have appeared in numerous films. It is a signature attraction for Las Vegas, and one of the most photographed places in the United States. It was the largest fountain show in the world until The Dubai Fountain opened in 2009.

== History ==
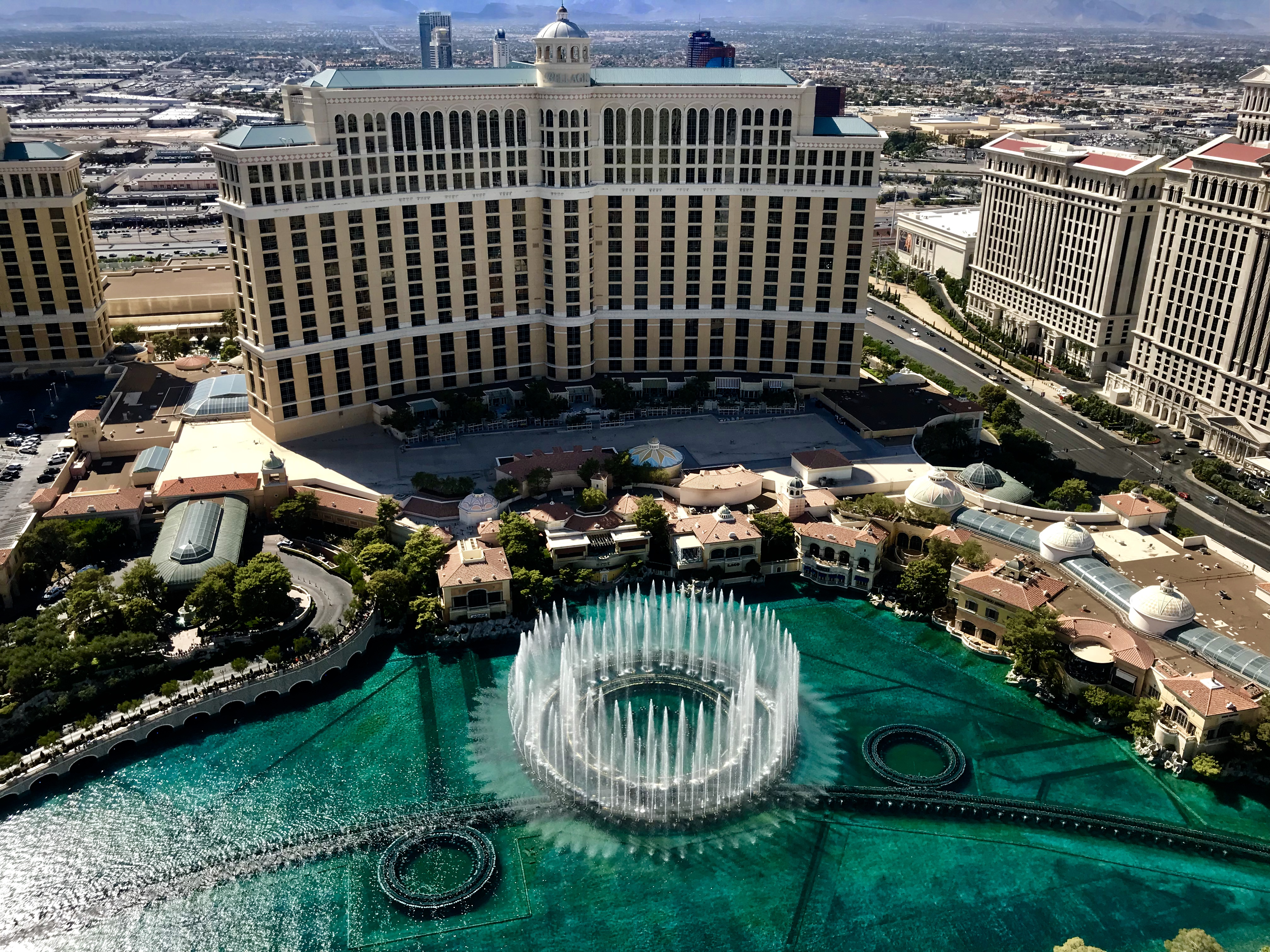
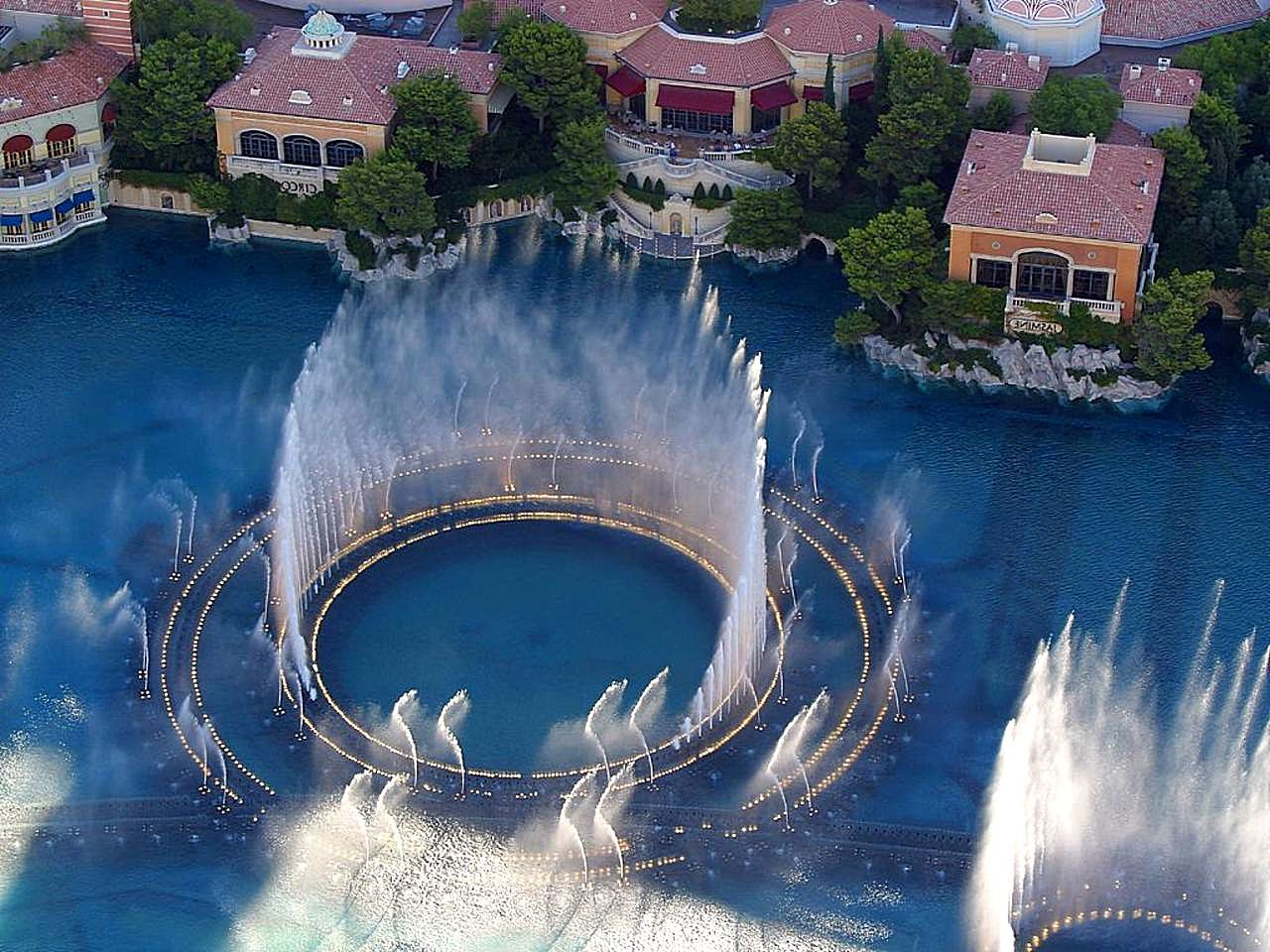
Aerial views of the fountain show

The Fountains of Bellagio opened on October 15, 1998, along with the Bellagio resort, both built on the former site of the Dunes hotel-casino. The shows take place in a man-made lake in front of the resort. The Bellagio and its fountain attraction were conceived by casino owner Steve Wynn. The attraction was created by the design firm WET, which had never created such a large project before. Work began on the attraction in 1995, and it was completed at a cost of $40 million. It was one of the most expensive fountains in the world.

The fountains are among the most photographed places in the United States. It was the largest fountain show in the world until The Dubai Fountain, also by WET, was opened in 2009. After leaving the Bellagio in 2000, Wynn would later include a water show at his Wynn Macau and Wynn Palace resorts.

More than 240,000 fountain shows had been performed at the Bellagio as of October 2018. A new edition of the show, promoting the final season of Game of Thrones, was unveiled in 2019 and ran for two weeks. Scenes from the television show were projected onto a wall of water formed by the fountains, and new technology was installed to shoot flames up from the surface of the water. Music from the series was also incorporated into the fountain show.

The Fountains of Bellagio have been closed on several occasions, for instance during a three-day power outage at the resort in 2004. Shows are also canceled if winds reach 25 miles per hour. As of 2005, only five shows had ever been canceled because of technical problems. The show was temporarily closed in March 2020, amid the COVID-19 pandemic. It returned two and a half months later.

On March 1, 2026, pro-democracy Iranian-Americans residents, along with Las Vegas Iranian Volunteers, rallied outside of the fountains in support of military action by the United States and Israel.

== Show overview ==
Video of the fountain show at night

The shows are widely visible and are typically viewed from the sidewalk along the Las Vegas Strip. Shows are free and usually performed every half-hour from the afternoon until midnight. A terrace overlooking the fountains has become a popular wedding spot, with the show coordinated to begin as couples kiss.

=== Fountains ===
The fountains are controlled through computer programming. A control room overlooks the lake from a tower, and is staffed by an engineer who pushes a button to commence the fountain show. Water can be shot as high as 460 feet, up from 240 feet when the show debuted. Water is shot up using compressed air at a pressure of up to 500 pounds per square inch. Ten compressors are used to power the fountains. Wind is taken into consideration and the fountains are adjusted if necessary, to keep the show synchronized and prevent pedestrians from getting wet.

The show uses 1,214 water nozzles, which are divided into four types: oarsmen, mini-shooters, super-shooters, and extreme-shooters. Oarsmen shoot water 77 feet in the air. The lake contains 208 oarsmen, each one capable of moving 140 gallons a minute. To meet the resort's opening deadline, WET subcontracted some of the work. The oarsmen were created by Sarcos, which was to manufacture them at a cost of $12,000 each. However, the cost more than doubled, due to unexpected challenges in their design and engineering. The oarsmen were designed to last five years, but were still in use as of 2017, thanks to maintenance and improvements made by the show's team. The oarsmen were mostly made of mild steel, and a tar-based coating of paint wore off after the first year. The team removed all the oarsmen and sandblasted them before applying powder coating.

The lake also contains 798 mini-shooters, 192 super-shooters and 16 extreme-shooters, respectively capable of shooting water 100, 240 and 460 feet high. The extreme-shooters were added in 2005. Regular maintenance takes place on the equipment. For instance, barnacles are routinely sandblasted off of the fountain mechanisms. The attraction has 4,792 fountain lights. Wynn considered using colored fountain lights, before settling on white ones, which he found more elegant. Soft water, stored in tanks, is used for fog effects.

=== Music ===
The water is choreographed by WET to match accompanying music and songs, which are emitted by 183 speakers built into lampposts. Thirty additional speakers are used only for the bells of a bell tower. Upon its debut, the fountain show included music from composer Gerard Schurmann and choreography by Kenny Ortega. Choreography for the initial dozen songs took two months to complete, as each nozzle and light needed to be programmed individually. It can take up to a week to choreograph two minutes' worth of music. The choreography for each song is stored on computers.

Each show uses different music, and a variety of genres are featured, including pop and rock. The most popular song is "Time to Say Goodbye" by Andrea Bocelli and Sarah Brightman. Other music includes "The Pink Panther Theme" by Henry Mancini and "Viva Las Vegas" by Elvis Presley. Some songs only play at the end of the year for the Christmas holiday. New songs are occasionally introduced into the catalog. Three were added in 2011, including "Lucy in the Sky with Diamonds" by The Beatles, "Billie Jean" by Michael Jackson, and "In the Mood" by Glenn Miller. It was the first time in six years that new songs were added to the show.

Electronic music was introduced in 2014, with three songs by Tiësto. Other new songs have included Cher's "Believe" in 2018, and Lady Gaga's "Bad Romance" in 2019. In October of the same year, the resort featured a special show set to the Friends theme song "I'll Be There for You" by The Rembrandts, to mark the show's 25th anniversary. In 2022, the resort unveiled another new fountain show set to the music of boy band BTS. More than 160,000 people had seen the show within four days of its opening. In 2023, to mark its 25th anniversary, the resort debuted a new show featuring "Perfect Symphony", by Ed Sheeran and Bocelli. The following year, a guest won the opportunity to choreograph his own show, which is set to "Beautiful Day" by U2.

== Lake ==
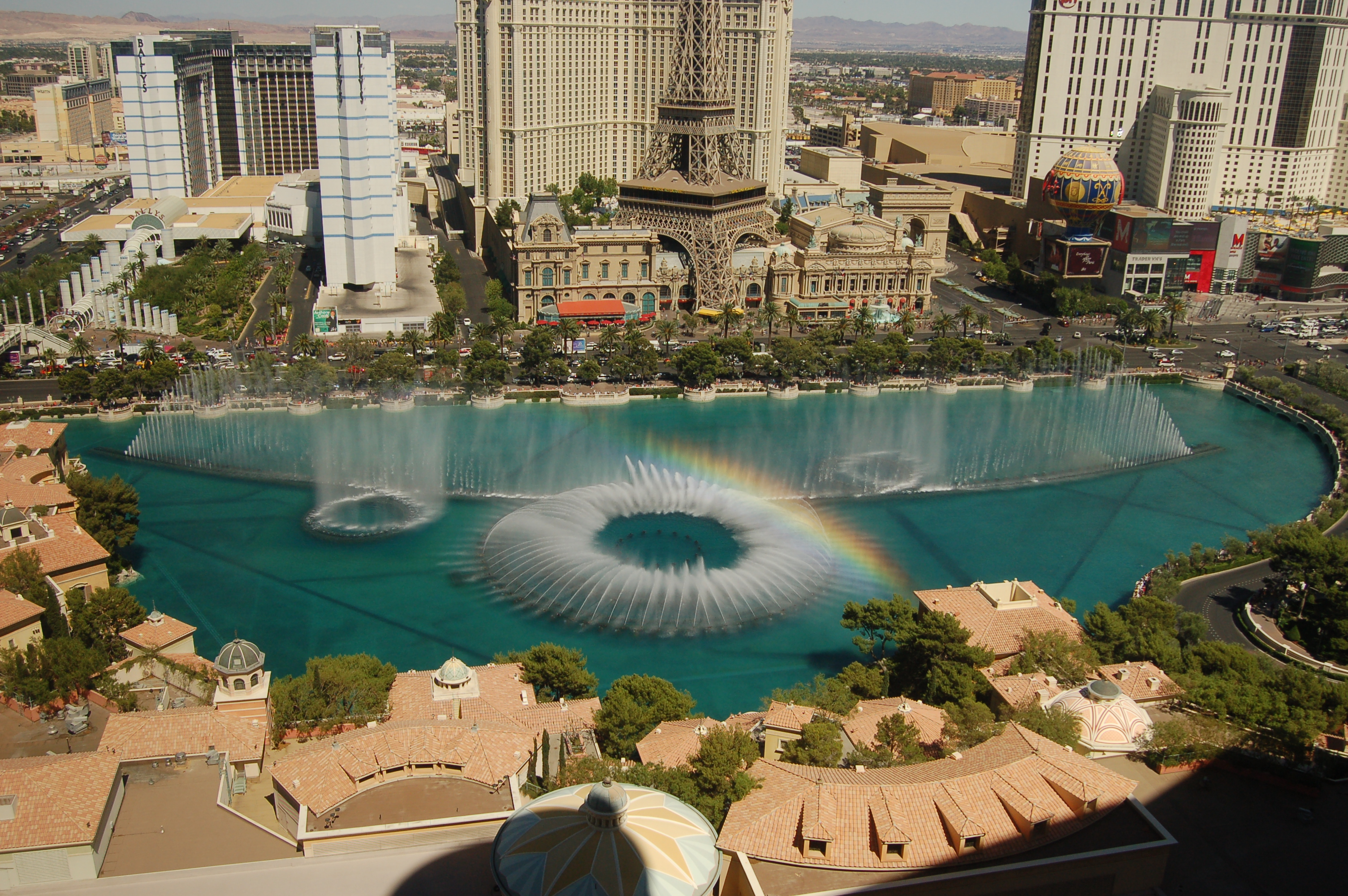
Overlooking the lake from the Bellagio hotel

The lake is sometimes referred to as Lake Bellagio or Lake Como. It is loosely based on northern Italy's Lake Como, located near the village of Bellagio, Lombardy. The lake is 8.5 acres. It measures 1,200 feet by 600 feet, and its depth ranges from 4 to 13 feet. The lake contains 22 million gallons of water. It is partly filled with well water, which was previously used for the Dunes golf course. The lake uses two-thirds of the water previously used for the course. Water from the resort's aquatic show, O, also drains into the lake.

Approximately 12 million gallons are used each year for the fountain shows, and the lake uses roughly 500 pounds of chlorine per day. Several restaurants at the Bellagio resort are situated to overlook the lake. The water temperature ranges from 50 degrees in the winter to 85 degrees in the summer. It is frequented by ducks, some of which have made it their permanent home.

The operating and maintenance team works in a hidden cavern known as the Batcave, located within a fake rock formation beside the lake. The Batcave contains four equipment rooms. The team consists of 30 people, including computer technicians, electricians, and welders. Due to the amount of time spent in the water, all team members are trained scuba divers.

Various items are thrown or dropped into the lake from bystanders, including food, keys, cellphones, lingerie, casino chips, military coins, foreign coinage, and wedding rings. The lake's filtration system is capable of cleaning five million gallons per day. Every few weeks, a barge resembling an ice resurfacer is used to clean the lake's bottom and retrieve foreign objects. Coins recovered from the lake are donated to charities. Approximately two tons of coins are recovered each year. There have been several instances of people jumping into the lake, including a homeless man who drowned in 2020.

In 2004, to promote a Victoria's Secret model tour, the lake was temporarily turned pink with the use of gels on the lenses of the underwater lights.

== Events and performances ==
Stages are sometimes set up on the lake for events or musical performances that incorporate the dancing fountains. Britney Spears performed on the lake for the 2001 Billboard Music Awards, and Drake did the same during the 2017 Billboard Music Awards. Panic! at the Disco performed in 2018.

In a 2010 publicity stunt to promote his airline, Richard Branson rode a jet ski across the lake to reach a floating platform, where he served as conductor to the dancing fountains.

A kabuki show by Shochiku was performed on the lake for several days during 2015. It used the largest stage ever built on the water, measuring 165 feet.

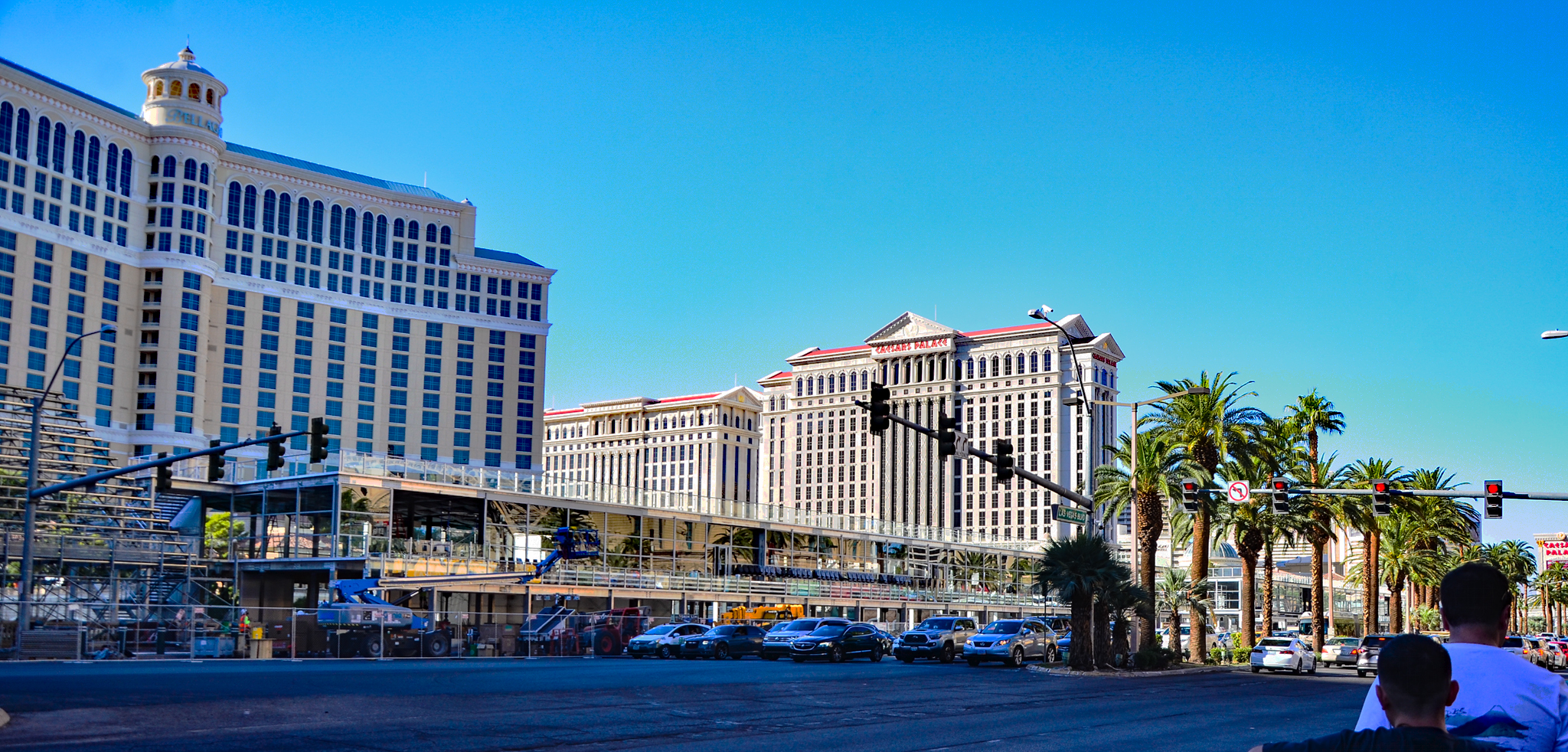
Bellagio Fountain Club during construction, 2023

The lake was scheduled to host a portion of the 2020 NFL draft. A floating red-carpet stage was to be constructed on the lake, with players transported there by boat. However, these plans were canceled due to the pandemic, with the draft being held through videoconferencing instead. Las Vegas was subsequently awarded the 2022 NFL draft, which featured the return of the floating stage concept on the Bellagio lake. The fountains were also incorporated into the 2022 NHL All-Star Skills Competition, which took place on the lake.

The Bellagio Fountain Club, a temporary facility consisting of bar, restaurant and nightclub space, was built in front of the lake to accompany the inaugural Las Vegas Grand Prix in 2023. The club is set to return each year in conjunction with future Grand Prix events. The fountain show was originally accompanied by more than 40 trees along the Strip sidewalk, providing shade to pedestrian spectators. The trees were removed to accommodate the Bellagio Fountain Club, and approximately 12 were returned following the facility's initial dismantling.

== Reception ==
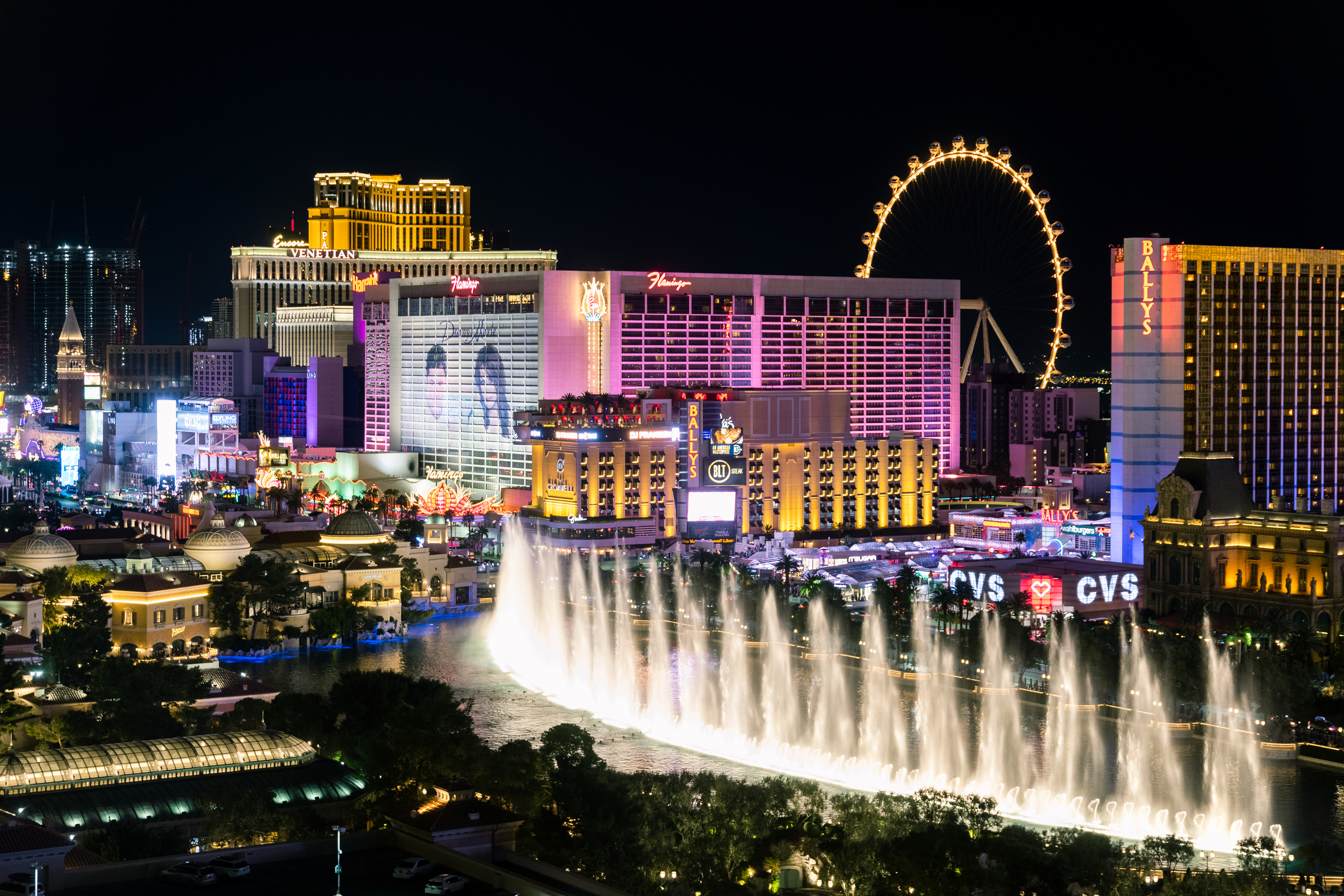
View of the fountain show and Las Vegas Strip, 2019

In 2012, the Fountains of Bellagio were included on TripAdvisor's list of "most talked about attractions" from around the world, based on tourist reviews. It was one of 16 attractions featured on the list. In TripAdvisor's 2013 Travelers' Choice awards, the fountains were ranked the number-one tourist attraction in the U.S. and number 12 worldwide.

In 2020, Las Vegas Weekly named it the city's best attraction, writing, "Today, it's impossible to imagine the Strip without it". Emerald Pellot of Yahoo! also considered it one of Las Vegas' top attractions.

== In popular culture ==
Numerous films have featured the Fountains of Bellagio, including What Planet Are You From? (2000), Ocean's Eleven (2001), Lucky You (2007), Bolt (2008), The Hangover Part III (2013), Jason Bourne (2016), and Sharknado: The 4th Awakens (2016).

The Fountains of Bellagio also appear in the music video for "24K Magic", in which singer Bruno Mars rides a jet ski across the lake while the fountains dance.

In 2019, Celine Dion and James Corden performed on the lake, singing "My Heart Will Go On" while riding on a boat past the dancing fountains. The performance, reenacting a scene from the film Titanic (1997), was part of Corden's Carpool Karaoke segment on The Late Late Show.

== Incidents ==
On June 8, 2025, a YouTuber named Finny Da Legend and his partner were killed when another man - also believed to be a YouTuber - opened fire upon them while they were streaming at the Bellagio fountains. As many as 7 gunshots could be heard on the livestream. A police officer responding to the scene was able to shut the livestream off.
