= Kangwon Land =

South Korean company

Kangwon Land Inc.
- Native name: 주식회사 강원랜드 (Korean)
- Type: Public State-owned Enterprise
- Traded as: KRX: 035250; KRX 100 Component
- Industry: Real Estate Development
- Founded: June 29, 1998
- Headquarters: 265 High1-gil, Jeongseon-gun, Gangwon Province
- Key people: Hahm Sung-hee (CEO)
- Owner: Ministry of Trade, Industry and Energy, through Mine Reclamation Corporation (36.27%); Provincial Government of Gangwon-do, through Gangwon-do Development Corporation (6.11%); National Pension Service (5.58%)
- Number of employees: 3,693 (2024)
- Subsidiaries: High1 Entertainment Inc. High1 Sangdong Theme Park Inc. High1 Choochoo Park Inc.

Korean name
- Hangul: 강원랜드
- RR: Gangwon raendeu
- MR: Kangwŏn raendŭ
- Website: Kangwonland.high1.com

Kangwon Land (Korean: 강원랜드) is a South Korean casino and resort company based in Gangwon Province, South Korea. The company develops abandoned mines, and builds gaming and entertainment facilities. Kangwon Land operates a number of game tables and slot machines for domestic and international customers under its gaming licenses.

== History ==
Kangwon province, where Kangwon Land is located, was well known as a coal mining area. It once experienced a "coal rush" when coal was used as a major national energy source during the 1970s to 1980s. The Kangwon province had experienced devastating economic downturns since coal was replaced by gas and oil in the 90s. The Korean government tried to introduce several alternatives to revitalize the local economy, but the community repeatedly and vigorously requested a domestic casino, and it became authorized in December 1995.

In October 2000, when Kangwon Land first opened to Korean citizens as well as to international tourists, it had one hotel with 199 rooms and a casino that had only 30 table games and 480 slot machines.

Kangwon Land operates two hotels with 674 rooms, two condominiums with 403 rooms, an 18-hole golf course, a ski resort with 18 slopes, and a casino with 132 table games and 960 slot machines on 2,800 acres of land. The effort to diversify sales continues today, as Kangwon Land is constructing a new convention hotel and 2 more condominiums. A new water park is scheduled to open in 2015 to complete the family-oriented year round comprehensive resort.

Kangwon Land offers scholarship to students in abandoned mine areas and also spends 2 billion won each year to treat pneumoconiosis patients and support their livelihood.

== Kangwon Land Casino ==
Kangwon Land
- 강원랜드 (Korean)
- Interactive map of Kangwon Land
- Location: 265 High1-gil, Jeongseon-gun, Gangwon-do
- Opened: October 2000
- No. of rooms: 676
- Permanent shows: Magical Box
- Signature attractions: Multimedia Fountain
- Notable restaurants: World Fusion Restaurant, Mint Bar, Restaurant PANGE, Crystal Lounge, Summitas Club & Lounge, Free drinks bar
- Casino type: Land
- Architect: Wimberly Allison Tong & Goo
- Website: High1.com

Kangwon Land Casino is located at the foot of High1 Ski and Golf Resort in Sapuk-eup, Jeongseongun, South Korea. It is the largest casino in the country and accounts for about half of the total gambling revenue annually. Kangwon Land Casino is currently the only Korean casino that allows the country's citizens to play, but also caters to a high number of foreign visitors.

The casino itself covers a gross floor area of 27,291 square meters and houses 200 gaming tables and 1,360 slots and video gambling machines. The Summitas Club is a special place of distinction for casino VIPs only and is open from 10am until 6am seven days a week.

- Table games varieties: Blackjack, Baccarat, Roulette, Big Wheels – 5 kinds.
- Slot machines varieties: 480 slot machines – 99 kinds
- Age limit: from age 19 and up (verification of identity is mandatory)
- Taking pictures in the casino and/or admission after drinking alcohol is strictly forbidden

== High1 Resort ==
High1 is one of Korea's most famous and popular ski and leisure resorts, located between Gohan and Sabuk in Jeongseon County, Gangwon Province. The resort spans most of Gohan mountains and stretches into nearby Sabuk.

== High1 CC ==
High1 CC is a high-elevation, 72-par golf course with 18 holes. It is situated at the High1 Resort near Kangwon Land Casino at an elevation of 1,137m above sea level. The course is over 6,500 meters long. Many amenities are offered at High1 CC, including a 200-meter practice range, a tea house located near the 4th and 14th holes, and a start house offering snacks and drinks as well as an integrated sauna and swimming pool.

== Multimedia Fountain Kangwon Land ==
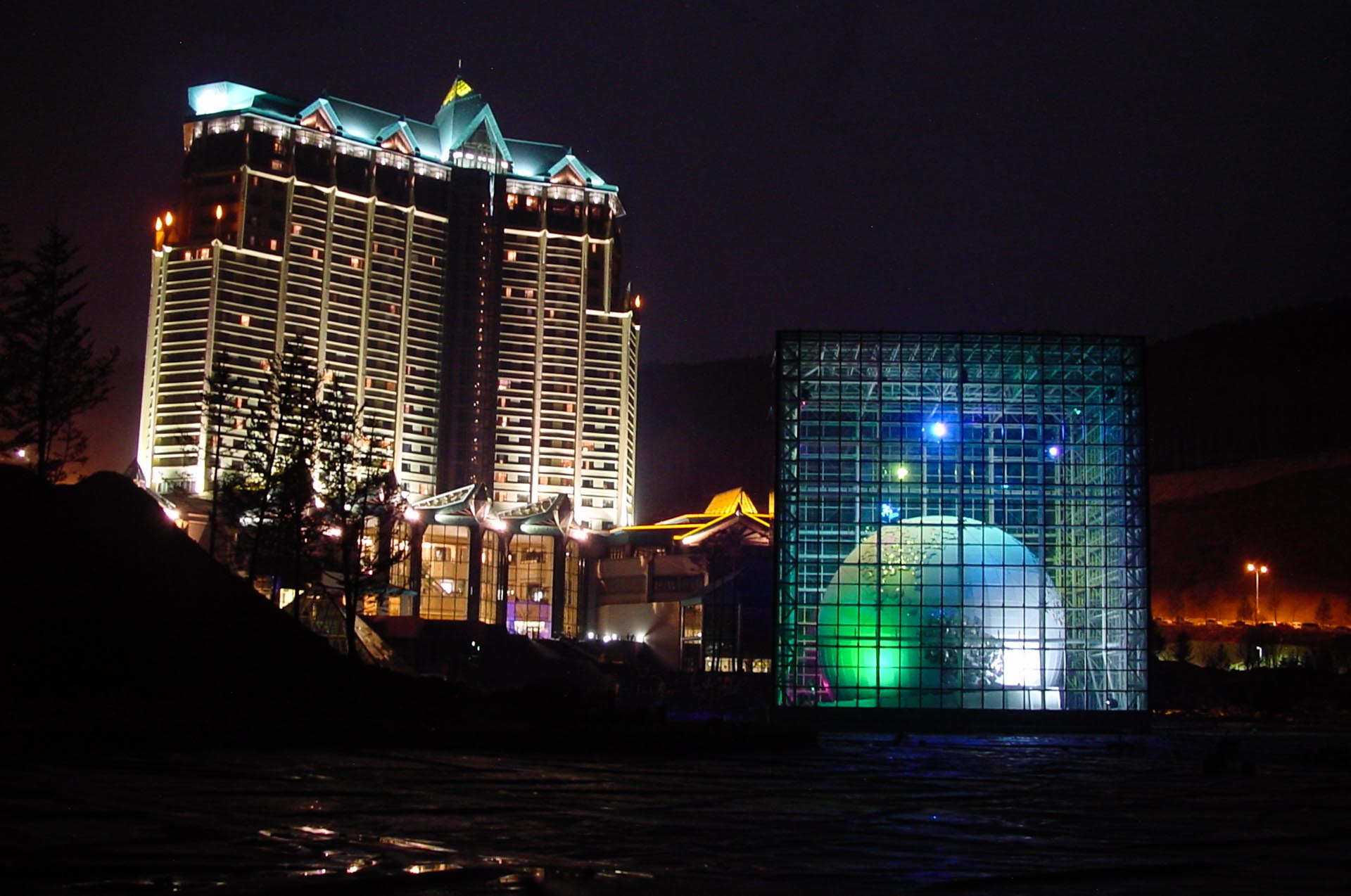
Kangwon Land Resort and Magical Box

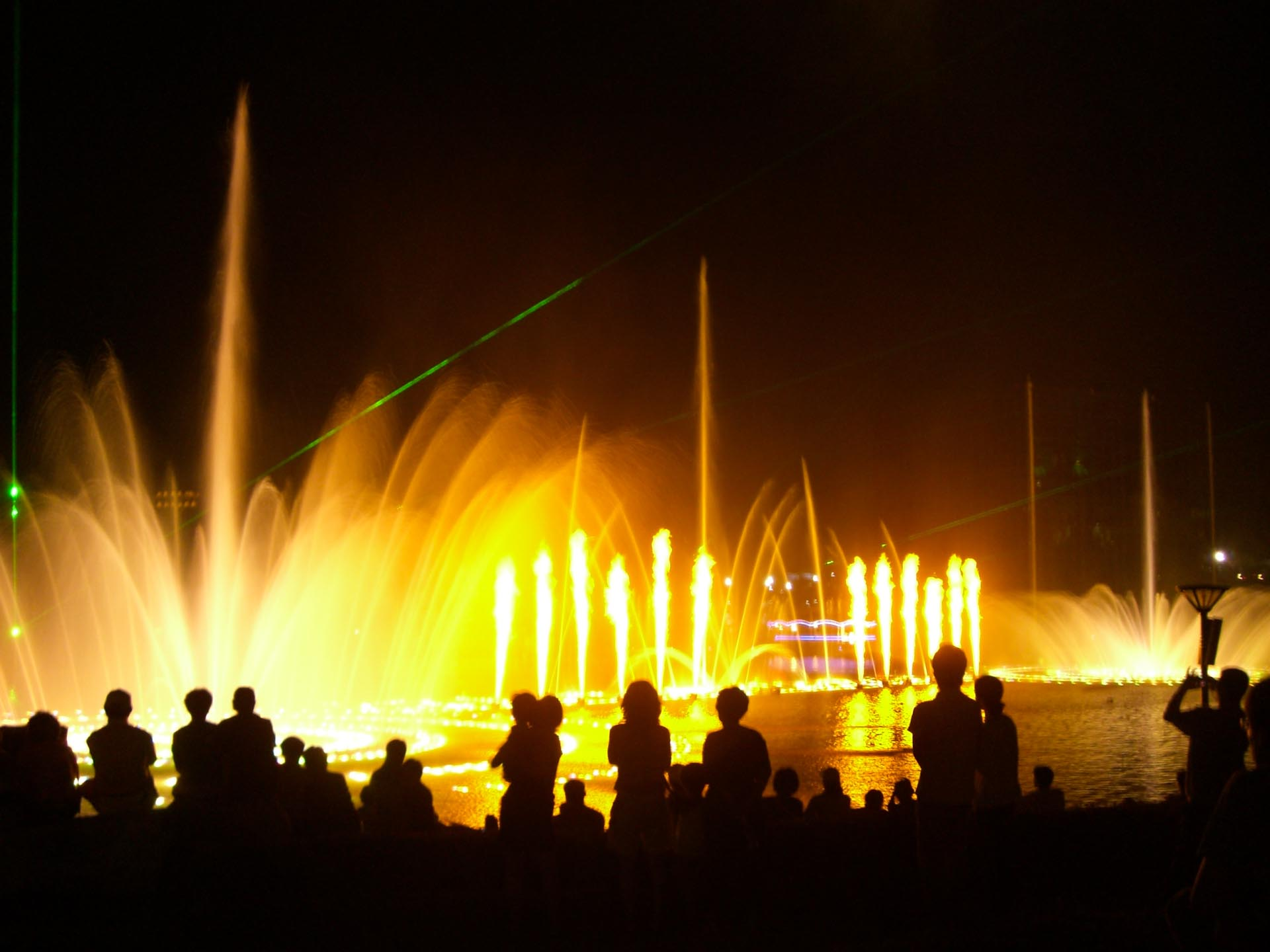
Multimedia Fountain Show Kangwon Land Resort

Multimedia Fountain works in spring, summer and fall. Multimedia Fountain Kangwon Land is considered Asia's largest musical fountain. The project design and development was performed by Emotion Media Factory, a Germany-based company responsible for the dancing fountains in Chiang Mai Night Safari Park (Thailand) and Vinnytsia Fountain Roshen (Ukraine) as well as the multimedia shows for AIDA Cruises.

The Magical Box multimedia fountain show consists of the big cube system and the fountain. In combination with the fountain during daylight hours, the box appears mirrored, but at night it is illuminated to reveal its interior. At night a globe can be seen, some 20 meters in diameter. The special lighting effects give the impression that the globe is rotating and displays the five continents of the world.

Inside the globe is the "Dome Cinema". The "Dome Cinema" has a diameter of 18 meters and is used as the projection area. Video images from TV, DVD, or VHS sources are projected directly into the dome. These images fill almost two thirds of the space. As a result of the various depths of the room, a new laser video system is used to ensure that the images are not distorted. Outside the "Miracle World Box" is the largest fully automatic screen (24 m x 24 m) in the world. The screen uses lighting effects, laser projections and synchronized choreographies for its displays.

All the technology used in and around the "Miracle World Box" was designed, developed and installed by Emotion Media Factory in August 2007.

Multimedia system consists of 180m water fountains, water screen, video, light, 12 multi-coloured fire units, and laser.

== Attractions ==
The Arari Village Theme Park is an exhibition area where visitors can stay a few days and see what the people were like in a rural village during the Joseon period. In addition to mementos like Seo-nang-dang (a shrine in honor of a deity) and Jang-seung (totem poles) located at the entrance to the village, Yeon-ja-bang-a (a millstone usually worked by an ox) and a farming tool workshop display, the theme park is designed to show how the people living in this area were engaged in their community. Traditional houses in the theme park were built on the basis of meticulous historical research.

Lumi Arte which starts from the sculpture park trail and ends at the lake is one of the most popular night sightseeing attractions in High1 Resort.

Fireworks take place on Christmas Eve and New Year's Eve.

There is a free cinema in The Kangwon Land Hotel (the same building as World Fusion Restaurant and the casino).

== Sponsorship ==
=== Sports ===
- Gangwon FC – Football Club based in Gangwon Province
- High1 – Ice Hockey Team
- Kangwon Land Cup – Go competition

=== Arts and Culture ===
- Seoul Music Awards

== See also ==
- Fountain
- Musical fountain
- Chiang Mai Night Safari
- AIDA Cruises
- Romon U-Park
