= Multimedia Fountain Roshen =

- Interactive map of the Multimedia Fountain Roshen area

General information
- Type: Multimedia Fountain
- Architectural style: Contemporary
- Location: Southern Buh, Vinnytsia, Ukraine
- Construction started: September 4, 2011
- Cost: ₴37 million
- Owner: Roshen

Design and construction
- Architect: Ralph Douw
- Main contractor: Emotion Media Factory
- Awards and prizes: "The Best Building and Construction" of the year 2012

Website
- http://www.fountainroshen.com

Multimedia Fountain Roshen (Vinnytsia Fountain "Roshen") was built on the river Southern Buh in Vinnytsia City near Festivalny Isle (Kempa Isle). This is the only multimedia fountain in Ukraine and the largest floating fountain in Europe. Fountain runs from early April to late October.

The project design and development was performed by Emotion Media Factory, a Germany-based company responsible for the dancing fountains in Chiang Mai Night Safari Park (Thailand) and Kangwon Land (South Korea) as well as the multimedia shows for AIDA Cruises. The show was created by Ralph Douw, the CEO of the company. The total cost of the project was ₴37 million (~ €1.5 million).

The fountain was officially inaugurated on 4 September 2011 along with the official opening ceremony of Roshen Quay. The Multimedia fountain Roshen is ranked No.1 on TripAdvisor among 46 attractions in Vinnytsia.

== Description ==
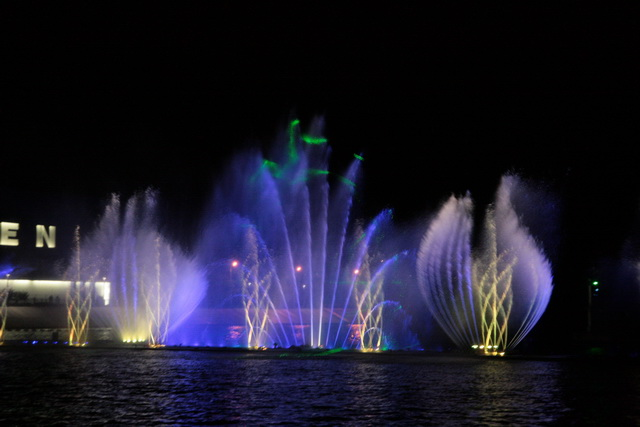
Multimedia Fountain Roshen is the only one in Ukraine and the largest floating fountain in Europe, built on the river Southern Buh in Vinnytsia City near Festivalny Isle (Campa Isle)

Multimedia fountain Roshen is located in Vinnytsia, a city in west-central Ukraine, located on the banks of the Southern Buh. Built in 2011 it is considered as one of the largest floating fountains in Europe. It is the major multimedia attraction in the city.

The fountain constitutes a part of the complex reconstruction project of the Southern Buh quay near Roshen Confectionery Factory in Vinnytsia. In the framework of the project the 700 meter water front was embanked, a pedestrian zone and a leisure area were constructed, a street lighting system was installed, and an amphitheatre was built for hosting spectators of the fountain shows. To install the fountain equipment the riverbed of the Southern Buh was cleared in the volume of 28000 cubic meters. In the history of Ukraine this project is the first of such a scale implemented on the private company costs.

Primarily the fountain systems are installed in the artificial water basins with water cleaning system. The unique characteristic of the Roshen multimedia fountain is the use of the running river water. One more exceptional characteristic of the multimedia fountain is its "hibernating technology", due to which the fountain equipment is sinking under the ice on the bottom of the Southern Buh during winter periods.

== Awards ==
Roshen Fountain and Roshen Quay are recognized the winners of the all Ukrainian competition "The Best Building and Construction" of the year 2012.

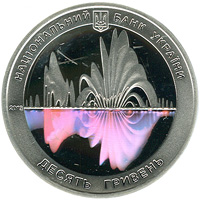
Commemorative coin with Multimedia Fountain Roshen

== Multimedia Shows ==
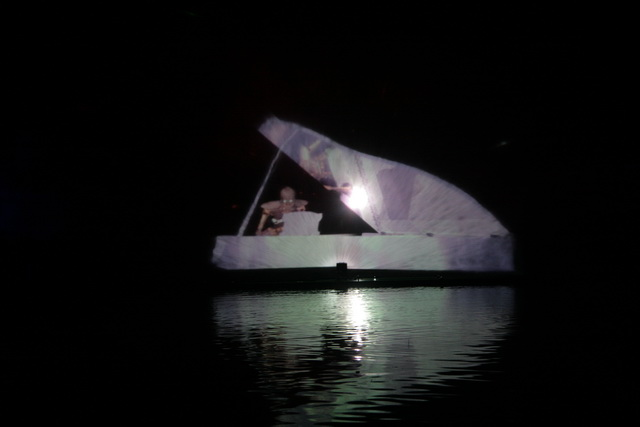
Multimedia show of Multimedia Fountain Roshen

The multimedia shows are combining water effects (fountain), music, lasers and 3D projection on the water screen. For the fountain shows the super powerful LED lights are used allowing applying very bright and showy backlighting resulting in various picturesque effects. Despite other fountains in Ukraine, Roshen multimedia fountain has moving particles reaching verticity due to which the water spring angle is changing dynamically. The sound power of the audio system is 3840 Watt. The height of the central spring reaches 65–70 metres, the projection screen dimension is around 16 metres height and 45 metres width, and the frontal water dispersion constitutes 140 metres.

Performance repertoire includes:

- W.A. Mozart, No. 40 Symphony (Day/night show with synchronised music)
- M. Glinka, Ruslan and Lyudmila (Day show with a synchronised music)
- P. Tchaikovsky, The Nutcracker (Day show with synchronised music)
- A. Vivaldi, The Four Seasons: Summer (Day show with synchronised music)
- G. Holst, The Planets (Day/night show with synchronised music)
- Enya (Day/night show with synchronised music)
- The Gate (Day/night show with synchronised music)
- Elves Show (Night show with synchronised music, projector and lasers)
- Inventions Show (Night show with synchronised music, projector and lasers)
- Swan Lake Fantasy Show (Night show with synchronised music, projector and lasers)
- The Soulmate Waves Show (Night show with synchronised music, projector and lasers)
- The Little Prince by Antoine de Saint-Exupéry (Night show with synchronised music, projector and lasers) (2016)

== Inventions Show ==
The Inventions Show is the story of the great world inventions. The idea for the Inventions show was inspired by the major milestones of human inventions. Mechanical, Electrical, Analogue and then finally Digital. The scenes shifted from a huge steam engine created by the large water effects and sound, morphing slowly into a "train" using the full 100 meters of fountain effects, through the mechanical era with cars and bikes floating across the massive water screen. Reaching the Electric era sparks and lasers fill the sky above the audience. In the pre Computer era a huge oscilloscope displays analogue morphing patterns on a 70m wide water jet screen. Grids of Laser beams fill the entire sky as we travel into the Digital era with Hologram like projections onto the entire fountains, ending in a mighty final fountain display. The music was individually composed and produced for each scene by Alexius Tschallener (Composers4Film).

== Swan Lake Fantasy Show ==
The theme is a total re-interpretation of Tchaikovsky’s Swan Lake. Swan Lake Fantasy show involves 277 jets, 67 pumps, 560 LED underwater floodlights, 4 engines, 23 frequency inverters and 240 solenoid valves. The video projection onto the water screen requires two 15,000 Ansi Lumen and in parallel there is a dazzling total of four laser lights on, through and above the water. Two 15-Watt RGB lasers and two 18-Watt RGBY lasers. Plus a very complex computerised control of the water jets together with light, laser and music.

== Little Prince Show ==
This is a new show, that was presented for the season 2016. The show is based on the novel The Little Prince (Le Petit Prince) written by Antoine de Saint-Exupéry. The show tells the story of the Little Prince, his meeting with the fox, and baobab trees ready to destroy the Prince's home asteroid.

The show combines animation, choreography and background voice telling the story.

== Season 2011 ==
On 4 September 2011 the grand opening of the Multimedia Fountain Roshen, a unique light and music fountain, took place on the quay of the Southern Buh in Vinnytsia in the presence of tens of thousands of people.

== Season 2012 ==
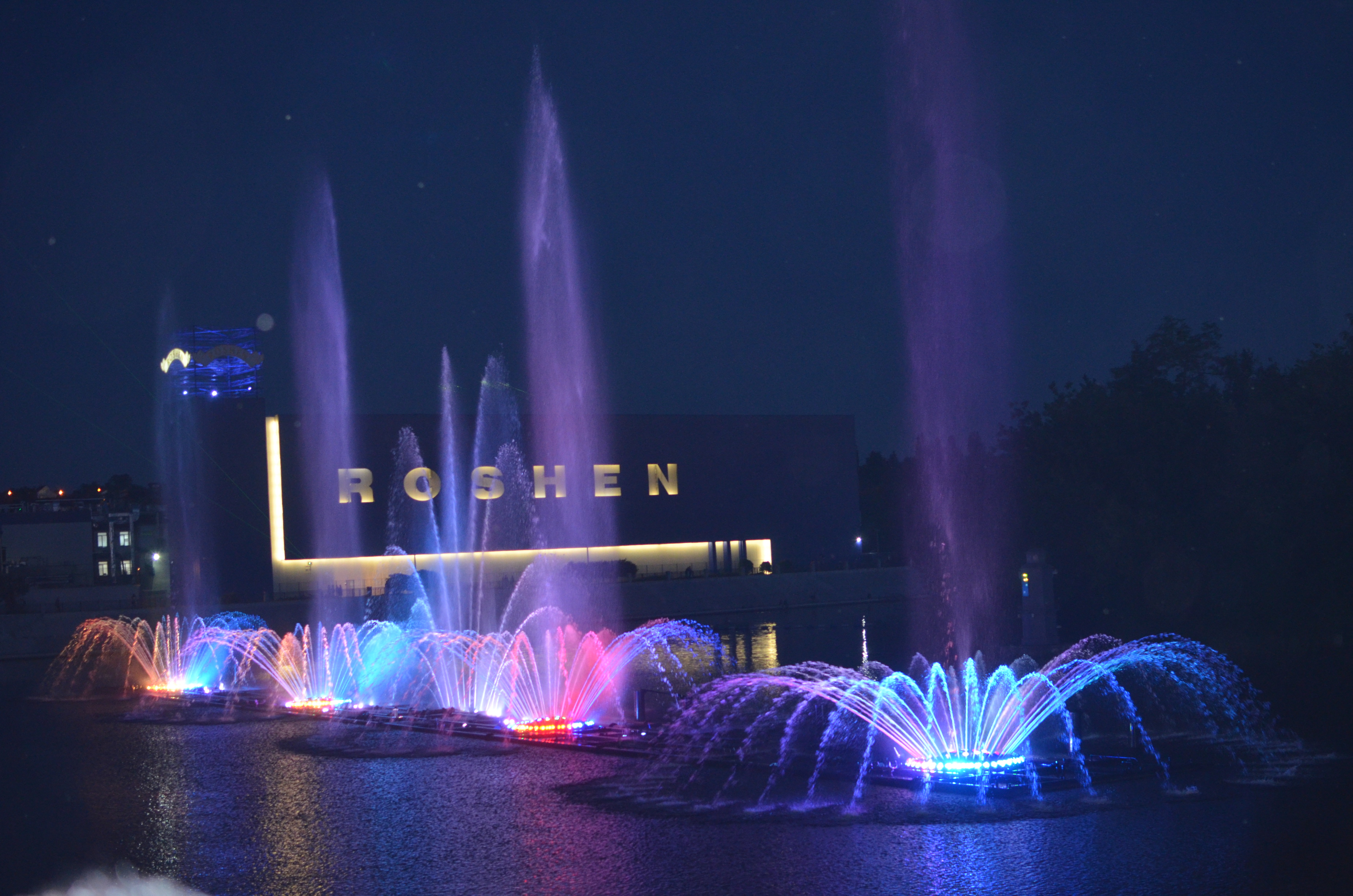
Multimedia fountain Roshen night show)

On 22 April 2012 the festive launch of the Roshen multimedia fountain in the new season was held and a new show programme was presented. By the opening period three additional laser systems were installed, allowing to apply more special effects and to vary the show programme tremendously.

== Season 2013 ==
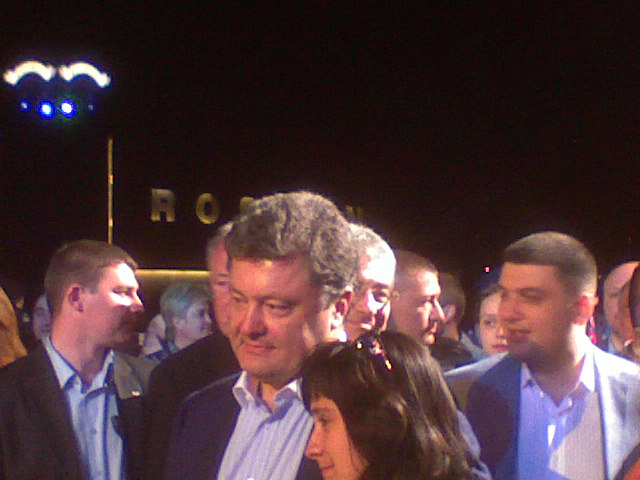
Spectators of Multimedia Fountain Roshen are taking pictures with Petro Poroshenko at grand opening of the season 2013

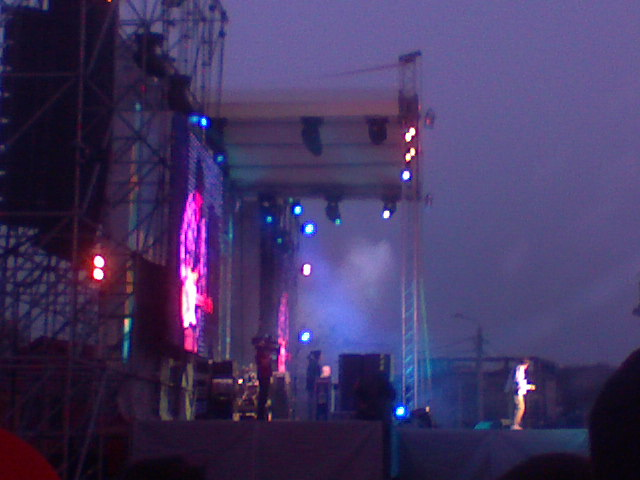
The opening of the third season of Multimedia Fountain Roshen

New season of the multimedia fountain Roshen has started at 27 April. The season grand opening was accompanied by the big music show. Famous Ukrainian artists like BoomBox band, rock band Plach Yeremiyi and Maria Burmaka.

== Season 2014 ==
In 25 April 2014 the seasonal opening of the largest light and music fountain took place in Vinnitsya. The launch day was expected on 26 April, but the owner of the Roshen confectionery Petro Poroshenko has changed the day to 25-th.

== Season 2015 ==
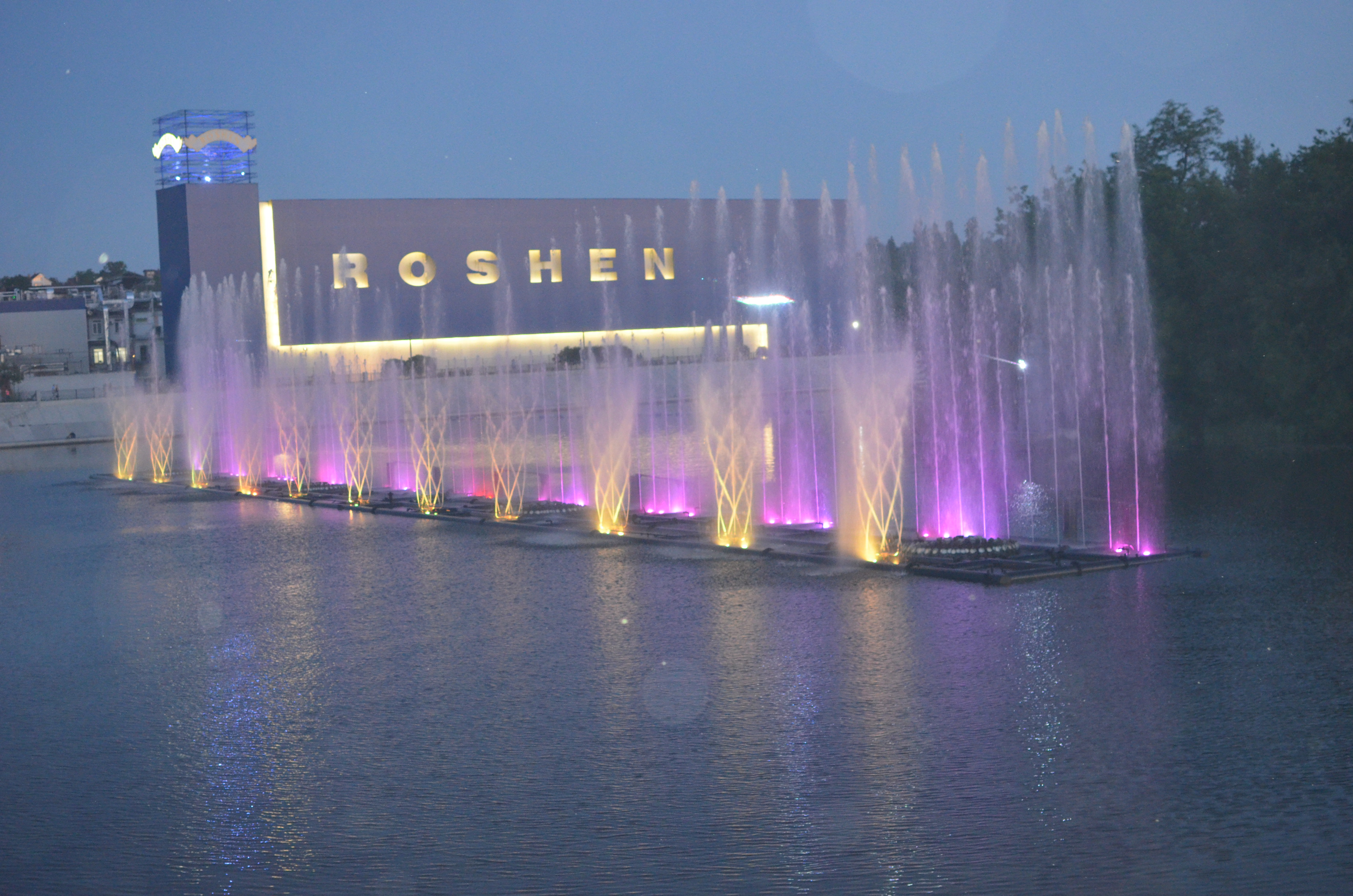
Multimedia Fountain Roshen sunset view (2015)

The new season has started at April 25. The closing ceremony was at night of 23 October. Over 20,000 spectators attended the night show. During the event people enjoyed multimedia show and the big concert of Ukrainian artists. Between the guests of the show was the family of Ukrainian president.

== Season 2016 ==
The grand opening of the new season 2016 took place on April 23 at 7 p.m. Nationwide finalists of Eurovision contest including Tonia Matvienko, Pur:Pur, Alloise, Brunettes Shot Blondies entertained visitors at the grand opening night show.

The season closing show took place on 15 October 2016. The headliners of the show were the top Ukrainian artists: 'Oleksandr Ponomariov', Braty Hadiukiny and TNMK.

== Season 2017 ==
The 7th season grand opening for the Multimedia Fountain Roshen took place on 29 April 2017 in Vinnytsia. The headliners of the concert were Ukrainian famous artists: ONUKA and Arsen Mirzoyan.

== Technical Characteristics ==
• Length - 97 meters
• Width - 10 meters
• Height of the central jet - 63 meters
• Dispersion of water on the front - 140 meters
• Size of water projection screen - 16 × 45 meters
• Water pumps power - 780 kW
• Number of underwater lights - 560 pcs.
• Sound power audio system - 3840 watts

Floating platform - general dimensions:
• Length - 93.8 meters
• Width - 7.5 meters
• Draft - 1.36 meters
• Displacement - ~ 170 tons

== Virtual Tour ==
http://fontan-roshen.map.vn.ua/

== Web-cameras ==
http://vcf.vn.ua:8080/view/viewer_index.shtml?id=3807%5B%5D

https://web.archive.org/web/20130818062520/http://vcf.vn.ua:8081/view/viewer_index.shtml?id=32044

== See also ==
- Fountain
- Musical fountain
- Chiang Mai Night Safari
- Kangwon Land
- AIDA Cruises
- Romon U-Park
