= Terraced Garden, Chandigarh =

Public garden in Chandigarh, India

Coordinates: 30°42′52″N 76°46′18″E

The Terraced Garden is a public garden in the city of Chandigarh, India. Established in 1979, it spans an area of approximately 10 acres (4.0 hectares) and is known for its distinctive terraced layout. The garden was developed with the aim of providing a green space for the residents of Chandigarh.

The garden is adorned with a variety of flowering plants, and the terraces are embellished with flower beds that bloom in different seasons. It includes a musical fountain, which is lit up during the evening. There are walking paths throughout the garden. It is located in Sector 33 of Chandigarh and is accessible by public and private transportation. It is the main venue for the annual Chrysanthemum show. It is open to the public daily from 05:00 AM to 09:00 PM.

The Terraced Garden hosts an annual Chrysanthemum Show, a flower show that features a variety of chrysanthemums.
