= Mine caps =

Barriers sealing old mines for safety

Mine caps are typically used to prevent access to old, abandoned mines. People, especially the young, like to explore their surroundings but may not fully understand the dangers inherent within, and surrounding, a mine.

== Reasons for mine capping ==
Cave-ins, poor air quality, wet slippery surfaces, etc. are real dangers when entering a mine, but even the surrounding area can be dangerous. Older mines may have been covered with logs or wooden beams with loose rock and soil over the top. These fail over time, creating sinkholes, that may not be visible on the surface, until enough weight collapses it.

== Law requirements ==
National and regional/local laws often dictate certain aspects in the capping process, such as allowances for bats to have access. The type of mine, water table, geology, etc. are all considered when choosing which type of cap will be used for a given mine entrance.

== Types ==
=== Concrete caps ===
Concrete continues to be the preferred method for capping vertical shafts. Considerations can be made in the design to allow for an entrance to the mine, a steel door for humans, a slot for bats, a hole for airflow. The slab thickness can vary from as little as 15 cm (5.9 in) to a few meters (several feet).

=== Expanding foam ===
Expanding foam is quickly replacing concrete for some vertical shafts, typically mines where an entrance for humans is no longer desired. This type of cap is sometimes referred to as a "Plug." Plugs usually have a taper to them, smaller on the bottom and wider on the top, like the cork on a wine bottle. Expanding foam plugs need to be quite thick, usually no less than 2 m (6.6 ft) deep. Typically, loose rock and soil is placed over the top.

=== Grates ===
A steel grate may be used to cover the mine adit or shaft. This has the advantage of allowing mine gas to ventilate, water to drain from horizontal adits, and bats to traverse the grate.

=== Steel plates ===
Petherick Mine Cap (Horizontal Shaft), July, 2009

6 millimetre (¼ inch) or thicker steel-plating is also used, on both horizontal and vertical shafts. These allow for easier customization than concrete, cutting access holes in steel is far easier than building the concrete forms necessary for the same result. This type of cap is used where easy access is a necessity.

The photo at right is of a ¼-inch steel-plating cap at the entrance to a horizontal shaft at the Petherick Mine, located in Keweenaw County, Michigan. The slot cut near the top of the plate allows bats to enter and exit.
