= Kangwon Land Cup =

The Kangwon-Land Cup is a Go competition.

== Outline ==
The countries that compete are China and Korea. The competition is in knockout style. Both countries select 6 players to play for them in this competition. They then choose in which order they wish for the players to play. First, the competition is started when two players play. Whoever wins goes on and plays the next player. If they win they go on again and play the next person. However, if they lose, they are out of the tournament completely. The tournament is sponsored by Kangwon Land. The winner's purse is 150 million South Korean Won ($154,000). If a player wins three games in a row, they are awarded an extra 10 million Won ($10,000).

== Past winners ==
Country

Team	Years Won
China	2006

Player with most consecutive wins.

Player	Wins
(China) Chang Hao	4

== 1st Kangwon-Land Cup ==
Game	Date	Black	White	Result
1	Feb 6	Piao Wenyao 4p	Lee Sedol 9p	W+R
2	Feb 7	Lee Sedol 9p	Chen Yaoye 5p	W+R
3	Feb 8	Hong Seongji 4p	Chen Yaoye 5p	W+2.5
4	Feb 9	Chen Yaoye 5p	An Joyeong 9p	W+R
5	Feb 10	Wang Xi 5p	An Joyeong 9p	W+0.5
6	Mar 20	An Joyeong 9p	Luo Xihe 9p	B+0.5
7	Mar 21	Chang Hao 9p	An Joyeong 9p	B+R
8	Mar 22	Kim Dongyeop 9p	Chang Hao 9p	W+R
9	Mar 23	Chang Hao 9p	Cho Hunhyun 9p	B+5.5
10	Mar 24	Lee Chang-ho 9p	Chang Hao 9p	W+3.5
