= Blue Hawk Mine =

Gold mine in British Columbia, Canada

- Entrance to Blue Hawk Mine

- Location within British Columbia

Location
- Location: Kelowna, British Columbia, Canada; 49°59′2″N 119°30′59″W

Production
- Products: Gold

History
- Opened: 1934
- Closed: 1934

Blue Hawk Mine is a gold mine located on the east slope of Blue Grouse Mountain, on the west side of Okanagan Lake. The mine is just a few kilometres from Downtown Kelowna in the Canadian province of British Columbia.

The mine consists of several adits operated for a single year, 1934, and has been virtually abandoned ever since. British Columbia's Ministry of Energy, Mines and Petroleum Resources refers to the mine as "082ENW002", and states that 5 metric tonnes of ore was mined yielding 560 grams (18 oz t) of silver and 156 grams (5 oz t) of gold. The total horizontal length of the mine is approximately 90 metres.

The mine is known to many Kelowna locals, and a gravel road leading past the mine is regularly maintained. The entrance to the mine often contains pooled water, but the interior is relatively dry and contains many undisturbed geological formations (first, second).

The location of the mine according to British Columbia's Ministry of Energy, Mines and Petroleum Resources is 49°59′2″N 119°31′6″W. Several Kelowna locals have reported the entrance to the mine to be at the alternate coordinates of 49°59′2″N 119°30′59″W, at an elevation of 965 meters.

== History ==
- 1930s: Blue Hawk Mine, surface trenching and pits
- 1965 through 1980: Dawood Mines Ltd explores the property with surface trenching, linecutting, grid preparation, soil sampling, and magnetometer survey. F. Marshall Smith's Assessment Report also mentions "minor scaling of the main adit walls and roof", though the exact year this was undertaken is not recorded.
- 1980 through 1986: Neall Curtis Lenard completes limited prospecting, mapping and sampling programs
- 1986 through ?: Pinewood Resources performs additional drilling, trenching, soil sampling for gold, and completes "a 5 hole drill program in the area of the existing adit"

More recent history of the property and rights is unclear, though the most recent owner of the property seems to be Armac Investments Ltd. of Vancouver, BC. The claims to an area covering 3 km^{2} -- including the Blue Hawk Mine—may have been sold by Armac to Southern Pacific Development Corp. of Vancouver, BC, in 2004 or 2005.

== Adit map ==
Page 13 of F. Marchall Smith's Assessment Report (dated December 18, 1994) contains a detailed map of the area around the mine, including the adit. Recent exploration of the mine has shown that the ceiling has collapsed and is now impassable in the adit beneath "Trench 5". An annotated copy of the map is available with the approximate location of the collapse indicated in red.
