= Adit =

Horizontal entrance shaft to an underground mine

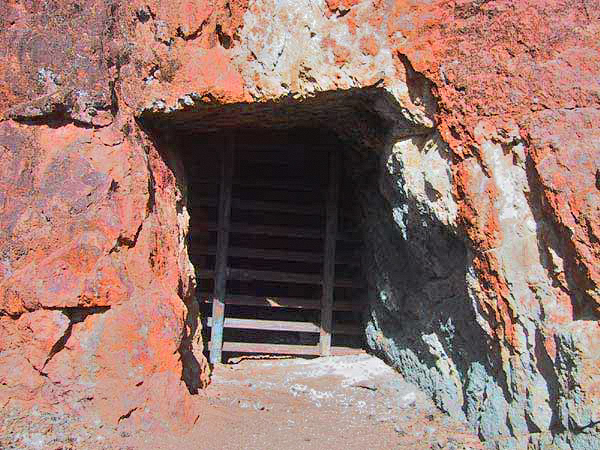
Gated entrance of an abandoned adit near Medford, Oregon, United States

An adit (from Latin aditus, entrance) or stulm is a horizontal or nearly horizontal passage to an underground mine. Miners can use adits for access, drainage, ventilation, and extracting minerals at the lowest convenient level. Adits are also used to explore for mineral veins. Although most strongly associated with mining, the term adit is sometimes also used in the context of underground excavation for non-mining purposes; for example, to refer to smaller underground passageways excavated for underground metro systems, to provide pedestrian access to stations (pedestrian adits), and for access required during construction (construction adits).

== Construction ==
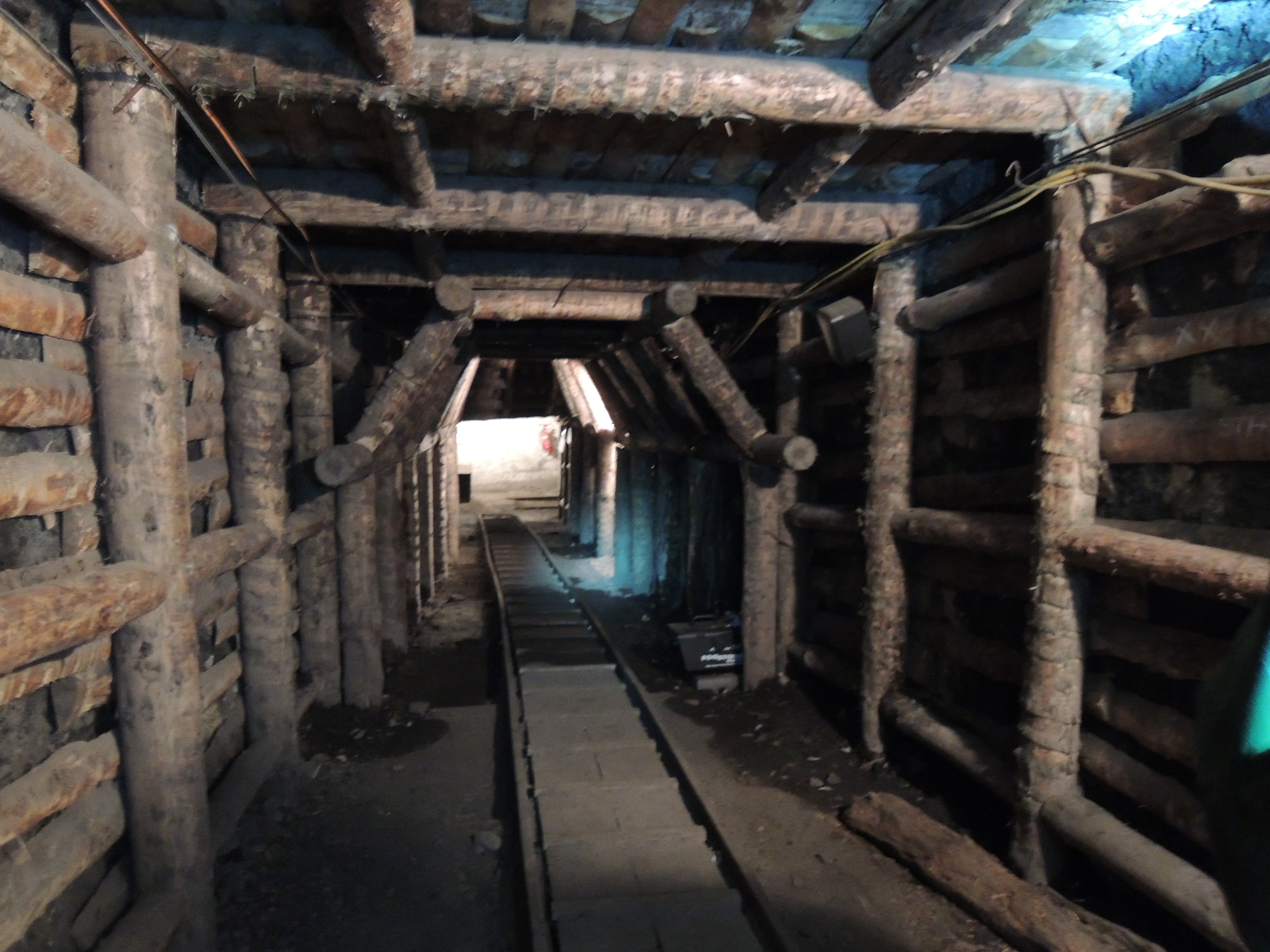
Queen Louise adit, Zabrze, Poland

Adits are driven into the side of a hill or mountain, and are often used when an ore body is located inside the mountain but above the adjacent valley floor or coastal plain. In cases where the mineral vein outcrops at the surface, the adit may follow the lode or vein until it is worked out, in which case the adit is rarely straight. The use of adits for the extraction of ore is generally called drift mining.

Adits can only be driven into a mine where the local topography permits. There will be no opportunity to drive an adit to a mine situated on a large flat plain, for instance. Also if the ground is weak, the cost of shoring up a long adit may outweigh its possible advantages.

== Access and ventilation ==
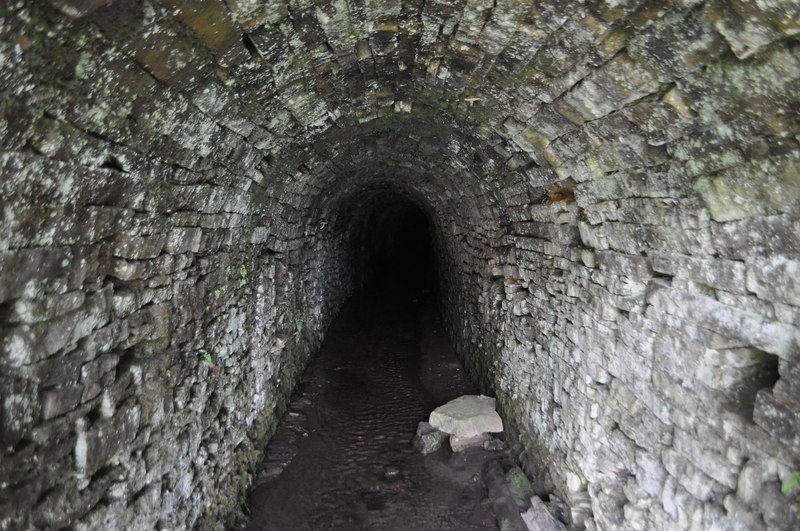
Horse adit in the abandoned lead mine, Nenthead, County Durham, UK

Access to a mine by adit has many advantages over the vertical access shafts used in shaft mining. Less energy is required to transport miners and heavy equipment into and out of the mine. It is also much easier to bring ore or coal out of the mine. Horizontal travel by means of narrow-gauge tramway or cable car is also much safer and can move more people and ore than vertical elevators. In the past horses and pit ponies were used.

In combination with shafts, adits form an important element in the ventilation of a mine: in simple terms, cool air will enter through an adit, be warmed by the higher temperature underground and will naturally exhaust from vertical shafts, some of which are sunk specifically for this purpose.

== Drainage ==
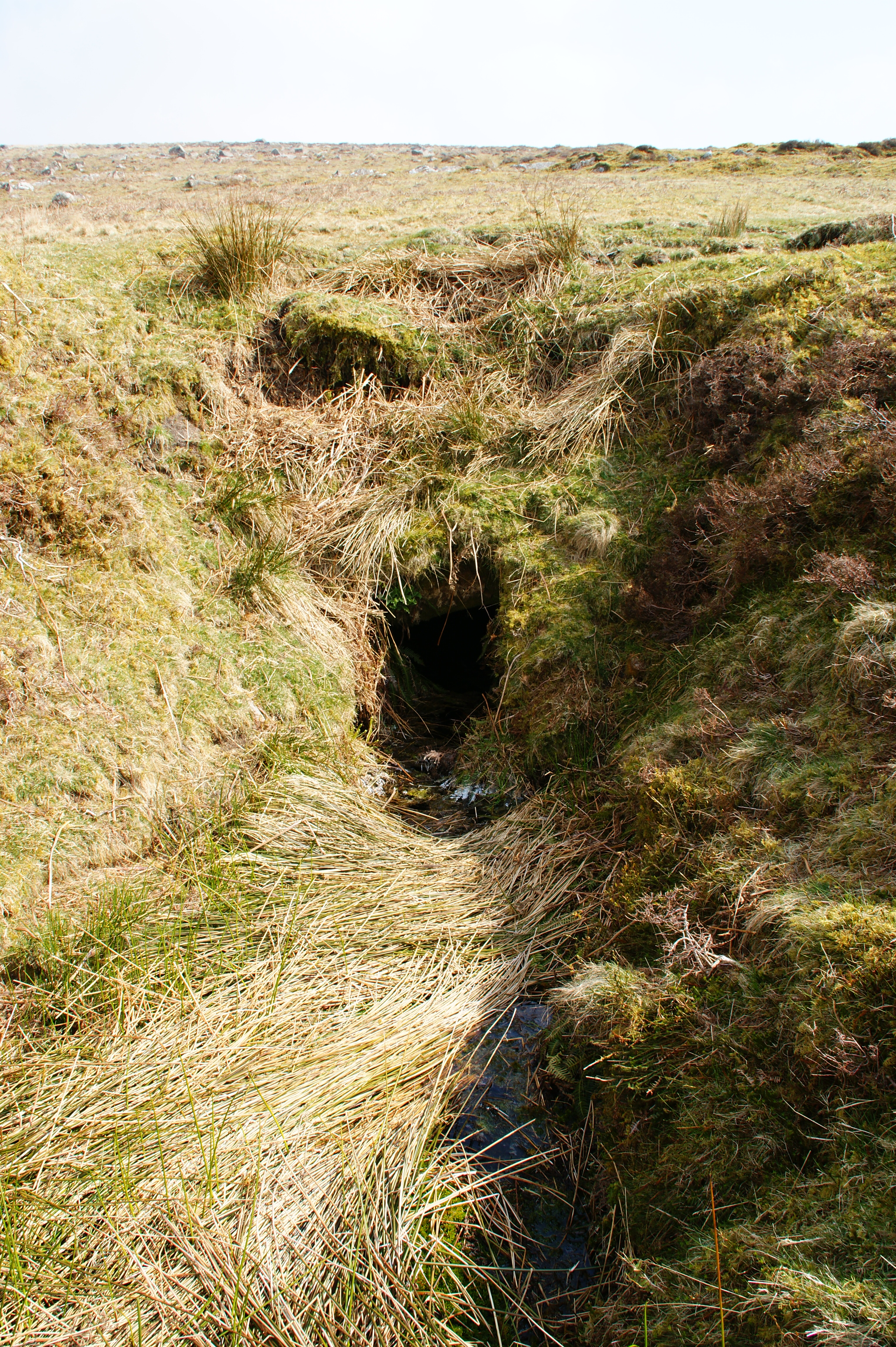
Two Brothers Adit, a small surviving mine entrance at the site of Eylesbarrow mine, Dartmoor, Devon

Most adits are designed to slope slightly upwards from the entrance so that water will flow freely out of the mine. Mines that have adits can be at least partly drained of water by gravity alone or power-assisted gravity. The depth to which a mine can be drained by gravity alone is defined by the deepest open adit which is known as the "drainage adit". The term mine drainage tunnel is also common, at least in the United States. Workings above this level (known as "above adit") will remain unflooded as long as the adit does not become blocked. All mine workings below both the drainage adit ("below adit") and the water table will flood unless mechanical means are used for drainage. Until the invention of the steam engine this was the main restriction on deep mining. Adits are useful for deeper mines. Water only needs to be raised to the drainage adit rather than to the surface.

Because of the great reduction in ongoing costs that a drainage adit can provide, they have sometimes been driven for great distances for this purpose. One example is the Milwr tunnel in North Wales, which is about ten miles (16 km) long. Other examples are the Great County Adit in Cornwall, a 40-mile-long (64 km) network of adits that used to drain the whole Gwennap mining area, and the 3.9 miles (6.3 km) Sutro Tunnel at the Comstock Lode in Virginia City, Nevada. A side benefit of driving such extensive adits is that previously unknown ore-bodies can be discovered, helping finance the enormous cost.

Adits were used in Cornwall before 1500, and were important to the tin and copper mines in Cornwall and Devon because the ore-bearing veins are nearly vertical, thus acting as ingress channels for water.

== Notable examples ==
- Great County Adit, a system of over 40 miles (65 km) of adits used for dewatering more than 100 mines in the Gwennap area of Cornwall in the 18th and early 19th centuries.
- The Hollingwood Common Canal is a disused navigable coal mine adit which terminated at the Chesterfield Canal at Hollingwood, near Staveley, Derbyshire.
- Milwr tunnel, a 10-mile-long (16 km) drainage adit in North Wales. Started in 1897, it still discharges an average of 87 million litres (23 million US gallons) of water per day from the disused Halkyn District United Mines.
- The Snowy Mountains hydroelectric and irrigation scheme in the Australian Snowy Mountains, created during its construction. The adits are very large and used to access the central point from which the hydro tunnels were constructed.
- Black Trout Adit in Tarnowskie Góry, Poland. Part of a former silver mine, the adit was used for removing water from the mine. It still carries water from old galleries to the nearest river. A part of it is open for tourists, who go 20 metres (66 ft) down the steps in one shaft, have a ride in a boat, and go up the stairs in another shaft.
- Blue Hawk Mine near Kelowna, British Columbia, Canada.
- NORCAT's Underground Centre (Fecunis Adit), in Onaping, Ontario, Canada, used for underground training and mining technology development.
- Sutro Tunnel for drainage and exploitation of the Comstock Lode in Nevada.
- Tiefer Stollen in Schauinsland near Freiburg.

== Similar terms ==
- A "drift" is a more general term for any near-horizontal underground passage in a mine. Unlike an adit, a drift need not break out to the surface. Drift mining is the use of drifts to extract ore - in this case the drifts follow the vein.
- A "level" is a horizontal passage that branches off from a shaft and is used for access to the parts of the mine where the ore is being removed. In mines where the lodes have significant vertical extent there can be many numbered levels, one below the other. They can be connected by short vertical shafts known as "winzes". A level that reaches the surface, on a hillside or in a valley, for instance, is called an "adit level". In the Worsley Navigable Levels in Greater Manchester, England, the levels were intentionally flooded and coal was transported on canal boats.
- "Sough" is a term mainly used in the lead mining areas of Derbyshire. The main purpose of a sough is to drain water from the mine.

== See also ==
- Glossary of coal mining terminology
- Mine caps

== Sources ==
- Earl, Bryan (1994). Cornish Mining: The Techniques of Metal Mining in the West of England, Past and Present (2nd ed.). St Austell: Cornish Hillside Publications. ISBN 0-9519419-3-3.
