= Deep Tunnel (Hercherhof) =

Passage to a mine near Freiburg, Germany

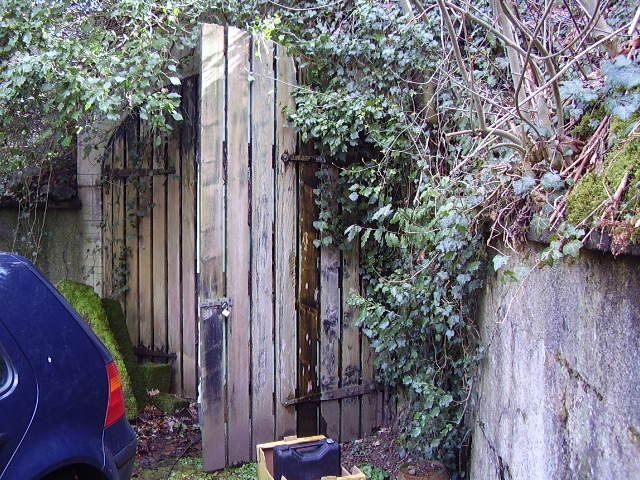
This part of the Schauinsland mining complex is not available to the public

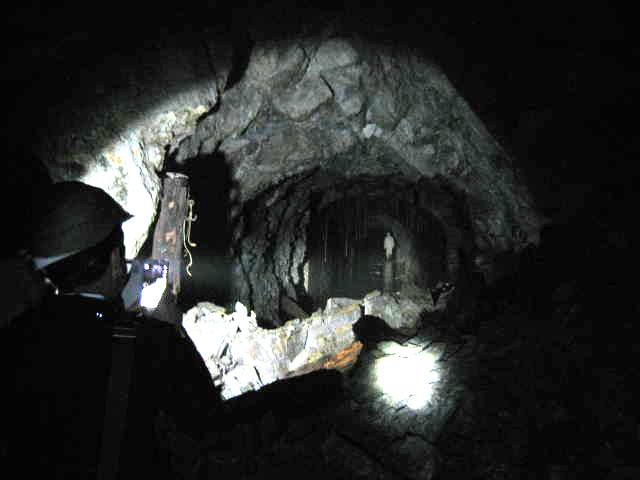
Checking the back area partially buried

The Deep Tunnel (German: Tiefer Stollen) is an adit at Hercherhof near Freiburg, Germany. It is a part of the Schauinsland mine complex and was built for the Stolberg Zink AG to provide easier access to the seventh floor level of the Roggenbergschacht mine. Construction began in 1938. Its construction was part of the Four Year Plan, an economic plan designed to prepare Nazi Germany for war, and Hermann Göring's name was invoked in a dispute between the mining company and the state environmental protection agency when the agency requested the greening of excavated material.

The plan was to replace the existing goods cable lift near the railway to secure the transport via Freiburg, and then to the Stolberg Zink AG in Pforzheim for further processing. The driving started in 1938 after the mining rights were acquired in 1935. This new approach was due to the development of the new flotation process. Thus, the ancient disposal heaps of former ore washings were processed. The tunnel's size of 2.5 m by 2.5 m accommodated the horses that had been used as carriers. In 1944 this tunnel achieved a length of more than 3.4 km, exploited by prisoners of war. The final connection to the Leopold gallery must have been accomplished in 1946. This level was in use until 1954. However, in the 1960s the tunnel collapsed 720 meters away from the Kappel valley entrance.

This underground construction is part of a larger medieval silver mine in the Schauinsland mountain near Freiburg in Breisgau, a relic of the last war effort to extract zinc and lead ore from this area. Today the large mining complex is a repository for historical documents, an adventure mine to attract tourists, students and amateur geologists as well as further underground research. The planned extension to the northern ore dressing part was not completed i.e. 300 m remains unaccomplished. Therefore, the Deep Tunnel could never fulfill its function as a transport route for ore. So it only served for the transport of Kappel's miners and the mine's water drainage.

== See also ==
- Berthold Steiber: Der Schauinsland. Geschichte, Geologie, Mineralien. Doris Bode Verlag, Haltern. 1986.
