= Romon U-Park =

Amusement park in Ningbo, China

- Interactive map of Romon U-Park
- Location: Hilton Garden Inn, 820 XiaoGao East Road / 1099 Yinzhou Avenue, Ningbo, China
- Coordinates: 29.799412°N 121.544202°E
- Status: Operating
- Opened: June 19, 2015
- Owner: Romon Group
- Operated by: Romon Group
- Operating season: Year-round
- Website: Official website

Romon U-park (Chinese: 罗蒙环球乐园) is a 200,000 m^{2} amusement park located in the south of Ningbo, China. By its size it can be considered one of the largest urban indoor theme parks in the world. It is funded by the leading Chinese clothing manufacturer Romon Group.
It is built based on Lotte World in Seoul, South Korea. Romon U-park consists of a 57.4m high indoor park and an outdoor park "Legend Island". There are six differently themed zones in the park: Romantic Avenue, Fantasy Dream, Mystery Land, Adventure Challenge, Festival Plaza and The Island of Legends. In all there are over 30 attractions, 30 specialty restaurants and 20 specialty shops.

== Etymology ==
Romon is a Chinese clothing manufacturer and the "U" in "Romon U-Park" is for "Universal". The total cost of the project was over 3 billion RMB.

== Attraction areas ==
- Romantic Avenue
- Fanatasy Dreams
- Mystery Land
- Adventure Challenge
- Island of Legends
- Festival Plaza

The park has a two station monorail that runs above both the indoor and outdoor attractions travelling across the entire venue. The track has switches so the route can be limited to the indoor area in case of inclement weather.

== Surrounding facilities ==
- Romon Universal Paradise Hotel
- Hilton Garden Inn Ningbo Romon

This hotel is the brand's first project in Ningbo and functions as a hotel for the Romon Fairyland theme park. Special attention was given to make both family and business travelers feel at home. The dramatic spiral staircase on the ground floor creates the graceful spine of the camphor tree inspired main entrance.

- Shopping center—Romon Mall

== Multimedia shows ==
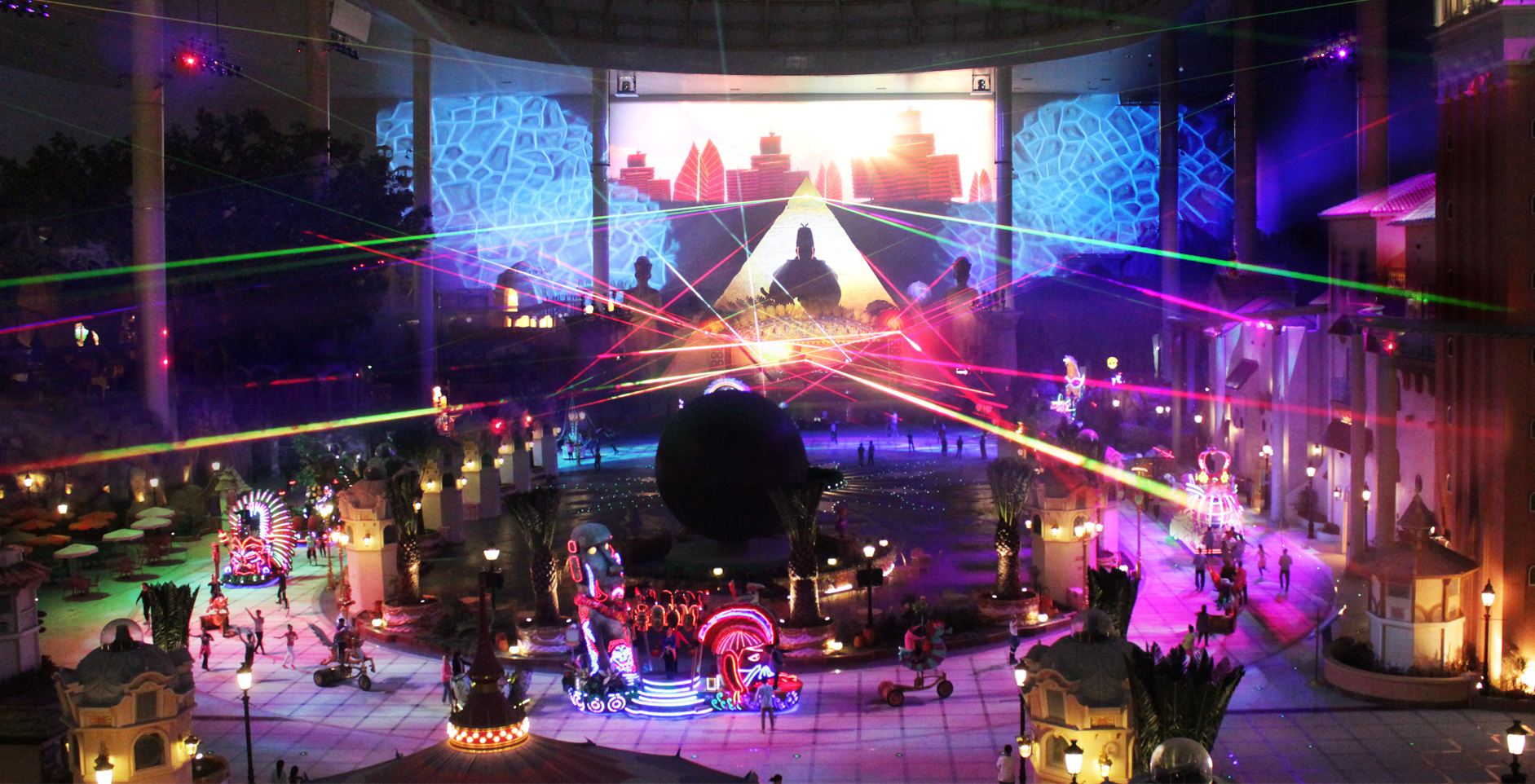
"Zheng He is coming" multimedia show in Romon U-Park, Ningbo, China

A major attraction of the park are its multimedia shows, including "The Source of Light" about the adventures of two panda bears "Romon" and "Romie", as well as "Zheng He is coming" about Zheng He, a Chinese admiral and diplomat of the 15th century.

Both shows include video projection mapping, laser beams and laser graphic effects, digital water screen, fire bursts, lights, fog, music and sound effects. Shows are technically based on 10 Barco video projectors projecting onto the 30x30 meter pyramid, the 20 meter wide pyramid stage screen and the back wall. Two video servers, 12 full colour laser projectors, 48 moving lights, 20 flame bursts, and the 18 meter digital water screen are all centrally controlled and synchronized.

Both multimedia shows became a core attraction of the Romon U-Park. Emotion Media Factory was responsible for all aspects of project planning, as well as system operation and maintenance. Music was created by Selcuk Torun.

== Awards ==
In October 2015 "Zheng He is coming" multimedia show by Emotion Media Factory became a finalist for the Brass Rings Award by IAAPA. The equivalent of the Oscars for the Amusement Park Industry, the award is given to multimedia attractions with a budget of $1 million or more.

== See also ==
- AIDA Cruises
- Chiang Mai Night Safari
- Fountain
- Lotte World
- Musical fountain
