= Emotion Media Factory =

Emotion Media Factory GmbH
- Type: Privately held company
- Industry: Entertainment
- Founded: 1984
- Founders: Ralph Douw, Helmut Doerner, Robert Huber
- Headquarters: Munich, Germany
- Area served: Worldwide
- Key people: Ralph Douw; Helmut Doerner; Robert Huber
- Products: Musical & Multimedia fountains; Multimedia show technologies; Special effects; 3D display "HoloPort"; Multimedia shows; Laser shows
- Website: http://www.emfactory.de/

Emotion Media Factory GmbH (EMF) is a creative multimedia attraction and show production company based near Munich in front of the Bavarian Alps in Germany. Emotion Media Factory produces multimedia fountains and attractions.

Emotion Media Factory is a member of International Association of Amusement Parks and Attractions and Themed Entertainment Association organisations.

== History ==
Emotion Media Factory was established in 1984 under the name Laserland. The original founders were Ralph Douw, Helmut Dörner, Robert Huber and Serge Douw. Among the first clients of the company were BMW, Siemens, Pepsi-Cola and Audi.

On 22 June 2022, the company began insolvency procedures and on 22 September 2023, the company was closed in commercial register.

== Awards ==
Emotion Media Factory received “The Best Building and Construction” of the year award in 2012 for their project Multimedia Fountain Roshen

In October 2015, multimedia show for Romon U-Park “Zheng He is coming” by Emotion Media Factory was a finalist of the Brass Rings Awards by IAAPA.

Emotion Media Factory was awarded with TripAdvisor’s Certificate of Excellence for Multimedia Fountain Roshen every year from 2014 to 2017.

== Multimedia shows ==
Inventions Show of Multimedia Fountain Roshen

Inventions Show, Multimedia Fountain Roshen, Vinnitsya, Ukraine
The Inventions show highlighted the progression of human inventions over time. A different style and visual look was used to represent each era shown. The music was individually composed and produced for each scene together with Alexius Tschallener (Music4Films).

Swan Lake Fantasy Show, Multimedia Fountain Roshen, Vinnitsya, Ukraine
Swan Lake Fantasy Show was a co-production between Emotion Media Factory and the Ukrainian company Watershow.Pro. The theme was a re-interpretation of Tchaikovsky’s Swan Lake. Ukrainian top ballet dancers performances were combined with multimedia effects in the new interpretation of the classical ballet.

Zheng He is coming, Romon U-Park, Ningbo, China
“Zheng He is coming”, is multimedia performance that tells the story of Zheng He, a Chinese admiral and diplomat of the 15th century. Zheng He commanded expeditionary voyages to Southeast Asia, South Asia, the Middle East, and East Africa from 1405 to 1433. The show was a finalist at the Brass Rings Awards by IAAPA.

== Multimedia fountains and installations ==
- Romon U-Park, Ningbo, China – EMF developed, created and produced two 20 minute multimedia shows The shows use ten Barco video projectors projecting onto a 30x30 meter pyramid, the 20 meter wide pyramid stage screen and the back wall, 2 High-End video servers, 12 full colour laser projectors, 48 moving lights, 20 flame bursts and an 18 meter digital water screen. All these components are centrally controlled and synchronized.

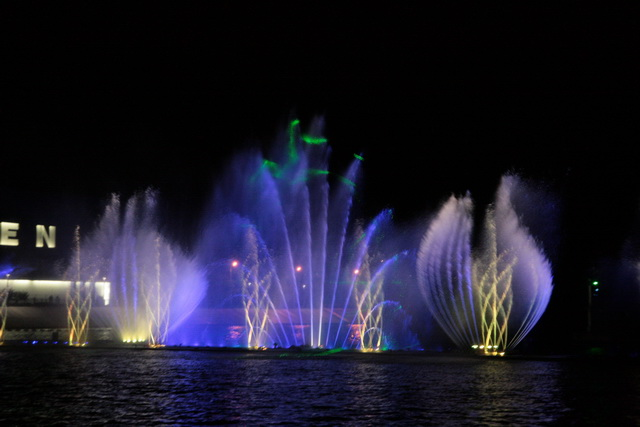
Night show of Multimedia Fountain Roshen

- Multimedia Fountain Roshen, Vinnitsya, Ukraine – completed in 2011, it is Europe's largest floating fountain system and was created by EMF in the Ukrainian city of Vinnytsia for the Roshen Confectionery Group.

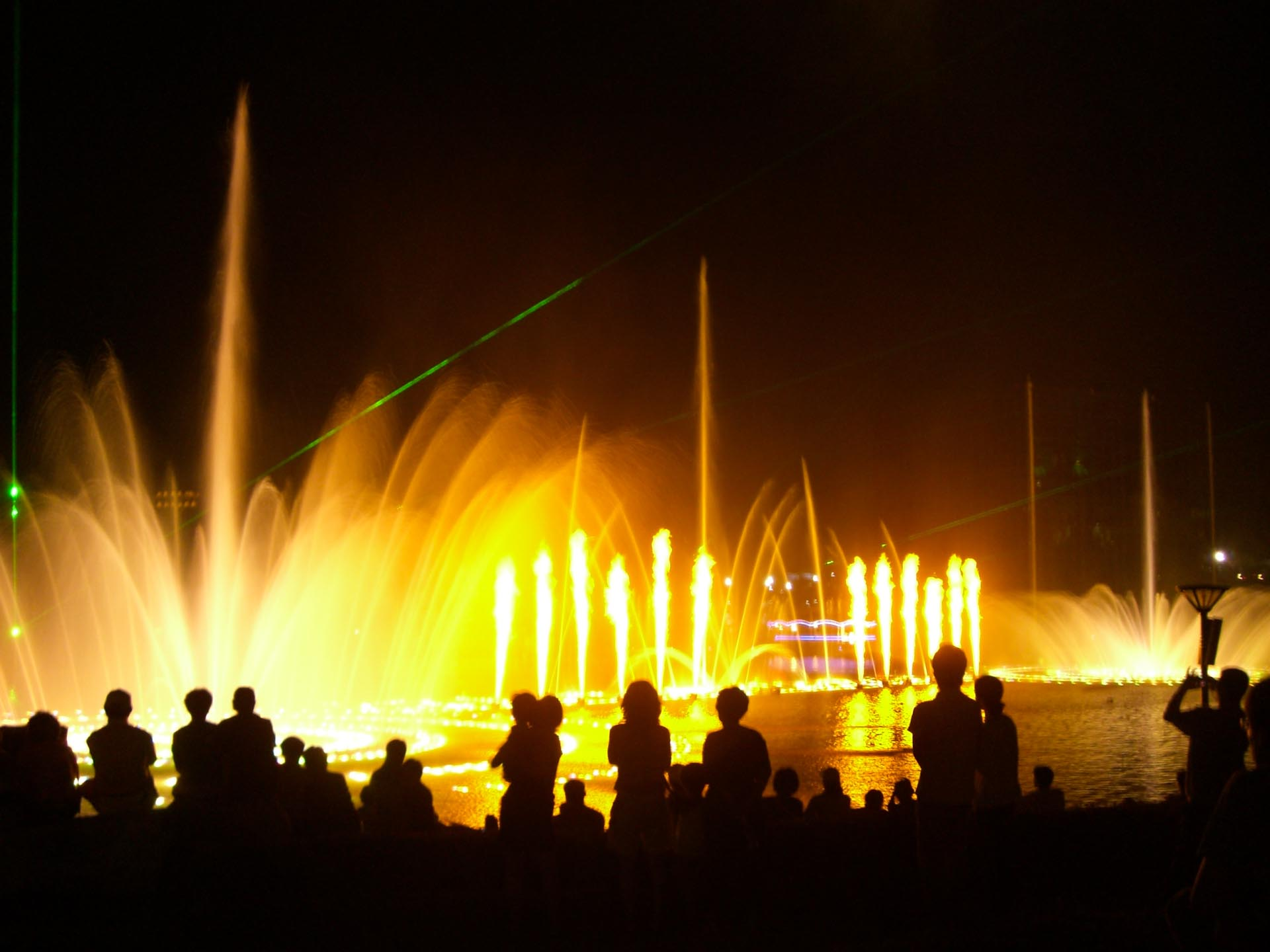
Multimedia Fountain Show Kangwon Land Resort

- High One, Gangwon, South Korea – EMF has worked with the Kangwon Land Resort (now known as High One). In 2007, there was an upgrade of the multimedia facilities, which added 2 30 metre wide circular fountains features, a 40 metre water screen, multicolor fire effects, high definition video projection, and laser beams.
- Night Safari Park, Chiang Mai, Thailand – the Night Safari Park multimedia fountain show consists of the 30 x 6 m floating multimedia fountain and water screen with laser graphics. The fountain is equipped with more than 1,200 water jets to create a variety of water effects in time to music. In addition, a water screen is built into the feature, providing a 40-metre wide and 15-metre high projection area for video, light and laser projections. The project was completed for the opening show in 2006.

== 3D HoloPort ==
The HoloPort is an attraction which allows viewers to see realistic 3D images without the use of 3D glasses. Examples of installations include:

- The Magic House, Phoenix Market City, Chennai, India – a ten-minute long 3D show titled A Journey to Paradise in iPlay India's family entertainment zone. Opened in 2013.
- Europa-Park, Rust, Germany – a 120 m^{2} (1,300 sq ft) theater installation was based in the Enchanted Forest area in the Grimm Library. Up to 40 visitors at a time could watch a short drama about the Grimms in 3D. EMF's brief was to use the HoloPort for production of a virtual 3D world with high-resolution character animation and 3D still images to project parts of the interior. One aspect of the show also allowed for a small amount of viewer integration. Some selected persons could see themselves as a giant, a king, or a witch.

== AIDA Cruises ==
Cruise ships operated by Aida Cruises have EMF-supplied laser technology, which can withstand extreme climatic conditions as well as direct contact with sea water on the open-air deck. The multimedia shows are developed, programmed and implemented on a remote basis. For all cruise liners, new shows are created about 3 – 4 times per year. In total, over 40 shows are produced by EMF each year for AIDA Cruises.
