= Chiang Mai Night Safari =

Zoo in Thailand

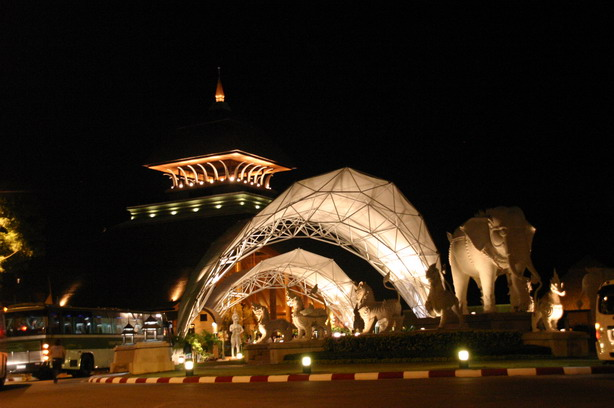
- Night Safari Main building
- Interactive map of Chiang Mai Night Safari
- 18°44′32″N 98°55′2″E
- Date opened: February 6, 2006
- Location: Chiang Mai, Thailand
- Land area: 327 acres (132 ha)
- No. of animals: 400+
- No. of species: 50+
- Major exhibits: Savanna Safari; Predator Prowl; Jaguar Trail; Multimedia Fountain
- Website: chiangmainightsafari.com/en/

Chiang Mai Night Safari (Thai: เชียงใหม่ไนท์ซาฟารี) is located in the sub-district of Mae Hia in Chiang Mai, and the district Nong Khwai, and the district Hang Dong in Thailand. It is a zoo that is located to the west of Royal Flora Ratchaphruek 2006. Chiang Mai Night Safari is a government property under the Zoological Park Organization. The park was opened for the first time on 18 November 2005 and opened officially on the 6 February 2006. Initially, it was under Designated Areas for Sustainable Tourism Administration and the Pinganakorn Development Agency (Public Organization). Chiang Mai Night Safari is believed to be the first nocturnal zoo in Thailand and is the largest in the world, covering an area of 819 Rai or approximately 327 acres. Presently Chiang Mai Night Safari has changed its opening hours allowing entry for visitors during both the day and night hours.

In some areas, relatively non-dangerous animals roam freely, thereby giving the visitors a closer look at the animals. From the entry gate up to the main building, there are free-roaming deer and muntjac; they are also seen around the north and south tour zones.

== History ==
The Chiang Mai Night Safari was envisioned by Prime Minister Thaksin Shinawatra. His aim for a nocturnal zoo was to create a high-quality tourist attraction similar to Singapore's Night Safari, which has become a global success. Once the Prime Minister had this vision, he had brought it to the attention of Kosin Katethong, the then Governor of Chiang Mai, to find an appropriate place to start the construction. There were many places proposed, such as the forest areas of the Doi Saket District. Eventually, an area at the foot of Doi Suthep which is located in the sub-district of Mae Hia, Chiang Mai was chosen.

The Prime Minister received approval No.90/2545 on 25 March 2002 and started a Chiang Mai Night Zoo Establishment Study Committee and Related Activities for Tourism Promotion. A resolution was passed through the cabinet on 28 October 2003. They received approval for the budget of the "Chiang Mai Night Safari" project in the amount of 1,155.9 million baht distributed to the Ministry of Natural Resources and Environment by the Department of National Parks, Wildlife and Plant Conservation in order to start construction.

On 9 September 2004, the government was granted order number 224/2547 in order to start the Chiang Mai Night Safari Administration Office, with Prodprasob Surasawadee as its director, and having the Chiang Mai Night Safari as an institute under the Special Area Development for Sustainable Tourism.

On 14 April 2019, the government under Prime Minister Prayut Chan-o-cha has a resolved to dissolve the Pinkanakorn Development Agency that supervises and manage Chiang Mai Night Safari and turn the command to the Zoological Park Organization under Ministry of Natural Resources and Environment.

== Zones ==
Chiang Mai Night Safari is separated into the following zones:

=== For tourists ===
- Main Building – Shops, meeting rooms, activity areas and animal-viewing points.
- Lake – At night, there are shows and the only place to see a dancing fountain in Thailand.
- The Giraffe Restaurant – The zoo's restaurant, serving both à la carte and buffet.
- Resort Hotel – Hotel rooms for tourists to stay overnight.

=== Attractions ===
- The Jaguar Trail Zone – A 1.2 kilometer walk around the lake, inside the zone includes:
  - Digital Zoo – Shows brought to live through technology.
  - Kids Zone – A children's playground and play area.
  - Tiger World – Includes a variety of tigers from around the world.
- The Predator Prowl Zone (North) – A zone that features carnivorous animals.
- Savannah Safari Zone (South) – A zone that features herbivorous animals.

== Resort ==
The resort at Chiang Mai Night Safari is composed of five houses:

- Kum Payaa is a one-story house located in a forest.
- Piroon Pana is a group of houses consisting of 8 independent units in a forest with all facilities.
- Safari Doii is a one-story house consisting of 3-4 independent units in a forest with all necessities.
- Phrueksa Sawan is a one-story house consisting of 3-4 independent units in a forest with all necessities.
- Puang Chompoo is a one-story house consisting of 3-4 independent units in a forest with all necessities.

== Activities ==
- Digital Zoo – An activity consisting of many technology-based attractions, including an interactive wall, an interactive floor, a laser gun game, 3D puppets, holograms, piano steps, and a multitouch table.
- Night Safari – A combination of two bus tours that drive around the zoo during the night. The two tours include the Predator Prowl and the Savannah Safari. This tour is exclusive to view some nocturnal animals.
- Day Safari – A tram ride through the zoo during the day. Tourists are also able to feed the animals during the ride.
- Behind the Zoo – An activity consisting of caring for animals, including the "Big 5" (elephants, hippopotamuses, bison, white rhinoceroses and giraffes). The activities give insight into what it is like caring for these animals.
- Jaguar Trail Zone – A 1.2 kilometer walking track around the lake. There are many animals alongside the track for viewing.

== Musical fountain ==
The Chiang Mai Night Safari has a multimedia musical fountain show. The fountain itself is 30 x 6 meters. The fountain consists of 1,200 water jets that are capable of creating a variety of water effects. The fountain is capable of creating a 40-meter wide and 15 meter high water screen with video and laser projectors capable of projecting on it. The project was built by the Emotion Media Factory.

To celebrate King Bhumibol Adulyadej's Diamond Jubilee, a special programme was shown for the event. The show included a video, lights, and lasers set to music that was composed by the king. The then-Prime Minister, Thaksin Shinawatra was thoroughly impressed with the show, and congratulated the managing directors, Helmut Dörner and Ralph Douw (Emotion Media Factory) on their excellent work.

== Gallery ==
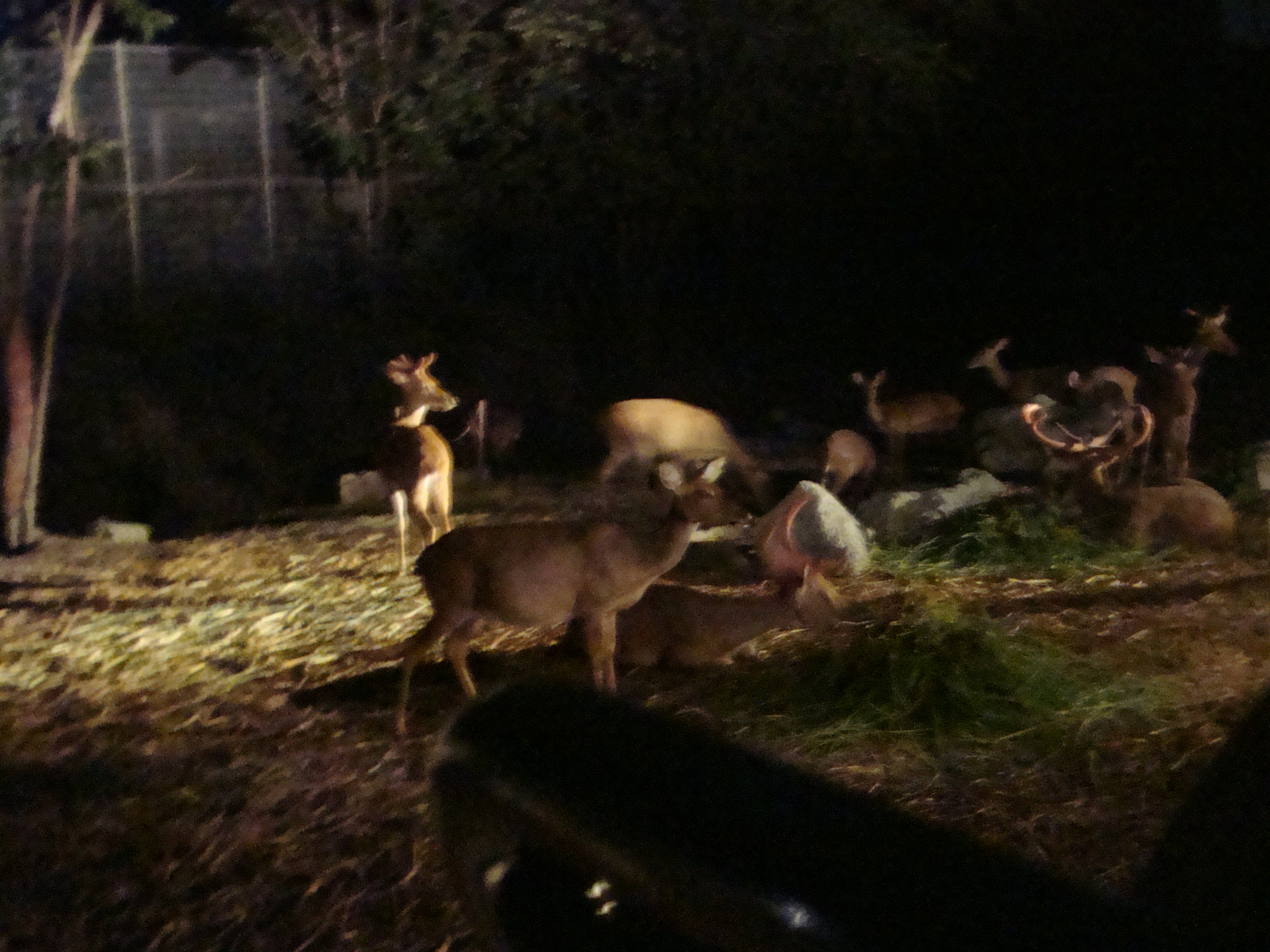
Animals in Savanna Safari Zone

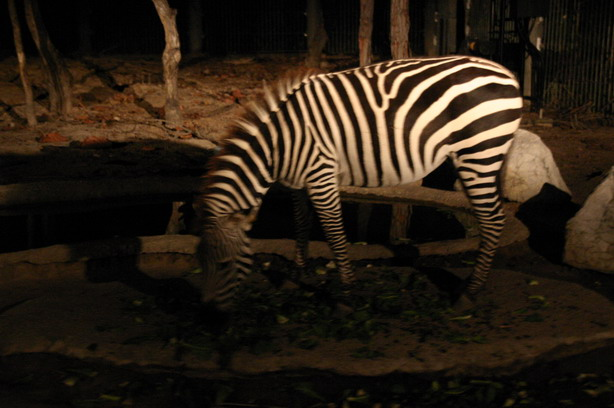
Zebra in Savanna Safari Zone

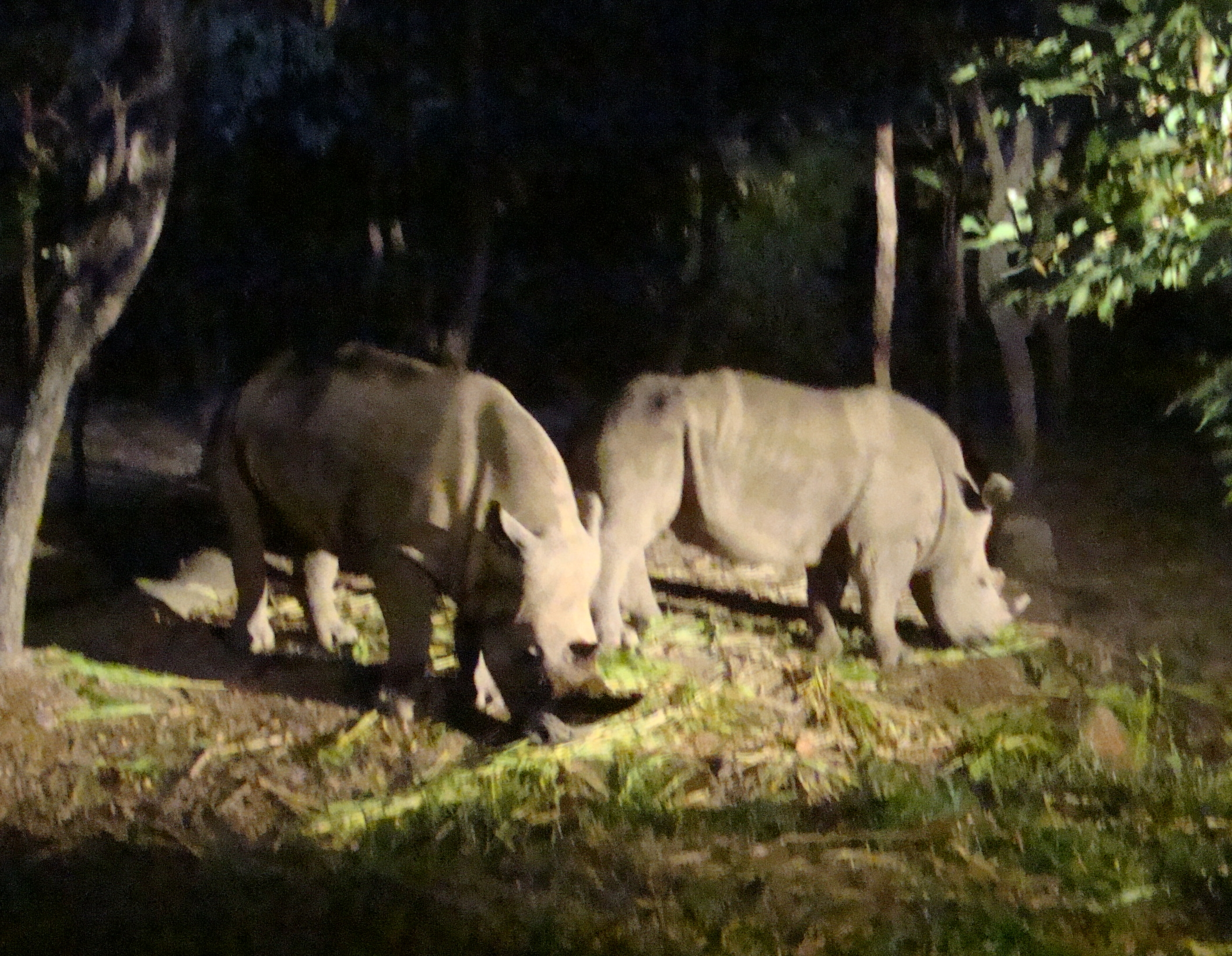
Rhinoceros in Savanna Safari Zone

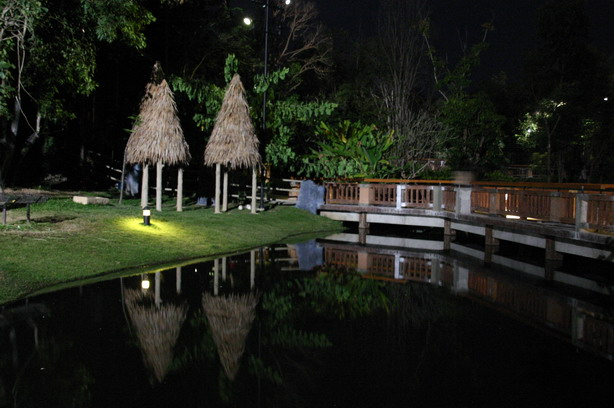
Wrapping around Swan Lake in Jaguar Trail Zone

== See also ==
- Chiang Mai Zoo
- Fountain
- AIDA Cruises
- Romon U-Park
