= Abandoned mine =

Mine or quarry that is no longer operational

An abandoned mine refers to a former mining or quarrying operation that is no longer in use and has no responsible entity to finance the cost of remediation and/or restoration of the mine feature or site. Such mines are typically left unattended and may pose safety hazards or cause environmental damage without proper maintenance. The term incorporates all types of old mines, including underground shaft mines and drift mines, and surface mines, including quarries and placer mining. Typically, the cost of addressing the mine's hazards is borne by the public/taxpayers/the government.An abandoned mine may be a hazard to health, safety or environment.

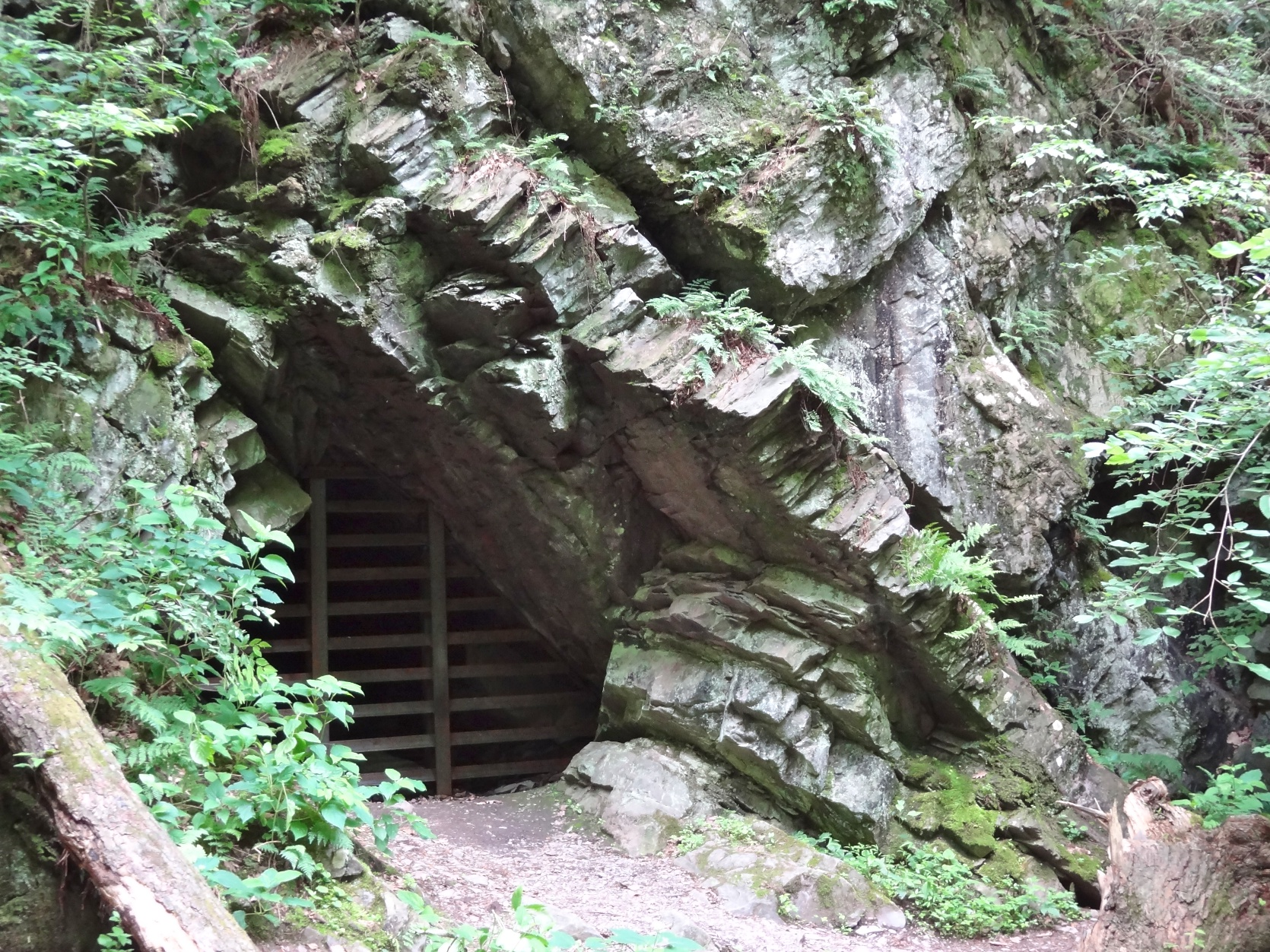
Pahaquarry Copper Mine adit, New Jersey, US

== Reclamation and reuse ==
Abandoned mines can be reclaimed by recultivation and renaturation. Recultivation aims to restore the scenic and economic features of the affected area. Often recultivation means converting abandoned mine sites to productive agricultural or forest lands. A major challenge is remediation of soil or dealing with waste heaps. Renaturation is less intrusive.

Some abandoned mines may be reused for pumped-storage hydropower.

== Abandoned mines by country ==
=== United States ===
In the United States, there are thousands of abandoned mines. The precise number of abandoned mines in the United States remains unknown, ranging "from the National Park Service's tally of 2,500 on its lands to the Mineral Policy Center's assessment of 560,000 abandoned mines on public and privately owned lands." Many of these abandoned mines are associated with abandoned neighboring towns often referred to as ghost towns. Experts strongly warn against entering or exploring old or abandoned mines. In California, Nevada, Colorado, New Mexico, and Arkansas, there are over 6,500 abandoned mines, according to infographic.

Definition of "abandoned mine" varies by government department. The Bureau of Land Management defines abandoned mines as mines that were abandoned before January 1, 1981, the effective date of the Bureau of Land Management's Surface Management regulations issued under the authority of the Federal Land Policy and Management Act of 1976, as amended (43 U.S.C. 1701 et seq.) Meanwhile, the Environmental Protection Agency's classification Abandoned mine lands (AMLs) are those lands, waters, and surrounding watersheds where extraction, beneficiation or, processing of ores and minerals has occurred.

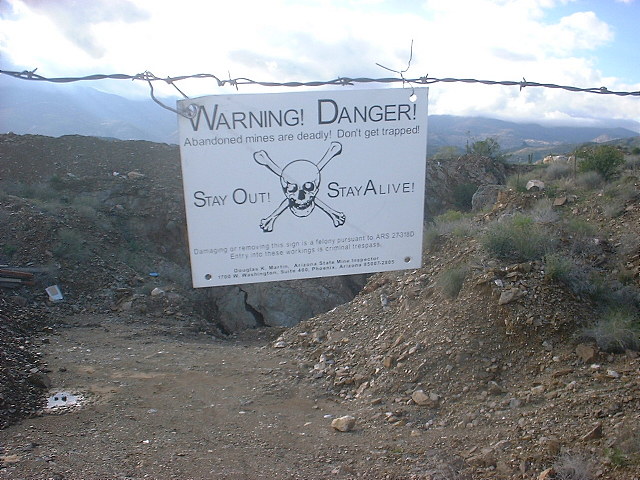
Danger sign at an old Arizona mine

In the U.S., the estimation is that approximately 80% of the abandoned mine lands (AML) sites pose physical safety hazards and require more work in determining the proper safety of these lands.

Every year, dozens are injured or killed in recreational accidents on mine property. The leading causes of accidental deaths on abandoned mine properties are drownings in open quarries and ATV accidents. The U.S. Department of Labor notes that since 1999, "more than 200 people have died in recreational accidents at the surface and underground active and abandoned operations across the country." Due to these circumstances, the Mine Safety and Health Administration launched the "Stay Out – Stay Alive" campaign, which is a national public awareness campaign aimed at warning and educating children and adults about the dangers of exploring and playing on active and abandoned mine sites.

In the U.S., the Abandoned Mine Land Initiative, launched by the Western Governor's Association and the National Mining Association is also an effort focusing on reporting the number of high-priority AML sites. The initiative identifies, measures, and reports on the progress of current reclamation cleanup programs on an annual basis. In the Americas region, the United Nations Environment Programme (UNEP) and the Chilean Copper Commission (COCHILCO) co-hosted a workshop to address the problem of abandoned or "orphaned" mines. Including a representative from the UN, ten countries were represented from North, Central, and South America with an eleventh participant being Japan.

==== Legislation: Surface Mining Control and Reclamation Act ====
It can be hazardous and detrimental to reside close to an abandoned coal mining site. The Surface Mining Control and Reclamation Act (SMCRA) was passed in 1977 in two parts: one to control the effects of active mines, and one to regulate abandoned mines. SMCRA also initiated an abandoned mine land fund, in which a fee was charged for each ton of coal produced. This revenue was distributed in part to the United Mine Workers Association (UMWA) towards retirement funds, as well as to the Office of Surface Mining Reclamation and Enforcement (OSMRE) to continue operations. There is still around $2 billion in undistributed funds thus far.

=== Canada ===
- National Orphaned/Abandoned Mines Initiative – Orphaned or abandoned mines are those mines for which the owner cannot be found or, the owner is financially unable or unwilling to carry out clean-up. They pose environmental, health, safety, and economic problems to communities, the mining industry, and governments in many countries, including Canada.
- The Ontario Mining Act describes "abandoned mines" as old land previously used for coal mining unused due to hazardous environmental and health effects.

There are approximately 10,139 abandoned mines currently in Canada. Research is being done to utilize geothermal systems in these abandoned mines as a renewable heating source and has shown to be quite cost-efficient.

=== Chile ===
A 2003–2005 survey by the National Geology and Mining Service published in 2007 counted 213 abandoned mines and mining facilities in Chile. Some particularly dangerous or environmentally hazardous mines assessed as such by experts in 2011 are Faena Casilla (iodine) in Tarapacá Region, Montecristo (copper) in Antofagasta Region, La Higuera (copper, gold) in Coquimbo Region, Ex Minera Las Palmas (gold) in Maule Region and Ex Central Plegarias (coal) in Biobío Region. Some abandoned mines are in use by artisanal miners known as chuculleros.

=== Germany ===
After German reunification, a major remediation project was launched for Wismuth AG, on which more than 7 billion euros had already been spent by 2026.

== See also ==
- Mine caps
- Pirquinero
- RECLAIM Act
