= Musical fountain =

Type of animated fountain for entertainment purposes

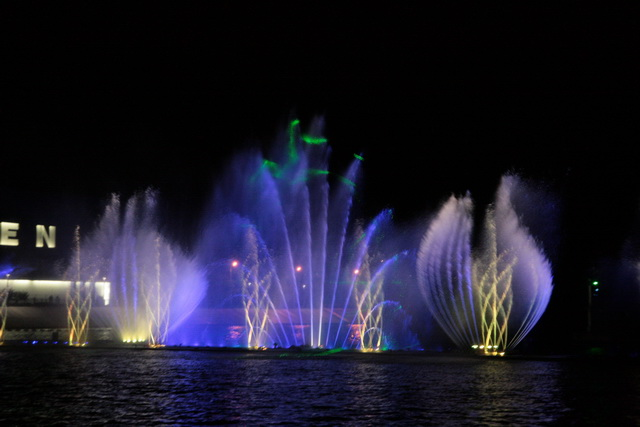
The Roshen Musical Fountain in Ukraine

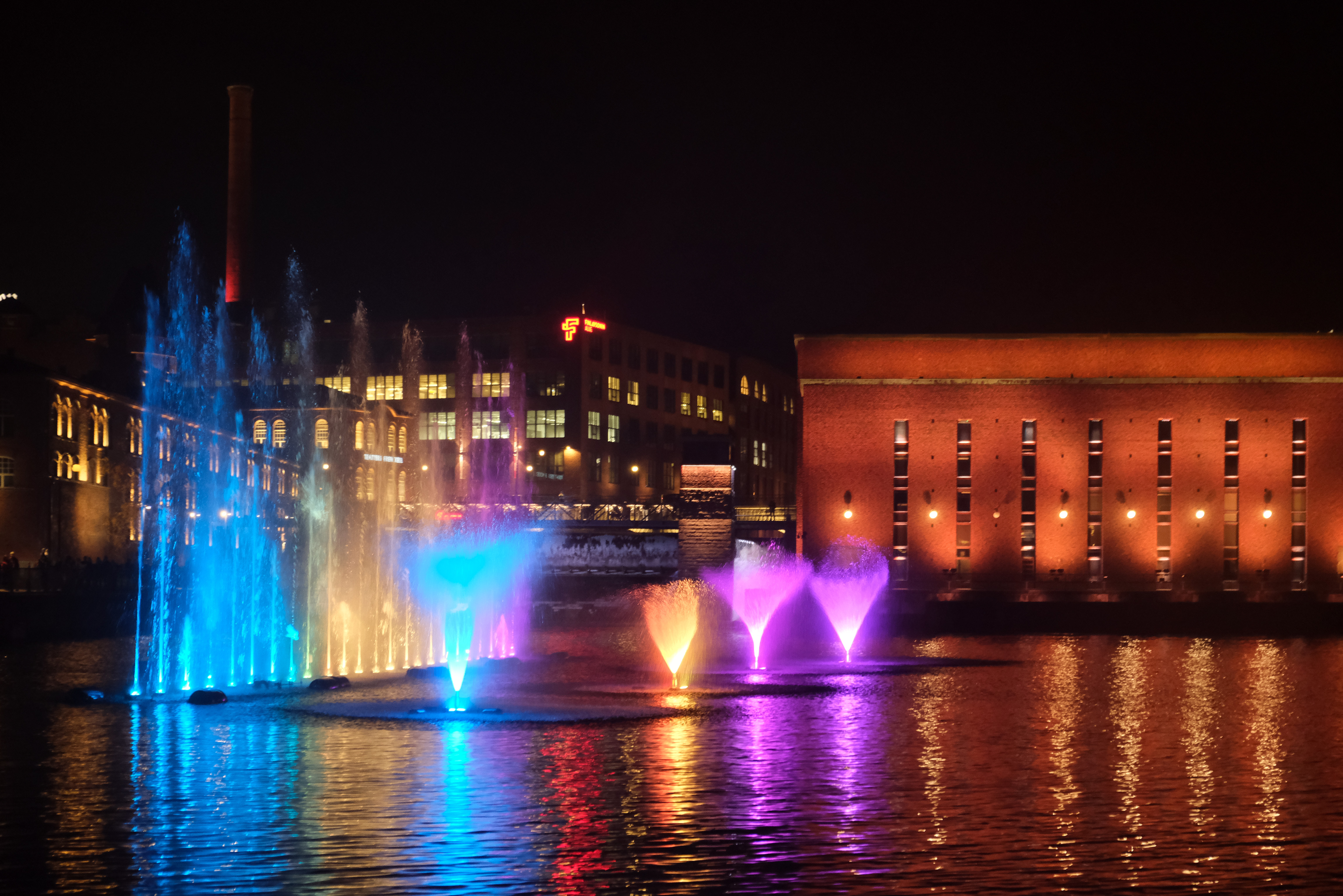
The Tammerkoski's musical fountains during the 2020 Light Festival in Tampere, Finland

A musical fountain, also known as a fairy fountain, prismatic fountain or dancing fountain, is a type of choreographed fountain that creates aesthetic designs as a form of entertainment. The displays are commonly synchronised to music and also feature lighting effects that are refracted and reflected by the moving water. Contemporary multimedia fountains can include lasers, video projection and three-dimensional imagery.

Installations can be large scale, employing hundreds of water jets and lights, and costing into the millions of dollars. Techniques tend to be complex, and require mechanical, hydraulic, electrical, and electronic components that are usually kept out of view.

== Fountains that are choreographed to music ==
The earliest musical fountains were played manually by a live operator, who usually controlled pumps or valves and sometimes lights by way of switches on a control panel. Music was almost always live. Later, choreography could be prerecorded on a punched paper card which was scanned by a computer; and even later, it could be recorded on magnetic tape or, in the most modern shows, on a CD or in an app along with the music. In most automated examples, the choreography is still painstakingly programmed by hand, while some shows are still played live from a control console (sometimes recorded for automatic playback). Recent advances in technology provides for unattended automatic choreography that can rival manual programming.

== The earliest choreographed musical fountains ==
=== The Bodor Fountain ===
Péter Bodor (June 22, 1788 – August 17, 1849) was a Hungarian mechanical engineer who built a musical or chiming fountain in the Transylvanian town of Marosvásárhely (now Târgu Mureş, Romania) between 1820 and 1822. His fountain had a round floor-plan, with two arched stairs on the sides, and a dome roof supported by six pillars. The mechanical core was a hydraulic structure driven by the force of water that played popular chimes at every six hours. There was a gilded Neptune (or Apollo) statue on the top, that turned round in 24 hours. The musical device was destroyed in 1836 by a snow storm, and was never restored. The fountain itself was demolished in 1911. An almost identical copy was built on Margaret Island of Budapest in 1935−1936 that did not operate by hydraulic means, but used electricity instead.

=== Křižík's light fountain ===
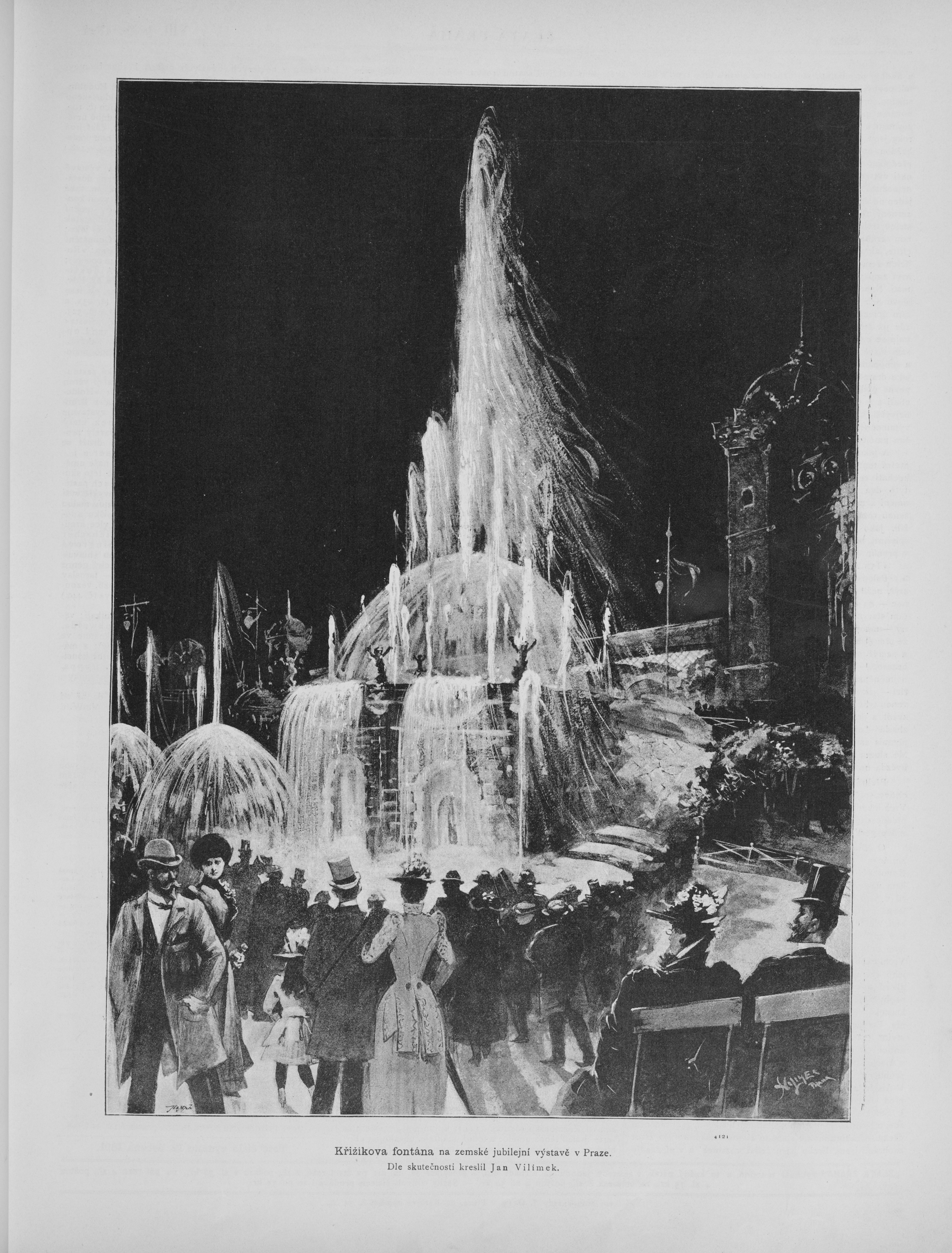
Křižík's light fountain in 1891

Křižík's light fountain was built by the Czech inventor and electrical engineer František Křižík in 1891 on the occasion of the World Exhibition in Prague. It became a unique European attraction. The fountain was rebuilt in the 1920s by architect Z. Stašek. The bottom of the fountain plate is equipped with 1300 multicolored reflectors and water circuits composed of more than two kilometers of pipes with almost 3000 nozzles. In 2018–2021 the fountain was closed.

=== The work of F. W. Darlington ===
F. W. Darlington was a pioneer in electrical fountain control as well as water design.

==== Prismatic Fountain, Denver, Colorado ====
In 1908, Darlington constructed a fountain in Denver City Park lake at a cost of US$19,577 (equivalent to $685,000 in 2024). It featured eleven colored light streams that were controlled by an operator. In 2009, the fountain was restored using modern technology for US$3,200,000.

==== Prismatic Fountain, New Orleans, Louisiana ====
The Darlington fountain in West End, New Orleans, was likely completed around 1915 or 1916 as the last date on the original drawings are from February 1915. The fountain served as an icon for the West End Park and surrounding yacht clubs and numerous restaurants that were located in the area.

All of Darlington's fountains required an operator to change the water effects and lighting and were likely used in conjunction with music played by a band or orchestra for special events. It is unknown if the fountain was operated in a static mode when there were no performances or if it was shut off.

Restoration of this fountain is planned by the Friends of West End in New Orleans.

==== Garfield Park, Indianapolis, Indiana ====
In 1915, the new greenhouses and conservatory were built in Garfield Park, Indianapolis. The dedication of the Sunken Garden took place on October 29, 1916. In 1916, Darlington was hired to design and build the fountains at the east end of the Sunken Garden. The fountains were the first in the country to be equipped with the mechanics that allowed the changing of the spray and displayed lights according to the season and holiday. For Memorial Day, the fountain's lights were alight with red, white, and blue, and on other days, gold and white. The fountains are still an attraction for visitors. The fountain was restored by The Fountain People in 1997 and with a musical control system by Atlantic Fountains in 2003.

==== Pool of Industry, 1939 New York World's Fair ====
An early example of a musical fountain choreographed live was the Pool of Industry at the 1939 New York World's Fair, where three operators controlled the fountain, guided by a paper program that unscrolled under a glass window like the paper roll of a player piano. However, rather than controlling the effects directly like a piano roll, it was marked with commands that told the operators when to push the buttons and throw the switches. The fountain was more than just water and lights. Besides 3 million watts of lights and a gigantic pool containing 1,400 water nozzles, there were over 400 gas jets with a mechanism that caused colored flames and fireworks were shot from over 350 launchers, creating a nighttime spectacle on a grand scale. Music was played live by the fair's band and broadcast by large speakers to the areas surrounding the display. The updated show displayed at the same fairgrounds in 1964 lacked the colored flames but used punched cards for the choreography, had prerecorded music, and utilized the then-revolutionary system of dichroic light filtering (developed by Bausch and Lomb for the fountain) which now allowed a dark colored lens and a light colored lens to produce the same brightness of light. It was by this process that 700,000 watts of light produced over 3 megacandelas. This show also had single lights with multiple sliding color filters for mixing colors, and arrays of nozzles that could be adjusted, their direction changed by hydraulic or pneumatic actuators.

== Later water fountains ==
The Dancing Waters style of water show is a linear display of pumps and lights. In the United States, similar fountains are the Musical Waters. Musical Waters shows use the basic Dancing Waters mechanics. The fountains use single-speed pumps and do not offer variable water heights, and the revolving nozzles are not present since the Dancing Waters design having been prone to jamming. Despite lacking the rotating nozzles that usually define this type of show, the Musical Waters shows are one of the few of this kind that still retain most of the simple elegance that defined Otto Przystawik's first fountains, including the visual attraction of the human element with live "fountaineers" controlling the effects. Otto Przystawik water shows went well beyond previous musical fountains. While previous fountain merely change scenes during a performance, Przystawik introduced moving water that created the first true Dancing Fountains.

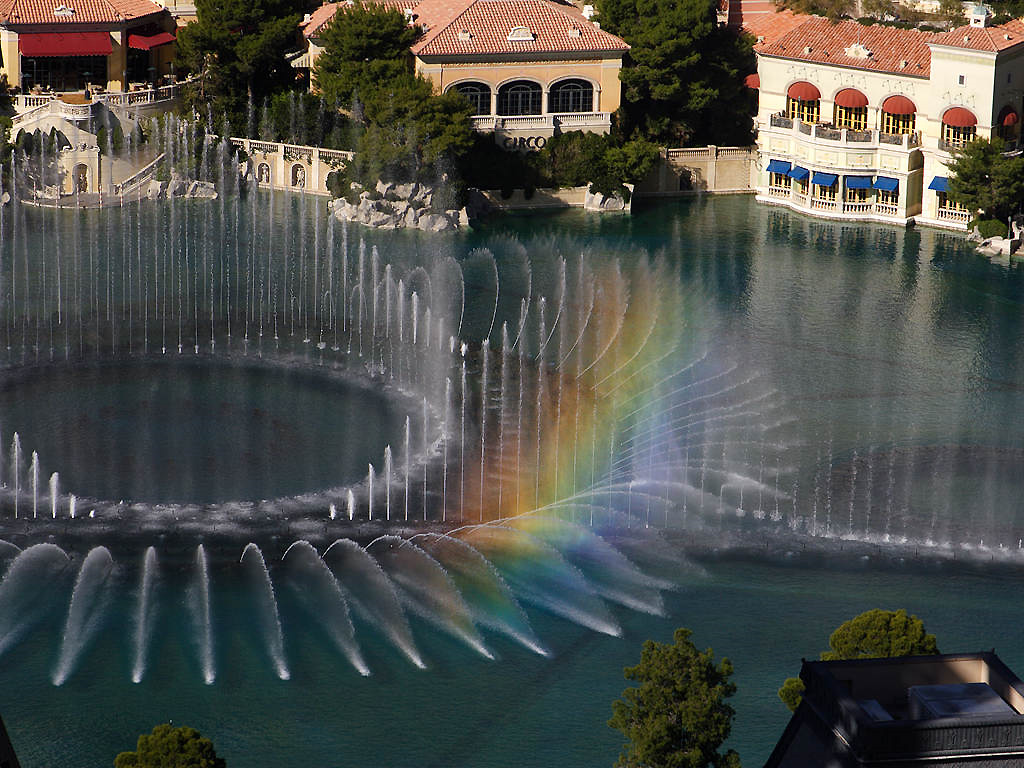
Dancing fountains at the Bellagio in Las Vegas

Other United States based companies such as Waltzing Waters Inc, owned by Przystawik's family, WET (Water Entertainment Technologies), Fontana Fountains, Atlantic Fountains, Fountain People, Formosa Fountains, Hall Fountains, and Waterworks International have built fully computer controlled musical fountains since 1980. These include two-to-six-meter (6 ft 7 in to 19 ft 8 in) wide systems available to the homeowner as well as large corporate, municipal and show fountains in excess of fifty meters in length—and in the case of WET's Fountains of Bellagio, 9 acres (3.6 ha) in size. These include proportional, interactive and audio spectral control that bring musical fountains to a wide audience. Fountain shapes are not limited to linear layout stage shows but include geometric and freeform shapes as well. Moreover, latest technology allows the construction of floating watershows. Fontana Fountains first introduced the use of stainless-steel floaters allowing bigger water show applications even in coasts and lakes.

Manufacturers in the Near and Far East, in places such as India and Pakistan, also produce musical fountains. Many of them have updated the look with individually servomotor-controlled nozzles, large water screens on which video can be projected, and laser effects. Shows are built not only in the standard linear form, but in circular, semicircular and oblong shapes, in multiple pools, and many other layouts. In many places in India, a musical fountain is a must-have attraction for any city, and there will often be at least one local company ready to build them. Firms also rent shows.

=== International Fountain ===
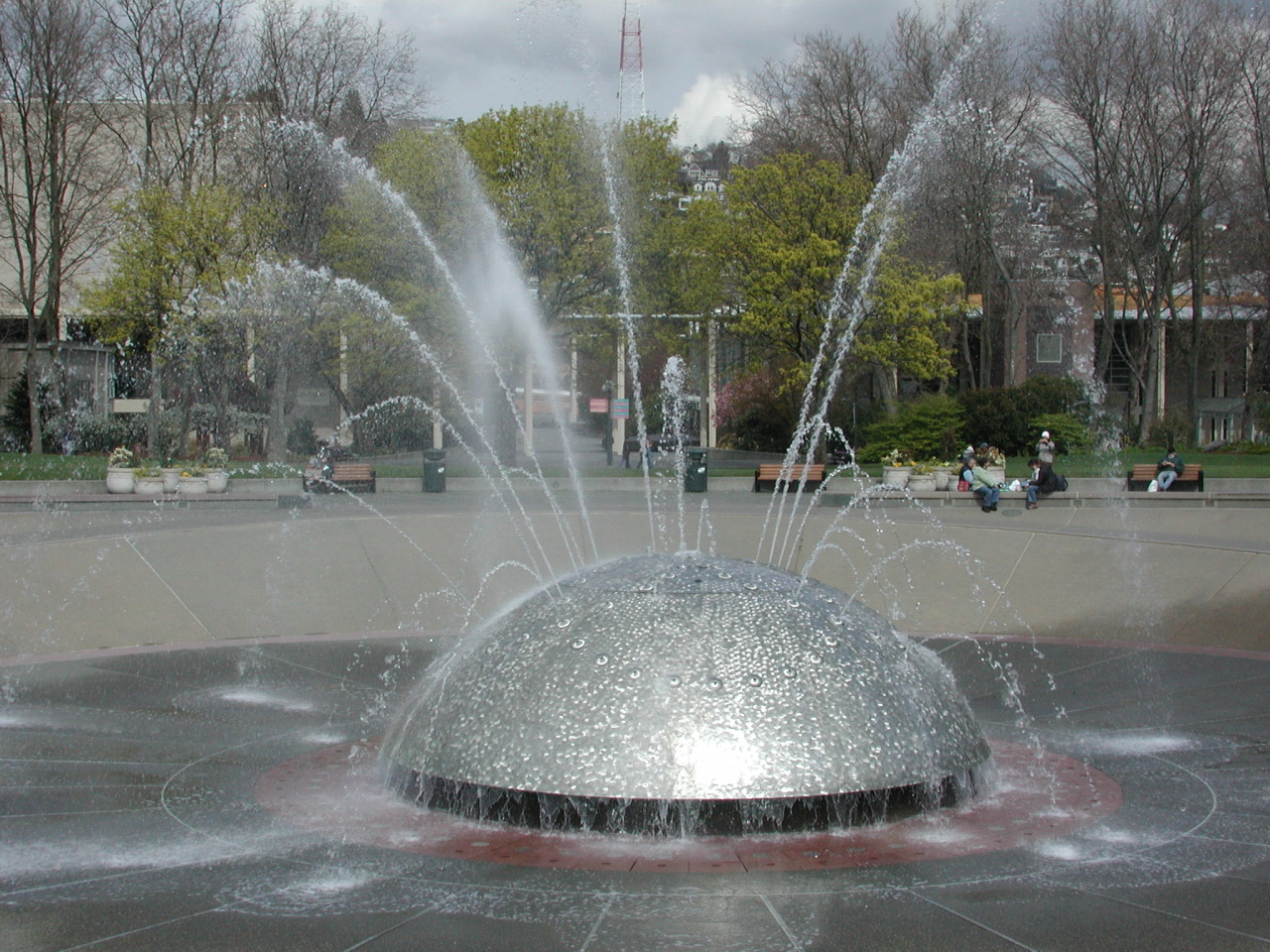
International Fountain in Seattle, Washington

Built for the Century 21 Exposition in Seattle in 1962, the International Fountain's original design had changing water and light patterns, with a background of classical music (though the patterns weren't specifically intended to be synched with the music.) The fountain was very large, designed as a concrete bowl around a 'moonscape' of broken limestone, at the center of which was a tiled dome studded with pointy black nozzles. The fountain was not originally designed for interaction but was redesigned in 1995 by WET to make the fountain more inviting, interactive and safe. Switching out the multicolored lights for white, WET added fog nozzles, a ring of their MicroShooters set into the pavers around the base of the dome, and four large SuperShooters hidden in the upper surface of the dome. The restored fountain behaves as its predecessor did for most of the day, producing changing water patterns as music plays, but it now marks each hour & half hour by bringing out other effects such as fog, and performs a choreographed show. The white lights were later changed to color RGB fixtures in 2021 by WET.

=== CESC Fountain of Joy, Kolkata ===
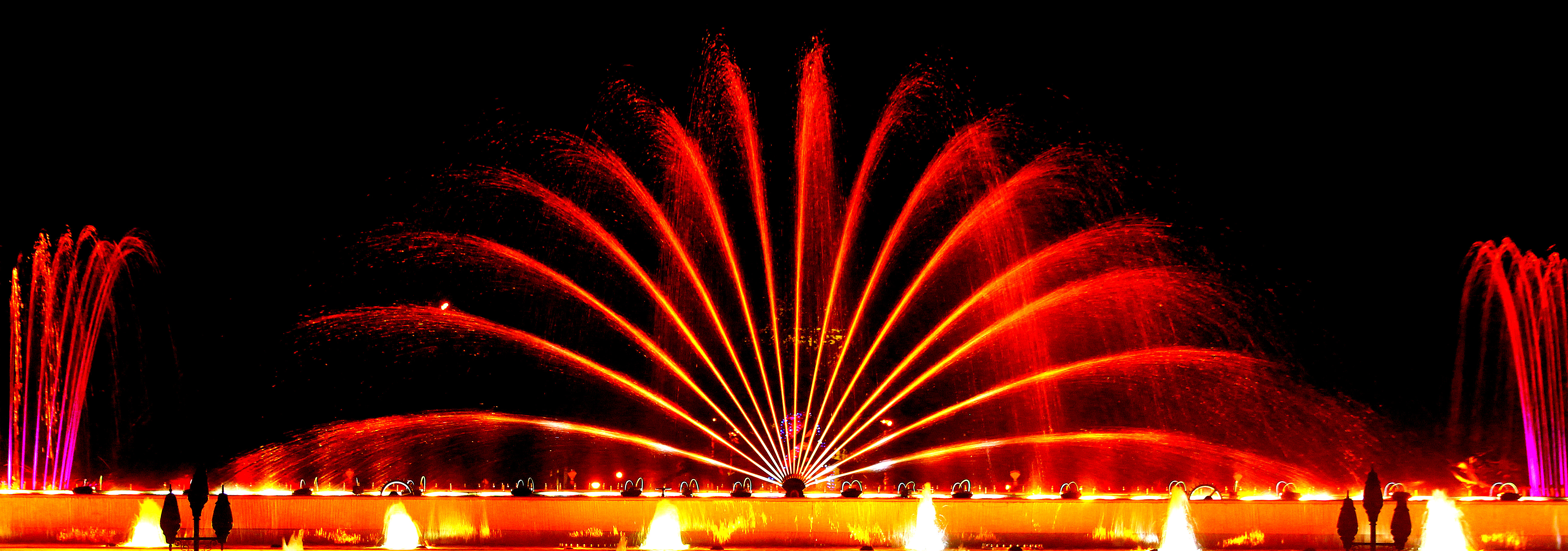
CESC Fountain of Joy, Kolkata

The CESC Fountain of Joy was inaugurated in 1991 in Kolkata, India, as part of the tricentennial celebrations. In 2005, it was shut down due to technical problems. The fountain was reopened in October 2012 following a ₹3 crore (US$561,000) renovation.

CESC Fountain of Joy

The fountain features 150 channels available for water and light effects while the old fountain had only 20 water spouts. It has a centre-fed circular water screen of 6-metre (20 ft) height and 18-metre (59 ft) width. In the upper pool, the CESC Fountain of Joy has 99 water effects, while the intermediate pool has 20 water effects and another 30 special water effects in the lower pool. It features a large water cascading area – more than 80 metres (260 ft) long from upper pool to the intermediate pool. The CESC Fountain of Joy comes with an enormous number of lights including LED, PAR lamps and high watt reflectors, capable of constantly changing the colours to make the fountain attractive and eye-catching. According to CESC sources, the Fountain of Joy is integrated with ultra-fast technology, in which water effects will be controlled by the pneumatically assisted solenoid valves, capable of opening and shutting 12 times in a second, thereby resulting in water shooting in air at a spectacular speed. One of the project engineer's claimed that "the concept of a three-tier fountain pool surrounded by architectural and dynamic fountains in the intermediate and lower pools is quite unique in this subcontinent".

=== Fountains of Bellagio Hotel ===
Bellagio musical fountain

WET (Water Entertainment Technologies) also designed the Fountains of Bellagio in Las Vegas, which are set in a man-made lake 1,000 feet (300 m) long with an area of 9 acres (3.6 ha). The fountain is formed as a pair of large concentric rings and a long, curved arc, and two smaller circles are attached to the arc near each end. Shooters outline all aspects of the layout, allowing for the arc and circles to rise as columns and curtains of water, as well as providing high-speed chase sequences. Re-engineered HyperShooters fire jets nearly 240 feet (73 m) into the air, and more recently added ExtremeShooters are capable of reaching heights of 500 feet (150 m). Needing a better way to define smoother passages of music, WET engineers developed the Oarsman nozzle, a robotic water jet that can be moved 120 degrees from side to side, to front and back, grouped with a pod of lights that follow the water stream. With the direction, water height, and light of every Oarsman controllable independently from every other Oarsman, a nearly infinite variety of patterns can be created on the lake.

A fog generating device rises from beneath the water to blanket the entire lake with fog, and about 4000 individually controllable underwater lights follow the water patterns' precise movements, sparkling on the water or glowing through the fog. Performing to everything from opera to classical to Broadway to pop, the Fountains of Bellagio run every day on the half-hour, and every quarter-hour during the evening. A team of dive-certified engineers is on-site at all times, maintaining the fountain's complex mechanical, electrical and hydraulic systems.

Despite the scale of such shows as the Fountains of Bellagio, these shows must still be programmed and choreographed by hand. Computers aid the process, but engineers must still spend weeks or months on each new performance before it is ready to be placed in rotation with the other shows.

=== Branson Landing ===
Branson Landing located in Branson, Missouri, features a picturesque boardwalk along the Taneycomo Lakefront. The Landing's center attraction is the Town Square, which is home to a $7.5 million choreographed water attraction designed by WET. The fountains at Branson Landing include dancing and blasting water shooters, blasting water up to 125 feet (38 m) in the air, fire, light and music.

=== Grand Haven ===
One other notable fountain of the choreographed type is the Grand Haven Musical Fountain in Grand Haven, Michigan. Built in 1962 by volunteers and designed by a local engineer, this fountain was based on a Przystawik show seen in Germany and was the largest musical fountain in the world when it was built. The display comprises a small number of water formations grouped in odd and even segments, with the same formations on each. Augmented by curtains of water at the back and front, a large fanlike array called the Peacock, and three fire hose nozzles—one placed vertically in the center, and the others aimed at an angle from each end—the show produces a simple Dancing Waters style display. Colored lights are arrayed along the front of the fountain in individually controllable groups in red, blue, amber, and white, and the back curtain and Peacock sprays have their own lights—green and yellow for the back curtain, and two sets each red, blue and amber for the Peacock. In addition, nozzles called "sweeps" provide the moving effects, swaying side-to-side.

A patented drive mechanism allows each pair of sweeps to follow or oppose each other in direction of movement, to move along long or short paths, and to move at any of three speeds, allowing the moving water to follow nearly any kind of music. The original show used punched paper cards, though computers control the new system. The nozzles and pumps have never been changed, only cleaned and maintained, and shows must still be programmed by hand. Even with the simplest of the many programs used to create shows for this fountain, choreographing one three-minute song can take anywhere from two to four hours. The Grand Haven Musical Fountain still performs nightly, and is viewable from a grandstand on the waterfront in Grand Haven.

=== Kangwon Land Multimedia Fountain ===
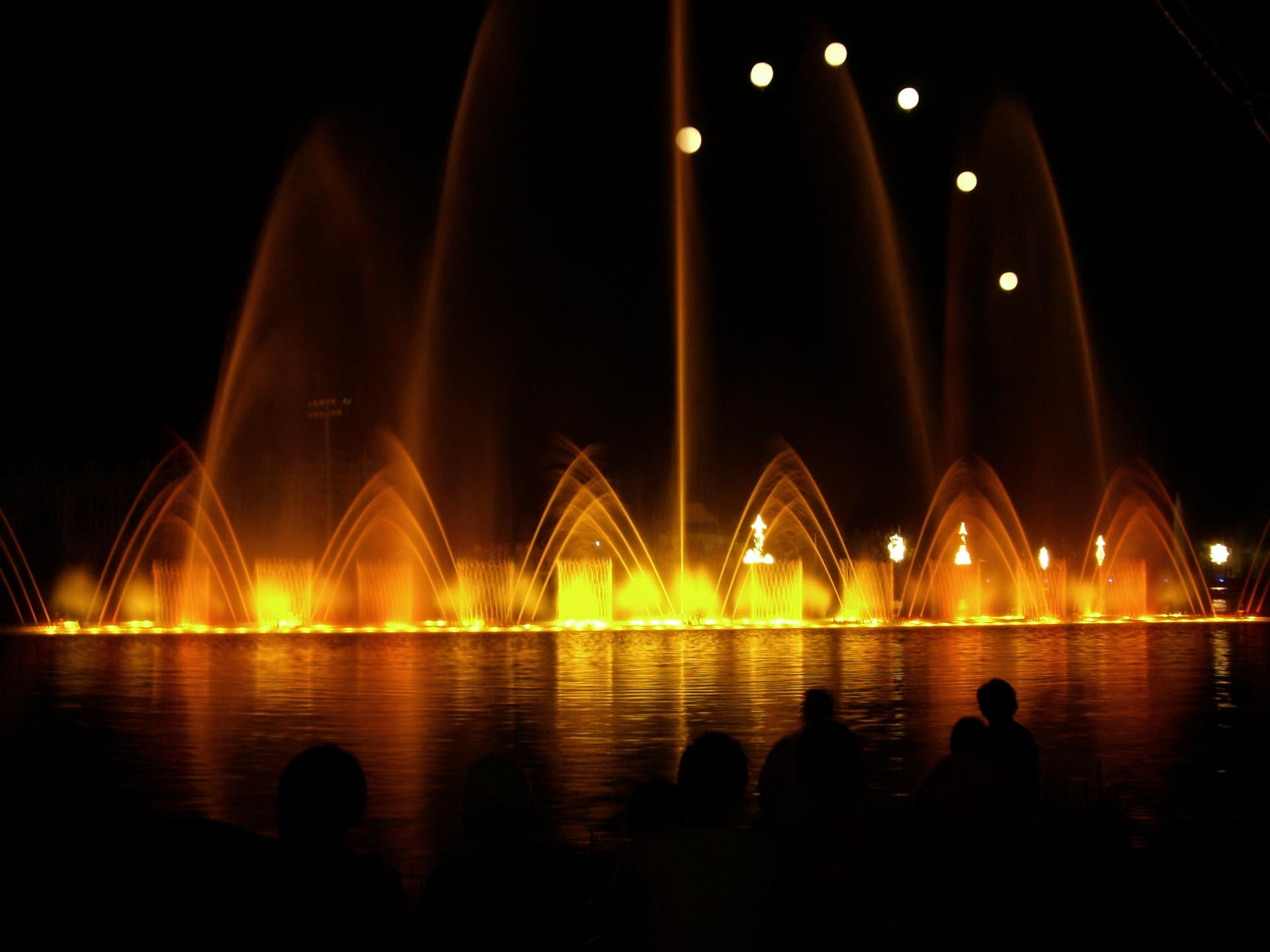
Multimedia Fountain Kangwon Land Resort

Multimedia Fountain Kangwon Land was opened in August 2007. It is considered Asia's largest musical fountain. Multimedia system consists of 180 m water fountains, water screen, video, light, 12 multi-coloured fire units, and laser. The Magical Box multimedia show consists of the big cube system and the fountain. In combination with the fountain during daylight hours the box appears mirrored, but at night it is illuminated to reveal its interior. At night a globe can be seen, some 20 meters (66 ft) in diameter. The special lighting effects give the impression that the globe is rotating and displays the five continents of the world.

Inside the globe is the "Dome Cinema". The "Dome Cinema" has a diameter of 18 meters and is used as the projection area. Video images from TV, DVD, or VHS sources are projected directly into the dome. These images fill almost two thirds of the space. As a result of the various depths of the room, a new laser video system is used to ensure that the images are not distorted. Outside the "Miracle World Box" is the largest fully automatic screen (24-by-24-meter (79 ft × 79 ft)) in the world. It uses lighting effects, laser projections and synchronized choreographies. All of the technology used in and around the "Miracle World Box" was designed, developed and installed by Emotion Media Factory.

=== Dubai Fountain ===
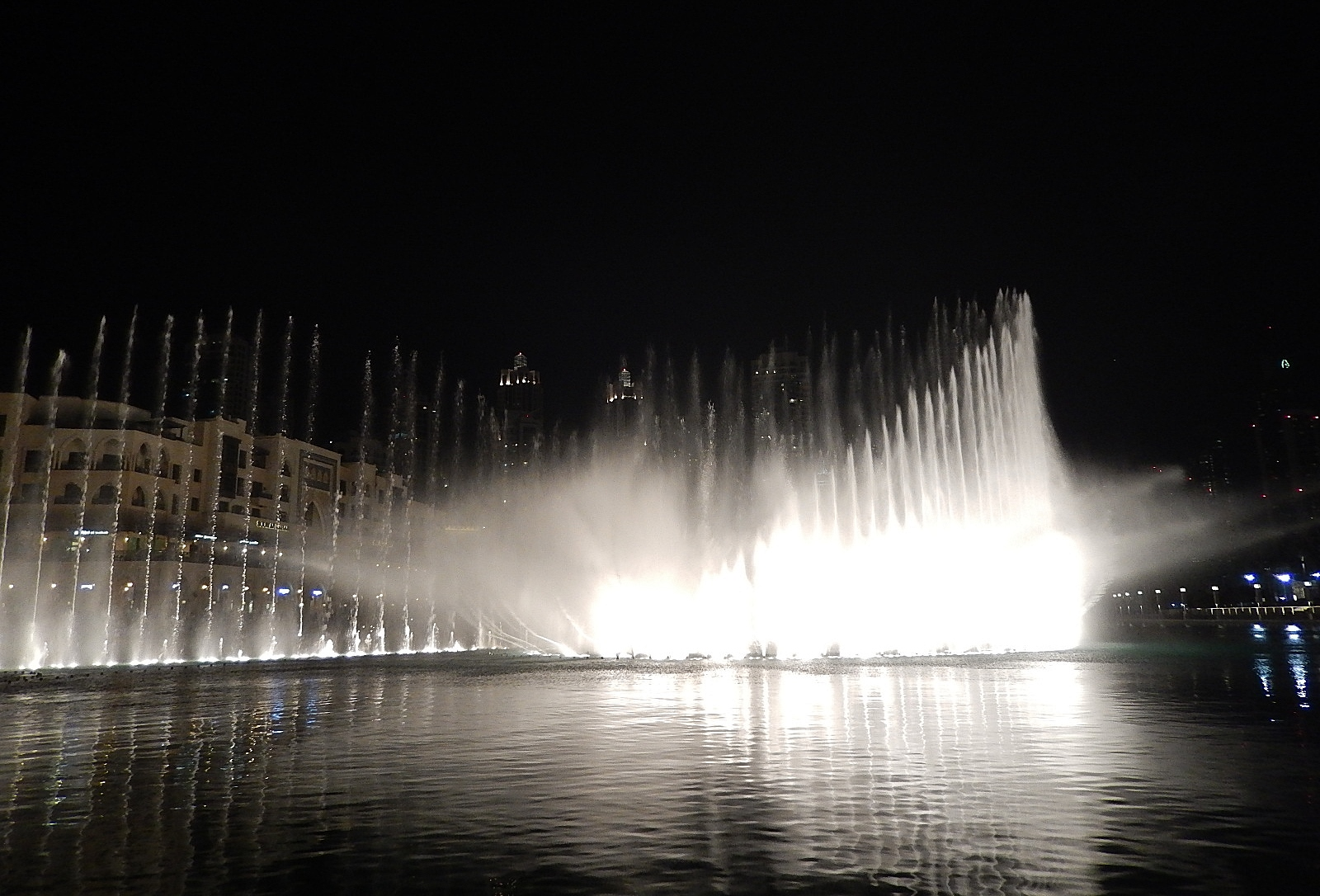
The Dubai Fountain in the United Arab Emirates (2013) is currently the largest and tallest musical fountain in the world

The largest musical fountain project in the world is the Dubai Fountain. It spans on the 30-acre (12 ha) manmade Burj Khalifa Lake. It was designed by WET Design, the California-based company responsible for the fountains at the Bellagio Hotel Lake in Las Vegas. It includes 6,600 lights, 25 colored projectors, and fog. It is 275 meters (902ft) long and shoots water 150 meters (490 ft) into the air (equivalent to a 50-story building), accompanied by a range of classical to contemporary Arabic and world music. It was built at a cost of 218 million dollars. The fountain was formally opened by Sheikh Mohammed bin Rashid Al Maktoum on May 8, 2009, along with the Dubai Mall. It is situated in front of the Burj Khalifa.

=== Disney's World of Color ===
World of Color is nighttime spectacular at Disney California Adventure Park, part of the Disneyland Resort in Anaheim, California. The entire show cost US$75,000,000 to design, manufacture, and build. The process of assembling, installing, and testing the show's numerous components and equipment in Paradise Bay spanned a period of approximately 15 months. It premiered on Friday June 11, 2010, as part of "Summer Nightastic!". Conceived by VP of Parades and Spectaculars Steve Davison and designed by Walt Disney Creative Entertainment, the show has more than 1,200 fountains and includes lights, water, fire, fog, and lasers, with high-definition projections on mist screens.

=== Disney Dreams! ===
Disney Dreams! was a nightly nighttime spectacular at Disneyland Paris, based on Peter Pan's shadow story and included scenes from many Disney Films. It included HD projections onto the castle, with pyrotechnics, synchronized fireworks. Water screens and fountains located in the moat of Le Château de la Belle au Bois Dormant were provided by the French company Aquatique Show. The project took 18 months to be entirely built, including tests and changes, and cost €10,000,000 (~$13,000,000). It ran daily at the park until March 2017, when it was replaced by Disney Illuminations, which utilizes the same technology.

=== Opryland Hotel Delta Fountain ===
Located indoors in Nashville, Tennessee, under a glass dome at the Gaylord Opryland Resort & Convention Center, this musical fountain features an 85-foot (26 m) high center geyser surrounded by 68 vertical and 28 arching jets, each with its own RGB LED fixture, plus a fog system and 5 articulating color theatrical lights from above. The sophisticated system was designed by water feature specialists Aquatic Creations, Inc., and plays original music shows choreographed by H2Oarts.com, both of California. The Delta fountain is on a deck rather than in a basin, so it is possible to experience close enough to get lightly misted.

=== Blackpool Pleasure Beach fountains ===
The Blackpool fountains, created by French company Aquatique Show, are located at the Blackpool Pleasure Beach in the UK. The fountains dance every 30 minutes to a range of music. They opened in 2009 letting people run through them. In 2010, people were barred from entering them due to health and safety. Security guards are present during the show at the attraction. The fountain has 25 jets which can shoot up to 100 feet (30 m).

=== Multimedia fountain Roshen ===
Multimedia Fountain Roshen, Vinnytsia, Ukraine

Multimedia fountain Roshen is located in Vinnytsia, a city in west-central Ukraine, on the banks of the Southern Buh. Built in 2011, it is considered one of the largest floating fountains in Europe. It is the major multimedia attraction in the city.

The multimedia shows combine water effects (fountain), music, lasers, and 3D projection on the water screen. For the fountain shows, powerful LED lights are used allowing the application of bright and showy backlighting resulting in various picturesque effects. Unlike other fountains in Ukraine, the Roshen multimedia fountain has moving particles reaching verticality in which the water spring angle changes dynamically. The sound power of the audio system is 3840 watts. The height of the central spring reaches 65 to 70 metres (213 to 230 ft), the projection screen dimension is about 16 metres (52 ft) high and 45 metres (148 ft) wide, and the frontal water dispersion constitutes 140 metres (460 ft). The project design and development was performed by Emotion Media Factory.

=== Aquanura at the Efteling ===
Opened in May 2012, Aquanura boasts being the largest water fountain show in Europe and the third largest in the world. It was built on a lagoon near the main entrance of the Efteling, one of Europe's oldest and largest theme parks. Aquanura means "water frogs" and tells the story of The Frog Prince by the Brothers Grimm in a spectacle of water, music, lights, and fire. The water fountain was designed and built by WET and features over 200 brightly colored fountains in a 12-minute-show each day. The show premiered for the 60th anniversary of the theme park and can be seen daily. It is included in the entrance price to the Efteling; however during the summer, separate tickets are sold for viewing just Aquanura.

Before Aquanura opened, the Efteling had an indoor musical fountain ('waterorgan'). It used to be hand-operated, with pedals and levers, but was later automated. When it opened in 1966, it had live music, but as of 1979, a recording was used. The waterorgan was put out of operation in August 2010, its venue being reused as a studio for a children's television program. It is not clear whether the installation has only been covered up temporarily, or if it has been permanently removed.

== Fully automated musical fountains ==
Miracle Mile Automated Musical Fountain, Las Vegas

While all pre-programmed musical fountain shows involve computerized show control systems, the use of computer technology to spontaneously "self-choreograph" a fountain to random musical input is novel. Unlike conventional musical fountains, which must be manually pre-programmed moment-to-moment, a fully automated musical fountain uses the venue's own live background music to animate the water and lights in real time.

=== Celebrate... Tokyo Disneyland! ===
Celebrate... Tokyo Disneyland! is a nighttime show based on Disneyland's Remember... Dreams Come True and The Magic, Memories, And You. It uses the technology for World of Color and Disney Dreams and all of the past and current nighttime shows from all over the world. Portions of Remember... Dreams Come True was edited to fit Tokyo Disneyland. The show ended in April 2019, but all the tech is there to this date.
