= Souk Al Bahar =

Market in Dubai, United Arab Emirates

Souk Al Bahar سوق البحار داون تاون
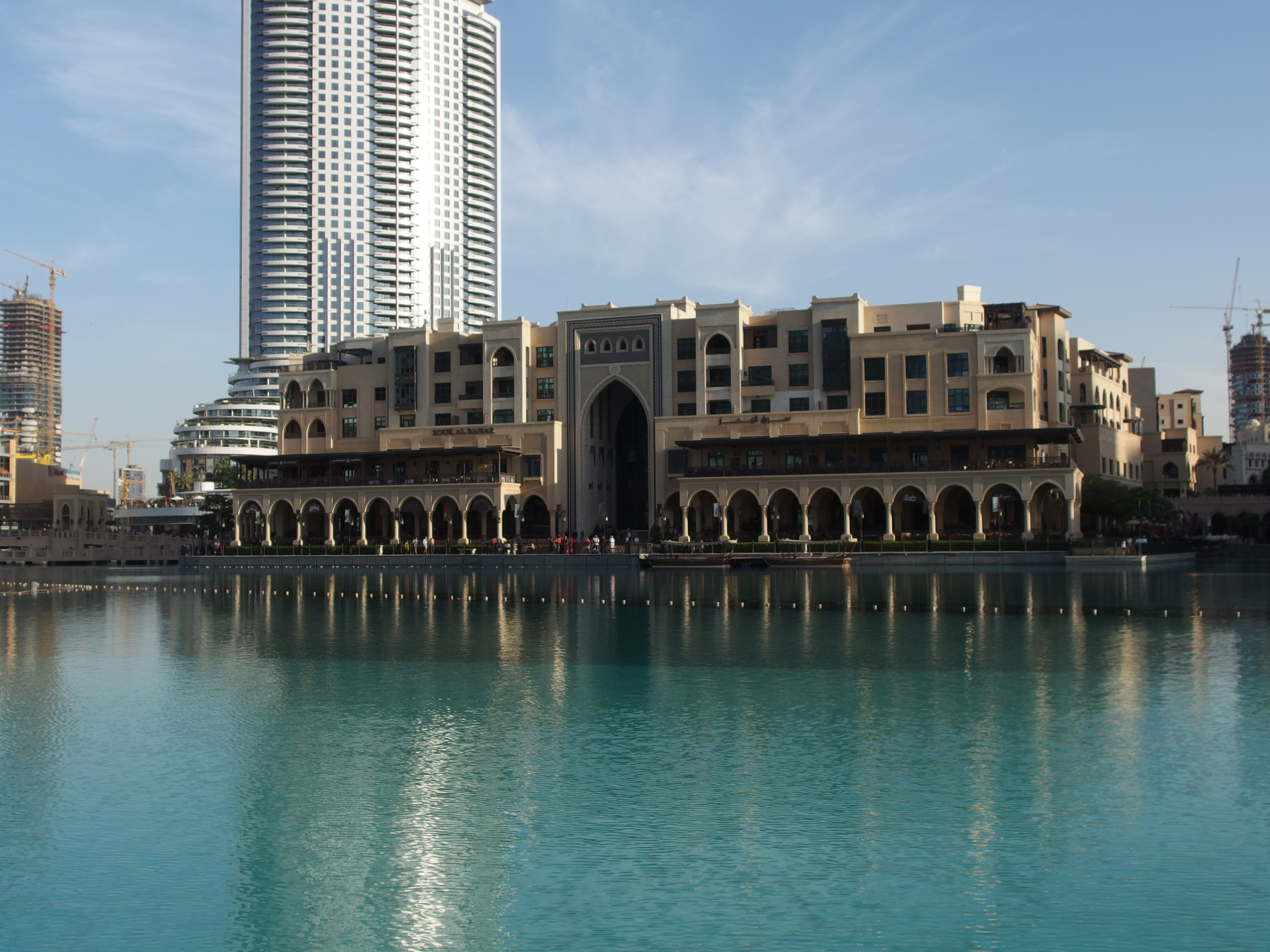
- Exterior of the souk
- Location: Sheikh Mohammed bin Rashid Boulevard, Downtown Dubai; Bur Dubai, Dubai, United Arab Emirates; 25°11′40.7″N 55°16′35.37″E
- Opening date: November 2008
- Developer: Emaar Developments
- Goods sold: Luxury
- Number of tenants: 100
- Parking: 900
- Website: https://www.emaarmalls.ae/malls/souk-al-bahar/
- Interactive map of Souk Al Bahar

Souk Al Bahar (Arabic: سوق البحار داون تاون) is a market (or souk) in Dubai, United Arab Emirates (UAE). It is located in Downtown Dubai, right across from the Burj Khalifa. It was built in 2008 as part of a project to expand Downtown Dubai.

== Overview ==
The souk was developed by Emaar and a bridge connects it to the Dubai Mall, another Emaar property. It has both classic and contemporary architecture and is known for being a blend of each. It spans 3.5 km of restaurants and cafes along Sheikh Mohammad bin Rashid Boulevard.

The shopping center sells mainly luxury goods such as perfumes and jewelry, as well as having many 22 restaurants. There are over 100 shops, with products ranging from handcrafted goods to jewelry. The market is aimed towards tourists and is strategically next to the Dubai Fountain in order to use the large crowds to its advantage. The souk is also adjacent to the Address Downtown hotel, which is convenient to guests.

== Gallery ==
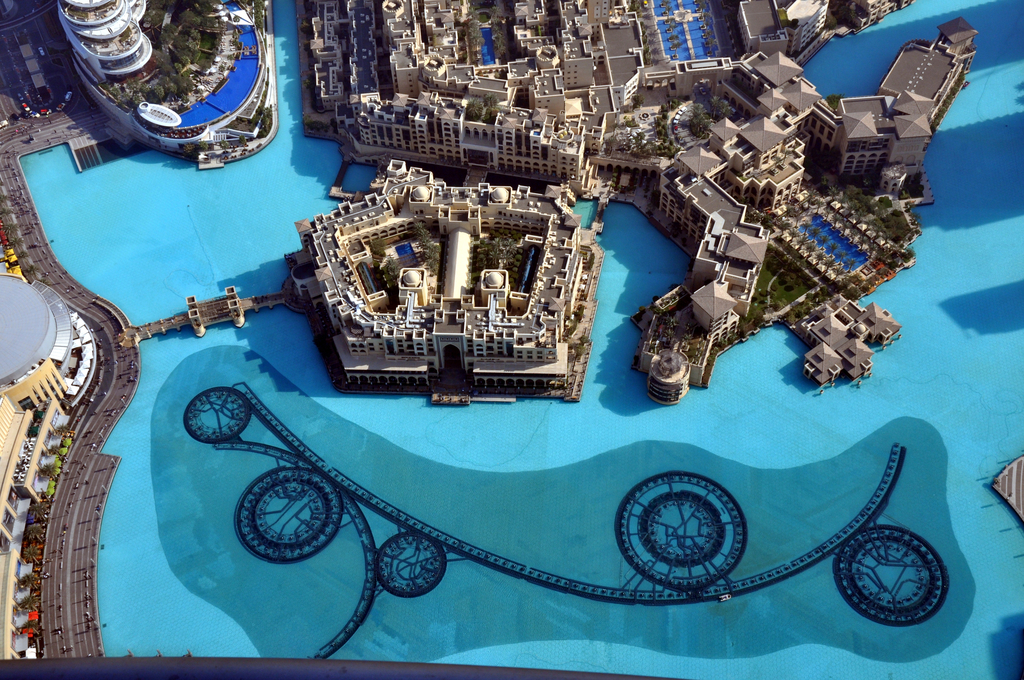
The souk viewed from the Burj Khalifa with the Dubai Fountain surrounding it

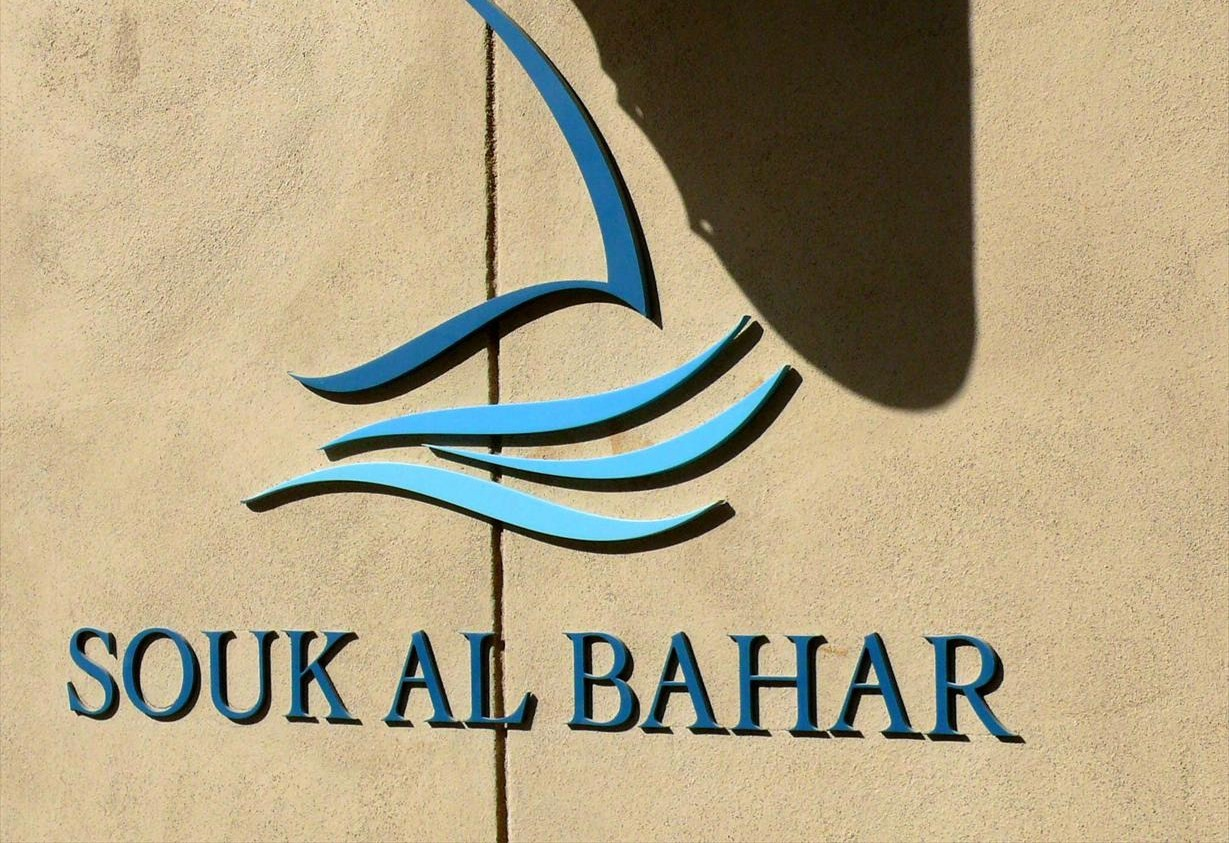
Logo

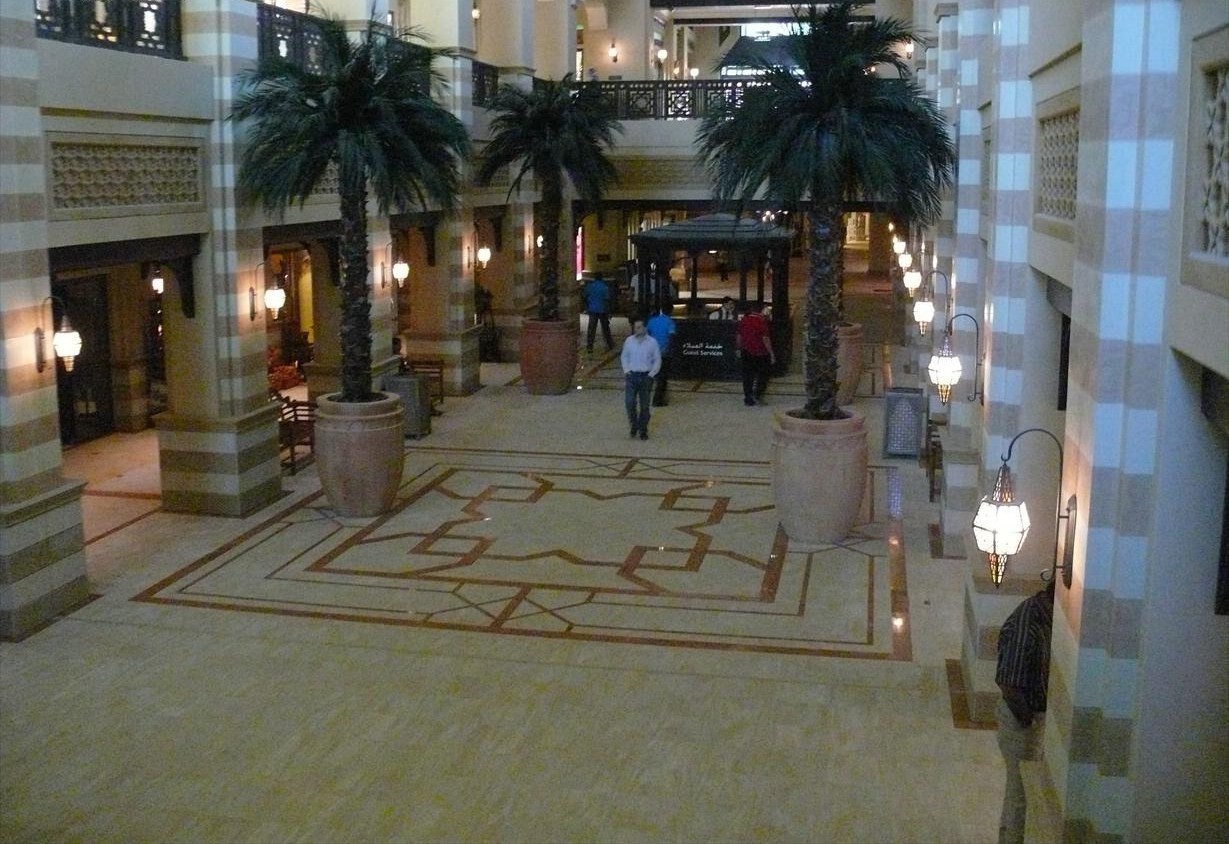
Interior lobby

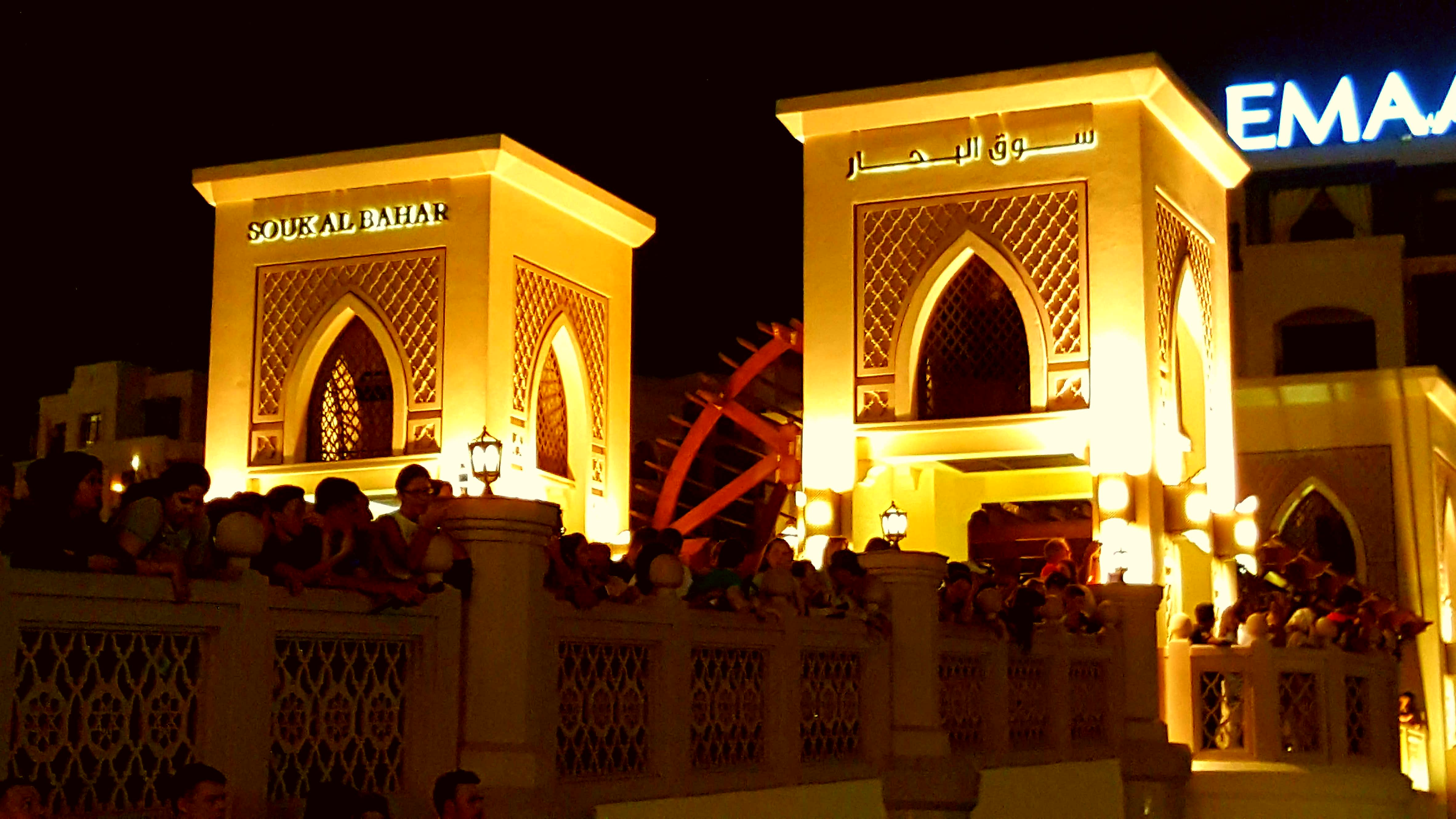
Front entrance

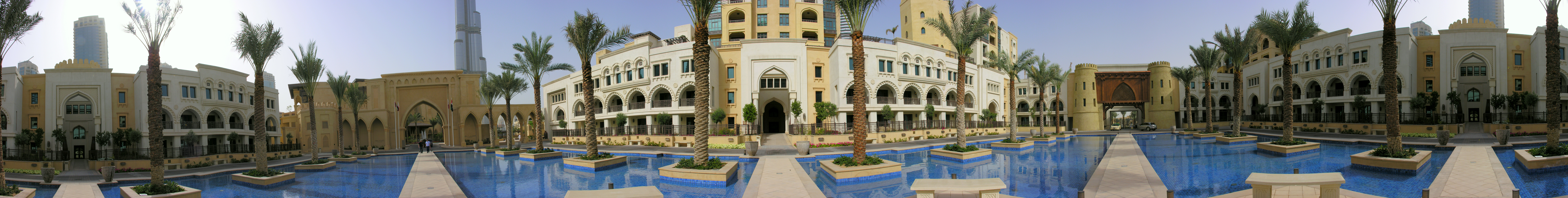
Panorama of walking path within the souk

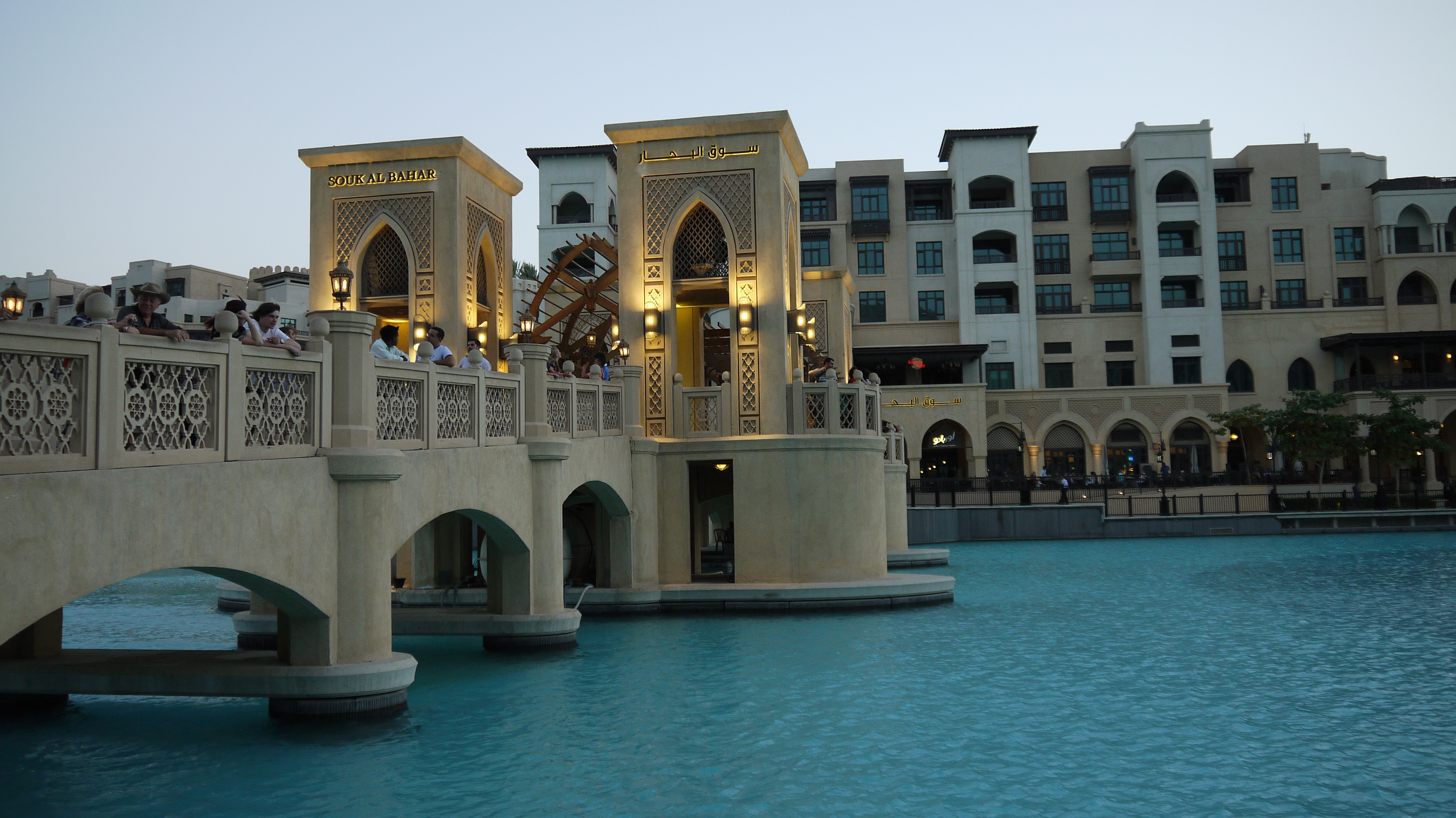
Bridge across the artificial Burj Lake connecting to the souk

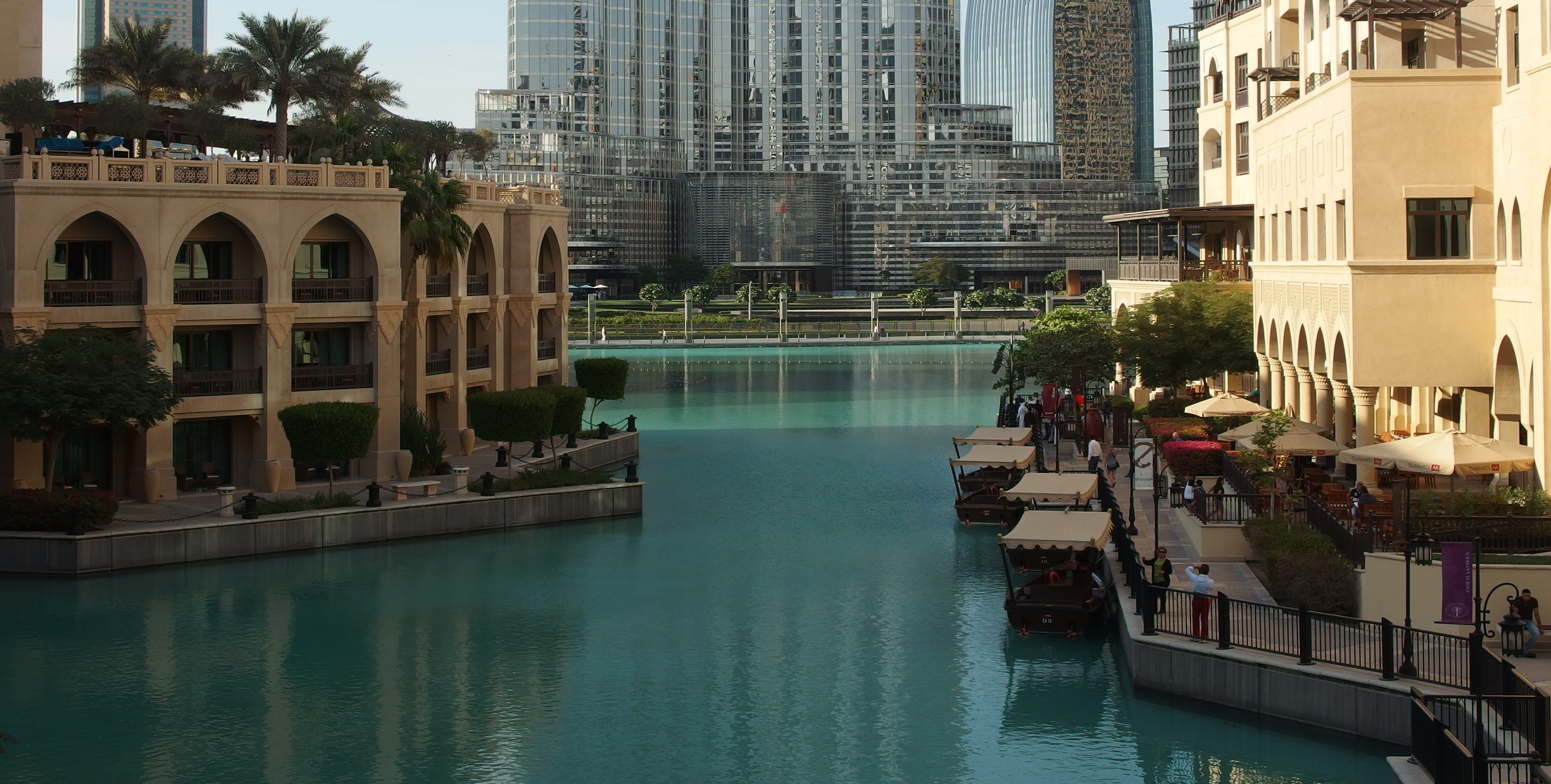
Edge of the market with the Burj Khalifa base visible

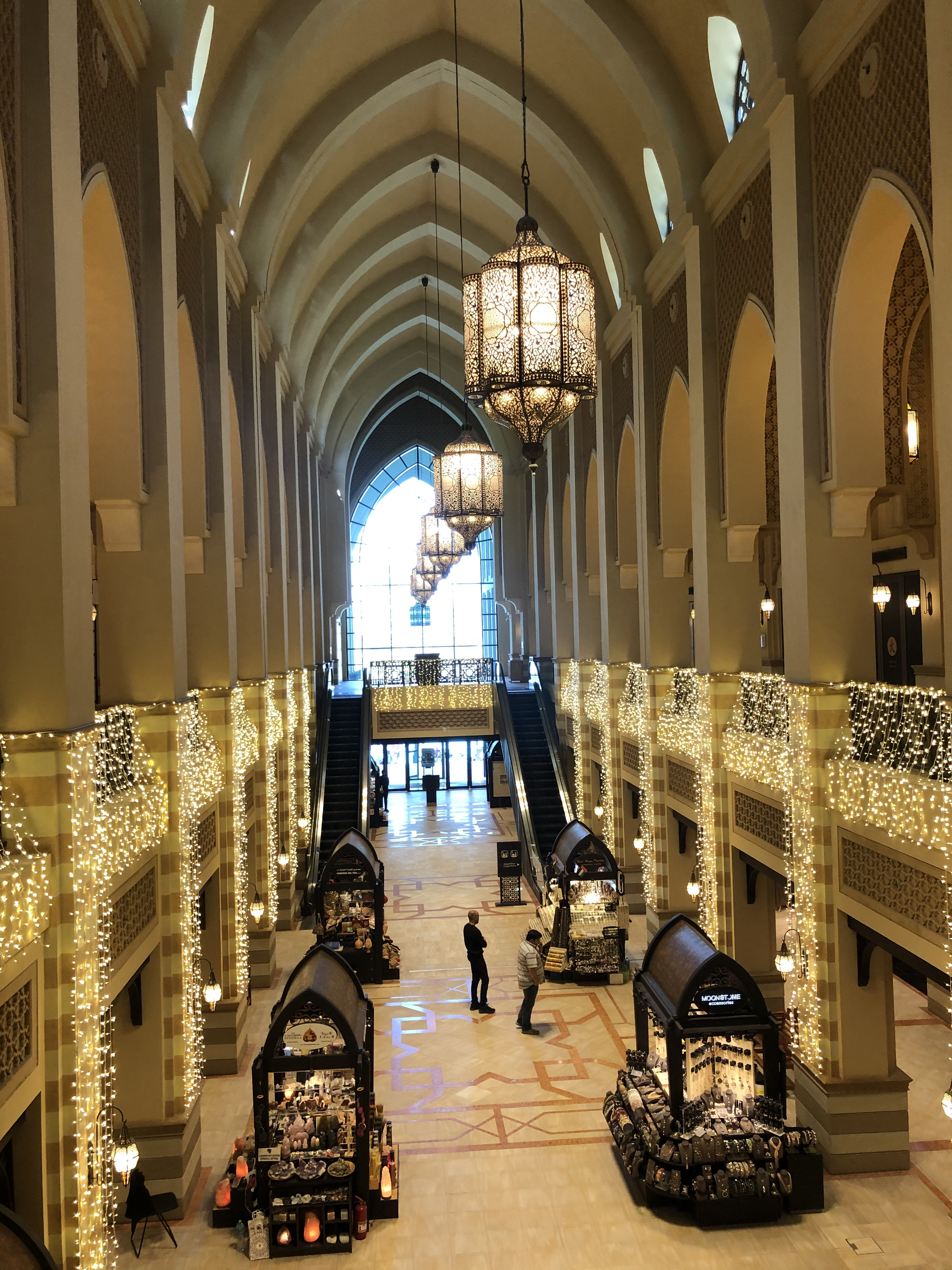
Open lobby area for shopping

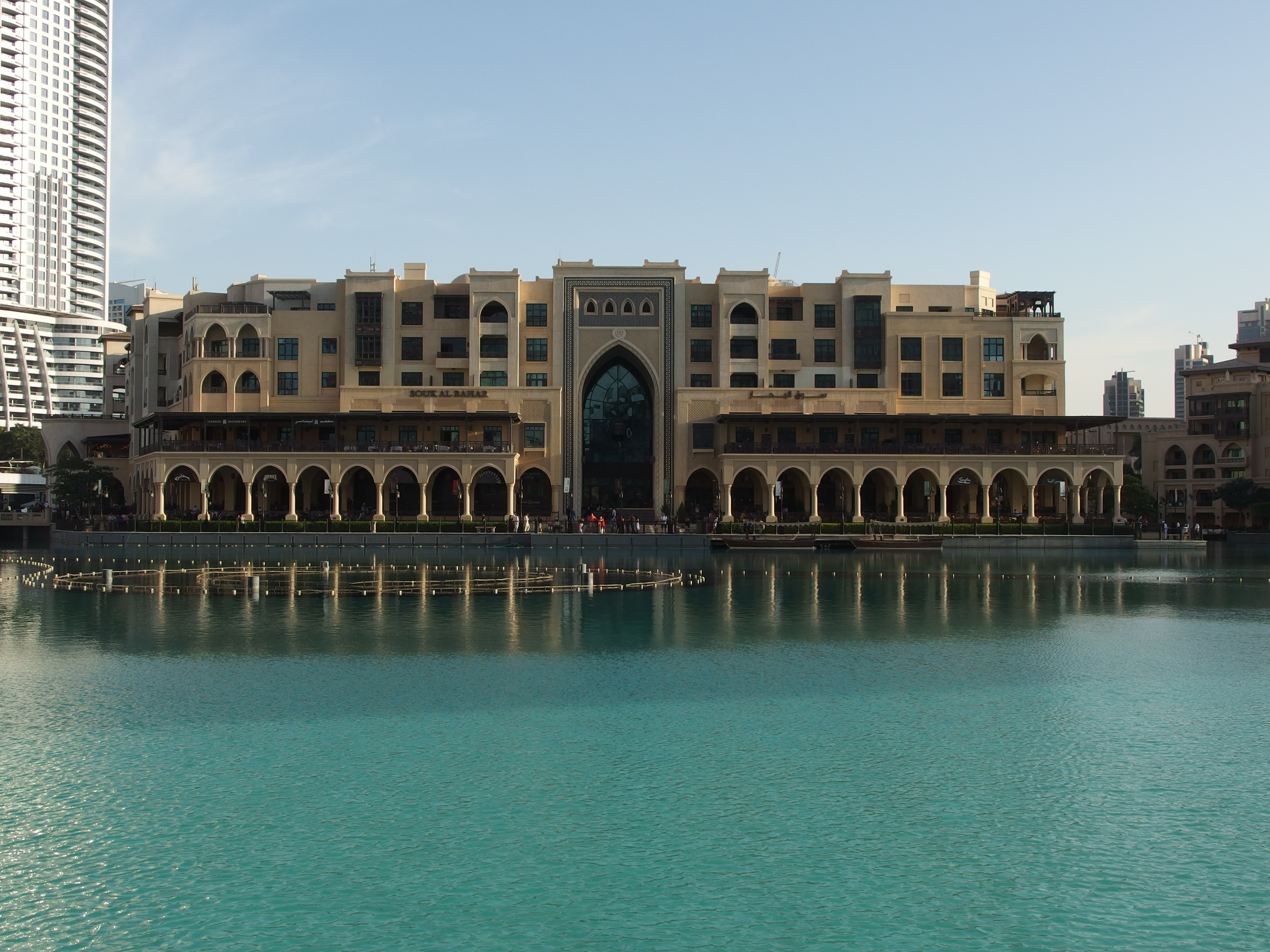
Front facade of the souk viewed from across the lake
