= Il Primo Dubai =

Skyscraper in Dubai, United Arab Emirates

Il Primo Tower
- Interactive map of the Il Primo Tower area

General information
- Status: Completed
- Type: Residential
- Location: Dubai, United Arab Emirates, Sheikh Mohammed bin Rashid Blvd, Opera District, Downtown Dubai
- Coordinates: 25.19637°N 55.27198°E
- Construction started: November 2017
- Topped-out: 2021
- Completed: January 2023
- Cost: $278.3 million

Height
- Roof: 356 m (1,168 ft)

Technical details
- Structural system: Concrete
- Floor count: 79 (+6 underground)
- Floor area: 99,754 m^{2} (1,070,000 sq ft)

Design and construction
- Architect: Kohn Pedersen Fox (KFP)
- Developer: Emaar Properties
- Structural engineer: WSP Middle East; Doka GmbH
- Main contractor: TAV Construction

Website
- Il Primo; Il Primo The Opera District

Il Primo Tower is a supertall residential skyscraper in Dubai, United Arab Emirates. Built between 2017 and 2023, the tower stands at 356 m (1,168 ft) tall with 79 floors, currently sharing the fifth spot on the list of the tallest buildings in Dubai with the Gevora Hotel.

== History ==
=== Architecture ===
The tower is located in the Downtown Opera District in the proximity of Burj Khalifa, the Dubai Mall and the Dubai Opera. The building topped out in 2021 by WSP Middle East, together with Emaar Development PJSC, features a 79-storey tower along with a podium and six levels of underground parking. The residential units are designed with vistas of famous city buildings and include various features and luxuries like marble flooring, soft lighting, and contemporary artwork.

== See also ==
- List of tallest buildings in Dubai
- List of tallest buildings in the United Arab Emirates
- List of tallest residential buildings
