= Emaar Developments =

UAE-based property development arm of Emaar Properties

- Type: Public
- Traded as: DFM: EMAARDEV
- Industry: Real estate
- Founded: 1997
- Headquarters: Dubai, United Arab Emirates
- Key people: Mohamed Alabbar, Founder; Bader Hareb, CEO
- Services: Commercial and residential property development
- Revenue: US$2.4 billion
- Number of employees: 400 approx.
- Parent: Emaar Properties
- Website: www.emaar.com

Emaar Developments is the UAE-based property development arm of Emaar Properties. The company develops residential and commercial property, shopping malls and other retail assets, as well as hospitality and leisure attractions.

Emaar Development was ranked 31st on Forbes Middle East's Top 100 Listed Companies 2025 list.

== Background ==
Emaar Development is headed by founder Mohammed Alabbar and CEO Chris O'Donnell. With the support of the parent company, Emaar Properties, Emaar Development has developed projects such as Emirates Living, Dubai Marina and Downtown Dubai.

Since 2002, Emaar Development has delivered over 34,500 residential units, and, according to JLL, approximately 22% of all freehold residential units in Dubai are located in Emaar Development's communities.

Emaar Development's projects typically contain residential units, such as apartments, townhouses or villas, that are built for sale ("BTS assets"); commercial units, including offices, retail space, educational and medical facilities which are built for leasing to occupiers by Emaar Properties or its subsidiaries ("BTL assets"); and recreational amenities such as parks or water features. Certain projects also contain hotels, polo and golf clubs, which are built for operation by Emaar Properties or its subsidiaries ("BTO assets").

== Notable projects ==
=== Downtown Dubai ===
Downtown Dubai is an urban, mixed-use development, incorporating the worlds tallest building, the Burj Khalifa, and the world's largest mall, The Dubai Mall.

Within Downtown Dubai, current developments include:

- Burj Vista
- The Address Sky View Tower I, & II
- Fountain Views I, II & III
- Address Boulevard
- Address Downtown
- Old Town Island
- The Address Residence Dubai Opera

==== Burj Khalifa ====
The Burj Khalifa is the world's tallest building, with a total height of 829.8 metres (2,722 ft) and a roof height (excluding antenna) of 828 m (2,717 ft). Construction began in 2004 and the building was opened in 2010. The total construction cost is estimated to be US$1.5 billion.

The building was opened in 2010 as part of a new development called Downtown Dubai. It was designed to be the centrepiece of large-scale, mixed-use development. Originally named Burj Dubai, it was later renamed in honour of the ruler of Abu Dhabi and president of the United Arab Emirates, Khalifa bin Zayed Al Nahyan.

==== Dubai Mall ====
Opened on 4 November 2008, Dubai Mall the world's largest shopping centre by total area covered, and is the 29th largest shopping mall in the world by grossable area.

It contains over 1,200 stores and in 2011, was the world's most visited building, attracting over 54 million visitors each year.

At over 13 million square feet, the Dubai Mall has a total internal floor area of 5.9 million square feet (55 ha) and leasable space of 3.77 million square feet (35 ha). Dubai Mall includes:

=== Dubai Marina ===
Launched in 2003, Dubai Marina is an urban development constructed around a series of artificial canals. It spans a 3 km stretch of waterfront and is home to a number of residential, commercial, and leisure properties, including the Jumeirah Beach Residence, Dubai Marina Mall, and the Al Sahab Towers.

To create the man-made marina, the developers brought the waters of the Persian Gulf into the site of Dubai marina, creating a new waterfront. Upon completion, it is claimed to be the world's largest man-made marina.

== Emaar South ==
Emaar South is a top-designed commercial and residential community by Emaar Properties. It has apartments, villas, and townhouses. The community contains and an 18-hole championship golf course located near Sheikh Mohammed bin Zayed Road (E311) and Emirates Bypass Road (E611).

== Current developments ==
=== Arabian Ranches ===
Construction of the 1,650-acre Arabian Ranches private residential development began in 2012. It consists of a number of individual communities, each with their own architectural style. The project also encompasses commercial and leisure facilities, including an 18-hole Golf Course and Dubai Equestrian & Polo Club. It is scheduled for completion in 2019 and, once finished, will contain over 4,000 villas.

Arabian Ranches is a wholly owned project under development, and as of 30 September 2017, 99% of the residential units in the development had been sold.

=== Dubai Creek Harbour ===
Emaar Development has a joint development agreement for Dubai Creek Harbour with 50% of the economic benefits.

It consists of 9 distinct districts and contains the site for the flagship Dubai Creek Tower, this 1,480-acre mixed-use development was announced in 2013. Upon completion, it will be home to residential, commercial, and leisure facilities.

The Dubai Creek Tower is scheduled to surpass the Burj Khalifa as the world's tallest building. It has been designed by architect Santiago Calatrava.

=== Dubai Hills Estate ===
Announced in 2013, this mixed-use development is the first stage in the construction of Mohammed bin Rashid City (MBR City). It will be a 'city within a city' that will spread over an area of 2,700 acres and will be home to several residential neighbourhoods, leisure facilities, and commercial properties – including the Dubai Hills Mall. Two Metro lines and three stations will serve the development when completed. Some of the development – predominately residential units – have already launched, and are set around an 18-hole Championship golf course.

Dubai Hills Estate is a consolidated joint venture with Meraas Estates LLC. A total of 5,279 total units are under development.

The development will include:

- The Hills View and Hills Grove
- Acacia Park Heights
- Mulberry at Mark Heights
- Maple I, II and III

=== Emaar Beachfront ===
Emaar Beachfront is a master-planned gated community in Dubai, UAE. The project was announced in September 2017 and its initial offering of residential units sold out immediately. One of the development's key features is access to two beaches which, when combined, total 1.5 km of waterfront access. As of November 2018, a total of three residential projects have been launched at Emaar Beachfront. The first project to be launched was Beach Vista followed by Sunrise Bay and Marina Vista.

At least four alleged Aussie Cartel members, a group of Australian criminals, own apartments in the Sunrise Bay Tower 1 of Emaar Beachfront.

=== Emaar South ===
Emaar South is one of the principal components in Emaar Development's Dubai South project. Emaar South was announced in August 2016 and, upon completion, will encompass 22,700 residential units, leisure facilities, public amenities, and commercial properties, spread over a 6,700,000m² site.

Emaar South is a joint venture project with DACC (Dubai Aviation City Corporation), owned in equal shares.

== Other projects ==
- Seascape By Emaar
- Zabeel Square
- Al Marjan
- Emirates Living
