= Kempinski The Boulevard Dubai =

73-storey 370 m (1,214 ft) hotel in Downtown Dubai in Dubai, United Arab Emirates

- Viewed from the Burj Khalifa in 2017.
- Interactive map of the Kempinski The Boulevard Dubai area
- Alternative names: Kempinski The Boulevard, The Address Boulevard Hotel, The Address The BLVD, The Address Boulevard Dubai, Address Boulevard
- Hotel chain: Kempinski Hotels

General information
- Type: Residential; Hotel; Retail
- Architectural style: Postmodern architecture
- Location: Downtown Dubai, Dubai, UAE
- Coordinates: 25.2009004°N 55.2761412°E
- Construction started: September 2012
- Completed: 2017
- Opened: 2017; 9 years ago
- Owner: Abu Dhabi National Hotels

Height
- Architectural: 370 m (1,214 ft)
- Tip: 370 m (1,214 ft)
- Top floor: 275 m (902 ft)

Technical details
- Material: Concrete; Glass
- Floor count: 73

Design and construction
- Architects: Atkins (concept); NORR Group Consultants International Ltd. (schematic, detailed design & record)
- Developer: Emaar Properties
- Main contractor: Brookfield Multiplex

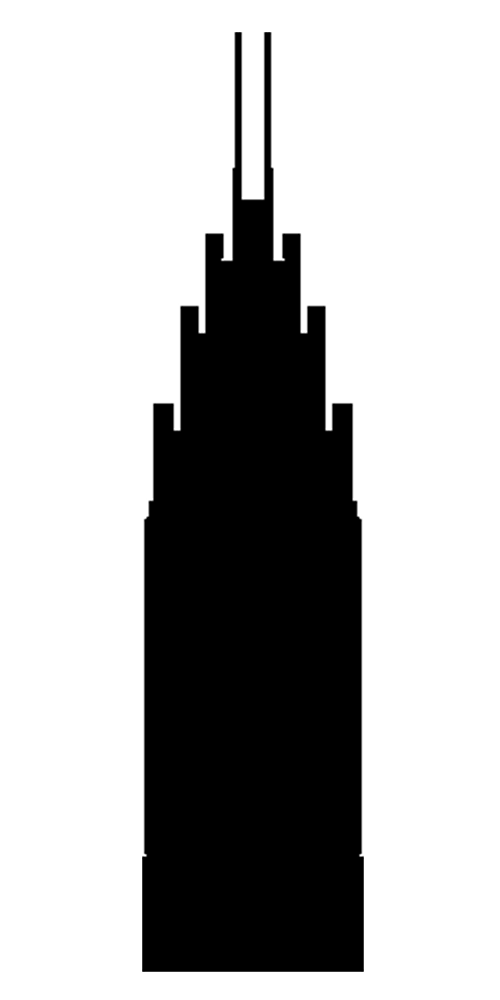
Kempinski The Boulevard Dubai shape.

Kempinski The Boulevard Dubai, previously known as The Address Boulevard, is a 73-storey 370 m (1,214 ft) hotel in Downtown Dubai in Dubai, United Arab Emirates. It has 198 five-star hotel rooms and suites. It is on the list of tallest buildings in Dubai and the list of tallest buildings in the world. It has a restaurant, 3 pools, and views of the Burj Khalifa.

The hotel permanently displays 251 specially-commissioned original artworks by 48 internationally renowned artists.

The hotel was previously part of the Address Hotels & Resorts, a hotel chain owned by the Emirati real estate company Emaar.

== History ==
The project was developed by Emaar Properties in 2012. The serviced residences sold out on the day of the launch of sales in September 2012. The hotel opened in 2017.

In 2018, Emaar sold its hotels in Dubai, including Address Boulevard, to Abu Dhabi National Hotels for $598 million.

In 2024, Abu Dhabi National Hotels announced that the Address Boulevard would be rebranded to Kempinski The Boulevard Dubai, thereby ending Emaar's management of the hotel. Some interior fit-out elements of the hotel were completed by Rayfitout.

== See also ==
- List of tallest buildings in Dubai
- List of tallest buildings in the United Arab Emirates
