= Crescent Bay, Karachi =

Crescent Bay
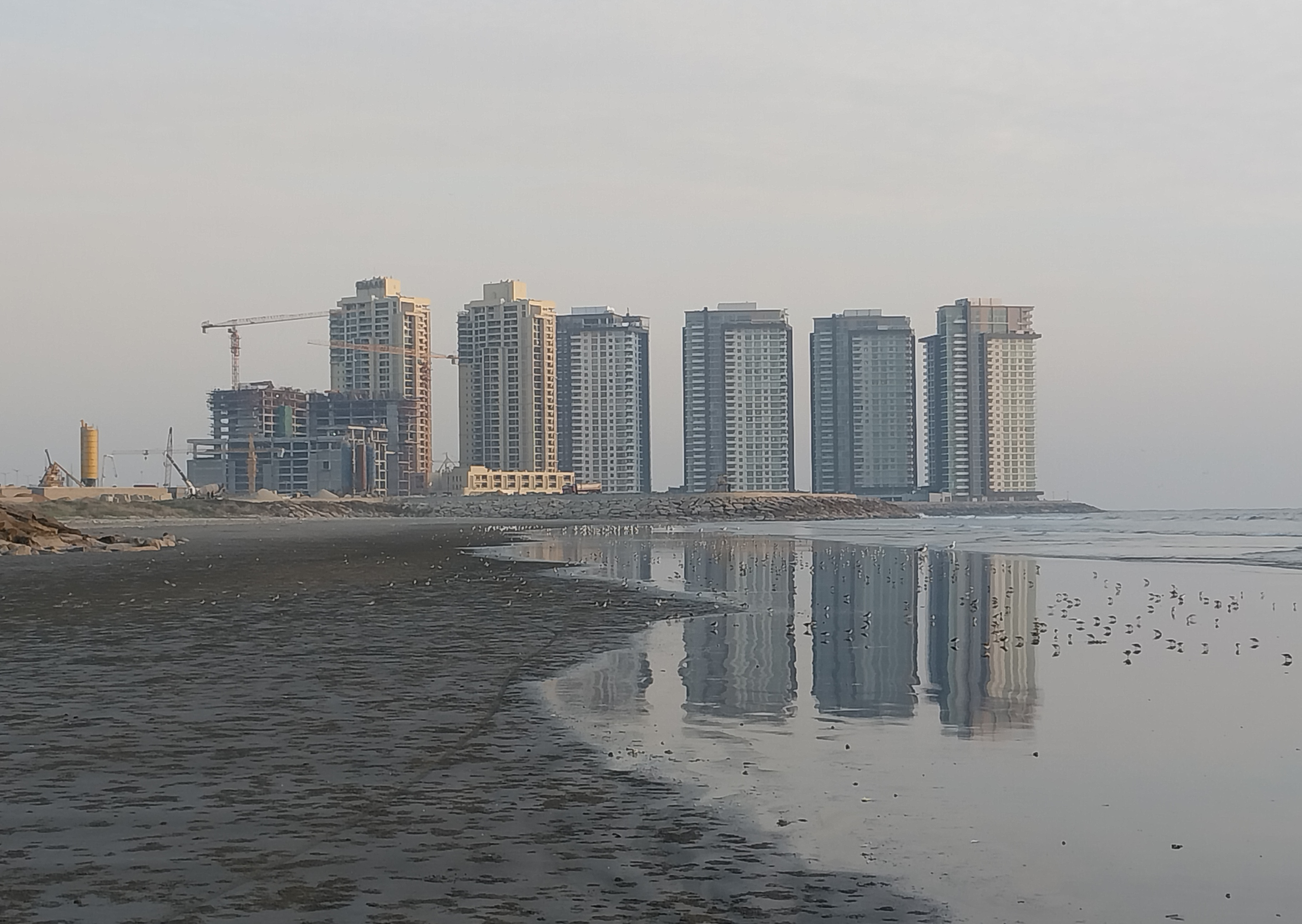
- Crescent Bay as of 2022

General information
- Status: Under construction
- Type: Residential; Commercial; Retail
- Location: Karachi, Pakistan
- Construction started: 2006
- Estimated completion: 2050
- Cost: $2.4 billion
- Operator: Hill International

Design and construction
- Developer: Emaar Properties Giga Group of Companies

References
- Emaar Pakistan - Official website Giga Group of Companies - Official website

Crescent Bay is a 440,000-square-metre (108-acre) under-construction upscale mixed-use oceanfront development in Defence, Karachi, Pakistan, consisting of 50 towers. It is a joint venture by EMAAR and Giga Group. Land reclamation on the project was completed by Mazyood Giga International, a subsidiary of Giga Group, with the help of Halcrow Consultants.

The development features 50 high and mid-rise towers for residential and commercial use, a shopping centre, a five-star beachfront hotel, and a tower located in the middle of the project. The development includes approximately 4,000 residential apartments. Begun on May 31, 2006, when completed, the development would be the first development with a private beach and also the first based on reclaimed land.

Even though the development sold out in 2008, it faced significant delays, initially due to the liquidity crisis faced by Emaar Properties following the 2008 financial crisis, and later, due to a legal battle with DHA Ltd, allegedly for breach of contract. The construction resumed in 2015 and was contracted to NESPAK.

As of 2022, the 38-storey Coral Tower (2 towers), Pearl Tower (3 towers), and Reef Tower (2 Towers) are complete. As of 2022, Residential properties are priced from $300,000 to $600,000.

== See also ==
- Defence Housing Authority
- Emaar Pakistan
