= Downtown Erbil =

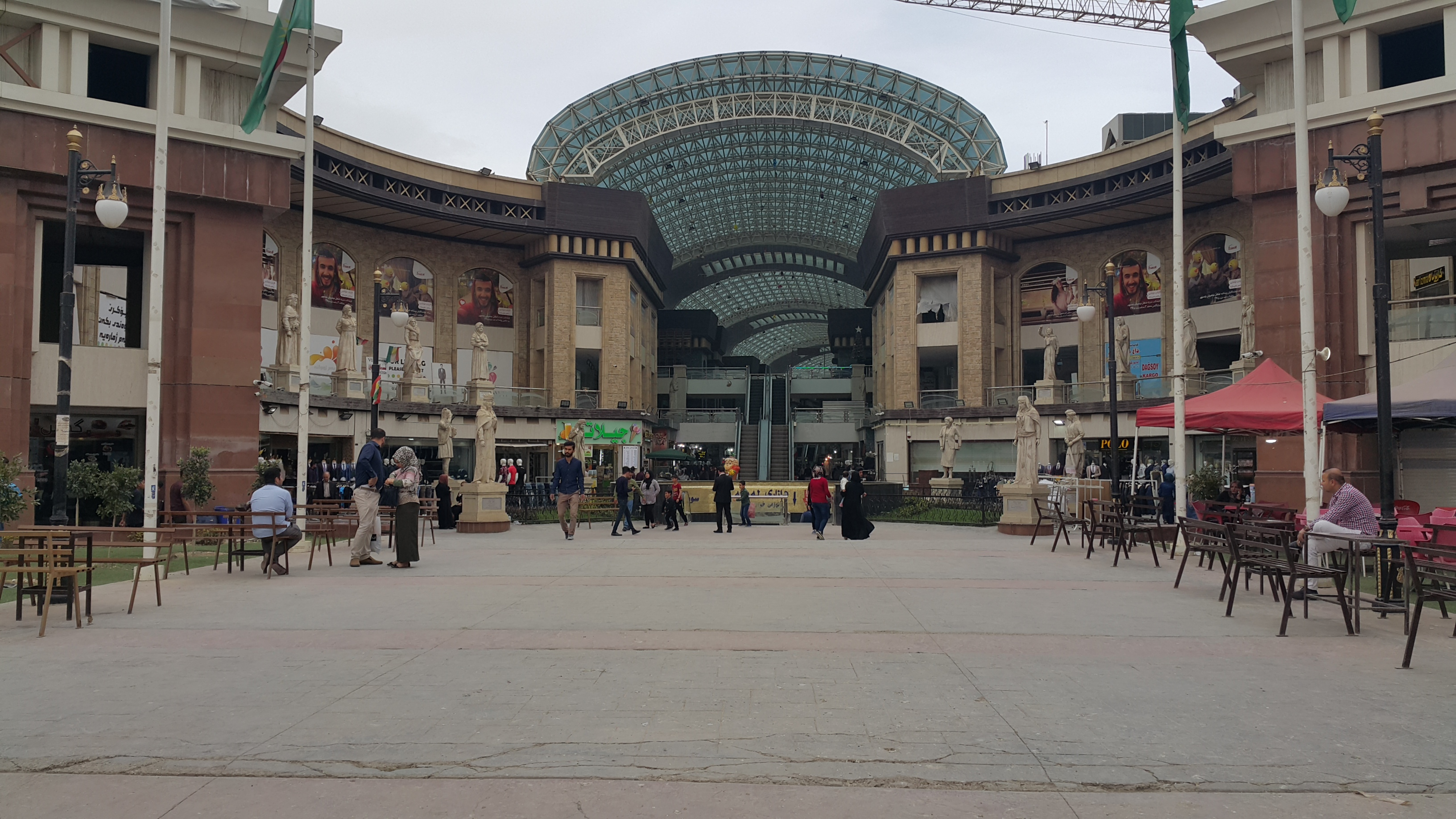
- Downtown Erbil Entrance

Project
- Construction started: 2013
- Construction cost: US$3 billion
- Status: Completed
- Developer: Emaar
- Architect: Emaar

Location
- Interactive map of Downtown Erbil
- Address: Qalaa Street, Erbil, Iraqi Kurdistan

Downtown Erbil (Kurdish: داون تاونی ھەولێر) is a mixed-use project featuring twin towers, residential and commercial space, hotels, malls and parks covering 541,000 square metres, located in Erbil, Iraqi Kurdistan. The $3 billion project was launched in 2013 by Emaar.

== Gallery ==
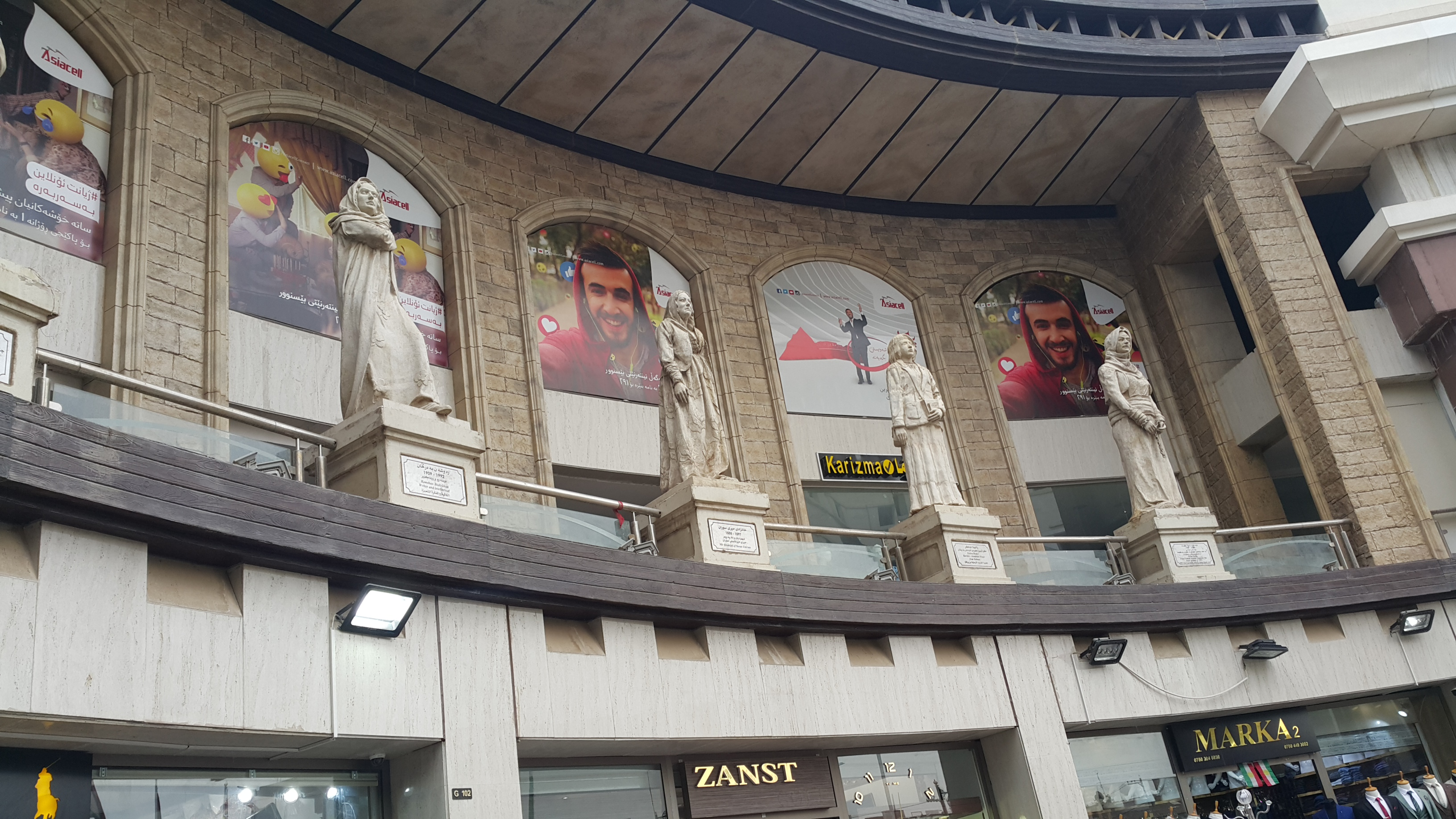
Some of the Kurdish famous women's statue inside the Down Town.

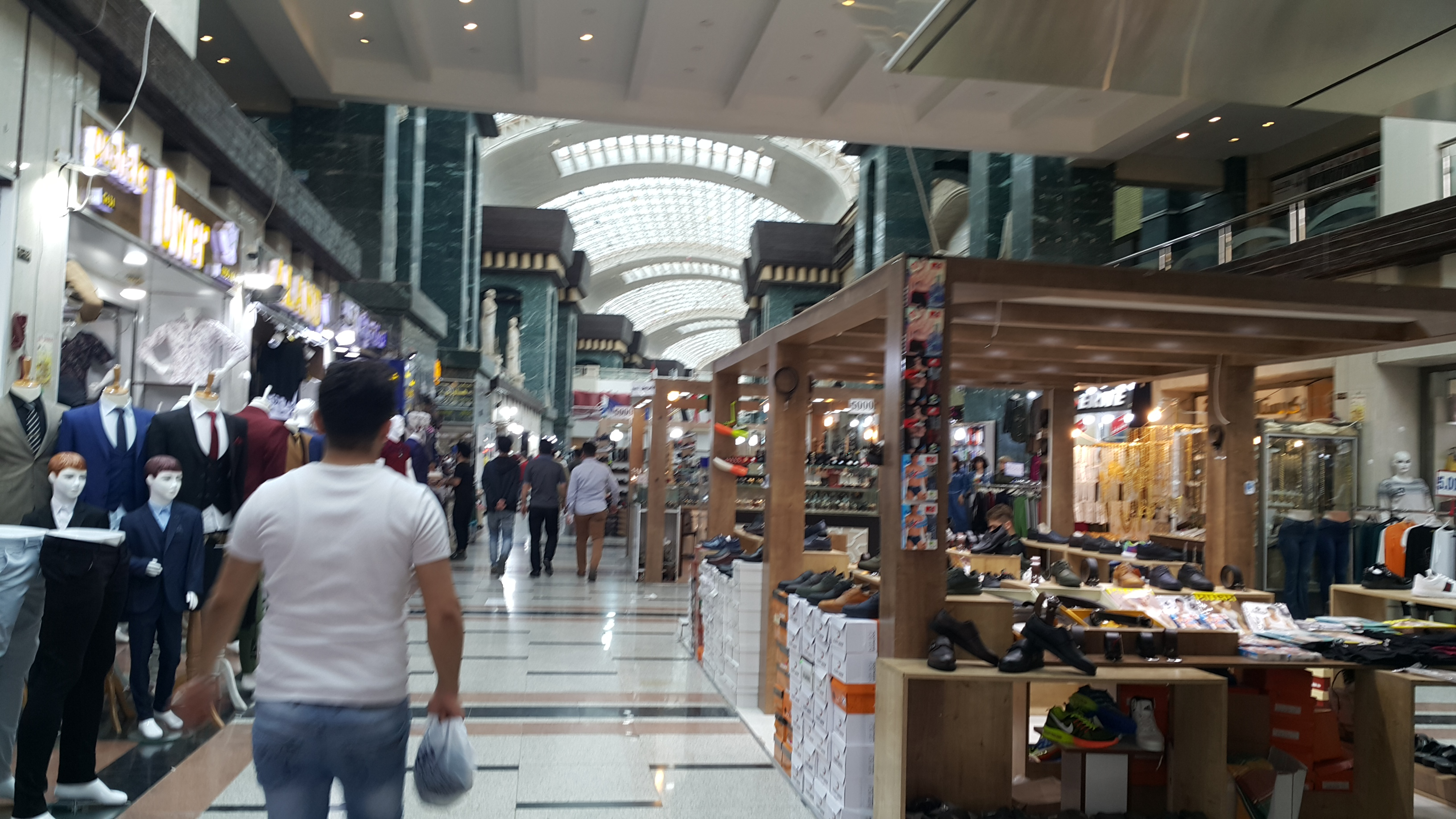
Inside View of the Down Town.
