= Address Downtown =

Hotel tower in Dubai, United Arab Emirates

- فندق العنوان داون تاون
- The Address as seen across The Dubai Fountain

- Location within Dubai

General information
- Status: Open
- Type: Hotel; Residential
- Architectural style: Art Deco
- Location: Dubai, United Arab Emirates
- Coordinates: 25.1936°N 55.2768°E
- Construction started: 10 October 2005
- Completed: 23 September 2008
- Opened: October 2, 2008
- Cost: AED845 million

Height
- Architectural: 306.2 m (1,005 ft)
- Top floor: 228.3 m (749 ft)

Technical details
- Floor count: 63
- Floor area: 178,000 m^{2} (1,920,000 sq ft)

Design and construction
- Developer: Emaar Properties
- Structural engineer: Atkins
- Main contractor: Besix; Arab Technical Construction

Other information
- Number of rooms: 626 rooms 196 units

Website
- addresshotels.com/en/hotels/address-downtown/

The Address Downtown, (Arabic: فندق العنوان داون تاون) formerly The Address Downtown Dubai, is a 63-story, 302.2 m (991 ft) supertall hotel and residential skyscraper in the Downtown Dubai Area of Dubai, United Arab Emirates. It was built by Emaar Properties.

== Overview ==
The tower is the twenty-second tallest building in Dubai. It is a tall structure within the massive development named Downtown Dubai, which includes the centerpiece super-tall building, the Burj Khalifa. The tower was topped out in April 2008, and was then the sixth tallest building in Dubai. The AED845 million tower was completed in September 2008.

The five-star hotel and residential complex features 196 rooms and 626 serviced apartments. It is located near the Burj Khalifa and The Dubai Fountain.

== 2015 fire ==
Around 21:00 GST on 31 December 2015, a fire broke out on the 20th floor of the building. The floor where the fire is thought to have begun hosts residential suites. The nearby Dubai Mall was also evacuated as a precaution.

Dubai's Media Office said the fire began on a 20th-floor terrace. Explosions of unknown origin were heard as the fire spread to other parts of the building. Then, debris fell from the building and dark plumes of smoke were seen emanating from the skyscraper. Commenting on the speed with which the fire spread, Jonathan Gilliam, a CNN law-enforcement analyst, said, "This is looking absolutely horrific. This is spreading very rapidly."

A representative of Dubai Civil Defence said four separate teams of firefighters had fought the blaze. Once the fire was contained, the plan was to ensure that the fire did not spread by implementing cooling procedures, and to search for any stranded individuals, according to Dubai Police Chief, Major-General Khamis Mattar Al Mazeina.

According to the Dubai Media Office, 14 people were slightly injured and one was moderately injured. One person had a heart attack during the evacuation.

Photographer Dennis Mallari was setting up to photograph the Dubai fireworks when he became trapped on a balcony on the 48th floor of the hotel, 10 meters away from the blaze. He sent text messages alerting the authorities to his emergency, sought help by Facebook posts, and filmed the encroaching fire, eventually tying a rope around himself to a nearby window-cleaning platform and hanging off a balcony before being rescued.

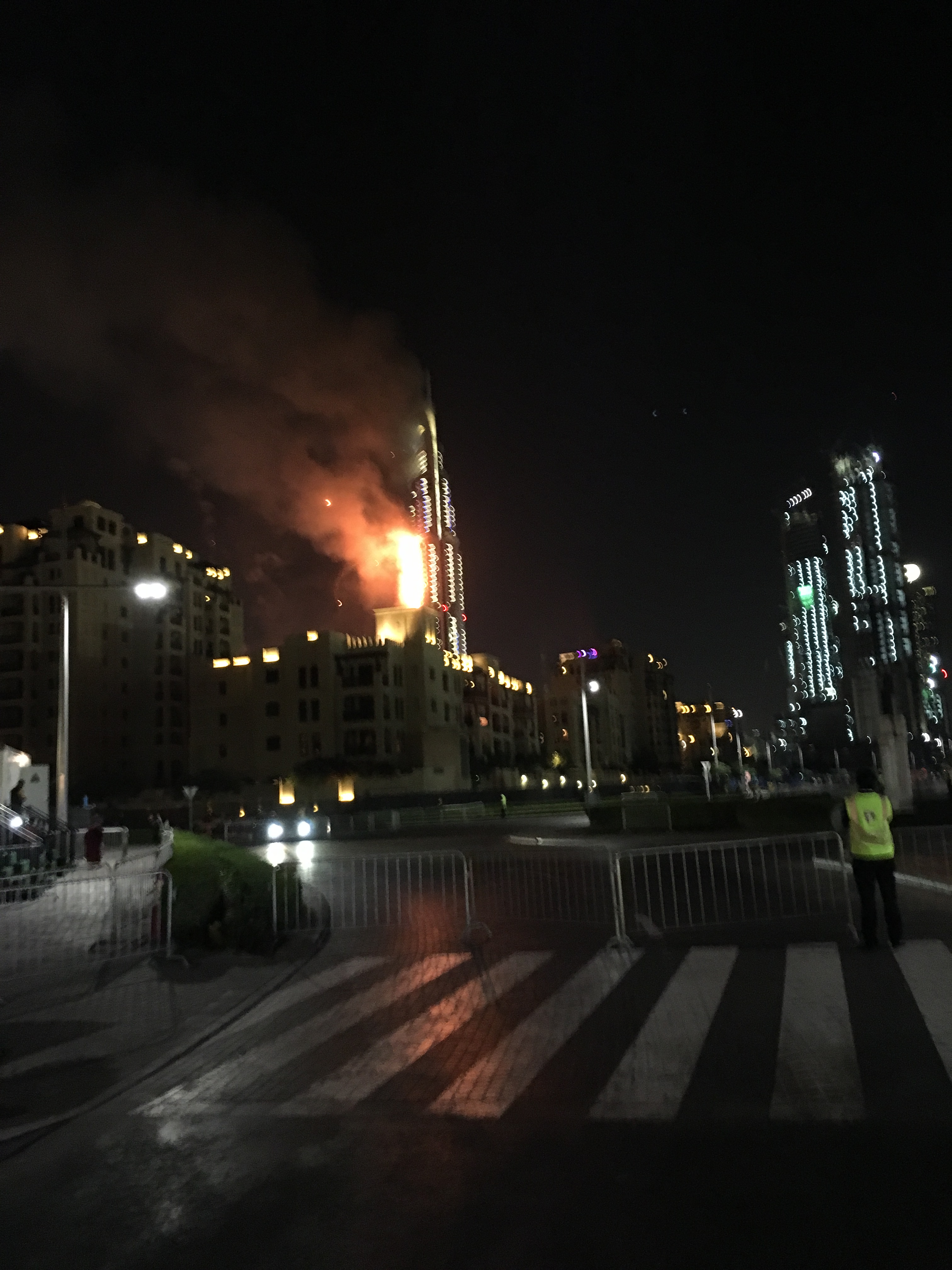
The Address hotel on fire

Those who sustained smoke inhalation and minor injuries were treated by 20 doctors and 50 nurses from the Dubai Health Authority at the site, according to Al Mazeina. Director-General of Dubai Civil Defence, Major General Rashid Thani Rashid Al Matroushi, said that all of the hotel residents were evacuated, none of the injured were children, and that fire "broke out only in the external interface and the majority of the fire did not make it to the inside." (Note: The Times of India reported that during 2015: "In November, a massive blaze engulfed three residential blocs in central Dubai and led to services on a metro line being suspended, although no one was hurt. In February, a huge fire gutted one of the emirate's tallest buildings, destroying luxury flats in the Torch tower and triggering an evacuation of nearby blocs in the Dubai Marina neighbourhood -- a district popular among expatriates.") Several people at the site complained that neither the fire alarm nor the sprinkler system activated during the fire.

It was reported that the hotel was probably packed with guests due to its clear view of the New Year's fireworks display at the Burj Khalifa, which is actually located right in front of the hotel. The show still went on as planned, but with some flaws in the LED programming; by midnight, authorities had deemed the fire to be 90 percent contained. The following day, smoke continued to rise from the building. Criticism was leveled regarding the high amount of cladding—layers of material that are fixed to the outside of buildings for insulation—implemented into the building's design; this cladding may have contributed to the fire's spread.

On 20 January 2016, Dubai Police confirmed that the fire was caused by an electrical short circuit. The forensic investigation identified that the short circuit was caused by electrical wires of the spotlight used to illuminate the building between the 14th and the 15th floor. After an onsite investigation, experts concluded that the fire broke out in the duct between flat numbers 1401 and 1504. Further investigation in flat number 1504 indicated that the fire spread to that unit from the side of the window, which is connected to the ledge; falling debris caused the fire in flat number 1401. Police released photographs showing the exposed unconnected wire in the duct between the two apartments. The fire was first reported by a guest who was residing on the 18th floor of the building; he called the reception to inform that he could smell something burning and visited the reception minutes later after he began to notice the smoke.

Address Downtown after reconstruction

Emaar provided housing for those whose apartments were affected by the fire, but some residents complained that the housing was inferior to that they had lost. Hotel guests are still waiting to be compensated for the lost items and trauma suffered as a result of the fire. They cannot obtain a precise update from the hotel group nearly two years after the fire.

In late 2016, renovation on the tower had started, and while the re-construction was going on, another building under construction within Downtown Dubai, caught fire. That fire was extinguished but smoke plumed across Downtown Dubai. Re-construction, installation of safety features and renovation of the Address Downtown Hotel had been completed in 2018. Before the incident, the building was used to launch fireworks synchronized with the fireworks from the Burj Khalifa. As of 2018, these had been discontinued.

== See also ==
- List of buildings in Dubai
- List of tallest buildings in Dubai
- List of tallest buildings in the United Arab Emirates
