= Downtown Dubai =

Community in United Arab Emirates

Downtown Dubai وسط مدينة دبي The Centre of Now
- Community
- Downtown Dubai
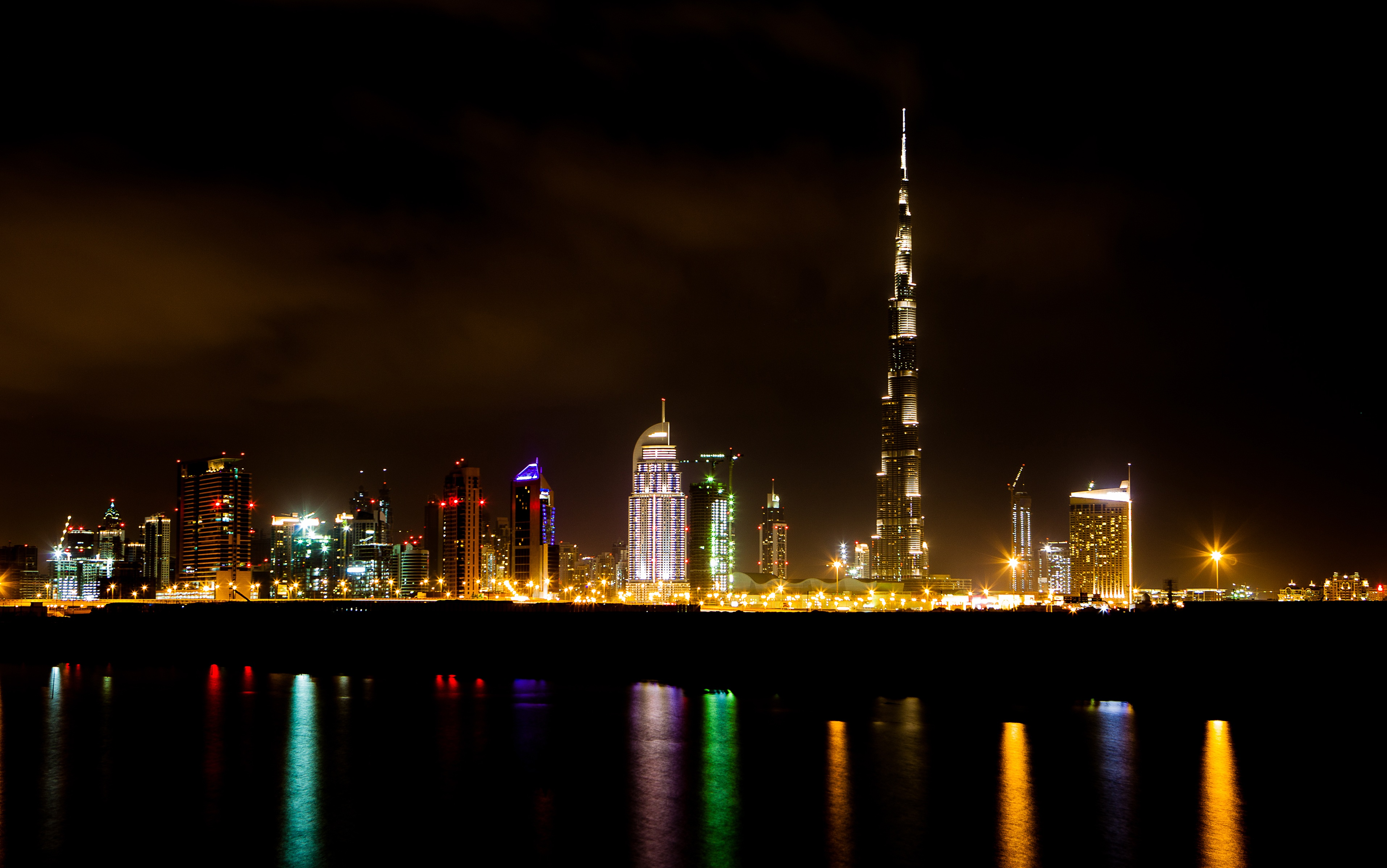
- Downtown Dubai in 2011
- Interactive map of Downtown Dubai
- Coordinates: 25.18366°N 55.26664°E
- Country: United Arab Emirates
- Emirate: Emirate of Dubai
- City: Dubai
- The New Dubai: June 21, 2000

Area
  - Total: 2 km^{2} (0.77 sq mi)

Population
  - Total: 100,000 +
  - Density: 50,000/km^{2} (130,000/sq mi)

Downtown Dubai or The Dubai Downtown is a large-scale, mixed-use complex in Dubai, United Arab Emirates. It was developed by the Emaar real estate development company. Before 2000, this area was called Umm Al Tarif. It is home to some of the city's most notable landmarks, including Burj Khalifa, the world's tallest building; the Dubai Mall, the second-largest mall in the world and The Dubai Fountain, the world's largest choreographed fountain. It covers an area of 2 square kilometres (0.77 sq mi), at an estimated cost of US$20 billion (Dh73 billion) upon completion and, as of 2017, has a population of 13,201.

The development is situated along Sheikh Zayed Road, across from Al Wasl locality on the northwest. It is bounded to the south by Business Bay and to the northeast by Financial Centre Road, which separates it from Zabeel and Trade Centre 2. At the heart of Downtown Dubai will be Emaar's famous development, the Burj Khalifa and the Dubai Mall, characterised by entertainment, shopping and dining.

Arabic low-rise vernacular style of architecture is present in the Old Town, while high-rise contemporary buildings dominate the rest of the development. Downtown Dubai includes a range of high-end hotels such as Address Downtown, Vida Downtown, and Al Manzil Downtown, as well as attractions such as the Souk Al Bahar luxury Arabian market and a 3.5 km-long strip of restaurants and cafes on Sheikh Mohammad bin Rashid Boulevard. Souk Al Bahar has over 100 shops and over 20 restaurants, cafes, and lounges adjacent to the Dubai Fountains.

== Landmarks ==
=== Burj Khalifa ===
Burj Khalifa

Burj Khalifa is the centrepiece of Downtown Dubai. At 828 m (2,717 ft), it is the tallest building in the world and the tallest human-made structure ever built. Construction began on 21 September 2004, and was completed and ready for occupancy by 4 January 2010. Burj Khalifa is estimated to have cost US$1.5 billion. In addition to being the tallest building in the world, Burj Khalifa holds six other world records, including 'tallest free-standing structure in the world', 'elevator with the longest running distance in the world' and 'highest number of storey's in the world.' It also houses the Armani Hotel Dubai, which spans 30 floors of the building.

=== The Dubai Mall ===
Aerial view of Dubai Mall and Address Dubai Mall

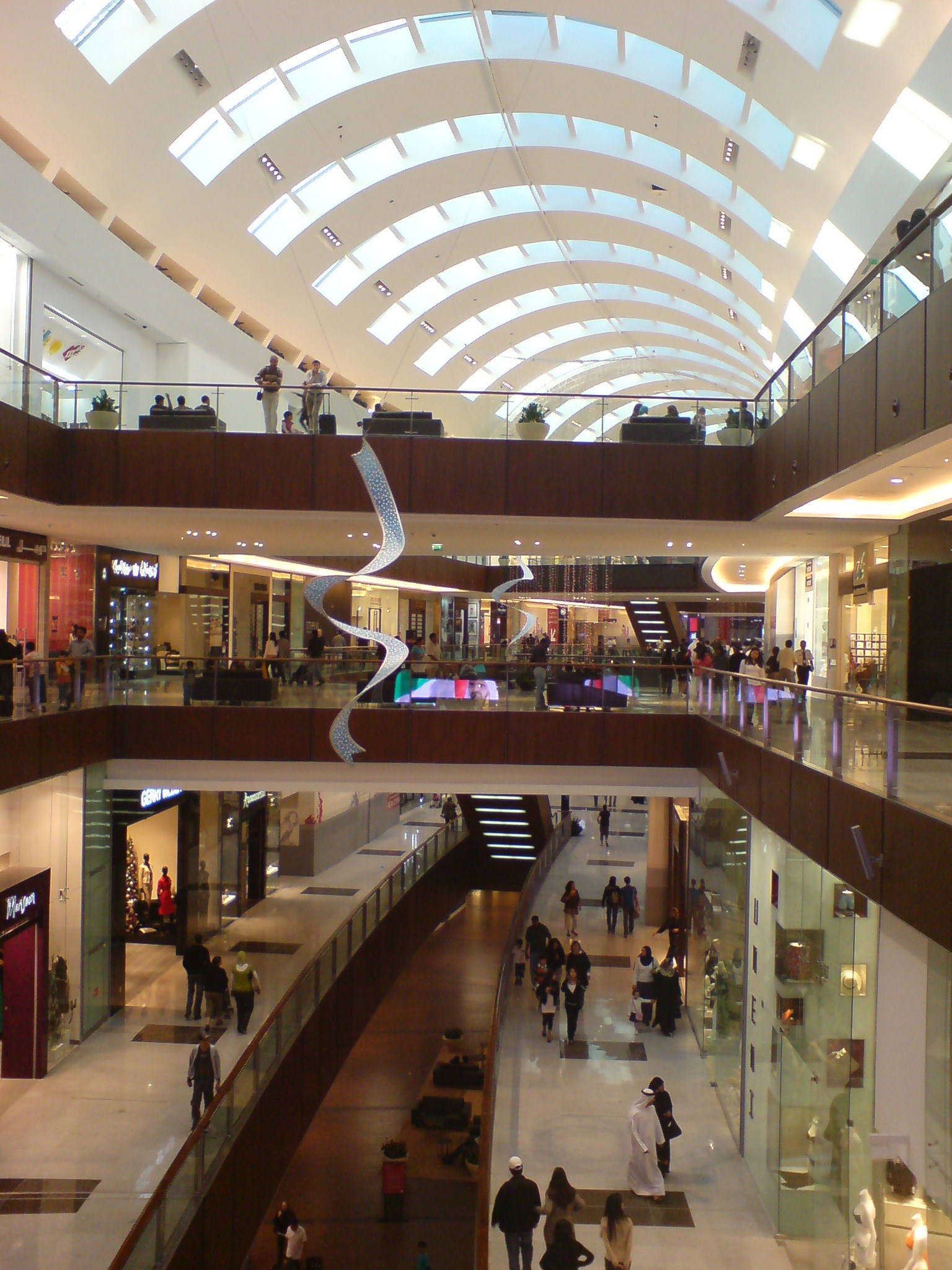
Dubai Mall's interior

The Dubai Mall is the world's second largest shopping mall by total area. It is the home of 1,300 stores in addition to numerous attractions, including an Olympic-size ice rink, an aquarium and a water zoo. In March 2018, the owner of The Dubai Mall, Emaar Properties, opened an entertainment complex called VR Park, which blends augmented reality and virtual reality (VR). Access to the mall is provided via Doha Street, rebuilt as a double-decker road in April 2009. The Dubai Mall opened on November 4, 2008, with more than 1,200 retailers. The Dubai Mall is the most visited retail destination in the United Arab Emirates with approximately over 100 Million visitors every year. The mall has gone through various expansions and in 2024, Emaar announced that the mall will have a large extension by 2027.

=== Fashion Avenue ===
In March 2018, Emaar Malls unveiled a new extension of The Dubai Mall dedicated to fashion and luxury shopping. The 440,000-square-foot Fashion Avenue offers over 150 high-end fashion brands, including Burberry, Cartier, Miu Miu, Prada, Gucci, Mikimoto, Faberge, Valentino, and Christian Louboutin.

=== Dubai Fountain ===
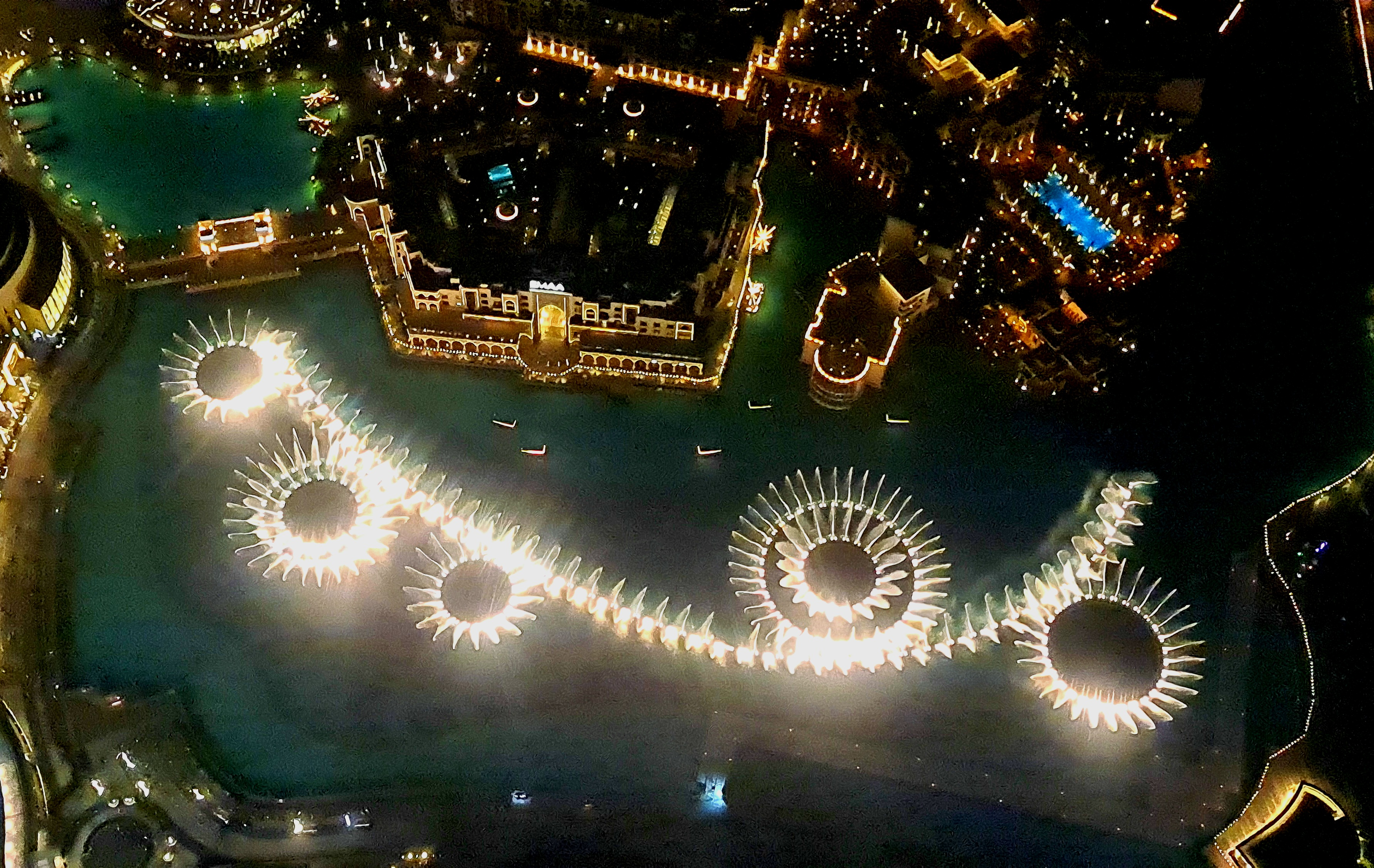
Aerial view of Dubai Fountain

At the center of Downtown Dubai and at a cost of Dh 800 million (US$217 million), the Dubai Fountain is the largest choreographed system in the world. It was designed by WET Design, the California-based company responsible for the fountains at the Bellagio Hotel Lake in Las Vegas. Illuminated by 6,600 lights and 50 colored projectors, it is 275 m (902 ft) long and able to shoot water 150 m (490 ft) into the air, accompanied by a range of classical to contemporary Arabic and world music. On 26 October 2008, Emaar announced, based on results of a naming contest, the fountain would be named the Dubai Fountain. In 2025, the fountain will be closed for 5 months for renovation works. The fountain reopened in October 2025 after completion of Phase 1 of its renovation. Phase 2 of the renovation will happen in 2026.

=== Address Hotels Dubai ===
Address Downtown

Kempinski The Boulevard Dubai

==== Address Downtown Dubai ====
Address Downtown Dubai is a supertall skyscraper rising 306 m (1,004 ft) alongside the Dubai Mall, the Old Town, and the Burj Khalifa Lake. This hotel and the residential tower contains a total of 63 floors. The tower is another supertall structure in the chain of Emaar's Address hotels which include Address Dubai Mall, Address Boulevard and Address Sky Views, all within the massive development of Downtown Dubai, which includes the centerpiece supertall building, Burj Khalifa. The tower was topped out in April 2008, becoming the 6th-tallest building in Dubai and the 36th-tallest in the world. In September 2008, the tower was completed. However, during the New Year's Eve party on 31st December 2015, the hotel caught a deadly fire which destroyed the building's cladding. No one was killed during the incident. The tower's reconstruction was completed in 2018.

==== Kempinski The Boulevard Dubai ====
The Kempinski The Boulevard Dubai, formerly known as the Address Boulevard, is a 73-storey 370 m (1,214 ft) hotel in Downtown Dubai. It has a restaurant, 3 pools, and views of the Burj Khalifa. The hotel permanently displays 251 specially-commissioned original artworks by 48 internationally renowned artists. The project was developed by Emaar Properties in 2012. The serviced residences sold out on the day of the launch of sales in September 2012. The hotel opened in 2017. In 2018, the Address Boulevard and the nearby Address Dubai Mall were sold to Abu Dhabi National Hotels for $598 million. In 2024, Abu Dhabi National Hotels announced that the Address Boulevard would be rebranded to Kempinski The Boulevard Dubai, thereby ending Emaar's management of the hotel.

==== Address Fountain Views ====
A group of 3 tall buildings that serve as hotels with views of the Burj Khalifa and Dubai Fountain.

==== Address Sky Views ====
Address Sky Views is famous for its Sky View Observatory which features a glass slide and a hanging platform 220 metres above the ground.

==== Address Dubai Opera Residences ====
A tall hotel that is located next to Burj Khalifa and Dubai Opera.

=== Dubai Opera ===
Dubai Opera

In August 2016, Emaar opened Dubai Opera, a 2,000-seat, multi-format, performing arts center located within The Opera District of Downtown Dubai. Styled on the classic Arabian dhow, the project was developed by Emaar Properties in collaboration with architect Janus Rostock. The venue hosts a wide array of performances coming from countries around the world, including theatre, opera, ballet, concerts, musicals, stand-up comedy shows and various seasonal events. Its plans were announced by Sheikh Mohammed bin Rashid Al Maktoum in March 2012. It opened on 31 August 2016 with a performance by Plácido Domingo.

=== Sheikh Mohammed bin Rashid Boulevard ===
Encircling Downtown Dubai, the 3.5 km road was previously known as Emaar Boulevard based on the area's developer. In December 2012, Emaar renamed the boulevard to pay tribute to Sheikh Mohammed bin Rashid Al Maktoum, Vice-President and Prime Minister of the UAE and Ruler of Dubai. The thoroughfare is famous for an impressive array of restaurants, cafes, and outdoor art exhibitions by Art Emaar, a cultural initiative of Emaar Properties.

=== Emaar New Year's Eve ===
Held in the center of Downtown Dubai every year, Dubai's New Year's Gala is one of the most celebrated events in Dubai. The celebration usually comprises a massive firework display on the Burj Khalifa at midnight and gathers hundreds of thousands of residents and tourists. In 2018, Emaar hosted a special light and laser show 'Light Up 2018', on the Burj Khalifa, which brought in over a million visitors and reached over 2.5 billion people through live television broadcast and live streams on social media. 'Light Up 2018' broke a world record for the 'largest light and sound show on a single building.' The fireworks returned for 2019 and is since been the most attended New Year's Party in Dubai.

=== Forte Towers ===
In May 2015, Emaar announced the twin tower project called Forte Towers – one of which will be a 70-storey building, making it the third tallest tower in the District. It was completed in 2023.

=== Burj Vista ===
According to a newspaper article in 2013, Emaar has launched two identically designed towers located on Muhammad Bin Rashid Boulevard in Downtown Dubai. One tower is 20 storeys high and the other is 65 storeys. They consist of 120 and 520 apartments respectively Completion and handover was in July 2018.

=== Grande ===
In September 2018, SSH has been chosen by Emaar and appointed WSP Burj Park Lake Dubai's Opera District. Tower 78 storey and 866 apartments for 30 June 2022.

=== Il Primo ===
Il Primo Tower Dubai

In May 2016, Emaar announced the twin tower project called Il Primo Towers - one of which will be a 77-floor building. Tower 2 was completed in 2025, while Tower 1 is under construction.
