= Dubai Fountain =

World's largest choreographed fountain system

Coordinates: 25.1951849°N 55.2750599°E

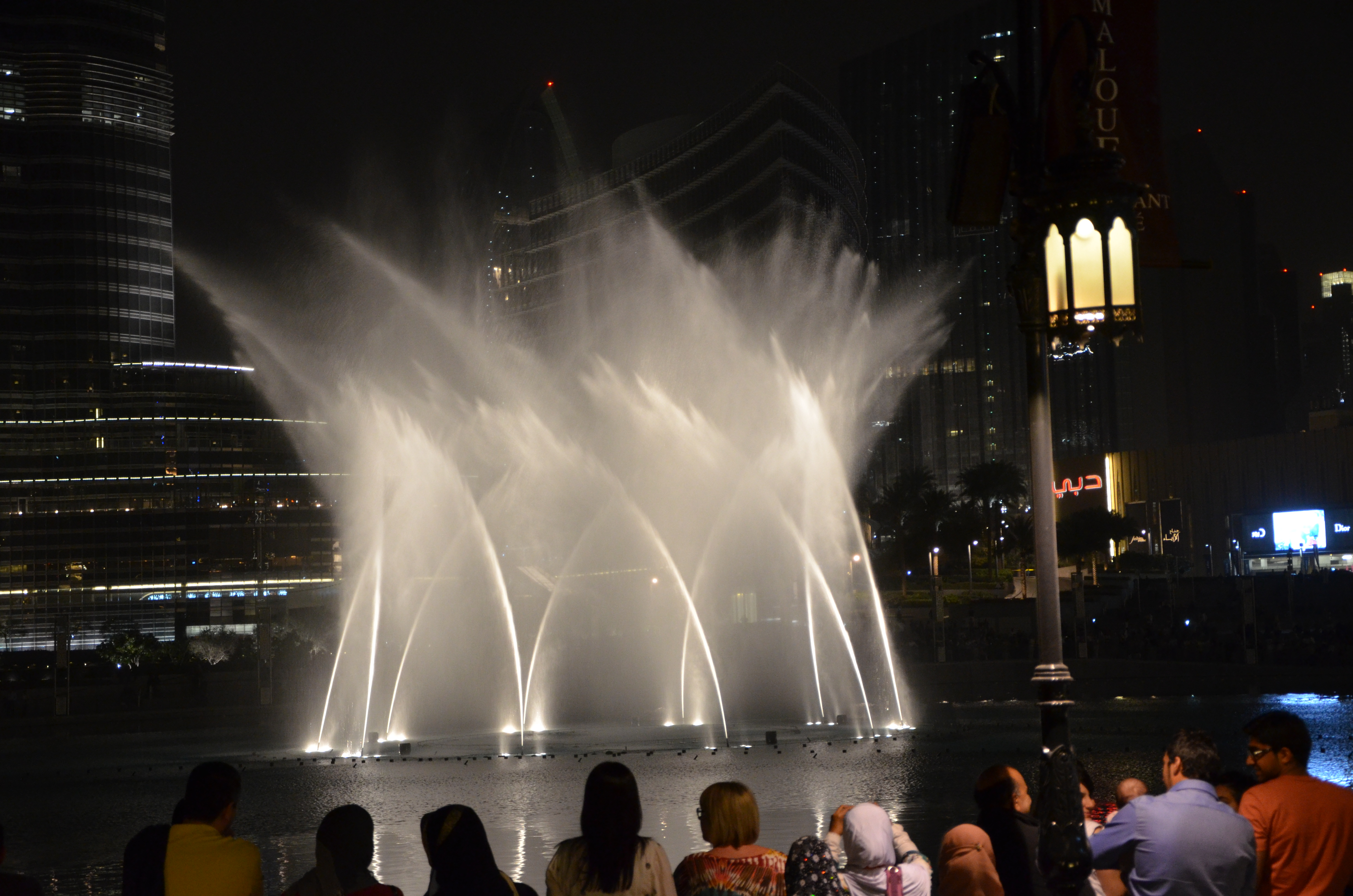
The Fountain Lake in front of Dubai Mall

The Dubai Fountain contains a choreographed fountain system located on the 12-hectare (30-acre) artificial Burj Khalifa Lake, at the center of the Downtown Dubai development in Dubai, United Arab Emirates. It was designed by WET Design, a California-based company also responsible for the fountains at the Bellagio Hotel Lake in Las Vegas. Illuminated by 6,600 lights and 25 colored projectors, it is 275 m (902 ft) long and shoots water up to 500 ft (152.4 m) into the air accompanied by a range of classical to contemporary Arabic and world music. It was built at a cost of Dhs 800 million (US$218 million). As of 2025, it is the world's largest choreographed fountain.

== Opening ==
The name of the fountain was chosen after a contest organized by the developer Emaar Properties, the result of which was announced on 26 October 2008. Testing of the fountain began in February 2009, and the fountain was officially inaugurated on 8 May 2009 along with the official opening ceremony of the Dubai Mall.

In February 2025, Emaar Properties announced that the fountain will be temporarily closed for 5 months due to renovation works. The renovation began slightly early on 19 April 2025, and it reopened on 1 October 2025. Renovations include repairing and treating its entire concrete base with sealants to limit leakage, facilitate maintenance, and provide a glowing effect, along with overall enhancements to the fountain devices, lighting, and sound systems. Phase 2 of the renovation will happen in 2026.

== Mechanism ==
The Dubai Fountain can spray 22,000 gallons (83,000 litres) of water in the air at any moment. More than 6,600 lights and 25 colour projectors have been installed. The fountain contains five circles of different sizes and two arcs. During the end of 2010, a new element was added to the fountain, fire, which outlined the fountains. The fire was temporary for the 2011 New Years celebration. The Dubai Fountains project water in the air in many different combinations and patterns. The beam of light from the fountain can be seen from over 20 miles away.

The Dubai Fountain consists of many high-pressure water jets created by WET, including Shooters, Oarsmen and water robots. The water robots make the water seem to dance while the WET Shooters shoot water upwards; Super Shooters, which shoot water under more pressure up to 73 m (240 feet) in the air, and Extreme shooters, which can shoot water under the most pressure to 500 ft (152.4 m) in the air. These WET Shooters create a loud "boom" noise after water is ejected. The Extreme Shooters are used the least during each show because it takes a lot of time to build up enough pressure and energy to shoot water that high in the air.

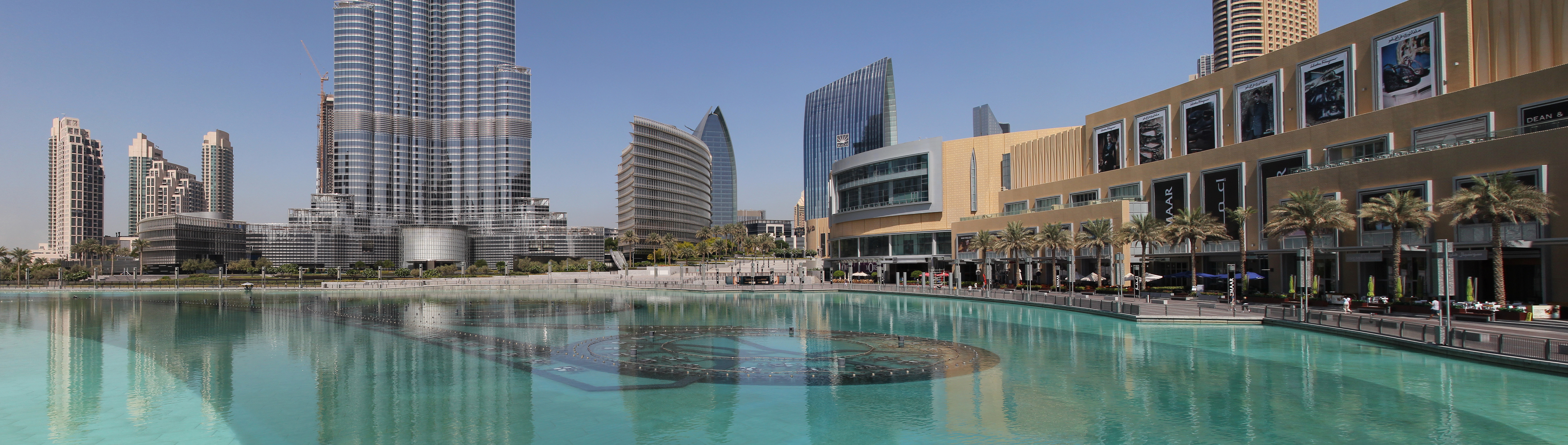
A panoramic view of Dubai Fountains Lake

== Performances ==
Nozzle distribution of The Dubai Fountain

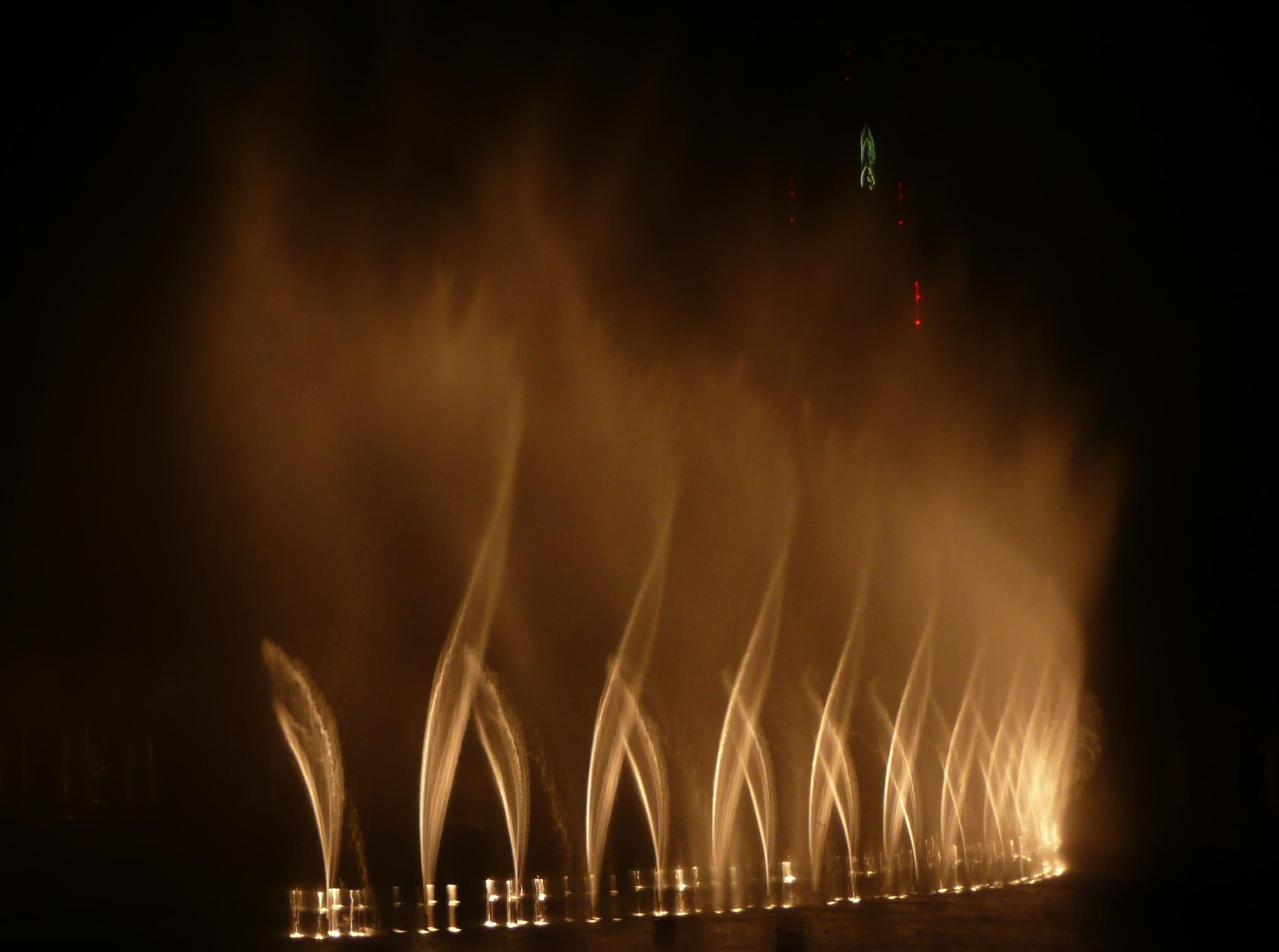
The Dubai Fountain performing to the song "Bassbor Al Fourgakom".

The Dubai Fountain Near The Dubai Mall

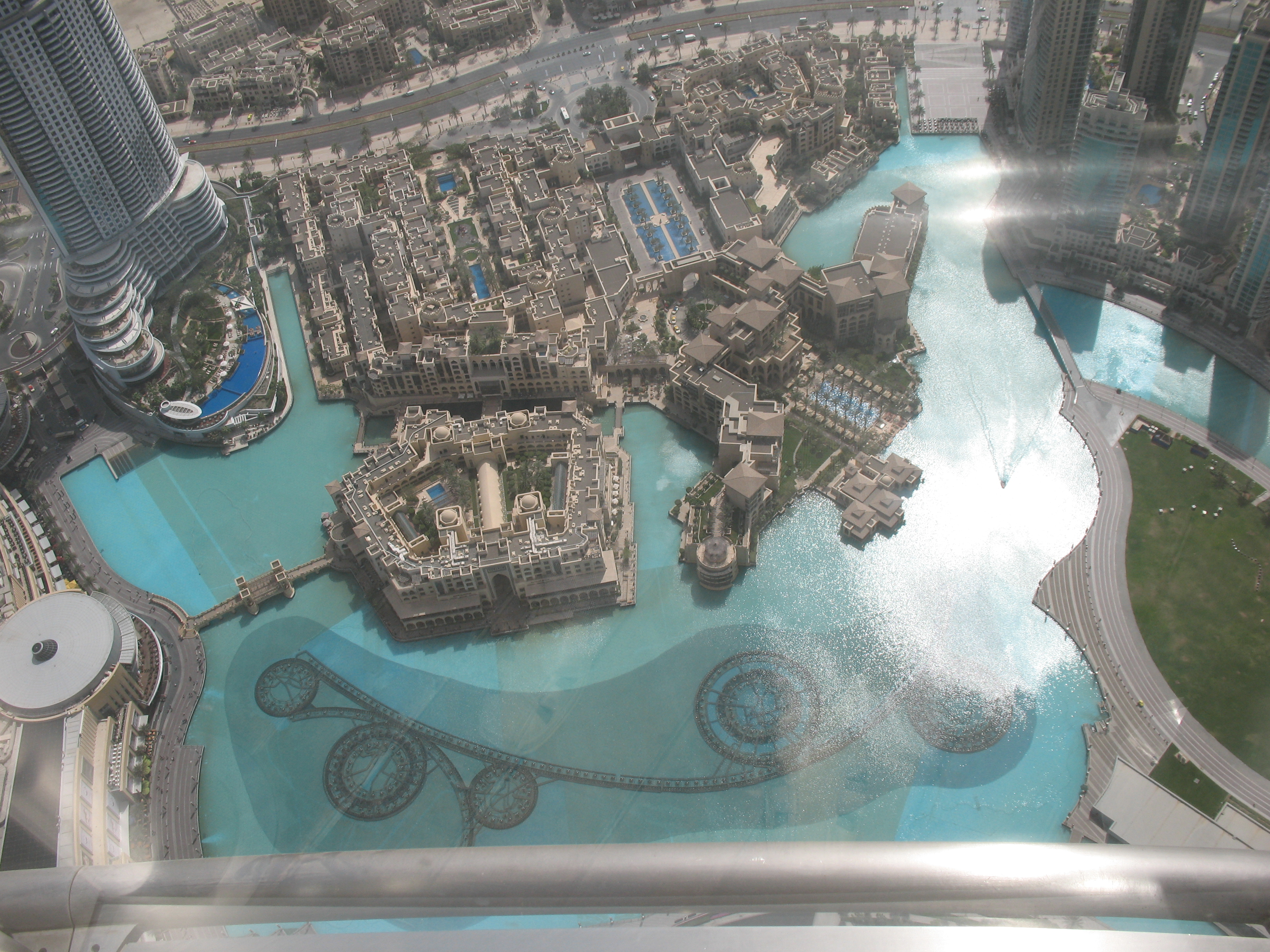
View of The Dubai Fountain from the observation deck

The fountain is animated with performances set to light and music. It is visible from every point on the lake promenade and from many neighbouring structures. Afternoon performances occur at 1:00 p.m. and 1:30 p.m. from Saturday till Thursday, and 2:00 p.m. and 2:30 p.m. on Friday. Evening shows take place between 6:00 p.m. until 11:00 p.m. at regular 30 minute intervals.

DHL Express premiered an advertising campaign at the Dubai Fountain on 20 October 2011. It was choreographed to a specially reworked version of the Motown classic "Ain't No Mountain High Enough", and was repeated for about a month.

All of the fountain's performances are accompanied by music played through speakers around the lake, although sometimes the fountains are operated without music for testing purposes.

=== Usage ===
In March 2016 the fountains and the mall were part of the Expo 2020 logo launch attended by managing director Reem Al Hashimy and prime minister Mohammed bin Rashid Al Maktoum. After the event the fountains danced to Whitney Houston's "I Will Always Love You".

=== Music ===
The responsibility of selecting music to be used in the fountain was given to Peter Kopik, the director of choreography & design at WET Design.

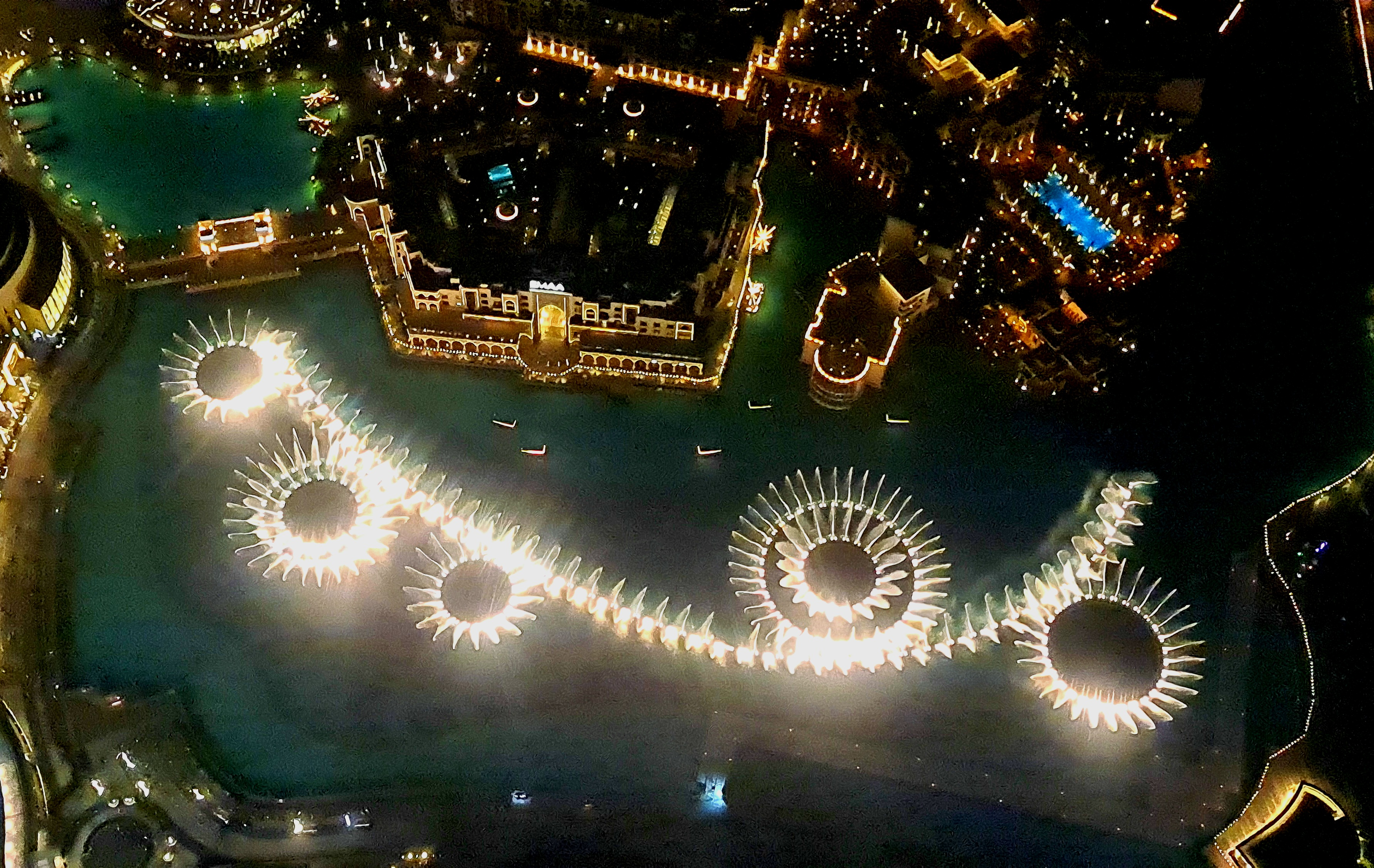
Dubai fountain show

=== Songs played through The Dubai Fountain ===
Amvaj (Waves) - Bijan Mortazavi

All Night Long (All Night) - Lionel Richie

Ain't No Mountain High Enough - Marvin Gaye featuring Tammi Terrell

Aa Bali Habibi - Elissa (singer)

Baba Yetu - Christopher Tin featuring Ron Ragin and Stanford Talisman

Butterfly Lovers Violin Concerto - Chen Gang (composer) and He Zhanhao

Baby Shark - Pinkfong

Dubai Kawkab Aakhar - Rashed Al-Majed

Esmaha Dubai - Coral Al Emarat

Enta Omri - Hossam Ramzy

Ezel (TV series) Jenerik (Intro) - Toygar Işıklı

Symphony No. 9 (Dvořák) (better known as "From The New World") - Antonín Dvořák

For The Win (SkyWorld) - Two Steps from Hell composed by Thomas Bergersen

Helowat Al Emiarat - Majid Al Mohandis

Hero (Enrique Iglesias song) - Enrique Iglesias

Ishtar Poetry - Furat Qaddouri

Inshed An Aldar - Mehad Hamad

I Will Always Love You - Whitney Houston

I'll Never Love Again - Lady Gaga

Kalinka Калинка - Lyudmila Zykina

Lana Allah - Mohammed Abdu

La Vie en rose - Édith Piaf

The Magnificent Seven Theme - Elmer Bernstein

Mon Amour - Jihad Akl

Mission Impossible Theme - Performed by Larry Mullen and Adam Clayton

Motasoa - Eida Al Menhali

Nessun dorma - performed by Luciano Pavarotti

Nasheed Ramadan - Mishari bin Rashid Alafasy

O mio babbino caro - performed by Kiri te Kanawa

Power (Exo song) - Exo

Shik Shak Shok - Hassan Abou Seoud

Skyfall - Adele

Sama Dubai - Mehad Hamad

Time To Say Goodbye Con te partirò - performed by Andrea Bocelli and Sarah Brightman

The Lights Of China - performed by Zhang Ye (singer) and Zhou Ye

Twalht Ana Lsoutk - Eida Al Menhali

The Prayer (Celine Dion and Andrea Bocelli song)

Wen Bie The Goodbye Kiss (album) - Jacky Cheung

Walk on the Wild Side (Lou Reed song)

Ya Ana Ya La - Amr Diab

== See also ==
- Musical fountain
- Aquanura
- WET Design
- Emaar Properties
