= Eida Al Menhali =

Emirati singer

Eida Al Menhali عيضه المنهالي
- Born: January 1, 1977 (age 49); Abu Dhabi, United Arab Emirates
- Genres: Arabic pop; Khaliji
- Occupations: Singer, poet
- Instrument: Vocals
- Years active: 2002–present
- Labels: EMI

Eida Al Menhali (Arabic: عيضه المنهالي; born 1 January 1977) is an Emirati singer. He is also referred to as Aida al-Menhali. Known for his hit single "Motasoa," he headlined at the Mother of the Nation Festival in 2018 at the Abu Dhabi Corniche, Abu Dhabi.

Al Menhali is also a composer and poet and often performs poetry without musical instruments. This style of performance is known in Arab world as Al Shallat. Having released his debut album, Mahma Jara, in 2002, Al Menhali has released six albums since. He has also toured extensively across the Persian Gulf and Middle East, performing in well-known festivals such as Hala February Festival, Salalah Concerts and Jerash Festival. Al Menhali has garnered praise from many local publications. Khaleej Times has described him as "a hugely popular artist in the region".

== Career ==
Al Menhali's debut album, Mahma Jara, was released in 2002.

In Abu Dhabi, as part of the 44th National Day celebration, he performed "a poem praising the nation and its Rulers, especially Sheikh Zayed." He was one of three UAE singers who opened the 17th edition of the AFC Asian Cup in Abu Dhabi at the Zayed Sports City Stadium in January 2019.

== Style ==
Al Menhali is also a composer and poet and often performs poetry without musical instruments. This practice is known as Al Shallat.

== Personal life ==
He has residence in the UAE and Morocco.

On 22 September 2018, the Moroccan news website Rue20 reported that Marrakesh security forces had arrested Al Menhali with 11 other foreign citizens and 30 Moroccan nationals, facing charges of prostitution, corruption, and drunkenness. He was reportedly released on bail. Al-Menhali called the arrest a false rumor, and was supported by Diana Haddad on social media. The Ambassador of Compositions denied the report of detention and said he had just communicated with his "friend Aida Al-Menhali" taking his annual vacation at his Morocco residence.

== Discography ==
=== Albums ===
- Mahma Jara (2002)
- Khayef Aleik (2003)
- Omsiyat Sheeriya (2006)
- Hadiyat Saif (2011)
- Shams Al Mahaba (2011)
- Mestareeh (2012)
- Gharami (2012)
- Qemt Al Zooq (2013)
