= Abu Dhabi National Hotels =

Broad-based hotel, tourism, transport and catering group

Coordinates: 24°25′18″N 54°26′46″E

Abu Dhabi National Hotels (ADNH) شركة أبوظبي الوطنية للفنادق
- Company type: Hospitality
- Industry: Hospitality
- Founder: Abu Dhabi National Hotels and Compass Group PLC
- Headquarters: , Abu Dhabi, United Arab Emirates
- Key people: Salem Al-Ameri (chairman); Ahmed Al Otaiba (vice chairman)
- Website: www.adnh.com

Abu Dhabi National Hotels is a broad-based hotel, tourism, transport and catering group, part of which is owned by the Abu Dhabi government.

The company's hotel division acts as a hotel developer and operator—partnering with Hilton, Sheraton, Sofitel and Meridien for some of its flagship properties. The majority of Abu Dhabi National Hotel's properties are located in Abu Dhabi. As of 2012, within the hotel and hotel apartment sector the company owned over 15 properties located in Abu Dhabi, Al Ain, Dubai, Sharjah and Fujairah.

== Timeline ==
Abu Dhabi National Hotels was founded in 1976 with a portfolio of three hotels acquired from the government. Sunshine Travel & Tours was established in 1986 as a pioneering initiative aimed at creating a tourism division. In 1988 Al Ghazal Transport became the first luxury transportation company in the Emirate. In 1991 Al Diar Hotels was the first homegrown operator and the first management contract was signed. In 2001 ADNH Compass was formed as a joint venture with the United Kingdom-based Compass Group PLC to cover catering demands across a wide range of industry sectors.
