= Emaar Properties =

Emirati real estate development company

Emaar Properties PJSC
- Type: Public
- Traded as: DFM: EMAAR
- Industry: Real estate
- Founded: 1997; 29 years ago
- Founder: Mohamed Alabbar
- Headquarters: Dubai, United Arab Emirates
- Key people: Jamal Bin Theniyah (chairman); Ahmed Jawa (vice chairman)
- Services: Commercial and residential property development
- Revenue: US$8.5 billion
- Net income: 6,777,915,000 United Arab Emirates dirham (2017)
- Total assets: 112,751,930,000 United Arab Emirates dirham (2017)
- Number of employees: 6,600
- Subsidiaries: Emaar Developments; Emaar International; Emaar Hospitality Group; Emaar Malls; Emaar Hotels & Resorts; Emaar Retail; Emaar Community Management; Emaar Technologies; Emaar Industries and Investments; Memaar Building Systems; OBC El-Wigh Dubai; OBC El-Wigh India; Amlak Finance; Emaar Investment Holdings; Hamptons International; Emaar Pakistan; Emaar India; Emaar Misr
- Website: emaar.com

Emaar Properties (or simply Emaar) is an Emirati real estate development company located in the United Arab Emirates. The two largest shareholders are Dubai Holding controlled by Dubai ruler Mohammed bin Rashid Al Maktoum and the Dubai's sovereign wealth fund Investment Corporation of Dubai.

It is a public joint-stock company, listed on the Dubai Financial Market, and has a valuation of US$16.8 billion as of August 2023 against the Net Asset Valuation of US$37.6 billion (AED 138.1B) as of December 2022 based on the valuation of assets done by third party valuer. Emaar Properties Dubai is one of the largest real estate developers in the UAE and is known for various large-scale projects, such as building Burj Khalifa, the tallest building in the world.

== History ==
=== 1997–2005 ===
Emaar Properties was founded and incorporated in 1997 by chairman Mohamed Alabbar. Emaar has interests in both commercial and residential property development, as well as malls and hospitality. The Dubai government initially owned 100% of the company while the founding shareholders held 24.3% when operations as a public company commenced after the IPO in 2000. The following year, Emaar announced plans to build Dubai Marina.

In 2000, Emaar Properties was listed on the Dubai Financial Market and became the first property company to offer shares to foreign nationals. The first phase of the company's developmental projects began in 2001 when Emaar awarded the contract in a joint venture to build three of the six apartment towers.

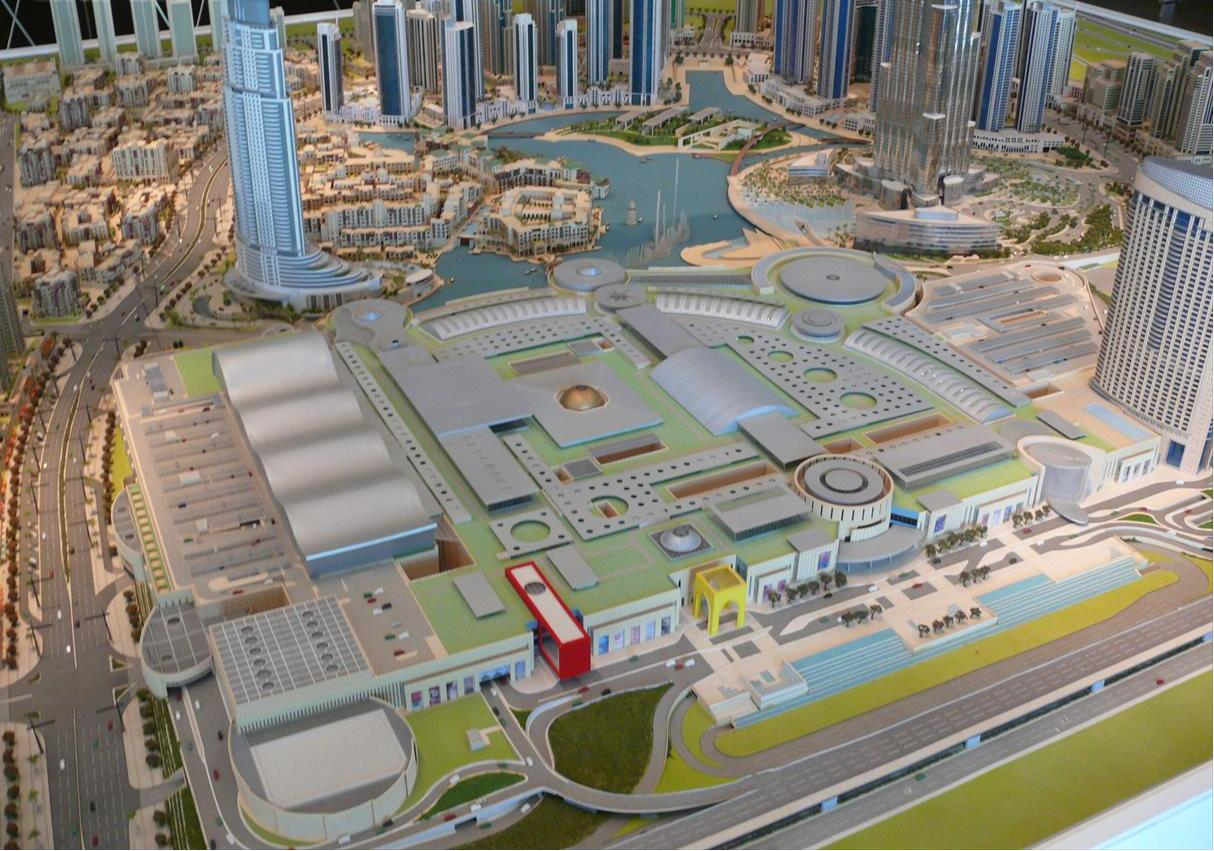
A scale model of The Dubai Mall

In 2003, the company revealed its plans for a signature development project, later known as Downtown Dubai. The project consisted of two developments: Burj Khalifa and The Dubai Mall, the world's tallest building and world's largest mall respectively. Emaar International LLC was established in 2004 and signified Emaar's expansion into foreign markets. The company has undertaken projects in Africa, Asia, North America, and throughout the Middle East.

=== 2006–present ===
The Dubai Mall officially opened in 2008, and Burj Khalifa in 2010. By 2014, Emaar was holding over $11.4 billion in real estate investments. In 2007, the company was majority-owned by Dubai's government. In 2009, John Laing Homes, a subsidiary of Emaar Properties which was acquired in 2006, filed for Chapter 11 bankruptcy protection in the US Court for the District of Delaware.

In July 2010, American businessman Lionel Lombard filed a lawsuit against Emaar Properties and its Chairman Mohamed Alabbar in a California federal court alleging he was wrongfully imprisoned and tortured because he had spoken up on behalf of Emaar foreign workers. The case was dismissed in November 2010 by Lombard.

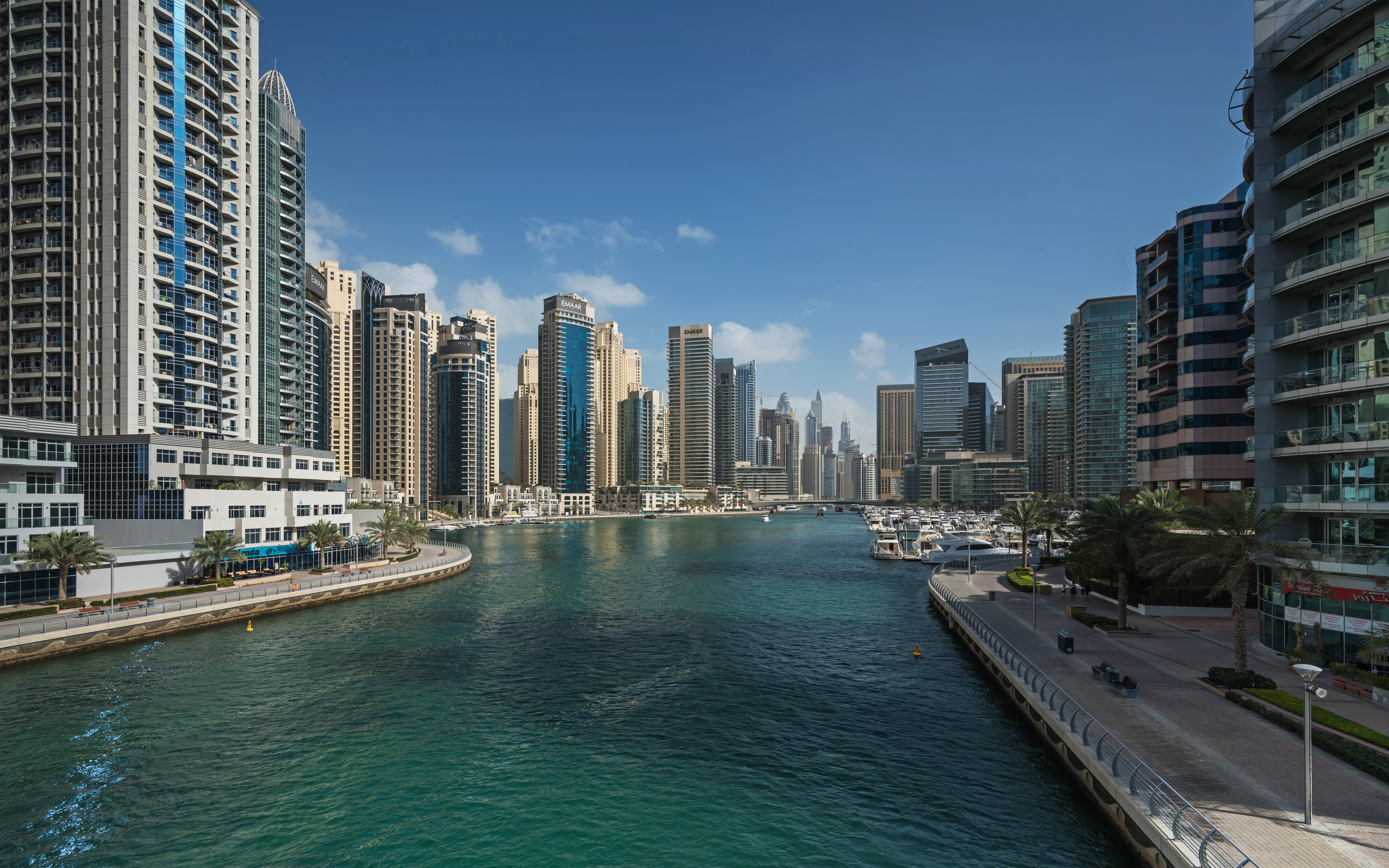
The Dubai Marina district

In September 2012, Emaar launched the Address BLVD, a luxurious 72 storey hotel and hotel serviced apartment project in Downtown Burj Dubai adjacent to the Dubai Mall. In 2014, Emaar Properties announced plans to sell shares of its malls and retail business to the public. The IPO was one of the largest in the region since the 2008 financial crisis. Emaar Malls Group became a publicly traded company on the Dubai Financial Market in October 2014. Closing at 3.25 dirhams with approximately 535 million shares traded, the IPO was the largest in Dubai since 2007. In November 2021, Emaar Properties reacquired the remaining minority shares via an all-share swap, delisting Emaar Malls from the Dubai Financial Market and merging it back into the parent company.

Also in 2014, Emaar opened the world's highest observation deck, At the Top, Burj Khalifa SKY. The highest man-made vantage point sits 555 metres up on the 148th floor of Burj Khalifa.

Emaar marked the new year with the world's most watched New Year's Eve (NYE) celebration for 2015. According to Guinness World Records, Emaar oversaw the "Largest LED-Illuminated Façade" on the world's tallest man made structure" during the NYE celebrations. The record-setting display consisted of 70,000 LED panels that flashed coloured lights and projections of the country's leaders and other images on the Burj Khalifa. Emaar reported a 16% rise in second-quarter net profit for 2015, and that it has a land bank of over 235 million square metres.

In November 2020, Emaar Properties announced a profit fall of 48% from the beginning of the year until September. In December 2020, Alabbar stepped down as Emaar chairman but continued to oversee the day-to-day activities as managing director. The Dubai Mall, developed by Emaar Properties, is the world's second largest shopping mall. It marked its soft opening in November 2008 and was inaugurated in May 2009. The mall has over 1,200 stores and 200 restaurants. It is also home to Dubai Aquarium and Underwater Zoo, KidZania, Dubai Ice Rink and the largest cinema complex in the region, Reel Cinemas. In 2014, The Dubai Mall had over 80 million visitors, of which 40% were tourists from outside the region. As an extension to Dubai Mall, Emaar began to develop a 55-storey residential building called Downtown Views.

Emaar Properties's Dubai Fountain is the tallest performing fountain in the world and began operating in the spring of 2009. Emaar developed the world's tallest building, Burj Khalifa, which opened in 2010. The building is 2,716.5 feet tall with 160 storeys that are primarily for residential purposes. It is named after the Abu Dhabi ruler Sheikh Khalifa bin Zayed Al Nahyan.

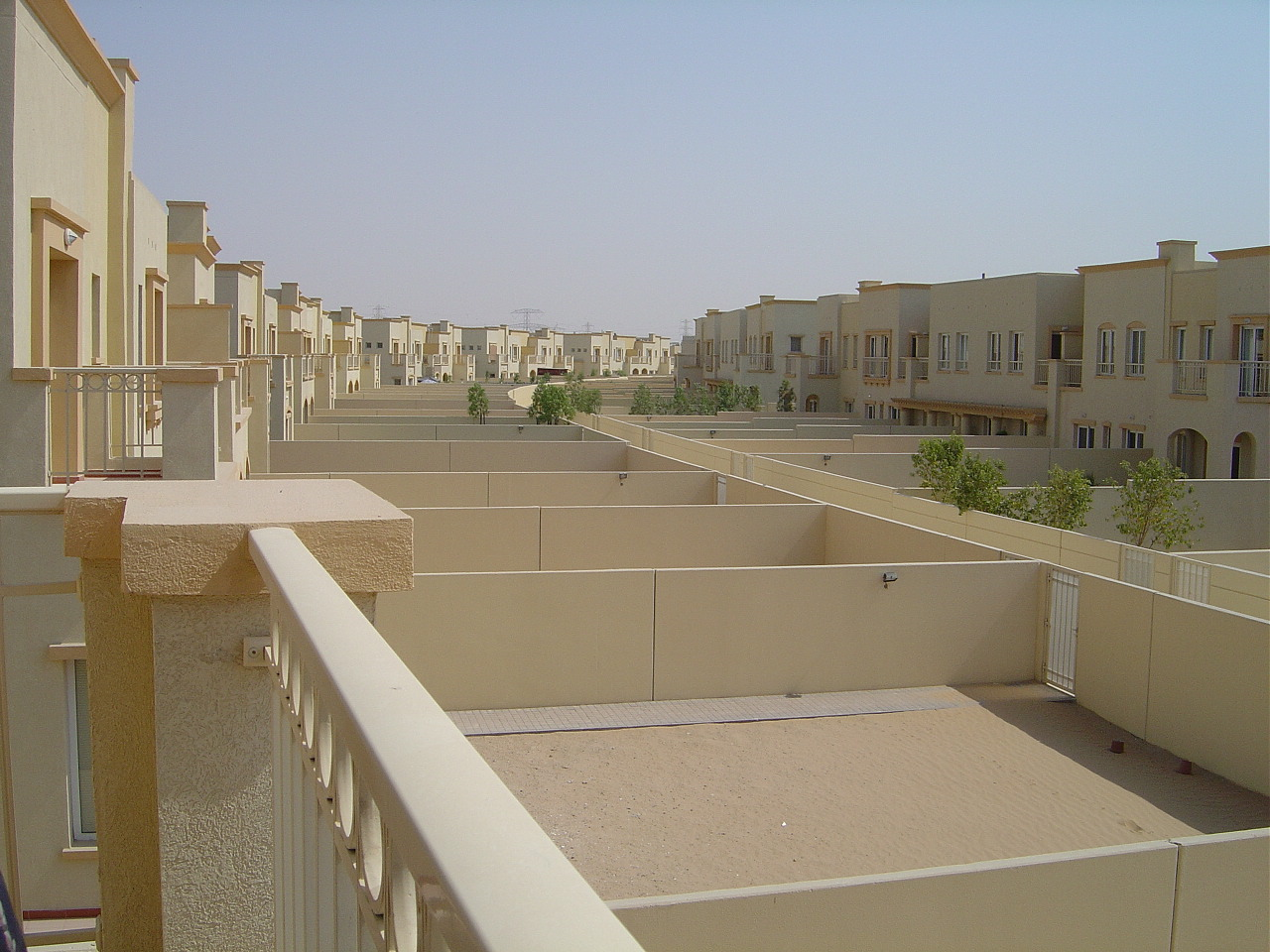
The Springs community

Emaar Properties has also developed a number of neighbourhoods throughout Dubai including Arabian Ranches, Dubai Marina, The Greens, The Meadows, The Lakes, and The Springs. In 2013, Emaar launched The Address Residence Fountain Views I, II, and III, The Address Residence Sky View, Burj Vista, Boulevard Point and Vida Residence—all in Downtown Dubai. A further addition to Downtown Dubai from Emaar was the Opera District. Key features include the Dubai Opera House, the country's first dedicated opera house.

Emaar owns Burj Khalifa, the world's tallest building standing at 828-metre (2,717 ft).

In January 2015, Emaar Hospitality opened a boutique hotel, Manzil Downtown Dubai. The hotel is managed by Vida Hotels and Resorts and includes 200 rooms, suites with Burj Khalifa views, and access to a sports hub and several restaurants. Emaar rolled out the region's first hop-on-hop-off transit system with the Dubai Trolley. The trolley was the world's first hydrogen-powered, zero-emission street tram system. It closed in 2019.

In 2016, Emaar Properties announced plans to build the world's tallest structure, which would be taller than Burj Khalifa. It was expected to be completed by 2020. Construction was halted during the COVID-19 pandemic and in 2024, Emaar redesigned the tower, now named Dubai Creek Tower explicitly dropping the "world's tallest" height.

Emaar Properties was ranked 19th on Forbes Middle East's Top 100 Listed Companies 2025 list.

== International projects ==
Through various subsidiaries, Emaar has established property developments and projects in Pakistan, India, Jordan, Egypt, Lebanon, Morocco, the United States, Saudi Arabia, Syria, Iraqi Kurdistan, and Turkey. Some of the projects have included developments such as the Beit Misk in Lebanon, the Jeddah Gate in Saudi Arabia, and the Samarah Dead Sea Resort in Jordan.

=== USA ===
In 2006, Emaar acquired John Laing Homes, then the second-largest privately held developer in the United States for $1 billion in cash. This acquisition led to the formation of Emaar North America, which oversaw major real estate projects across the U.S. and Canada. Among its most notable developments was Beverly West, an ultra-luxury condominium tower in Los Angeles that attracted high-profile residents including Ellen DeGeneres and The Weeknd.

=== Egypt ===
Emaar Misr began working on a $4 billion development project in 2005 on the Moqattam Plateau in Cairo, initially called Cairo Grand Heights that was later renamed Uptown Cairo. The project included building up an area as a residential, commercial, and recreational community.

In 2006, Emaar Misr, an Egyptian subsidiary of Emaar Properties, completed an agreement with the Bibliotheca Alexandrina to redevelop part of its property on the eastern harbor of Alexandria. The new library facility stands almost exactly where the ancient Library of Alexandria existed, however the project has never materialized.

In 2008, Emaar Misr began working on a tourist resort called Marassi in Sidi Abdel Rahman, located along Egypt's Mediterranean coast, that includes a 3,000 room hotel, a marina, and a golf course. The project also included the renovation of the well-known Al-Alamein Hotel, located within the property.

=== India ===
Emaar India has a portfolio of projects spanning all key segments of the Indian real estate industry, including residential, commercial, retail (malls) and hospitality. The company has a land bank of some 6,000 acres to be used for future development. Its existing assets and ongoing projects, as also its land banks, are spread across India: Delhi NCR (particularly Gurugram), Mohali, Chennai, Hyderabad, Lucknow, Jaipur and Indore.

Emaar entered India in the early 2000s by winning the bid for the Hyderabad International Convention Centre, A joint venture, the Cyberabad Convention Centre Private Limited (CCCPL), was floated specifically for this project, with the other partner being the Andhra Pradesh Industrial Infrastructure Corporation (APIIC). The convention center, which has a total seating capacity of 4,000 seats (extendable to 6,500 seats) was completed in December 2005.

In 2005, while the Hyderabad project was ongoing, Emaar entered into a joint venture to handle projects in India. Emaar India was founded in 2005 as a joint venture of Emaar Properties PJSC with MGF Developments Limited of India, in which Emaar was by far the larger equity partner and MGF was entrusted the operational responsibilities. The joint venture executed several significant projects, such as the 2010 Commonwealth Games Village in Delhi.

In April 2016, Emaar announced that it would separate from its joint venture partner and divide the company vertically. Shortly after the announcement, Emaar filed the demerger scheme in the Delhi High Court. In pursuance of the intended demerger, the company was, as of 2016, undergoing a restructuring exercise, wherein Emaar had taken control of all the ongoing projects of the company to ensure their completion at the earliest. The company committed to deliver 11,000 units by end of 2018.

In late 2021, a Memorandum of Understanding was signed between the governments of Dubai and Jammu & Kashmir to facilitate investment into specific projects. Under the agreement, Emaar was set to develop a shopping mall in Srinagar of 500,000 sq.ft. At the time, EMAAR was also considering other investments in hospitality and mixed use commercial and residential projects in Jammu city and in Srinagar city.

=== Saudi Arabia ===
The King Abdullah Economic City (KAEC), developed by Emaar, The Economic City (Emaar E.C.) is listed on Tadawul, the Saudi stock exchange, and is the largest private investment in Saudi Arabia. The project includes the development of a special economic zone along the Red Sea coast 60 miles north of Jeddah. Emaar E.C. also heads the development of the KAEC port. The port is the first privately owned port for Saudi Arabia and was first opened in January 2014, but plans to further expand have been set in place after the generation of new financing. The KAEC development is projected to be about the same size as Washington, D.C. when completed and the zone is estimated to house approximately 2 million people and assist in aiding the Saudi Arabian economy in expanding beyond oil to light and shipping industry.

=== Syria ===
Emaar Properties first announced its plans for a large-scale development project in Syria in 2006. The development, known as The Eighth Gate, includes three zones: a commercial center, waterfront and residential zone, and tourist area. The project is a joint venture between Emaar Properties and IGO, an offshore investment and property development company.

=== Turkey ===
The Tuscan Valley development was Emaar's first project in Turkey. Emaar completed the first phase of the Tuscan Valley venture by 2007, which included the development of luxury villas and commercial space just outside Istanbul. In 2012, Emaar began developing an Emaar Square project. The project plans include building Turkey's largest shopping mall and five-star hotels. In 2013, Emaar Turkey, the wholly owned subsidiary of Emaar Properties, launched The Address Residences Emaar Square in Istanbul. In 2017, Emaar Square Mall in Turkey was opened to the public.

=== Pakistan ===
The Crescent Bay, Karachi is a 440,000 m^{2} under-construction upscale mixed-use oceanfront development in Defence, Karachi, Pakistan. It is considered one of the biggest projects in Pakistan, with a cost of $2.4 billion. The development features a series of high and mid-rise towers for residential and commercial use, a shopping centre, a five-star beachfront hotel and a tower located in the heart of the project.

The Canyon Views is a project of Emaar in Islamabad, Pakistan.

=== Iraqi Kurdistan ===
Downtown Erbil is a project for a large-scale mixed-use complex in Erbil. The project was launched by Emaar Properties in 2013 and covers an area of 541,000 square meters. This area will be used for residential apartments, hotels and a shopping mall.

== Management ==
- Mohammed Alabbar, Founder and Chairman
- Amit Jain, CEO
