= At the Top (Burj Khalifa) =

Burj Khalifa observation deck

Coordinates: 25.1975°N 55.2792°E

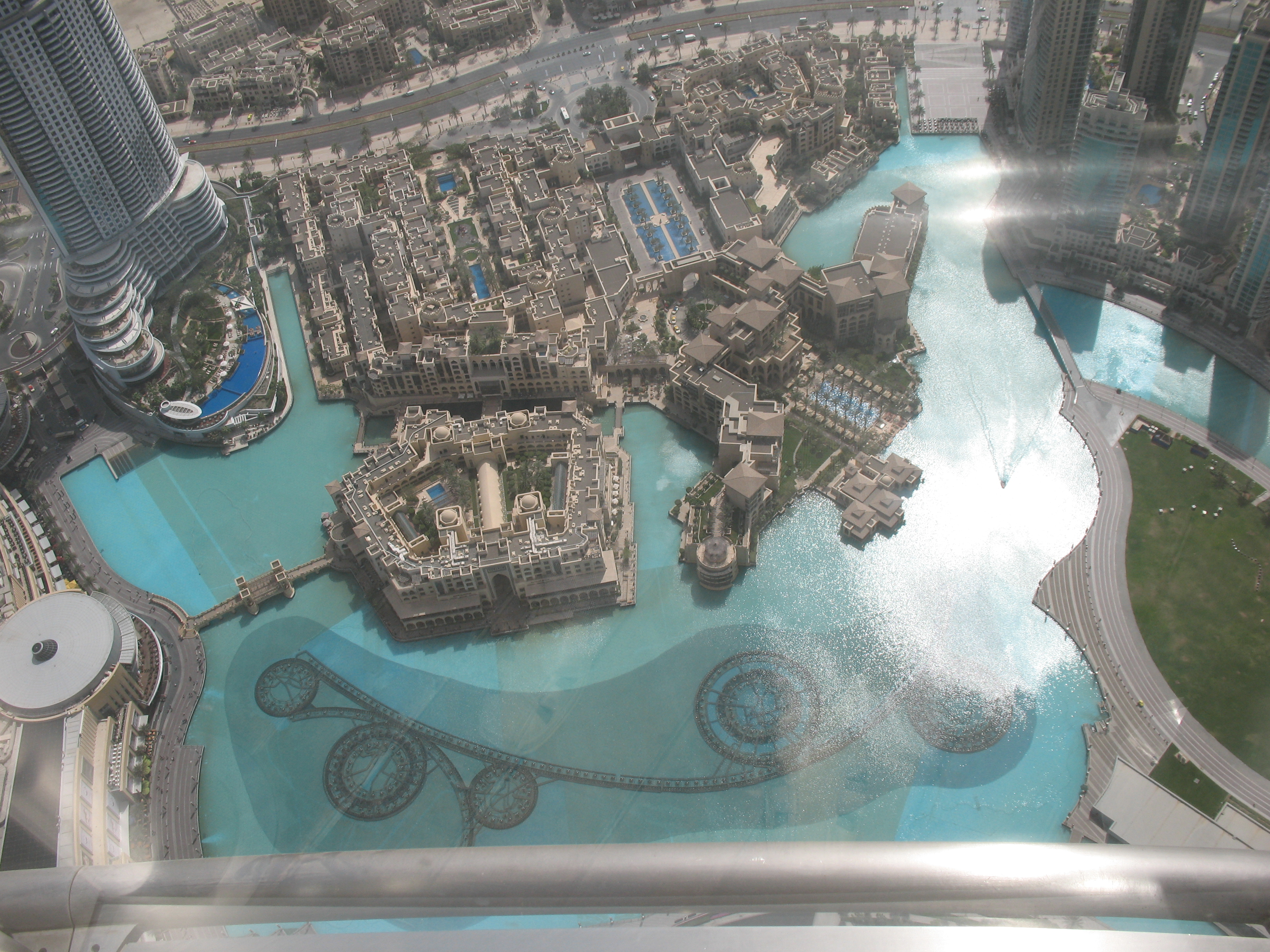
View of The Dubai Fountain from the observation deck

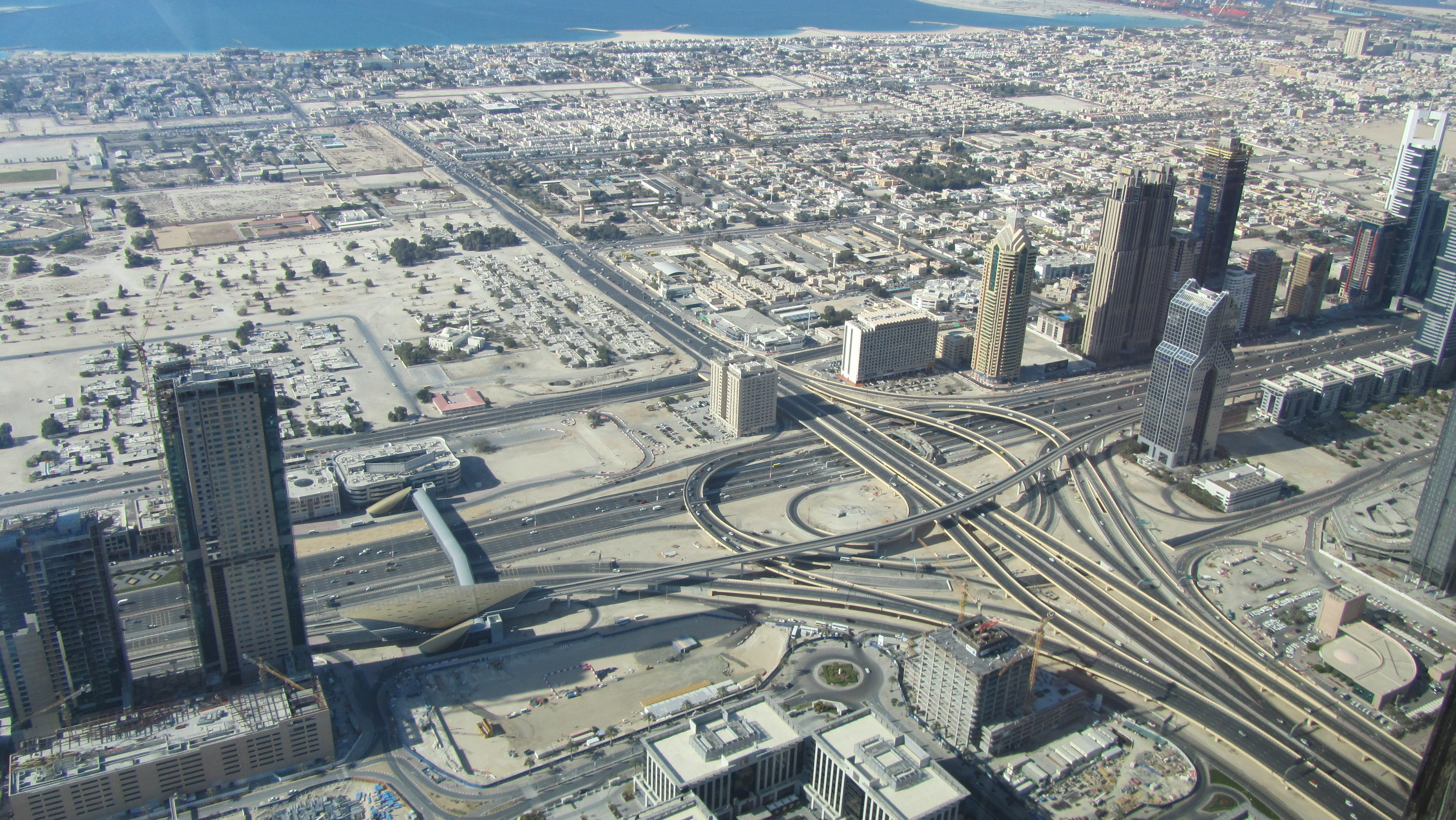
View from the observation deck

At The Top, Burj Khalifa is a series of observation decks on the 124th and 125th floors of the Burj Khalifa which opened to the public on 5 January 2010. At 452 m (1,483 ft), it boasted the highest manmade observation deck in the world at the time This record was subsequently broken and regained twice with the respective openings of the At The Top, Burj Khalifa SKY and The Lounge, Burj Khalifa levels.

The 124th floor observation deck features augmented reality telescopes developed by Gsmprjct° of Montréal, which allows visitors to view the surrounding landscape in real-time, and to view previously saved images such as those taken at different times of day, under different weather conditions, and a historical view taken by helicopter from before the tower's completion. To moderate the amount of crowding, entrance tickets are sold in limited quantities by specific dates and times. Once inside, there is no limit to the length of stay, but there is also no reentry privilege.

On 8 February 2010, the observation deck was closed to the public for two months after power-supply problems caused an elevator to become stuck between floors, trapping a group of tourists for 45 minutes.

When the tide is low and visibility is high, it may be possible to see the shores of Iran from the top of the skyscraper.

== At The Top SKY and The Lounge ==
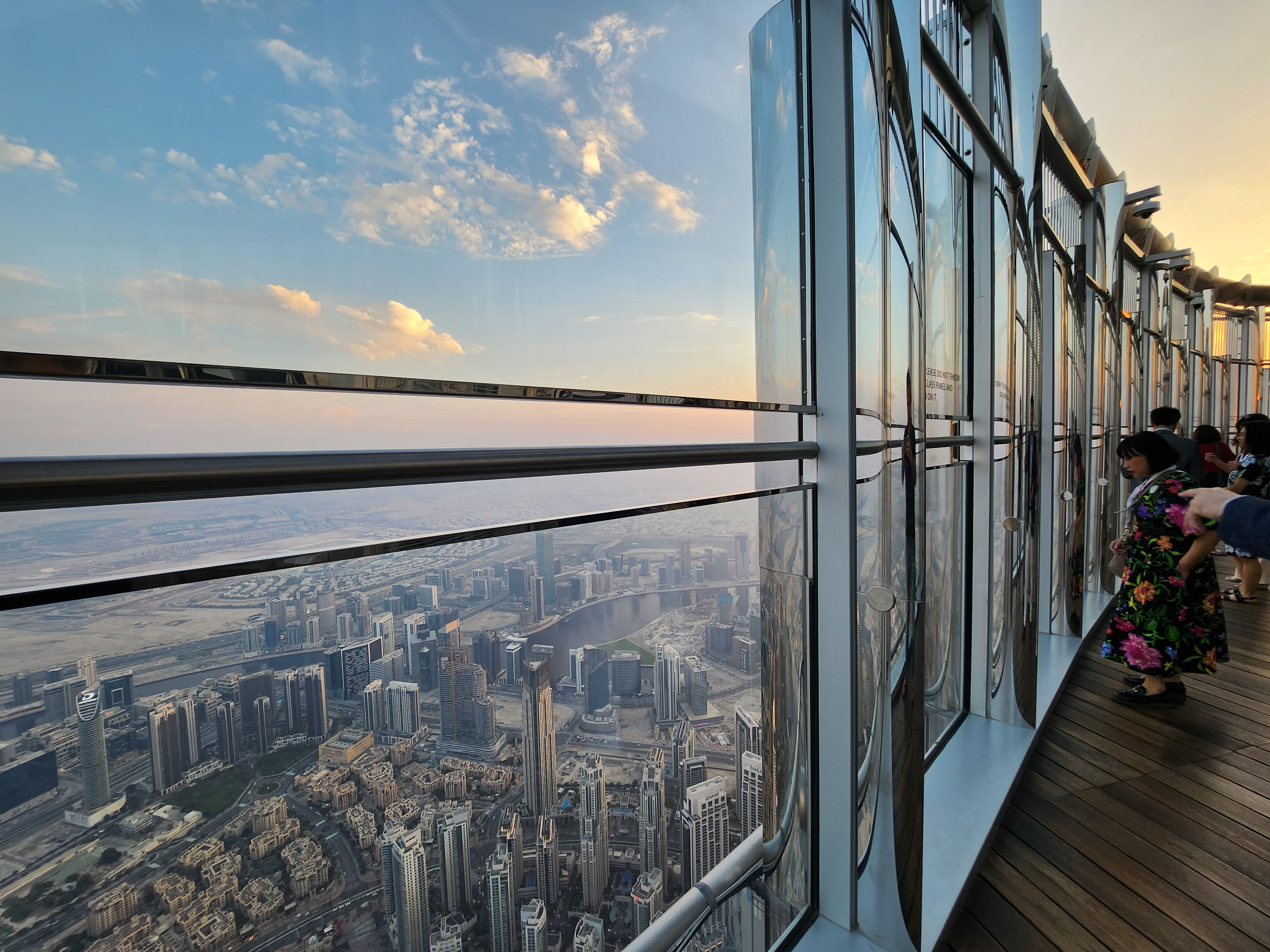
148th floor Observation Deck

In 2014, At The Top opened its premium SKY level at 555 m (1,821 ft) on the 148th floor, allowing Burj Khalifa to recover its title for highest observation deck in the world, which it had lost in 2011 to Cloud Top 488 in the Canton Tower, Guangzhou. SKY held this record until the Top of Shanghai in Shanghai Tower opened in 2016 at a height of 562 m (1,844 ft). Burj Khalifa then regained the title of highest observation deck in 2019 at 585 m (1,919 ft) upon opening of The Lounge in the tower's topmost habitable floors 152 through 154.

SKY and The Lounge are premium levels that offer light refreshments, additional seating, and an outdoor deck of their own. The Lounge offers complimentary canapés and cocktails can be bought there. Entry into either level is a one-time entry but also covers the levels below on the way out.

== See also ==
- At.mosphere, restaurant below the observation deck

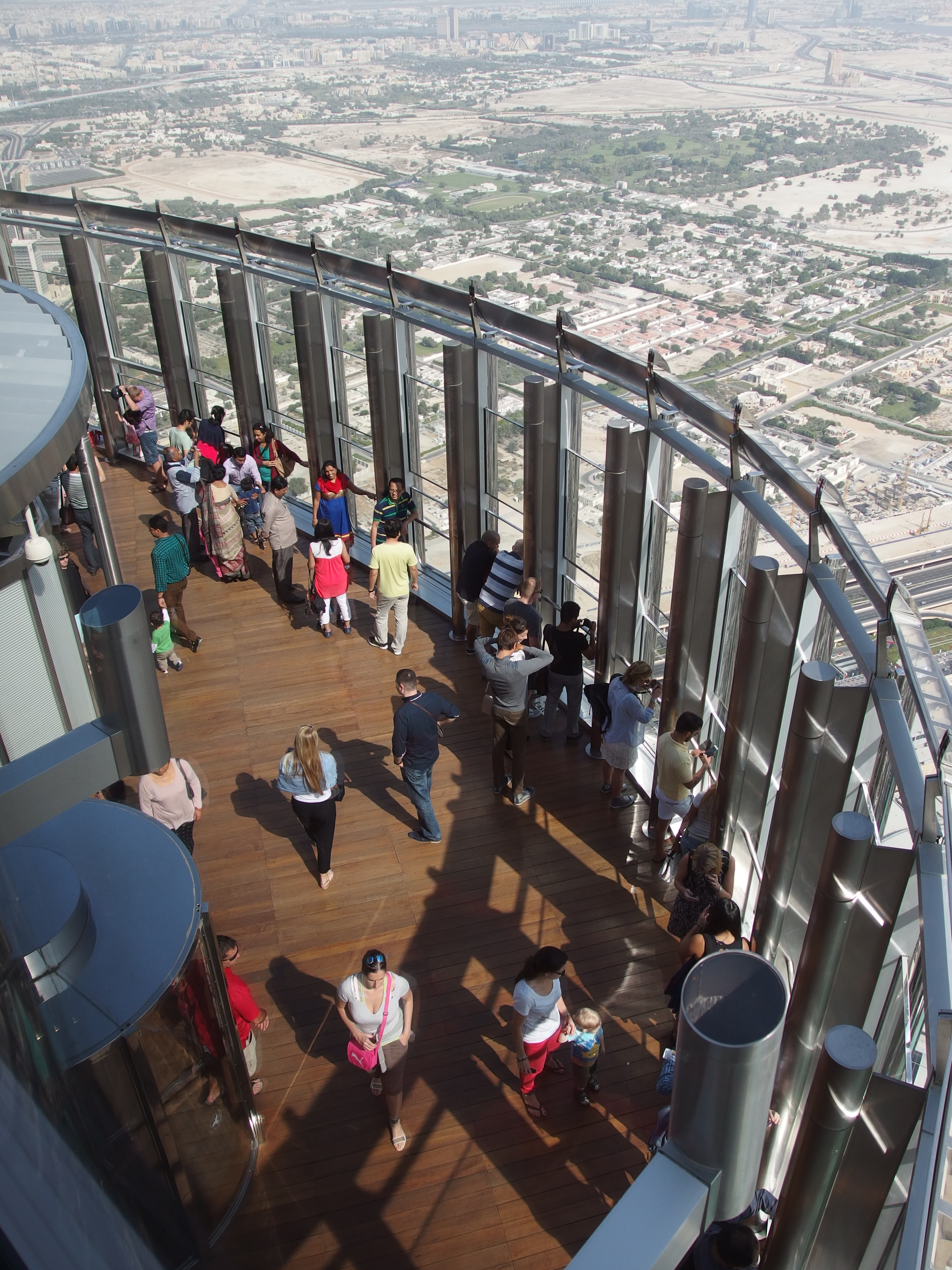
124th floor
