= Far East Global Group =

Company of Hong Kong

- Type: Public
- Industry: Construction
- Founded: 1969
- Headquarters: Eight Commercial Tower, Hong Kong, China
- Key people: Zhou Yong, Chairman
- Products: Design, supply and installation of curtain wall, glass wall
- Revenue: HKD$1,296 million (FY2012)
- Number of employees: 1,429
- Parent: China State Construction International Holdings Limited

Far East Global Group was first established in 1969 in Hong Kong as a small workshop and the business was incorporated in 1977 as Far East Aluminium Works Company Limited. Through years of growth and expansion, the workshop has been transformed from a small aluminium windows contractor into a multi-national enterprise. In 1991, the then newly incorporated holding company, Far East Aluminium (Holdings) Limited (“FEAHL”), successfully went public and became a listed company in Hong Kong.

Internationally, Far East Global Group has been hired as the key exterior facade contractor in various countries including, United Arab Emirates, United States, Canada, Chile, Singapore, Macau and mainland China.

In April 2008, Far East Aluminum has officially been renamed as Far East Group Limited.

In December 2009, Far East Group Limited officially changed its name to Far East Global Group Limited.

== History ==
In May 1999, China National Aero-Technology Import & Export Corporation acquired a controlling interest in the Previously Named Far East Aluminum Works and became the controlling shareholder. In August of the same year, FEAHL was renamed to CATIC International Holdings Limited (“CATIC”).

In late 2007, Showmost Group Limited, a company jointly owned by Lotus China Fund II L.P. (“Lotus”) and Starflash Investment Limited, obtained the entire equity interests in FEA Holdings Limited (“FEA”), the immediate holding company of all operating companies within the then FEAHL for the facade and cladding engineering businesses, and FEA ceased to be a subsidiary of CATIC.

In March 2010, Far East Global Group successfully went public and became a listed company in Hong Kong (HK.0830).

In March 2012, Far East Global Group became a member of China State Construction International Holdings.

== Key Management ==
Far East Global Group consists of several key Directors and senior Management who manage the entire operations of Far East Global Group

This Includes:

- Dr. Cheong Chit Sun, Jackson - Chief Executive Officer
- Mr. Chan Sim Wang, Vincent - Chief Financial Officer
- Mr. Wang Hai, Harry - Chief Operation Officer
- Mr. Ho Wai Man, Raymond - President of Asia Pacific Division
- Mr. Elliot Kracko - President of North America Division
- Mr. Qu Baocheng, Patrick - President of PRC Division
- Mr. Edward Boyle - Vice President of Asia Pacific Division
- Mr. Jim Mitchell - Vice President of North America Division
- Mr. Li Xuguang, Sunny - Vice President of PRC Division
- Mr. Mok Wai Him, Jim - Project Director
- Mr. Lau Sai Ying, Alan - Marketing Director

== Key Projects ==
- Burj Khalifa
- Cosmopolitan of Las Vegas, Las Vegas
- The Venetian Macau
- International Finance Centre, Shanghai

== Current Developments ==
- Kai Tak Cruise Terminal, Hong Kong
- New York Police Academy, New York
- Shangri-La, Toronto
- Marina Bay Sands, Singapore
- University of Montreal Hospital Centre (CHUM), Montreal
- Constanera Center, Chile
- Upper West Side T2, Melbourne
- Micron, Singapore
