= At.mosphere =

Restaurant in Dubai, United Arab Emirates; highest restaurant in the world

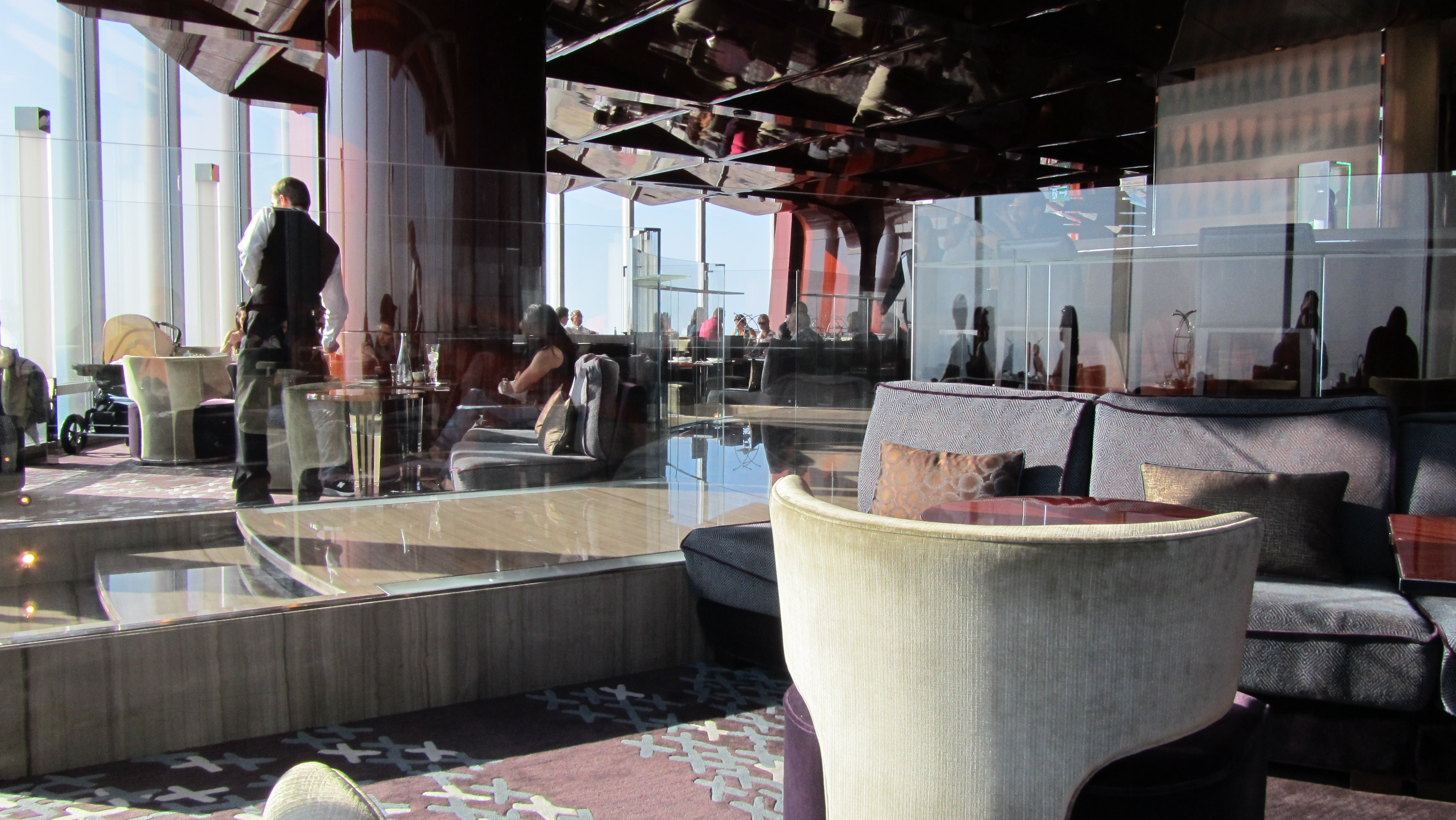
- Interactive map of At.mosphere

Restaurant information
- Established: January 23, 2011 (first time); February 2023 (reopening)
- Closed: August 11, 2022 (renovation)
- Owner: Emaar Properties
- Head chef: Yannis Sgard
- Location: 122nd floor of the Burj Khalifa, Dubai, United Arab Emirates
- Coordinates: 25°11′49.7″N 55°16′25.0″E
- Reservations: Yes
- Website: www.atmosphereburjkhalifa.com

At.mosphere is a restaurant on the 122nd floor of the Burj Khalifa in Dubai, United Arab Emirates. It is among the world's highest restaurants at 441.3 meters (1,447 feet) from ground level.

The restaurant is run by head chef and Paris native, Yannis Sgard.

== History ==
At.mosphere first opened on January 23, 2011. It has a bar, lounge, and restaurant area. On August 11, 2022, the restaurant closed for 6 months due to renovations. There was a reopening ceremony in February of the next year with a refurbished interior. In 2011, Guinness World Records certified it as the "highest restaurant from ground level".

It has received numerous awards and praise by critics including: a Recommend in the 2024 edition of the Michelin Guide Dubai, the Wine Spectator Best of Award of Excellence in 2014 and 2024, the Time Out Dubai Best Romantic Restaurant of 2022, and the World Culinary Awards' World's Best Landmark Restaurant of 2023 award.

== See also ==
- At the Top (Burj Khalifa), observation deck on the floors above
- Windows on the World, restaurant located on the 107th floor of the original 1 World Trade Center
- John Hancock Center, Chicago skyscraper which formerly featured a restaurant on its 95th and 96th floors
