= Ajax Experience =

- Location of the museum in Amsterdam
- Established: 24 September 2011
- Dissolved: 1 August 2013
- Location: Rembrandtplein, entry at Utrechtsestraat 9; 1017 DA Amsterdam
- Coordinates: 52.3661°N 4.8978°E
- Type: Sports Museum
- Curator: Paul van den Boom

The Ajax Experience was a museum dedicated to the history of the Dutch professional football club AFC Ajax in Amsterdam in the Netherlands. The museum, located at the Rembrandtplein, was opened on 24 September 2011 and closed within two years after a 9 million euro loss.

== History ==
On 24 September 2011, Ajax Amsterdam opened the Ajax Experience as an attempt to bring the World of Ajax stadium tour, based at the Amsterdam Arena, closer to Amsterdam-Centrum. Designed by Sid Lee and Gsmprjct°, the Ajax Experience was an interactive experience which aimed to share the philosophy of the club with the public, as well as bringing the audience closer to the likes of Johan Cruyff, Marco van Basten and Wesley Sneijder. Various national and international trophies won by the club over the years were on public display. With an estimated 3.5 million to 4.5 million fans in the Netherlands and more abroad, the Ajax Experience aimed to expand beyond the Amsterdam ArenA and Sportpark De Toekomst to reach those fans who were visiting Amsterdam as tourists and not looking to travel too far from the central area's trusted attractions, such as the Stopera, Joods Historisch Museum, Tunfun, and Artis.

== Location ==
Situated on the Rembrandtsplein, a historic square in central Amsterdam, in a former ABN-AMRO banking facility, the 1,400 m^{2} space housed an interactive experience featuring cinematic match summaries and showcasing the successes and big names associated with the club.

== Dissolution ==
On 23 July 2013 it was announced that Ajax would discontinue the Ajax Experience, citing a loss in revenue. The World of Ajax situated at the stadium continued to serve as a tourist attraction for the club, while the fan shop situated at the Experience location remained open until 1 February 2014. The Experience made a reported €9 million loss, which resulted in its shutdown only 2 years after its opening.

== See also ==
- World of Ajax
