= World of Ajax =

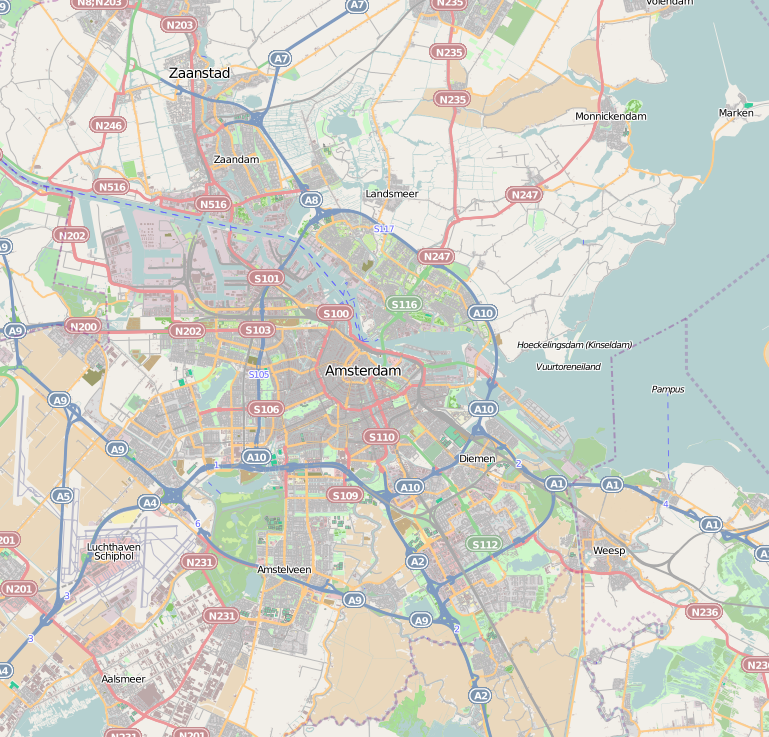
- Location of the museum in Amsterdam
- Established: August 14, 1996
- Location: Johan Cruyff Arena
- Coordinates: 52.312660°N 4.942487°E
- Type: Sports Museum
- Website: Official website (in Dutch)

The World of Ajax is a museum and stadium tour dedicated to AFC Ajax' club history in Amsterdam in the Netherlands. The museum, located at the Johan Cruyff Arena, was opened on 14 August 1996 and is open daily for tours. There are two versions of the tour which involve different parts and elements of the Stadium and environment, namely the World of Ajax and the World of Ajax Kids Tour, one for children and one for the adults.

== History ==
In 1996, the Dutch football club, AFC Ajax, relocated to their new facility to the newly opened Amsterdam ArenA. The stadium includes a museum and fan shop section which are open to the public with a tour starting every hour from 11:00–17:00 CET taking the visitor to various parts of the stadium, through the locker rooms, and alongside the pitch, to see the club's Wall of Fame and the Club van 100.

== Location ==
The museum and tour are situated in the Johan Cruyff ArenA in Amsterdam-Zuidoost inside the club's home stadium.

== See also ==
- History of AFC Ajax
- Ajax Experience
