= Burj Khalifa =

Skyscraper in Dubai, United Arab Emirates

Coordinates: 25°11′50″N 55°16′27″E

- برج خليفة

- The Burj Khalifa viewed across the Dubai Fountain in October 2012

Record height
- Tallest in the world since 2011^{[I]}
- Preceded by: Taipei 101

General information
- Status: Completed
- Type: Mixed-use
- Architectural style: Neo-futurism
- Location: 1 Sheikh Mohammed bin Rashid Boulevard, Dubai, Emirate of Dubai, United Arab Emirates
- Named for: Sheikh Khalifa
- Construction started: 6 January 2004; 22 years ago
- Topped-out: 17 January 2009; 17 years ago
- Completed: 1 October 2009; 17 years ago
- Opened: 4 January 2010; 16 years ago
- Inaugurated: 23 January 2011; 15 years ago
- Cost: US$1.5 billion AED 5.5 billion
- Owner: Emaar Properties

Height
- Architectural: 828 m (2,717 ft)
- Tip: 829.8 m (2,722 ft)
- Antenna spire: 242.5 m (796 ft)
- Roof: 739.4 m (2,426 ft)
- Top floor: 585.4 m (1,921 ft)
- Observatory: 555.7 m (1,823 ft)

Technical details
- Structural system: Reinforced concrete, steel, and aluminium
- Floor count: 154 + 9 maintenance
- Floor area: 309,473 m^{2} (3,331,100 sq ft)
- Lifts/elevators: 57 (mall included)

Design and construction
- Architect: Adrian Smith
- Architecture firm: Skidmore, Owings & Merrill
- Structural engineer: Bill Baker
- Main contractor: Samsung C&T; BESIX; Arabtec

Other information
- Parking: 2 subterranean levels
- Public transit: M1 At Burj Khalifa/Dubai Mall

Website
- burjkhalifa.ae

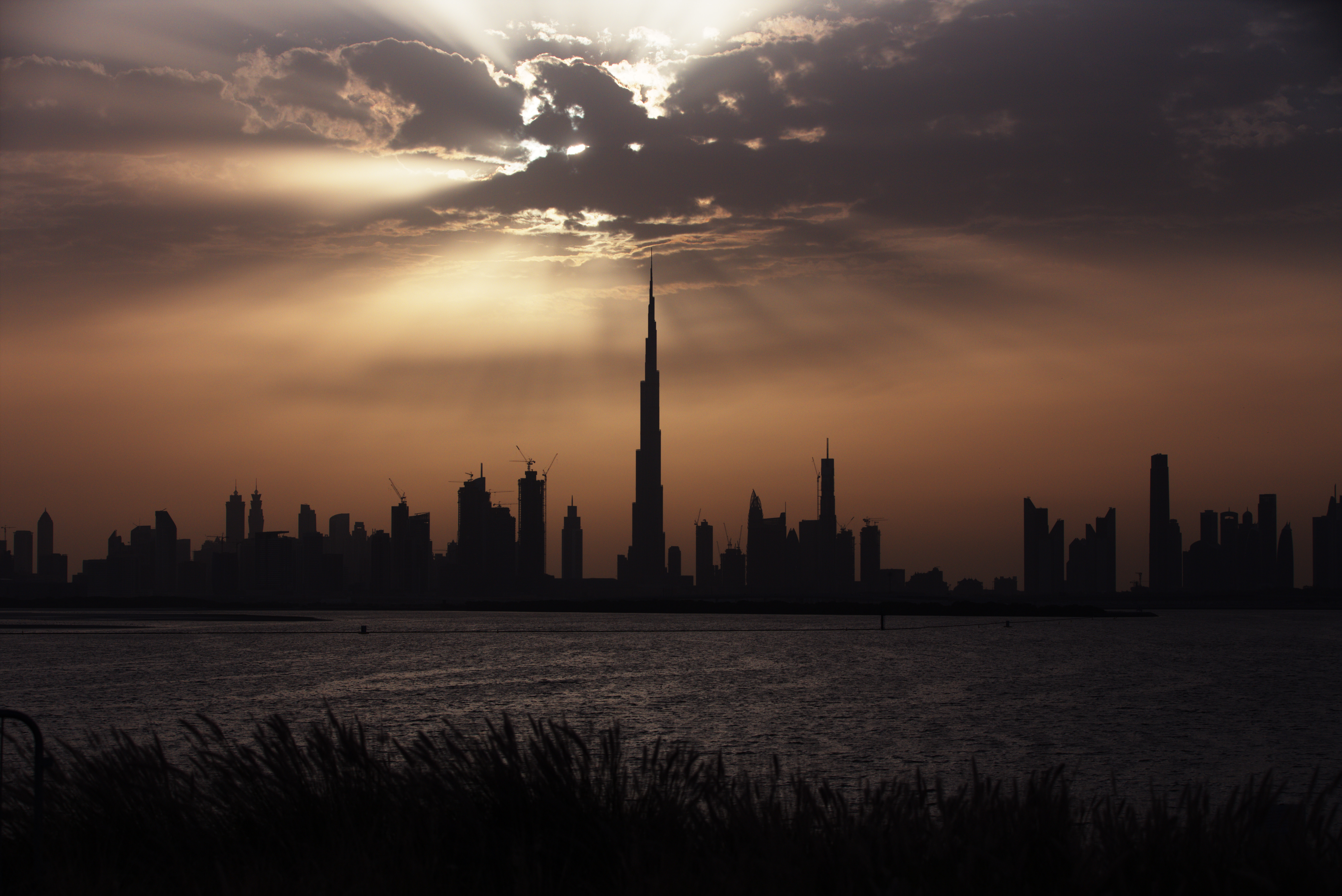
Photographic silhouette of the Dubai skyline; the Burj Khalifa is visible at the centre

The Burj Khalifa (Note: Arabic: بُرْج خَلِيفَة, Burj Khalīfah, pronounced [bʊrd͡ʒ xaˈliːfa], lit. 'Khalifa tower') (previously known as Burj Dubai prior to inauguration) is a megatall skyscraper in Dubai, United Arab Emirates. Designed by Skidmore, Owings & Merrill, it is the world's tallest structure, with a total height of 829.8 m (2,722 ft, or just over half a mile) and a roof height (excluding the antenna, but including a 242.6 m spire) of 828 m (2,717 ft). It has been the tallest building in the world since its complete inauguration in 2011, surpassing Taipei 101, which had held the record since 2004.

Construction of the Burj Khalifa began in 2004; the exterior was completed five years later. The primary structure is reinforced concrete. Some of the structural steel for the building was salvaged from the demolished Palace of the Republic in East Berlin. The building was opened in 2010 as part of a new development called Downtown Dubai. It was designed to be the centrepiece of large-scale, mixed-use development. The building became fully operational with the opening of its last major facility in 2011.

The building is named after the former president of the United Arab Emirates (UAE), Sheikh Khalifa bin Zayed Al Nahyan. The United Arab Emirates government provided Dubai with financial support as the developer, Emaar Properties, experienced financial problems during the Great Recession. Then-president of the United Arab Emirates, Khalifa bin Zayed, organised federal financial support. For his support, Mohammed bin Rashid, Ruler of Dubai, changed the name from "Burj Dubai" to "Burj Khalifa" during inauguration.

The design is derived from the Islamic architecture of the region, such as the Great Mosque of Samarra. The Y-shaped tripartite floor geometry is designed to optimise residential and hotel space. A buttressed central core and wings support the height of the building. Its central core houses all vertical transportation except egress stairs within each of the wings. The structure also features a cladding system which is designed to withstand Dubai's hot summer temperatures. The Burj Khalifa has 57 elevators and 8 escalators.

== Development ==
Construction began on 12 January 2004, with the exterior of the structure completed on 1 October 2009. The building officially opened on 4 January 2010 and is part of the 2 km^{2} (490 acres) Downtown Dubai development at the 'First Interchange' along Sheikh Zayed Road, near Dubai's main business district.

When Burj Khalifa opened in 2010, much of the building was still unfinished internally. The inauguration was effectively completed when the last major planned facility of Burj Khalifa became operational on 23 January 2011, making the tower fully functional.

The tower's architecture and engineering were performed by Skidmore, Owings & Merrill of Chicago, with Adrian Smith as chief architect, and Bill Baker as a chief structural engineer. The firm had designed the Sears Tower in Chicago, a previous record holder for the world's tallest building.

Hyder Consulting was supervising engineer and NORR Group Consultants supervised the architecture. The primary contractor was Samsung C&T of South Korea, together with the Belgian group BESIX and the local company Arabtec.

Numerous complaints concerned migrant workers from South Asia, the primary building labour force, who were paid low wages and sometimes had their passports confiscated.

== Conception ==
Burj Khalifa was designed to be the centrepiece of a large-scale, mixed-use development to include 30,000 homes, nine hotels (including The Address Downtown Dubai), 3 hectares (7.4 acres) of parkland, at least 19 residential skyscrapers, the Dubai Mall, and the 12-hectare (30-acre) artificial Burj Khalifa Lake. The decision to build Burj Khalifa was reportedly based on the government's decision to diversify from an oil-based economy to one that is service and tourism based. According to officials, projects like Burj Khalifa needed to be built to garner more international recognition and hence investment. "He (Sheikh Mohammed bin Rashid Al Maktoum) wanted to put Dubai on the map with something really sensational," said Jacqui Josephson, a tourism and VIP delegations executive at Nakheel Properties.

The tower was known as Burj Dubai ("Dubai Tower") until its official opening in January 2010. It was renamed in honour of the ruler of Abu Dhabi, Khalifa bin Zayed Al Nahyan; Abu Dhabi and the federal government of UAE lent Dubai tens of billions of US dollars so that Dubai could pay its debts – Dubai borrowed at least $80 billion for construction projects. In the 2000s, Dubai started diversifying its economy but it suffered from the 2008 financial crisis and the Great Recession, leaving large-scale projects already in construction abandoned.

== Records ==
The Burj Khalifa set several world records, including:

- Tallest existing structure: 829.8 m (2,722 ft) (previously KVLY-TV mast – 628.8 m or 2,063 ft)
- Tallest structure ever built: 829.8 m (2,722 ft) (previously Warsaw radio mast – 646.38 m or 2,121 ft)
- Tallest freestanding structure: 829.8 m (2,722 ft) (previously CN Tower – 553.3 m or 1,815 ft)
- Tallest skyscraper (to top of spire): 828 m (2,717 ft) (previously Taipei 101 – 509.2 m or 1,671 ft)
- Tallest skyscraper to top of antenna: 829.8 m (2,722 ft) (previously the Willis (formerly Sears) Tower – 527 m or 1,729 ft)
- Building with most floors: 163 (previously World Trade Center – 110)
- World's highest elevator installation (situated inside a rod at the very top of the building)
- World's longest travel distance elevators: 504 m (1,654 ft)
- Highest vertical concrete pumping (for a building): 606 m (1,988 ft)
- World's tallest structure that includes residential space
- World's highest installation of an aluminium and glass façade: 512 m (1,680 ft)
- World's highest restaurant (At.mosphere): 122nd floor at 442 m (1,450 ft) (previously 360, at a height of 350 m (1,148 ft) in CN Tower)
- World's highest New Year display of fireworks.
- World's largest light and sound show staged on a single building.

== Architecture and design ==
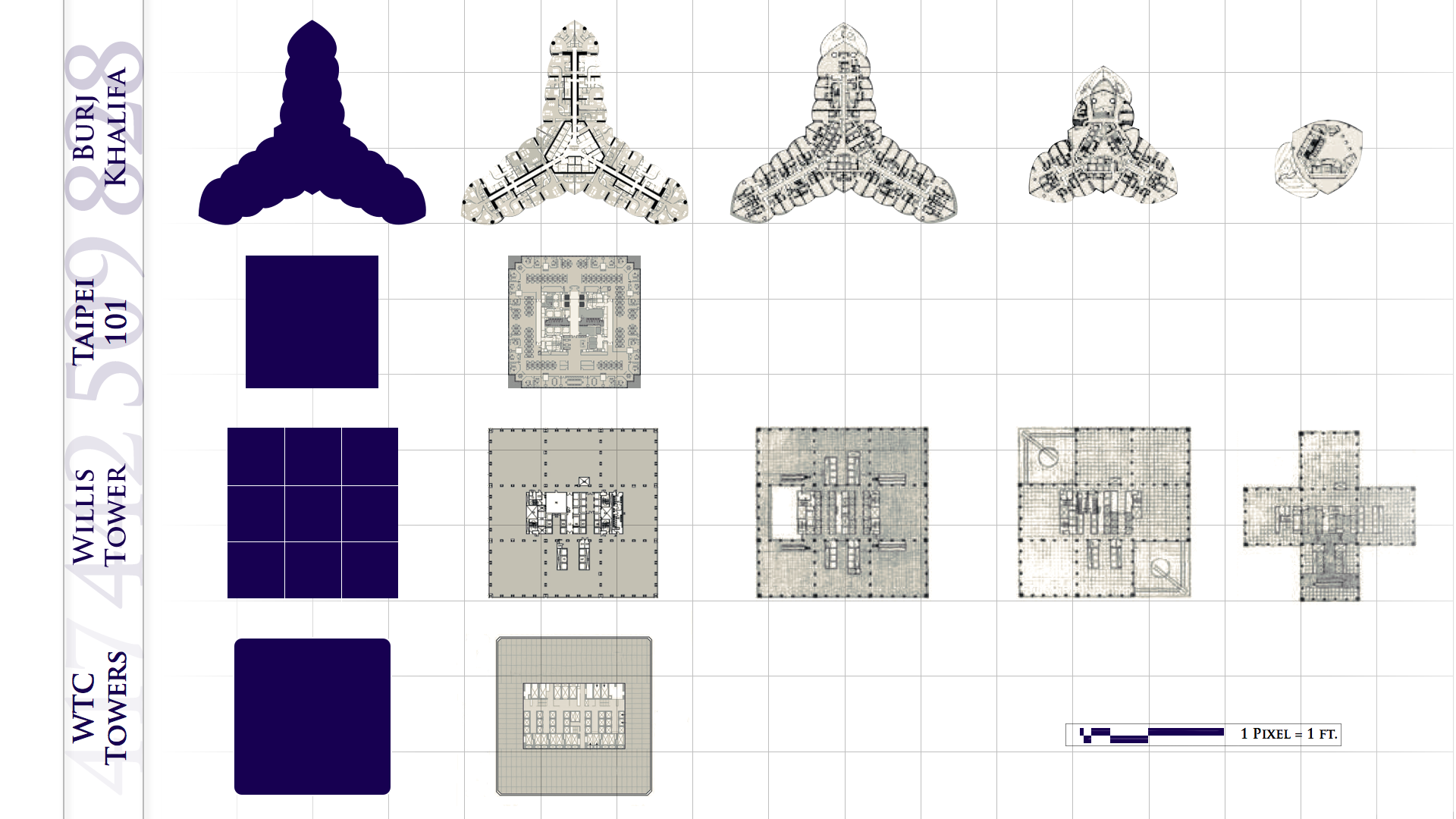
A cross-section of comparisons of various towers, from ground level from top to bottom: Burj Khalifa, Taipei 101, Willis Tower, and the original World Trade Center

The tower was designed by Skidmore, Owings, and Merrill (SOM), which also designed the Willis Tower (formerly the Sears Tower) in Chicago and the One World Trade Center in New York City. Burj Khalifa uses the bundled tube design of the Willis Tower, invented by Fazlur Rahman Khan. Due to its tubular system, proportionally only half the amount of steel was used in the construction, compared to the Empire State Building. Khan's contributions to the design of tall buildings have had a profound impact on architecture and engineering. It would be difficult to find any worldwide practices in the design of tall buildings that have not been directly or indirectly influenced by his work. The design is reminiscent of Frank Lloyd Wright's vision for The Illinois, a mile-high skyscraper designed for Chicago, as well as Chicago's Lake Point Tower. When Adrian Smith was conceiving the project at SOM, he looked out his office window toward Lake Point Tower's curved three-wing layout and thought, "There's the prototype". According to Strabala, Burj Khalifa was designed based on the 73 floor Tower Palace Three, an all-residential building in Seoul. In its early planning, Burj Khalifa was intended to be entirely residential.

After the original design by Skidmore, Owings, and Merrill, Emaar Properties chose Hyder Consulting to be the supervising engineer and NORR Group Consultants International Ltd to supervise the architecture of the project. Hyder was selected for their expertise in structural and MEP (mechanical, electrical and plumbing) engineering. Hyder Consulting's role was to supervise construction, certify the architect's design, and be the engineer and architect of record to the UAE authorities. NORR's role was the supervision of all architectural components including on-site supervision during the construction and design of a 6-storey addition to the office annex building for architectural documentation. NORR was also responsible for the architectural integration drawings for the Armani Hotel included in the Tower. Emaar Properties also engaged GHD, an international multidisciplinary consulting firm, to act as an independent verification and testing authority for concrete and steelwork.

The design is derived from Islamic architecture. As the tower rises from the flat desert base, there are 27 setbacks in a spiral pattern, decreasing the cross-section of the tower as it rises and creating convenient outdoor terraces. These setbacks are arranged and aligned in a way that minimises vibration wind loading from eddy currents and vortices. At the top, the central core emerges and is sculpted to form a finishing spire. At its tallest point, the tower sways a total of 1.5 m (4.9 ft).

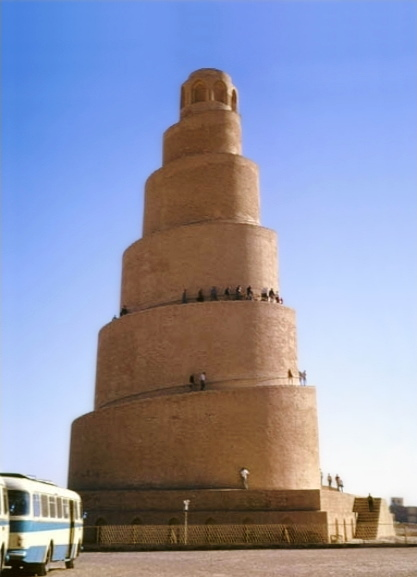
The spiral minaret at the Great Mosque of Samarra

The spire of Burj Khalifa is composed of more than 4,000 tonnes (4,400 short tons; 3,900 long tons) of structural steel. The central pinnacle pipe weighs 350 tonnes (390 short tons; 340 long tons) and has a height of 200 m (660 ft). The spire also houses communications equipment. This 244-metre (801 ft) spire is widely considered vanity height, since very little of its space is usable. Without the spire, Burj Khalifa would be 585 metres (1,919 ft) tall. This was reported in a Council on Tall Buildings and Urban Habitat study, which notes that the empty spire "could be a skyscraper on its own". Such a skyscraper, if located in Europe, would be the 11th tallest building on that continent.

In 2009 architects announced that more than 1,000 pieces of art would adorn the interiors of Burj Khalifa, while the residential lobby of Burj Khalifa would display the work of Jaume Plensa.

The cladding system consists of 142,000 m^{2} (1,528,000 sq ft) of more than 26,000 reflective glass panels and aluminium and textured stainless steel spandrel panels with vertical tubular fins. The architectural glass provides solar and thermal performance as well as an anti-glare shield for the intense desert sun, extreme desert temperatures and strong winds. The glass covers more than 174,000 m^{2} (1,870,000 sq ft) in area. The Burj's typical curtain wall panels measure 4 ft 6 in (1.4 m) wide by 10 ft 8 in (3.3 m) high and weigh about 800 pounds (360 kg) each, with wider panels near the building's edges and taller ones near the top.

The exterior temperature at the top of the building is thought to be 6 °C (11 °F) cooler than at its base.

A 304-room Armani Hotel, the first of 4 by Armani, occupies 15 of the lower 39 floors. The hotel was supposed to open on 18 March 2010, but after several delays, it finally opened to the public on 27 April 2010. The corporate suites and offices were also supposed to open from March onwards, yet the hotel and observation deck remained the only parts of the building which were open in April 2010.

The sky lobbies on the 43rd and 76th floors house swimming pools. Floors 20 through 108 have 900 private residential apartments (which, according to the developer, sold out within eight hours of being on the market). An outdoor zero-entry swimming pool is located on the 76th floor of the tower. Corporate offices and suites fill most of the remaining floors, except for the 122nd, 123rd, and 124th, where the At.mosphere restaurant, sky lobby, and an indoor and outdoor observation deck are located respectively. In January 2010, it was planned that Burj Khalifa would receive its first residents in February 2010.

The building has 57 elevators and 8 escalators. The elevators have a capacity of 12 to 14 people per cabin, and include the world's fastest double-deck elevators, rising and descending at up to 10 m/s (33 ft/s). Engineers initially considered installing the world's first triple-deck elevators. The double-deckers are equipped with LCD displays to amuse visitors during their travel to the observation deck. The building has 2,909 stairs from the ground floor to the 160th floor.

=== Plumbing systems ===
The Burj Khalifa's water system supplies an average of 946,000 L (250,000 U.S. gal) of water per day through 100 km (62 mi) of pipes. An additional 213 km (132 mi) of piping serves the fire emergency system, and 34 km (21 mi) supplies chilled water for the air conditioning system.

=== Air conditioning ===
The air conditioning system draws air from the upper floors where the air is cooler and cleaner than on the ground. At peak cooling times, the tower's cooling is 46 MW (62,000 hp), equivalent to that provided by 13,000 short tons (26,000,000 lb; 12,000,000 kg) of melting ice in one day. Water is collected via a condensate collection system and is used to irrigate the nearby park.

=== Window cleaning ===
To wash the 24,348 windows, totalling 120,000 m^{2} (1,290,000 ft^{2}) of glass, the building has three horizontal tracks, each holding a 1,500 kg (3,300 lb) bucket machine. Above level 109, and up to tier 27, traditional cradles from davits are used. The top of the building is cleaned by a crew that uses ropes to descend from the top to gain access. Under normal conditions, when all building maintenance units are operational, it takes 36 workers three to four months to clean the entire exterior.

Unmanned machines clean the top 27 additional tiers and the glass spire. The cleaning system was developed in Melbourne, Australia, by CoxGomyl, a manufacturer of building maintenance units, at a cost of A$8 million.

== Features ==
=== Fountain ===
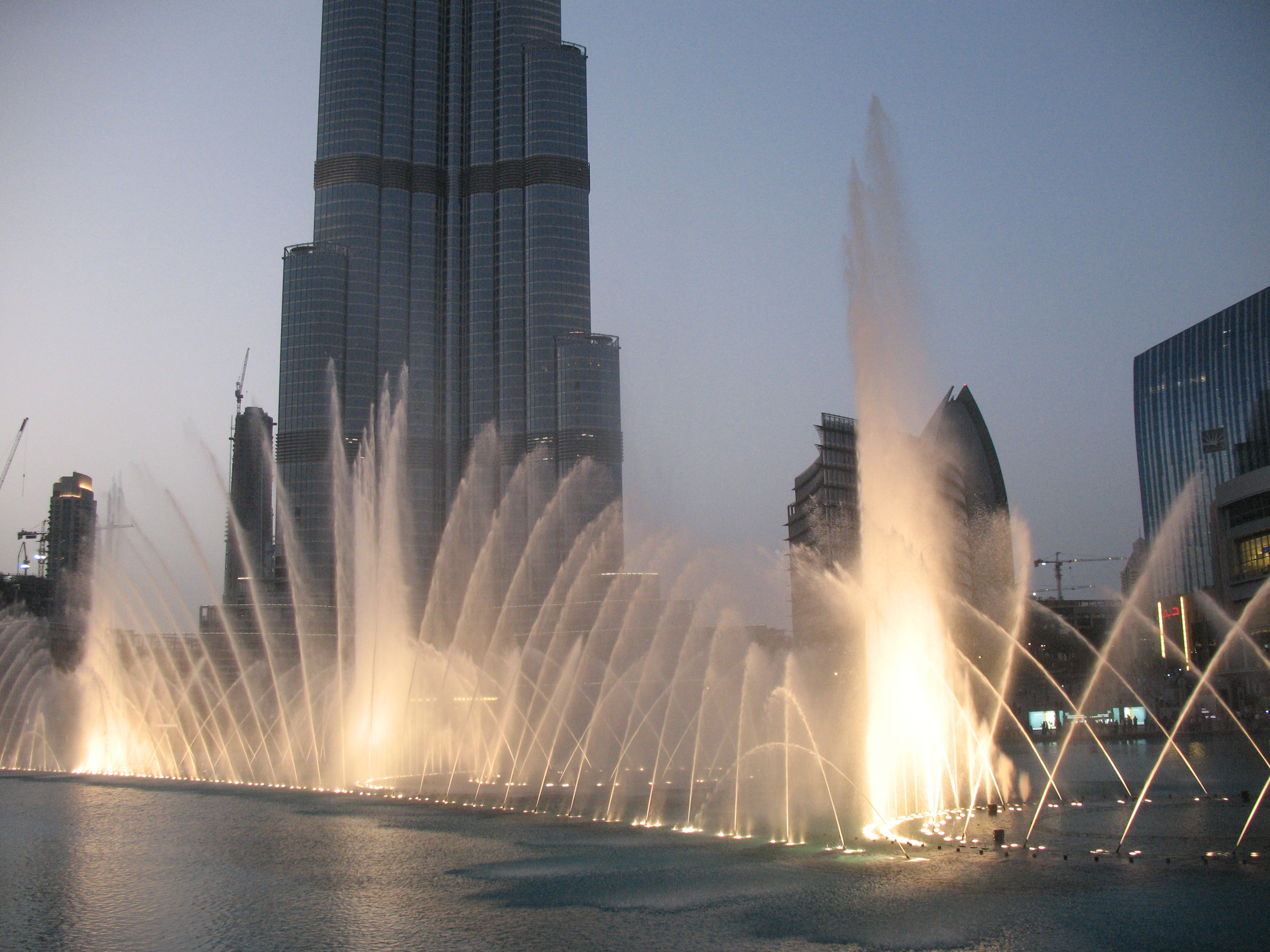
The Dubai Fountain

Outside the Burj Khalifa, WET Enterprises designed a fountain system at a cost of Dh 800 million (US$217 million). Illuminated by 6,600 lights and 50 coloured projectors, it is 270 m (900 ft) long and shoots water 150 m (500 ft) into the air while accompanied by a range of classical to contemporary Arabic and other music. It is the world's largest choreographed fountain. On 26 October 2008, Emaar announced that based on results of a naming contest the fountain would be called the Dubai Fountain.

=== Observation deck ===
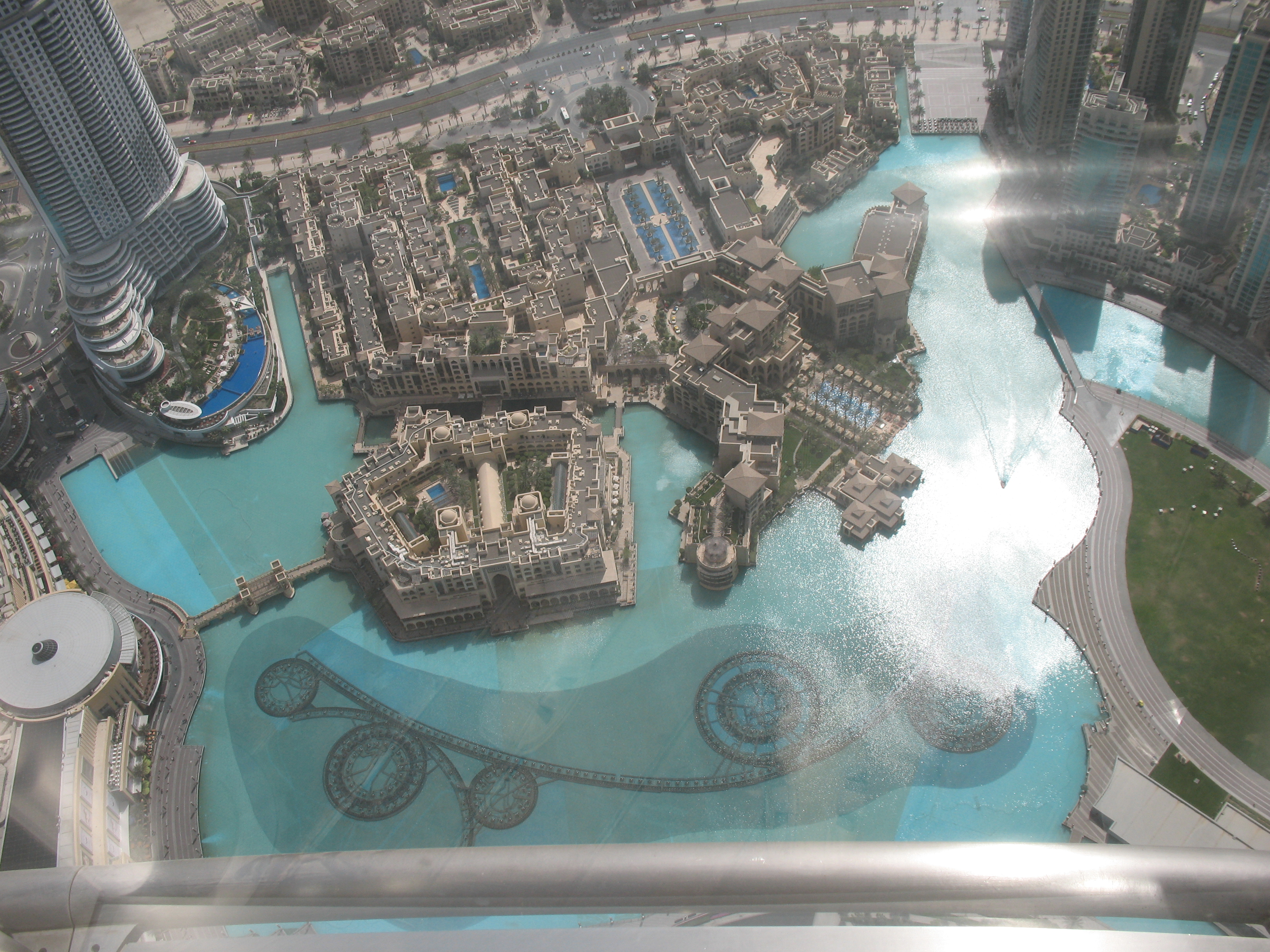
View of The Dubai Fountain from the observation deck

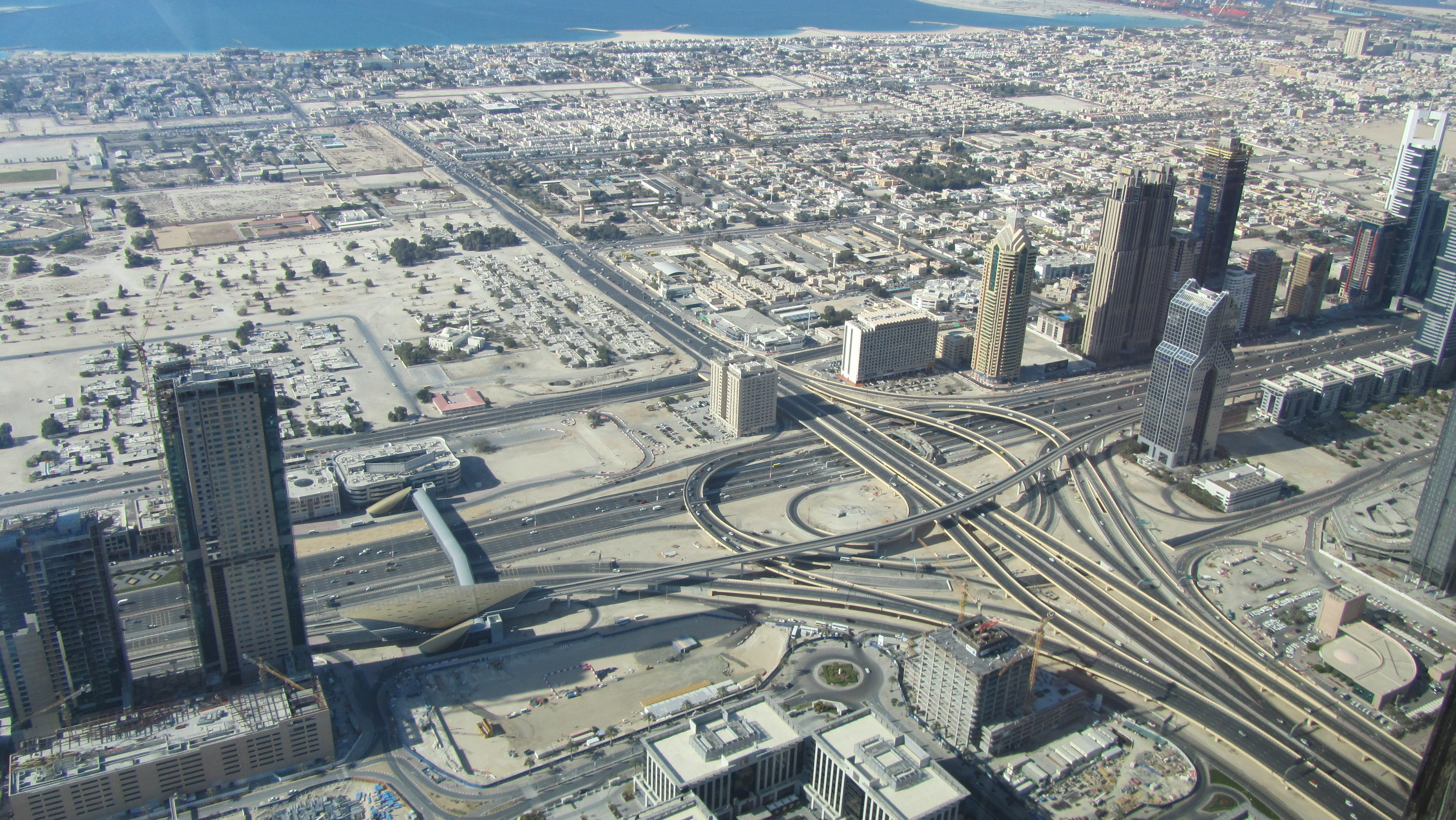
View from the observation deck

An outdoor observation deck, named At the Top, opened on 5 January 2010 on the 124th floor, at 452 m (1,483 ft). It opened the 148th floor SKY level at 555 m (1,821 ft), giving it the highest observation deck in the world on 15 October 2014. However, in June 2016 the Shanghai Tower opened with an observation deck at a height of 561 metres, thus taking the title of the world's highest observation deck. Subsequently, the Burj Khalifa reclaimed the record on February 18, 2019, when it opened The Lounge observatory at 585 m (1,919 ft), which is also the highest lounge in the world.

The Burj Khalifa's 124th floor observation deck also features a so-called electronic telescope, an augmented reality device developed by Gsmprjct° of Montréal, which allows visitors to view the surrounding landscape in real-time, and to view previously saved images such as those taken at different times of day or under different weather conditions. To reduce the daily rush of sightseers, management allows visitors to purchase tickets in advance for a specific date and time, at a 75% discount on tickets purchased on the spot.

On 8 February 2010, the observation deck was closed to the public for two months after power-supply problems caused an elevator to become stuck between floors, trapping a group of tourists for 45 minutes.

When the tide is low and visibility is high, people can see the shores of Iran (which is around 153 km or 95 mi away) from the top of the skyscraper.

=== Park ===
Burj Khalifa is surrounded by an eleven-hectare (27-acre) park designed by landscape architects SWA Group. Like the tower, the park's design was based on the flower of the Hymenocallis, a desert plant. At the centre of the park is the water room, which is a series of pools and water jet fountains. Benches and signs incorporate images of Burj Khalifa and the Hymenocallis flower.

The plants are watered by water collected from the building's cooling system. The system provides 68,000,000 L (18,000,000 US gal) annually. WET Enterprises, who also developed the Dubai Fountain, developed the park's six water features.

== Floor plan ==
Floors	Purpose	Dimetric projection with floors colour-coded by function
160–163	Mechanical	
156–159	Communication and broadcast	
155	Mechanical	
152–154	The Lounge observatory	
149–151	Corporate suites	
148	At the Top Sky observatory	
139–147	Corporate suites	
136–138	Mechanical	
126–135	Corporate suites	
124–125	At the Top observatory	
123	Sky lobby	
122	At.mosphere restaurant	
112–121	Corporate suites	
109–111	Mechanical	
77–108	Residential	
76	Sky lobby	
73–75	Mechanical	
44–72	Residential	
43	Sky lobby	
40–42	Mechanical	
38–39	Armani Hotel suites	
19–37	Residential	
17–18	Mechanical	
9–16	Armani Residences	
1–8	Armani Hotel	
Ground	Armani Hotel, Lobby	
Concourse	Armani Hotel, Lobby	
B1–B2	Parking, Mechanical	

== Ramadan observance ==
On the higher floors, the sun is seen for several minutes after it has set at ground level. Those living above the 80th floor wait two extra minutes to break their Ramadan fast, and those living above the 150th floor wait three minutes.

== Construction ==
Animation of construction process

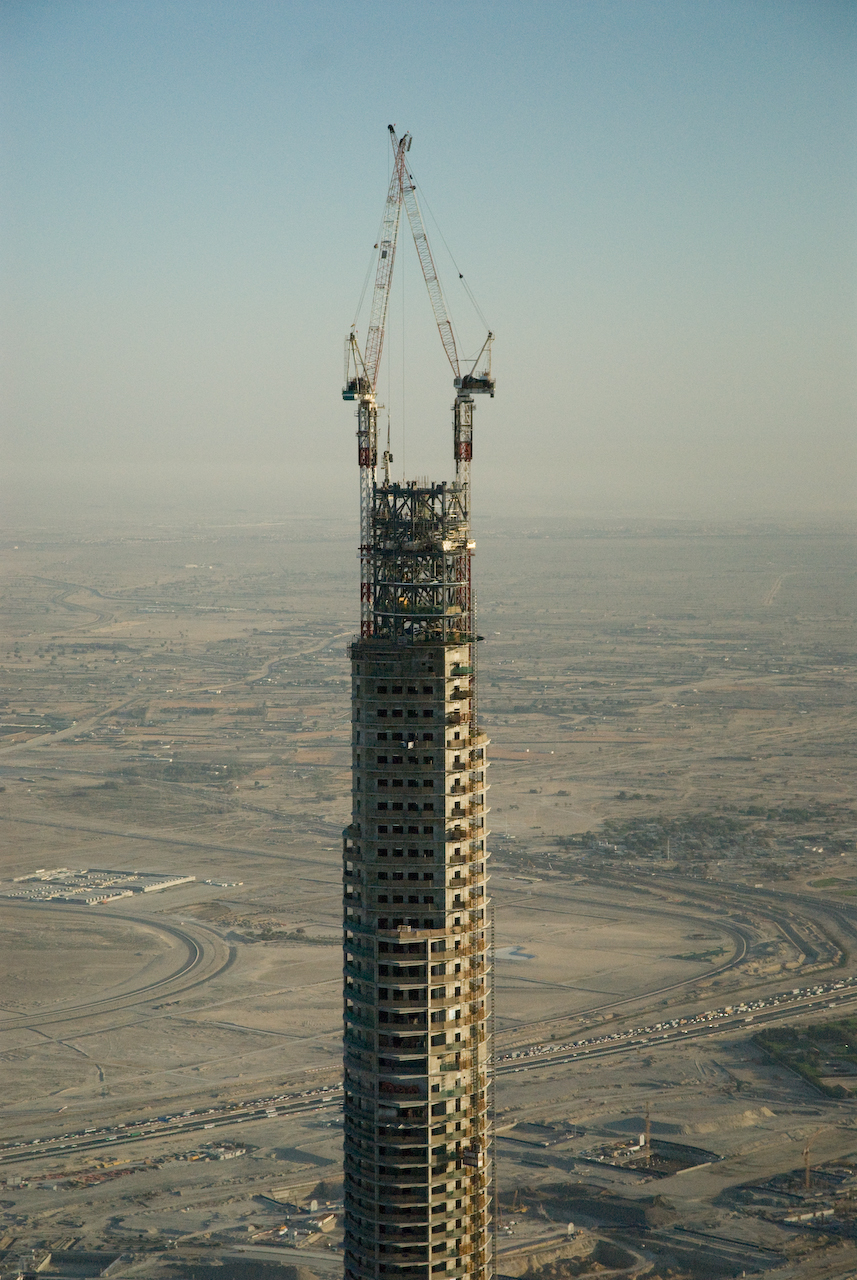
Aerial closeup of Burj Khalifa under construction in March 2008

The tower was constructed by Samsung C&T from South Korea, which also did work on the Petronas Twin Towers and Taipei 101. Samsung C&T built the tower in a joint venture with BESIX from Belgium and Arabtec from the UAE. Turner was the project manager on the main construction contract. Hong Kong-based Far East Aluminium combined to provide the exterior cladding for Burj Khalifa.

The contractor and the engineer of record was Hyder Consulting. Under UAE law, the contractor and the engineer of record is jointly and severally liable for the performance of Burj Khalifa.

The primary structure is reinforced concrete. Putzmeister created a new, super high-pressure trailer concrete pump, the BSA 14000 SHP-D, for this project. Burj Khalifa's construction used 330,000 m^{3} (431,600 cu yd) of concrete and 55,000 tonnes (61,000 short tons; 54,000 long tons) of steel rebar, and construction took 22 million man-hours. In May 2008 Putzmeister pumped concrete with more than 21 MPA ultimate compressive strength of gravel to surpass the 600 metres weight of the effective area of each column from the foundation to the next 4th level, and the rest was by metal columns jacketed or covered with concrete to a then world record delivery height of 606 m (1,988 ft), the 156th floor. Three tower cranes were used during the construction of the uppermost levels, each capable of lifting a 25-tonne load. The remaining structure above was constructed of lighter steel.

In 2003, 33 test holes were drilled to study the strength of the bedrock underlying the structure. "Weak to very weak sandstone and siltstone" was found, just metres below the surface. Samples were taken from test holes drilled to a depth of 140 metres, finding weak to very weak rock all the way. The study described the site as part of a "seismically active area". Another challenging element was the shamal which often creates sandstorms.

Over 45,000 m^{3} (58,900 cu yd) of concrete, weighing more than 110,000 tonnes (120,000 short tons; 110,000 long tons) were used to construct the concrete and steel foundation, which features 192 piles; each pile is 1.5 metre in diameter by 43 m in length, buried more than 50 m (164 ft) deep. The foundation was designed to support the total building weight of approximately 450,000 tonnes (500,000 short tons; 440,000 long tons). This weight was then divided by the compressive strength of concrete which is 30 MPa which yielded 450 sq. metres of vertical normal effective area, which then yielded 12 metres by 12 metres dimensions. A cathodic protection system is under the concrete to neutralise the sulphate and chloride-rich groundwater and prevent corrosion.

During the construction of the Burj Khalifa, over 35,000 tonnes of structural steel was obtained from the Palace of the Republic in Berlin, which had served as the parliament building for the Volkskammer of the former East Germany. The steel was shipped to Dubai after the Palace's demolition was completed in 2008.

The Burj Khalifa is highly compartmentalised. Pressurised, air-conditioned refuge floors are located every 13 floors (on floors G, 13, 26, 39, 52, etc.) where people can shelter on their long walk down to safety in case of an emergency or fire.

Special mixes of concrete were made to withstand the extreme pressures of the massive building weight; as is typical with reinforced concrete construction, each batch of concrete was tested to ensure it could withstand certain pressures. CTLGroup, working for Skidmore, Owings and Merrill, conducted the creep and shrinkage testing critical for the structural analysis of the building.

The consistency of the concrete used in the project was essential. It was difficult to create a concrete that could withstand both the thousands of tonnes bearing down on it and Persian Gulf temperatures that can reach 50 °C (122 °F). To combat this problem, the concrete was not poured during the day. Instead, during the summer months, ice was added to the mixture and it was poured at night when the air was cooler and the humidity was higher. Cooler concrete cures more evenly and is, therefore, less likely to set too quickly and crack. Any significant cracks could have put the entire project in jeopardy.

=== Milestones ===
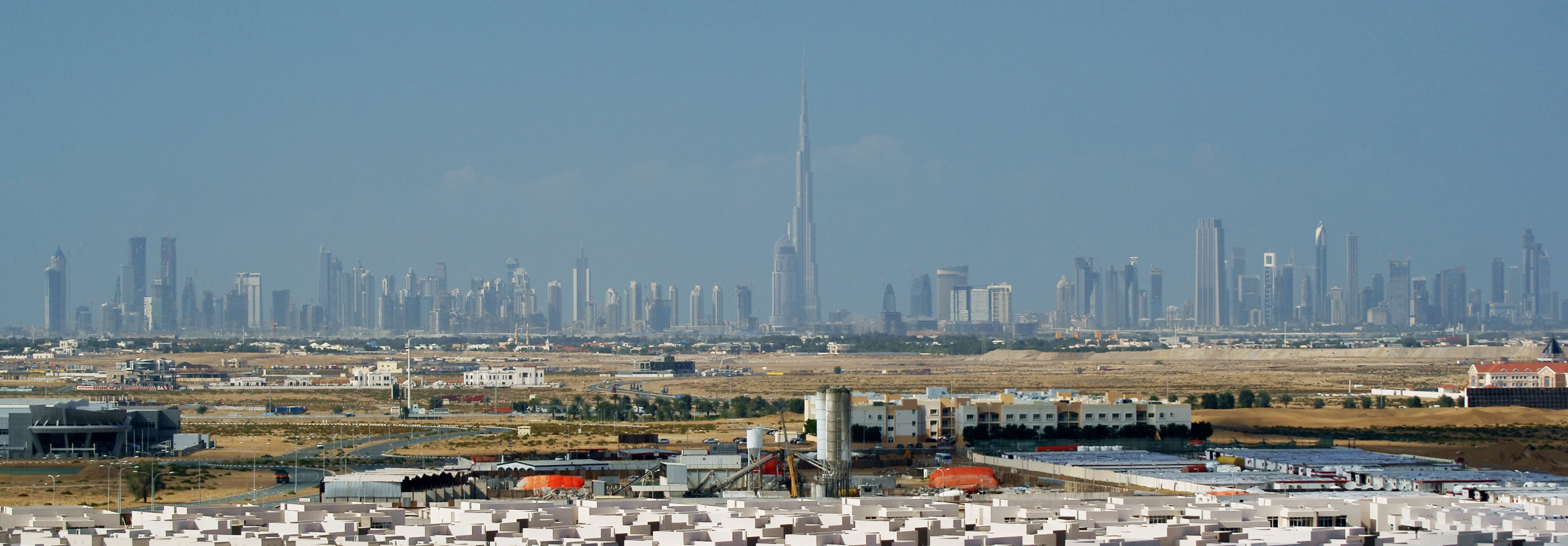
Burj Khalifa and skyline of Dubai, 2010

- January 2004: Excavation commences.
- February 2004: Piling starts.
- 21 September 2004: Emaar contractors begin construction.
- March 2005: Structure of Burj Khalifa starts rising.
- June 2006: Level 50 is reached.
- February 2007: Surpasses the Sears Tower as the building with the most floors.
- 13 May 2007: Sets record for vertical concrete pumping on any building at 452 m (1,483 ft), surpassing the 449.2 m (1,474 ft) to which concrete was pumped during the construction of Taipei 101, while Burj Khalifa reached the 130th floor.
- 21 July 2007: Surpasses Taipei 101, whose height of 509.2 m (1,671 ft) made it the world's tallest building, and level 141 reached.
- 12 August 2007: Surpasses the Sears Tower antenna, which stands 527 m (1,729 ft).
- 12 September 2007: At 555.3 m (1,822 ft), becomes the world's tallest freestanding structure, surpassing the CN Tower in Toronto, and level 150 reached.
- 7 April 2008: At 629 m (2,064 ft), surpasses the KVLY-TV Mast to become the tallest human-made structure, level 160 reached.
- 17 June 2008: Emaar announces that Burj Khalifa's height is over 636 m (2,087 ft) and that its final height will not be given until it is completed in September 2009.
- 1 September 2008: Height tops 688 m (2,257 ft), making it the tallest human-made structure ever built, surpassing the previous record-holder, the Warsaw Radio Mast in Konstantynów, Poland.
- 17 January 2009: Topped out at 829.8 m (2,722 ft).
- 1 October 2009: Emaar announces that the exterior of the building is completed.
- 4 January 2010: Burj Khalifa's official launch ceremony is held and Burj Khalifa is opened. Burj Dubai was renamed Burj Khalifa in honour of the President of the UAE and ruler of Abu Dhabi, Sheikh Khalifa bin Zayed al Nahyan.
- 10 March 2010: Council on Tall Buildings and Urban Habitat certifies Burj Khalifa as world's tallest building.

=== Real estate values ===
In March 2009, Mohamed Ali Alabbar, chairman of the project's developer, Emaar Properties, said office space pricing at Burj Khalifa reached US$4,000 per sq ft (over US$43,000 per m^{2}) and the Armani Residences, also in Burj Khalifa, sold for US$3,500 per sq ft (over US$37,500 per m^{2}). He estimated the total cost for the project to be about US$1.5 billion.

The project's completion coincided with the Great Recession, and with vast overbuilding in the country, leading to high vacancies and foreclosures. With Dubai mired in debt from its huge ambitions, the government was forced to seek multibillion-dollar bailouts from its oil-rich neighbour Abu Dhabi. Subsequently, in a surprise move at its opening ceremony, the tower was renamed Burj Khalifa, said to honour the UAE President Khalifa bin Zayed Al Nahyan for his crucial support.

Because of the slumping demand in Dubai's property market, the rents in the Burj Khalifa plummeted 40% some ten months after its opening. Out of 900 apartments in the tower, 825 were still empty at that time. Over the next 30 months, overseas investors steadily bought up available apartments and office space. By October 2012, Emaar reported that around 80% of the apartments were occupied.

=== Official launch ceremony ===
The opening ceremony of Burj Khalifa

The ceremony was broadcast live on a giant screen on Burj Park Island and on smaller screens elsewhere. Hundreds of media outlets from around the world reported live from the scene. In addition to the media presence, 6,000 guests were expected.

The opening was held on 4 January 2010. The ceremony featured a display of 10,000 fireworks, light beams projected on and around the tower, and further sound, light and water effects. The celebratory lighting was designed by UK lighting designers Speirs and Major Associates. Using the 868 powerful stroboscope lights that are integrated into the façade and spire of the tower, different lighting sequences were choreographed, together with more than 50 different combinations of other effects.

== Controversies ==
=== Incidents ===
On 10 May 2011, an Asian migrant worker in his mid-30s jumped to his death from the 147th floor onto the 108th floor's deck. Dubai police said he killed himself because his company refused to let him leave the country.

On 16 November 2014, Portuguese citizen Laura Vanessa Nunes died by suicide after falling to her death from the observation deck on the 148th floor. This was confirmed by internal Portuguese embassy communications later obtained by Nine News under freedom of information laws. A subsequent coroner's report issued by the Government of Dubai recorded that her body was recovered from a balcony on the third floor of the building. Dubai Police disputed that the incident had occurred at the building and instead claimed that she had fallen from the Jumeirah Lake Towers.

=== Labour ===
The Burj Khalifa was built primarily by workers from South Asia and East Asia. This is generally because the current generation of UAE locals prefer governmental jobs and do not have an attitude favouring private sector employment. On 17 June 2008, there were about 7,500 skilled workers employed at the construction site. Press reports indicated in 2006 that skilled carpenters at the site earned £4.34 a day, and labourers earned £2.84. According to a BBC investigation and a Human Rights Watch report, the workers were housed in abysmal conditions, and worked long hours for low pay. During construction, one construction-related death was reported. Workplace injuries and deaths in the UAE are poorly documented, according to Human Rights Watch.

In March 2006 about 2,500 workers, upset over buses that were delayed for the end of their shifts, protested and triggered a riot, damaging cars, offices, computers, and construction equipment. A Dubai Interior Ministry official said the rioters caused almost £500,000 in damage. Most of the workers involved in the riot returned the following day but refused to work.

== New Year's Eve ==
Emaar New Year's Eve is an annual event held every 31 December at Burj Khalifa, organised by Emaar Properties. The event consists of fireworks launched from Burj Khalifa, a light and laser show on the facade of Burj Khalifa, and an accompanying soundtrack and a special fountain show on The Dubai Fountain choreographed to the soundtrack. The Emaar New Year's Eve fireworks celebration originated in 2010 with the inauguration of the world's tallest building, Burj Khalifa. The celebration was broadcast live to more than 2 million people and lasted for 3 minutes.

Since 2011, national live broadcasting rights have been held by Dubai Media Incorporated and Dubai TV.

Emaar New Year's Eve has won two Guinness World Records, including "Largest LED-Illuminated Facade" in 2015 and 2019.

In 2017 and 2018, Emaar New Year's Eve was broadcast live on Twitter, and YouTube. In 2020, it was broadcast live for the first time on Zoom.

In 2021, Emaar celebrated solidarity in honour of frontline workers of the COVID-19 pandemic.

For the 2022 event, a laser feature was installed on The Dubai Fountain in sync with the Burj Khalifa's laser and fireworks show.

== BASE jumping ==
The building has been used by several experienced BASE jumpers for authorised and unauthorised BASE jumping:

In May 2008, Hervé Le Gallou and David McDonnell, dressed as engineers, entered Burj Khalifa (around 650 metres (2,130 ft) at the time), and jumped off a balcony situated several floors below the 160th floor.

On 8 January 2010, with permission of the authorities, Nasr Al Niyadi and Omar Al Hegelan, from the Emirates Aviation Society, broke the world record for the highest BASE jump from a building after they leapt from a crane-suspended platform attached to the 160th floor at 672 m (2,205 ft). The two men descended the vertical drop at a speed of up to 220 km/h (140 mph), with enough time to open their parachutes 10 seconds into the 90-second jump.

On 21 April 2014, with permission of the authorities and support from several sponsors, highly experienced French BASE jumpers Vince Reffet and Fred Fugen broke the Guinness world record for the highest BASE jump from a building after they leapt from a specially designed platform, built at the very top of the pinnacle, at 828 metres (2,717 feet).

== Climbing ==
On 28 March 2011, Alain "Spiderman" Robert scaled the outside of Burj Khalifa. The climb to the top of the spire took 6 hours. To comply with UAE safety laws, Robert, who usually climbs in free solo style, used a rope and harness.

== Awards ==
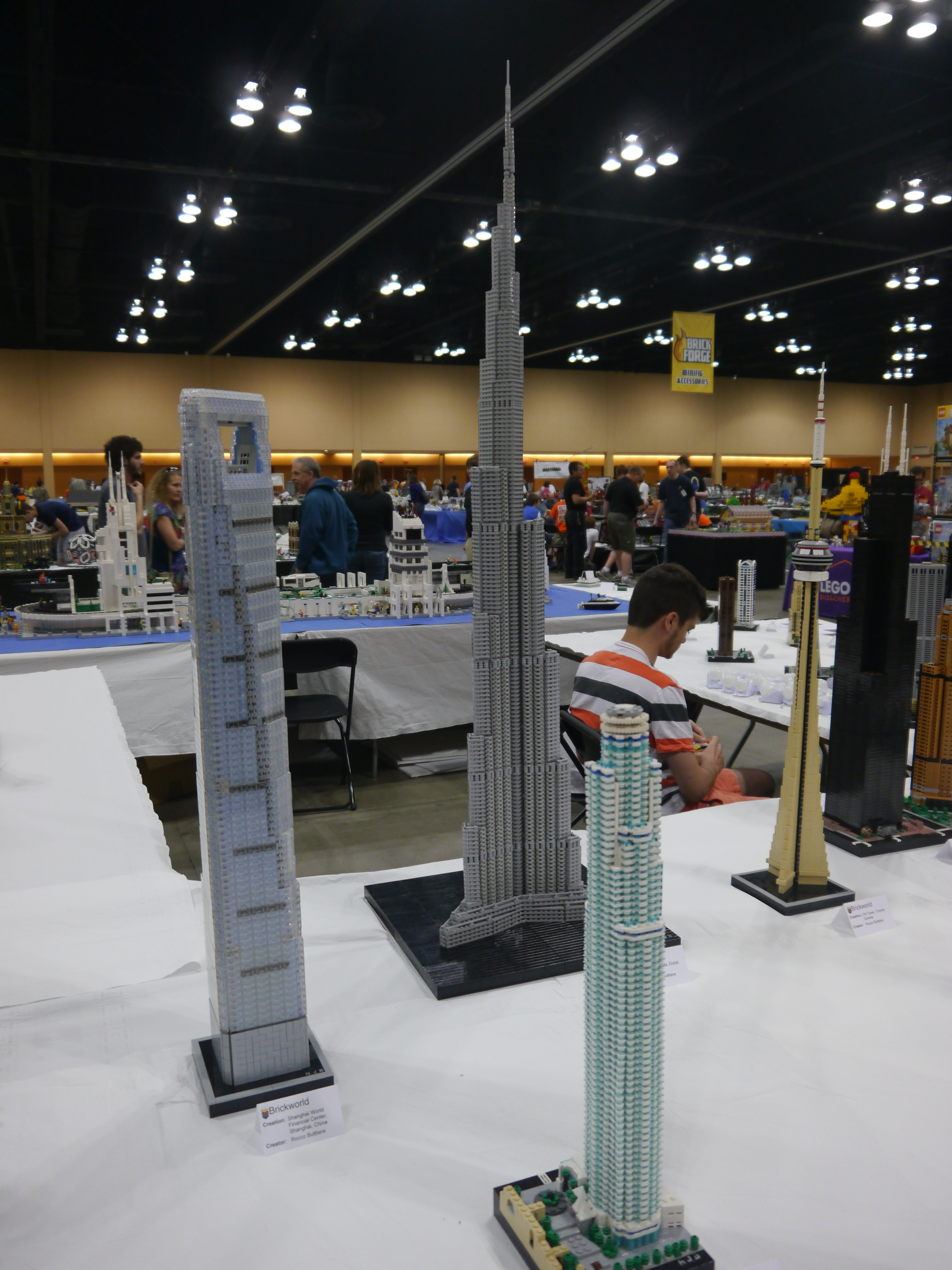
Burj Khalifa artwork project made of Lego in Bricksworld 2014

In June 2010, Burj Khalifa was the recipient of the 2010 "Best Tall Building Middle East & Africa" award by the Council on Tall Buildings and Urban Habitat. On 28 September 2010 Burj Khalifa won the award for the best project of the year at the Middle East Architect Awards 2010. Awards Chair Gordon Gill, of Adrian Smith + Gordon Gill Architecture, said:

We are talking about a building here that has changed the landscape of what is possible in architecture – a building that became internationally recognized as an icon long before it was even completed. 'Building of the Century' was thought a more apt title for it.

Burj Khalifa was also the recipient of the following awards.

Year	Award
2012	Award of Merit for World Voices Sculpture, Burj Khalifa Lobby from Structural Engineers Association of Illinois (SEAOI), Chicago.
2011	Interior Architecture Award, Certificate of Merit from AIA – Chicago Chapter.
2011	Distinguished Building Award, Citation of Merit from AIA – Chicago Chapter.
2011	Interior Architecture Award: Special Recognition from AIA – Chicago Chapter.
2011	Design Excellence Award: Special Function Room.
2011	Excellence in Engineering from ASHRAE (American Society of Heating, Refrigerating, and Air-Conditioning Engineers) – Illinois Chapter.
2011	Outstanding Structure Award from International Association for Bridge and Structural Engineering.
2011	Decade of Design, Presidential Commendation in Corporate Space Small from International Interior Design Association (IIDA).
2011	Decade of Design • Best of Category/Mixed Use Buildings from International Interior Design Association (IIDA).
2011	GCC Technical Building Project of the Year from MEED (formerly Middle East Economic Digest).
2011	Project of the Year from MEED.
2010	International Architecture Award.
2010	Arab Achievement Award 2010: Best Architecture Project from Arab Investment Summit.
2010	Architecture Award (Mixed Use) Dubai from Arabian Property Awards.
2010	Architecture Award (Mixed Use) Arabian Region from Arabian Property Awards.
2010	International Architecture Award from Chicago Athenaeum.
2010	American Architecture Award from Chicago Athenaeum.
2010	Commercial / Mixed Use Built from Cityscape.
2010	Best Mixed Use Built Development in Cityscape Abu Dhabi.
2010	Skyscraper Award: Silver Medal from Emporis.
2010	Award for Commercial or Retail Structure from Institution of Structural Engineers.
2010	International Architecture Award (Mixed Use) from International Commercial Property Awards.
2010	Special Recognition for Technological Advancement from International Highrise Awards.
2010	Best Structural Design of the Year from LEAF Award.
2010	International Projects Category: Outstanding Project from National Council of Structural Engineers Associations.
2010	Best of What's New from Popular Science Magazine.
2010	Spark Awards, Silver Award.
2010	Excellence in Structural Engineering: Most Innovative Structure from SEAOI.

== See also ==
- List of buildings in Dubai
- List of buildings with 100 floors or more
- List of development projects in Dubai
- List of tallest buildings and structures
- List of tallest freestanding structures
- List of tallest buildings in Dubai
- List of tallest buildings in the United Arab Emirates
- List of tallest buildings
- List of tallest structures
- Jeddah Tower

== Notes ==
Records
Preceded by Warsaw Radio Mast; 646.38 m (2,120.67 ft)	World's tallest structure ever built on dry land 2008 – present	Incumbent
Preceded by KVLY-TV mast 628.8 m (2,063 ft)	World's tallest structure on dry land 2008 – present	Incumbent
Preceded by CN Tower; 553.33 m (1,815.39 ft)	World's tallest free-standing structure 2007 – present	Incumbent
Preceded by Taipei 101; 509.2 m (1,670.6 ft)	World's tallest building 2009 – present	Incumbent
Preceded by Willis Tower; 108 floors	Building with the most floors 2007 – present	Incumbent
Preceded by Almas Tower; 360 m (1,180 ft)	Tallest building in Dubai; 2009 – present	Incumbent
