= GSM Project =

Canadian design company

GSM Studios
- type: private company
- foundation: 1958, Montreal, Canada
- founder: Jacques Guillon
- president: Eric Demay
- industry: exhibition design and production
- staff: 50
- divisions: création, intégration, technologie, média
- homepage: www.gsmstudios.world

GSM Studios (previously known as gsmprjct or GSM Project) is an international creative group specialized in the design and production of cultural attractions and exhibitions for museums., including capabilities in strategy and planning, content development, experience and spatial design, technical development, production, project management, and operations and management support.

== History ==
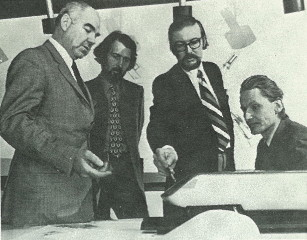
Jacques Guillon, Morley Smith, Laurent Marquart and Roger Labastrou

GSM history can be traced back to Jacques Guillon and Associates, the first multidisciplinary design office in Canada, founded by architect Jacques Guillon in 1958. The firm participated in numerous landmark projects in various fields, including the signage and metro cars for Montreal’s metro system and several thematic pavilions at Expo 67 in Montreal. These projects were realized by the talents of Morley Smith, an American industrial designer in charge of the design of Montreal Metro cars and the Man and Life pavilion at Expo 67, and the Swiss graphic designer, Laurent Marquart. The company rebranded itself Jacques Guillon Designers in 1968.

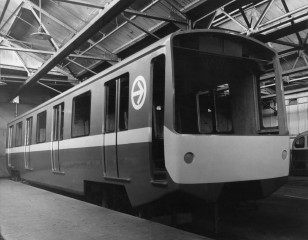
Montreal Metro car in 1967

Together, they added exhibition design to the repertoire of the company. The team was completed by a fourth associate, Roger Labastrou, a Swiss architect in charge of the interior design department.

Renamed Guillon, Smith, Marquart in 1978 as Guillon passed the majority of his shares to Smith and Marquart, then as GSM Design in 1982, the company offered services in visual communications, industrial design, interior design and exhibition design. Having secured his succession, Jacques Guillon retired in 1987.

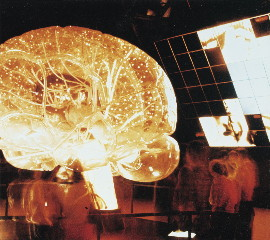
The Man and Life thematic pavilion at Expo 67

After Guillon’s departure Morley Smith and Laurent Marquart divided the company. Morley Smith moved the industrial design department to his own firm, GSM Design, Produits et Transport and Laurent Marquart kept the interior and exhibition design. Laurent continued in 1987 with his two associates, Kathleen Lanni in interior design and Yves Mayrand in exhibition design. The firm, operating at the time under the name GSM Design/Aménagement, communication visuelle et exposition inc., specialized itself and began to deal with an international clientele and competition.

The interior design department of GSM Design built its reputation on its adaptability to cultural realities, allowing it to work on a variety of projects ranging from a Jewish community centre (CJA Federation, 1997–2000), to the Swedish telecommunications company, Ericsson Communications, or the National Bank of Dubai.

Meanwhile, a series of successes in exhibition design, including the invention of the multimedia show for the Louis St-Laurent National Historic Site (1982) and Memories at the Musée de la civilisation de Québec (1988), an exhibition that redefined the visitor’s role as an actor rather than a mere spectator, allowed the exhibition design department of GSM to take flight. In parallel, the company reduced its services in visual communications, limiting itself only to the graphics necessary for their interior design and exhibition design projects.

Starting in 1992, GSM Design began to collaborate with TBY, a company specialized in the management of shows founded by engineer Pierre Royer and lighting designer Vincent Brie, working together to create a multimedia show for Pointe-à-Callière, Montreal’s museum of history and archaeology, in 1992. In 2001, Vincent Brie, Pierre Royer and Yves Mayrand created a new company, M2C1 (for "measure twice, cut once") whose mandate was to oversee the construction and installation of equipment for shows, exhibitions and fairs. In this way, these three companies collaborated on a variety of projects, including the design, manufacture and installation of the City Museum of Washington, D.C. in 2003.

In order to offer their clients specialized turn-key services, GSM Design separated itself from the interior design department in 2002 to become GSM Design Expositions. In 2004, they also created Kleio Systems to develop new technologies related to the field of exhibitions. M2C1 and Kleio Systems were renamed GSM Build and GSM Products respectively, and GSM Media was created in 2005. TBY was subsequently fused to GSM Build. This new group of companies was then capable of offering turn-key solutions, including the design, management, construction, installation and maintenance of exhibitions.

In 2003, GSM Project had no projects in Montreal and 98% of its business was outside of Canada. After completing renovations on the Asian Civilizations Museum in Singapore, GSM Project established an office there and was offered the mandate of creating the new National Museum of Singapore which opened its doors in 2006 and won them several prizes, including the Design Exchange Awards Silver Prize in the Interior Design - Temporary of Portable category in 2007 for the Living Galleries and the Graphex 2008 Prize of Excellence for the Singapore History Gallery.

In 2005, GSM Project obtained a contract to design, install and maintain the observatory, interpretation centre and the multimedia experience inside the elevators of Burj Khalifa, the tallest skyscraper in the world, inaugurated in Dubai in January 2010. In 2007, GSM Project established a representation in Dubai.

In honour of its 50th anniversary, the company renovated its image. Operating since 2008 under the name gsmprjct°, this group has more recently participated in the creation of Espace Montréal at the Universal Exposition in Shanghai that showcases the Saint-Michel environmental complex in Montreal as an example of sustainable urban development.

In September 2022, the corporate entity GSMPRJCT Creation declared bankruptcy. Since then, GSM has reopened under new management and continues to operate in the field as GSM Studios., under the Humanise Collective.

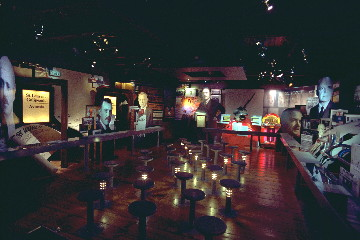
Multimedia room of the Louis St-Laurent National Historic Site

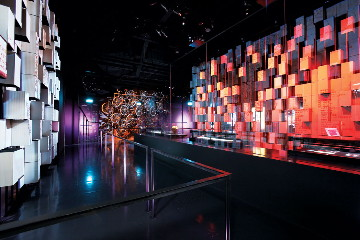
The History Gallery of the National Museum of Singapore

== Landmark projects ==
=== Industrial design ===
- Montreal Metro Cars, 1962
- Taxi GSM, 1975
- LRC Train, Transport Canada, 1977
- "Simms System 2000" Paint roller, T.S. Simms & Co., Ltd., 1979
- "Versatile 1150" Tractor, Versatile Farm Equipment, 1978

=== Visual communications ===
- Signage for the Montreal Metro, 1962
- Mirabel Airport, 1974
- Quebec Provincial Parks Signage, Ministère du Tourisme du Québec, 1979
- Maison du Citoyen (City Hall), Hull, 1984
- Annual report, Ciment St-Laurent, 1987
- Nordair branding, 1984
- Signage for the Sheraton Centre, 1982–1983

=== Interior design ===
- Le Méridien Hotels, Houston, San Francisco, Mexico City, Kuwait, 1985
- National Bank of Dubai, United Arab Emirates, 1992–1998
- Bibliothèque nationale du Québec, Montréal, 1995–1996
- CJA Federation, Montreal, 1997–2000
- du Dubai Headquarters, Dubai, United Arab Emirates, 2007

=== Exhibitions ===
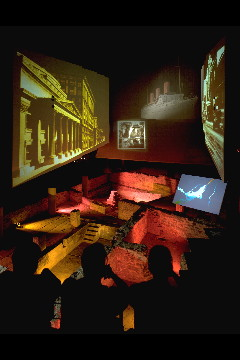
Multimedia show "Si Montréal m'était conté" ("Montreal, Tales of a City") at the Pointe-à-Callière Museum

- Man and Life Thematic Pavilion, Expo '67, Montreal, 1967
- Belgian Pavilion, Expo '67, Montreal, 1967
- Louis St-Laurent National Historic Site, Compton, Canada, 1982
- Canadian Pavilion, Expo '86, Vancouver, Canada, 1986
- Memories, Musée de la civilisation, Québec, Canada, 1988
- Montreal, a Crossroads of Culture and Trade, Pointe-à-Callière Montreal Museum of Archaeology and History, Canada, 1992
- Oceania Virtual Reality Pavilion, Expo '98, Lisbon, Portugal, 1998
- Montreal, Tales of a City, Pointe-à-Callière Montreal Museum of Archaeology and History, Canada, 2000
- Montreal Science Centre (iSci), Old Port of Montreal, Canada, 2000
- The Mysterious Bog People, Travelling Exhibition, 2002
- The Adventure of Electricity, Electropolis: Museum of Electrical Energy in Mulhouse, France, 2001–2003
- City Museum of Washington, D.C., Washington, D.C., USA, 2003
- Asian Civilizations Museum, Singapore, 2003
- National Museum of Singapore, Singapore, 2006
- Musée historique de la ville de Strasbourg, France, 2007
- Passagers/Passengers, Musée de la civilisation, Québec, Canada, 2008
- Indiana Jones and the Adventure of Archaeology, world tour, 2011
- Ajax Experience, Amsterdam, Netherlands, 2011
- Star Wars Identities, world tour, 2012

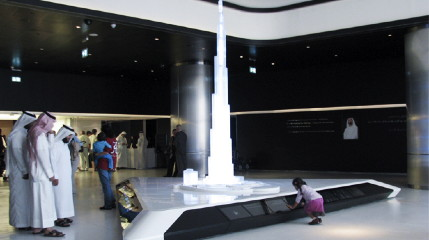
Burj Khalifa Interpretation Centre

== Recent projects ==
- At the Top, Burj Khalifa, Dubai, United Arab Emirates, 2009
- Being Irish O’Quebec, McCord Museum of Canadian History, Montreal, 2009
- Aqua, Travelling Exhibition, One Drop Foundation, Montreal, 2009
- Espace Montréal, Expo 2010, Shanghai, China, 2010
