= Yara International School =

International school in Riyadh, Saudi Arabia

- مدرسة يارا العالمية

- Yara International School, 2024

Location
- King Faisal Road; Imam Mohammad Ibn Saud Islamic University Building, ad-Dirah, Riyadh; Saudi Arabia
- Coordinates: 24°37′44″N 46°43′02″E

Information
- Other names: Al-Yara International School; Yara Public School
- School type: Private day school
- Motto: We want your Kid to be a Star!
- Established: 17 May 2003; 22 years ago
- School board: Central Board of Secondary Education
- Educational authority: Ministry of Education
- Trust: Yara Educational Trust
- Session: April to March
- Chairman: Habeebul Rahman PP
- CEO: Khalid Abdullah Mohammed Aldrees
- Administrator: Abdul Kader Koya
- Principal: Aasima Saleem Yezdani
- Teaching staff: 132
- Grades: K–12
- Gender: Mixed (nursery–kindergarten); Gender-isolated (1–12)
- Age range: 4 to 18
- Enrollment: 2500
- Education system: Indian (since 2003); British (2019–2023)
- Language: English
- Classrooms: 119
- Area: 9,890 square metres (2.44 acres)
- Houses: Emerald; Ruby; Sapphire; Topaz
- Color
- Slogan: Paving the path to excellence...
- Affiliation: CBSE Gulf Sahodaya
- Demonym: Yarian
- Named after: Yara bint Khalid Aldrees
- Website: yaraschool.net

Yara International School (YIS) (Arabic: مدرسة يارا العالمية) is a K–12 private foreign school in the ad-Dirah district of Riyadh, Saudi Arabia, located next to Qasr Al Hokm station in the former campus of the Female Student Study Center of Imam Mohammad Ibn Saud Islamic University. Established in 2003, the school moved to its current campus in 2013. It primarily serves the local Indian diaspora and offers curriculum prescribed by the Central Board of Secondary Education (CBSE) and previously offered British curriculum alongside the Indian one from 2019 to 2023.

== History ==
=== Establishment and early days ===
Yara International School was founded on 17 May 2003 as a community-based international school to serve the Indian diaspora with only 79 students in a private villa in ar-Rabwah neighborhood of Riyadh. The school's name, Yara, was purportedly named after Yara bint Khalid Aldrees, one of the daughters of Khalid Aldrees. In August 2003, Yara held its first ever essay writing and Qur'an recitation competition which was open to all Indian school students on the occasion of India's Independence Day. In 2006, Yara school's principal Aasima Saleem attended the event organized by the Bharatiya International Society for Welfare and Solidarity (BISWAS) in which it honored several prominent Indians for their contributions, like Professor Mohammed Al-Turaiki, a recipient of the Order of King Abdulaziz and Cheman Shaik, inventor of the US patent-winning advanced encryption algorithm for information security.

In 2008, Kohinoor Toastmasters Club, an affiliate of the US-based Toastmasters International, conducted a youth leadership program in collaboration with Yara school at the Indian embassy auditorium. In April 2010, the deputy managing editor of Arab News Siraj Wahab mentioned Yara International School in his article as one of the ten "most popular CBSE-affiliated schools" in Saudi Arabia. In May 2012 Arab News in its special International Schools Supplement column, Indian journalist Ghazanfar Ali Khan wrote about Yara International School as the "frontrunner in terms of providing a conductive learning environment" and as among Riyadh's "particularly blessed with a rich menu of choices for parents".

Yara International School alongside Jeddah-based Hala International School was categorized as amongst the best performing schools in their respective cities meanwhile principal Aasima Saleem announced the installation of Ebix Smartclass (then Educomp Smartclass) interactive whiteboards in the school from the next academic year onwards. In June 2012, Madhyamam reported that an Malayali-origin fifth grade student from Yara International School was cast in a short Arabic-language film made by a group of young Saudi activists that raised awareness against juvenile delinquency.

In November 2012, Yara International School made headlines in the Saudi media when it organized a diabetes awareness campaign in the observance of World Diabetes Day in which 400 male students and staffs took part in a walkathon at ar-Rabwah's Nahda Park. The event was backed by many local companies like Hewlett-Packard, Lions Club of Riyadh, Lulu Hypermarket and Nadec.

==== Inter-school events timeline ====
Playground at al-Rabwah campus of Yara International School, 2012

In June 2009 the Riyadh Chapter of the Muslim Educational Society (MES) organized an event to honor the students of CBSE Class 9 and 12 for their scholastic achievements and awarded gold medals and cash awards in the ceremony, Yara school's principal Aasima Saleem along with IISR principal Manzar Jamal Siddiqui attended the event.

The now-deserted villa campus in June 2019 which served as the school's premises from May 2003 until March 2013 in the al-Rabwah neighborhood of Riyadh

In January 2011 Yara school along with eight other Indian schools, including DPS Riyadh took part the Inter-school contest hosted by Students India forum to raise awareness against the Endosulfan chemical, whereby urging the Indian government to ban it. In May 2011 Yara, along with five other schools participated in the Carrefour-sponsored five-day Second Open International Table Tennis Tournament (OITTT) held at the New Middle East International School. In May 2012 Yara school won the PVC Cup of under-13 football tournament organized by the Peevees Group of Schools in Riyadh. In June 2012, Yara school attended the 22nd Cluster Meet of CBSE Gulf Sahodaya member schools which took place at the International Indian School Jeddah. It also took part in the kick-off football match in which it faced-off with International Indian School Jubail. In October 2012, Jeddah-based Al-Wurood International School defeated Yara International School at second edition of Peevees Cup Soccer Championship held at the Euro Village Sports Complex Stadium in Khobar.

=== Relocation to ad-Dirah neighborhood (2013) ===
A switched-off Smartclass interactive whiteboard in a classroom

By March 2013 the Yara International School shifted its campus from ar-Rabwah neighborhood to the premises of the Female Student Study Center in ad-Dirah neighborhood of Riyadh when the latter along with other satellite campuses of Imam Mohammad Ibn Saud Islamic University began relocating their students and faculty to the newly built King Abdullah City for Female Students in al-Shemal. The relocation was concurrent with the government's introduction of stringent rules over the operation of private schools in leased villas. In July 2013, Yara school's principal Aasima Saleem attended an event organized by Kohinoor Toastmasters Club to celebrate its 16th anniversary and conducted its induction ceremony and elected its new executive committee. In October 2013, Yara school organized an event to observe Gandhi Jayanti where students of grades 6 and 7 performed the Kavi Pradeep's De Dee Hame Azaadi in Mahatma Gandhi's memory and concluded the event by screening Shyam Benegal's 1996 Indian-South African film The Making of the Mahatma.

In 2014, the bridge structure that horizontally connected the entrance from above al-Wazir Street with the primary building of the school in the other end was demolished for the construction of Qasr al-Hokm Metro Station. In May 2016 Arab News reported that Yara has been maintaining a streak of 100% success rate in the annual All India Secondary School Examination since 2008. In early January 2017, Suprabhaatham Daily reported that a 30-year-old Malayali-origin teacher from Yara International School died while giving birth to her third son in a hospital in Riyadh. In May 2017, Yara school celebrated Health Week by organizing a health awareness program for students from kindergarten till third grade. In June 2017, it held an investiture ceremony of the school council in which Kerala's former education minister P. K. Abdu Rabb attended as the event's chief guest.

Main ground in Boys Section

In May 2018 the then Indian ambassador to Saudi Arabia Ahmed Javed awarded medals and honors to several principals and heads of institutions, including Yara's Aasima Saleem for their contribution in the field of education during the induction and award ceremony of Bharat Scouts and Guides which was held at the International Indian School, Riyadh. In early August 2019, Mathrubhumi reported that on the 13th death anniversary of Karat Muhammad Samadani, the founder of M J Higher Secondary School and former member of Yara International School's management committee, former Lok Sabha Member of parliament M. P. Abdussamad Samadani released a book in the presence of C. Moyinkutty at auditorium of Vadi Husna Public School, Kozhikode in his remembrance and for his contribution towards the Indian community in Saudi Arabia.

In late August 2019, Yara announced through its Facebook handle that it'll start offering British curriculum prescribed by Cambridge Assessment International Education and is opening admission to all nationalities from September 2019 onwards. Yara was among the 26 out of 41 schools qualified to take part in CBSE Cluster Meet as well as in the 29th Principals’ Conference titled 'Hubs of Learning' conducted in the sidelines of the former at the International Indian School Jeddah in October 2019. In February 2021, Yara school's Aasima Saleem was among 193 principals who attended Gulf Sahodaya Conference in Riyadh and discussed the challenges faced by the Indian schools located in the member states of the Gulf Cooperation Council (GCC), including COVID-19 pandemic and the implementation of India's National Education Policy 2020. In April 2021, Yara school's principal Aasima Saleem honored parents of students who helped their wards with learning during the COVID-19 pandemic. In February 2022, the Indian embassy informed through its official Twitter handle that it organized a specialized yoga workshop titled "Benefits of Suryanamaskar" within the premises of Yara International School. In May 2023, the school celebrated its 20th anniversary. Yara discontinued offering British curriculum by 2023.

A corridor in Boys Section

==== Inter-school events timeline ====
In October 2013 Yara participated in an Inter-School debate competition for both secondary and senior secondary levels held at Al Yasmin International School, Dr Mohammed Ahmed Badshah, assistant professor at King Saud University attended as the event's chief guest. In November 2013, Yara school defeated Al Alia International Indian School at the third Inter-School Football tournament organized by LuLu Group. In October 2014, Madhyamam reported that Yara secured second position among 16 international Indian schools of Riyadh, after International Indian School Riyadh in the Sixth Keli-Sona Youth Festival. In May 2015, Al Alia International Indian School conducted an investiture ceremony of the Girls' Wing, in which Yara school's principal Aasima Saleem was invited as the chief guest. In October 2015, Yara attended the 25th Cluster Meet on the topic 'Judiciary is biased towards the Influential', hosted by International Indian School Jeddah along with several other CBSE affiliated schools. In November 2015, Yara school squared-off with Al Alia International Indian School and defeated it in the Lulu Cup Keli Inter-School Football Tournament, hosted by LuLu Group at the Nasriya Al-Asima International Stadium in Riyadh but was later defeated in the next month by International Indian Public School Riyadh. In April 2016, Yara school's Ashwin Prasad won second prize in the junior category drawing competition conducted by Al Madina Hypermarket during an event to mark the supermarket's first anniversary. In May 2016, Yara's students took part in the RIA Faber Castell Impressions 2016 organized by The Riyadh Indian Association (RIA) and bagged first prize. In December 2016, Ashwin Prasad, a student of Yara school gave an influential speech on Sir Syed in an event organized by Aligarh Muslim University Old Boys' Association Riyadh to commemorate the 196th birth anniversary of Sir Syed Ahmad Khan where India's former Information and Broadcasting minister and Indian National Congress leader Manish Tewari attended as the event's chief guest.

Yara International School auditorium entrance

In October 2017, Yara International School defeated Modern Middle East International School and won several gold and silver medals in long jump, shot put and javelin throw at the 27th Zonal Athletic Meet in Dammam. In November 2017, Yara school's students took part in an essay writing contest titled 'The advantages of Maulana Azad's educational vision in contemporary India' during a program organized jointly by Osmania University Alumni Association Riyadh (OUAAR) and Hindustani Bazme Urdu in observance of India's National Education Day in which Arab News managing editor Siraj Wahab and first secretary at the Embassy of India, Dr. Hifzur Rahman attended as the event's chief guests. In December 2017, Yara took part besides 6 other schools in the BEST CUP Under 14 Football Championship hosted by Al-Khozama International School at the Euro Village Sports Complex Stadium in Khobar. In May 2018, Yara International School and others honored several students with gold medals for their memorization of the Quran at the MES (Muslim Education Society) Excellence Award Ceremony which was inaugurated by First Secretary of the Indian Embassy in Riyadh V Narayanan. In October 2018, Yara participated in the Keli Inter-School Football Tournament organized by Safa Makkah Polyclinic and was defeated by International Indian School Riyadh. In November 2018 Yara International School defeated International Indian Public School at the Keli Inter School Football held at the Nazriya Real Madrid Academy Stadium in Riyadh. In December 2019, Yara was among the eight schools who participated in the BEST Cup’19, the under-14 football tournament hosted by Al-Khozama International School held at the Euro Village Sports Complex Stadium in Khobar.

== Academics and curriculum ==
A classroom after dispersal in Boys Section

=== Central Board of Secondary Education (CBSE) ===
Yara International School offers K–12 education provided by the Central Board of Secondary Education. The school was upgraded to Class 10 (secondary level) in 2007 and Class 12 (senior secondary level) in 2013. It offers 12 subjects, that include:

- English (First Language and medium of instruction)
- Hindi (Second Language, UKG onwards)
- Arabic, Urdu, Malayalam, Marathi, Kannada, Tamil, Telugu (Third Language, Grade 2 onwards)
- Mathematics
- General Science
- Social Science
- Health and Physical Education
- Art and Craft (S.U.P.W)
- Computer Science
- Saudi History and Culture (Note: Article 13 of the International Schools Regulations issued by the Ministry of Education obliges all foreign and international schools to allot minimum one hour in a week to teach history and geography of Saudi Arabia.)
- Spoken Arabic (Note: Article 13 of the International Schools Regulations issued by the Ministry of Education obliges all foreign and international schools to allot minimum one hour in a week to teach basic Arabic.)
- Islamic Studies or Moral Science (Note: Article 13 of the International Schools Regulations issued by the Ministry of Education obliges all foreign and international schools to allot minimum one hour in a week to teach Islamic culture.)
- General Knowledge

=== Cambridge Assessment International Education (discontinued) ===
Yara International School offered British curriculum prescribed by the Cambridge Assessment International Education between 2019 and 2023.

- Early Years Curriculum (KG1-KG3)
- Cambridge Primary
- Cambridge Lower Secondary
- Cambridge Upper Secondary (IGCSE)
- Cambridge International Levels

Playground in Boys Section

== Campus and student life ==
Since its inception, the school primarily served the Indian community of Riyadh, mostly Malayalis and Deccanis. In September 2019, it opened admissions for all nationalities when the school announced to offer British curriculum side by side with Indian curriculum. However, in 2023, the school discontinued offering British curriculum.

Since March 2013, the school is located in the former premises of the Female Student Study Center of Imam Mohammad Ibn Saud Islamic University. The school is situated opposite to the building of the Memorial School, which was the first school of Riyadh established by King Abdulaziz ibn Saud. Covering an area of 2.44 acres, the campus is divided into two sections for male and female students respectively. The school has 119 classrooms and 13 laboratories for science, mathematics and computer, 1 library, dance and music rooms, health and wellness facility, play grounds, kindergarten recreation area, assembly area, a self-contained infirmary, montessori room and an auditorium, besides having Smart Class interactive whiteboard system installed in all grades. The school's academic session for Indian curriculum starts from April and ends in March whereas the classes for British curriculum commence in September and continues till August. The school has a sexual harassment committee to oversee issues related to sexual harassment and also provides student counselling.

=== Co-curricular activities ===
At the beginning of the academic year, students are supposed to any one of the indoor or outdoor activities, such as arts and crafts, music, dance, yoga, aerobics, football, athletics, scouts and guides or become a member of any one of the assortment of clubs such as, literary club, science and eco club, math club, heritage club or personality development club.

== Management and key people ==
The school is sponsored by Khalid Abdullah Mohammed Aldrees, a Saudi academician and activist and is managed by the members of the Yara Educational Trust or SMC (School Management Committee).

School Management Committee (SMC) members (as of 2021)
Name	Position held
Khalid Abdullah Mohammed Aldrees	Sponsor and chief executive officer
Habeebul Rahman PP	School Patron
Aasima Saleem	Principal, Correspondent and Secretary
Ashraf PV	Member
Swagata Bose	Head Mistress (Grades 6 to 8) and Teachers' Representative (Girls section)
Surur Omer	Teachers' Representative (Boys section), Member
Shanu C. Thomas	Member, Principal, Al Alia International Indian School
Radha Venkatesh	Member
Rahmabi Afsal	Member
Leela Balakumar	Head Mistress (Kindergarten)

As per the information obtained largely from Saudi media, the MC members of the school have formerly included Hameed Naha, Showkathali Shahjahan, A. R. Kutty, Khalid Rahman, Abubacker, Ali Koya and late Karat Muhammad Samadani.

== Notable alumni ==
- Fathima Latheef

== See also ==
- Indians in Saudi Arabia
- List of schools in Saudi Arabia
- Education in Saudi Arabia
