= Imam Mohammad Ibn Saud Islamic University Al Nafal Campus =

1984–2012 campus of Imam Mohammad Ibn Saud Islamic University

Female Student Study Center of Imam Mohammad Ibn Saud Islamic University
- مركز دراسة الطالبات – فرع النفل
- Type: Satellite campus of Imam Mohammad Ibn Saud Islamic University
- Active: 1984–2012
- Parent institution: Imam Mohammad Ibn Saud Islamic University
- Address: an-Nafal, Riyadh, Saudi Arabia
- Campus: Suburban
- Website: مكتبة مركز دراسة الطالبات - فرع النفل

The Female Student Study Center – Al Nafal Branch (Arabic: مكتبة مركز دراسة الطالبات – فرع النفل, romanized: Markaz Dirāsah aṭ-Ṭālibāt – Farʿ al-Nafl) was one of the three women-only satellite campuses of Imam Mohammad Ibn Saud Islamic University in an-Nafal, Riyadh, Saudi Arabia, active from 1984 to 2012.

Established in 1984, the campus offered courses at undergraduate, postgraduate and doctorate levels in fields such as Islamic studies, translation studies, economics, accounting, management and business administration. The students and faculty were relocated to newly built King Abdullah City for Female Students in 2012 and thus, disbanding the campus.

== History ==
The Female Student Study Center in Al Batha, Riyadh was established in 1984 alongside al-Malaz and al-Batha branches during the reign of King Fahd as a women-exclusive satellite campus of Imam Mohammad Ibn Saud Islamic University to promote female education in Saudi Arabia. The campus offered courses at undergraduate, postgraduate and doctorate levels in fields such as Islamic studies, translation studies, economics, accounting, management and business administration.

== 2012 relocation to King Abdullah City for Female Students ==
In January 2006, King Abdullah laid down the foundation for the construction of the 2 billion riyal King Abdullah City for Female Students in the western-part of the premises of Imam Mohammad Ibn Saud Islamic University. The relocation of the students from the satellite campuses to the new building gradually began in 2011 and was expected to be completed by early 2012 but was delayed till mid of 2012 due to lack of safety tests in the new buildings.
