= List of schools in Saudi Arabia =

This is a partial list of primary and secondary schools in the Asian country of Saudi Arabia. Tertiary schools are presented on the separate list of universities and colleges in Saudi Arabia.

== 'Asir Region ==
Abha

- Ibdaa Assir International School (previously Philippine International School in Assir)

== Eastern Province ==
Al-Khobar

- Saad National Schools

Dammam

- Bangladesh International School, Dammam
- International Indian School, Dammam
- ISG Dammam

Dhahran

- American School Dhahran
- Dhahran School

Jubail

- International Indian School, Jubail

== Mecca Region ==
Jeddah

- Al-Thager Model School
- American International School of Jeddah
- British International School of Jeddah
- Dar Jana International School - Separate boys' and girls' sections
- DPS Jeddah Al-Falah International School
- German International School Jeddah
- International Indian School, Jeddah
- International Philippine School in Jeddah
- Jeddah Japanese School (Japanese: ジッダ日本人学校)
- Korean School in Jeddah (KISJ, Korean: 젯다한국학교)
  - It was established on 18 September 1976. On 2 June of that year the Middle East Economic Cooperation Working Committee decided to establish the school, with a preparation committee formed on 5 August.
- Nün Academy
- Pakistan International School Jeddah - English Section) (PISJES)
- Scuola Italiana di Gedda (Italian International School Jeddah)

Mecca

- Madrasah as-Sawlatiyah

== Riyadh Region ==
Riyadh

- Al Hussan International School Riyadh
- Al Alia International Indian School
- Al Yasmin International School
- American International School – Riyadh
- Bangladesh International School, English Section, Riyadh
- Delhi Public School, Riyadh
- Delta Schools
- International Indian Public School, Riyadh
- International Indian School, Riyadh
- King Salman Global Academy for Arabic Language
- Korean School in Riyadh (Korean: 리야드한국학교)
- The Memorial School
- Najd National Schools
- Princes' School
- Reigate Grammar School (formerly Multinational School)
- Yara International School

== See also ==
- Education in Saudi Arabia
- Lists of schools
