= Al Alia International Indian School =

Private school in Riyadh, Saudi Arabia

- المدرسة العالية العالمية الهندية

- Al Alia International Indian School, 2024

Location
- Prince Fahad bin Ibrahim Al Saud Street; Al Malazz, Riyadh 11496; Saudi Arabia; 24°39′18″N 46°43′45″E

Information
- Other name: Al Aliya International School
- Former name: Al-Alia Indian Central School
- School type: Private day school
- Motto: Scaling Greater Heights Still...
- Opened: 6 April 2003; 23 years ago
- Founder: Thomas Chandy
- School board: Central Board of Secondary Education
- Educational authority: Ministry of Education, Saudi Arabia
- Chairperson: Mary Chandy
- Academic Supervisor (Boys Section): Sreekanth R
- Principal (Girls Section): Latha Kavitha
- Vice Principal (Girls Junior Section): ......
- Grades: K–12
- Gender: Co-education (till kindergarten); Gender-isolated (from first grade)
- Age range: 4 to 18
- Enrollment: 2525
- Education system: Indian
- Language: English
- Houses: Boys; Ruby; Topaz; Emerald; Sapphire; Girls; Ruby; Topaz; Emerald; Sapphire
- Affiliation: CBSE Gulf Sahodaya
- Demonym: Alian
- Website: alaliaschool.com

Al Alia International Indian School (AAIIS) (Arabic: المدرسة العالية العالمية الهندية) is a K–12 private foreign school in the al-Malaz neighborhood of Riyadh, Saudi Arabia. Established in 2003 by Thomas Chandy, the school serves the local Indian diaspora, mostly Malayalis, and offers Indian curriculum prescribed by the Central Board of Secondary Education (CBSE).

== History ==
=== Establishment and early days ===
In January 2003, Indian politician and educationist Thomas Chandy announced the establishment of Al-Alia Indian Central School in the capital's al-Aziziyah neighborhood during a press-conference among journalists in Riyadh. Chandy chose al-Aziziyah neighborhood in order to cope with the soaring education needs of the Indian community in Manfuhah and Ghubaira neighborhoods. The school was inaugurated on 6 April 2003 with 23 teachers and 200 students and Ram Thakur as its inaugural principal. In 2009, the school shifted its premises from al-Aziziyah to a new campus in al-Malaz neighbourhood.

In 2012, the school made headlines when it hosted a condolence meeting within its premises upon the death of former Indian ambassador to Saudi Arabia MO Hasan Farook Maricar. More than 40 different leaders of various Indian organization attended the event presided over by the school's then principal, Pious John. In May 2015, Al Alia International Indian School conducted an investiture ceremony of the Girls' Wing, in which Yara school's principal Aasima Saleem was invited as the chief guest. Al Alia celebrated its 17th anniversary in late 2019, in which Rajesh Kumar from the Indian embassy in Riyadh was invited as chief guest.

==== Inter-school events timeline ====
In November 2013, Yara International School defeated Al Alia International Indian School at the third Inter-School Football tournament organized by LuLu Group. In 2014, Al-Alia took part in the Peevees UN Simulation Conference which was chaired by Capt. William Roe, managing director of the Saudi Aviation Flight Academy and hosted by Al Yasmin International School in Riyadh. In November 2015, Al-Alia participated in Lulu-Keli Inter-School Football Tournament hosted by LuLu Group at Nasriya Al-Asima International Stadium in Riyadh and also faced-off against Yara International School. In 2017, Riyadh Indian Association (RIA) hosted RIA Faber Castell Impressions 2017, in which 700 students from different countries participated, including Al Alia. IISR blanked out Al Alia in the 5th Keli Inter-School Football Tournament for Safa Makkah Cup held at Nadi Al-Riyadh Stadium.

== Management and key people ==
Al-Alia International Indian School is owned by Mohammad Hamad Abdullah Al Humaidi, a Kuwaiti educationist, and is managed by a committee of three permanent and eight non-permanent members.

List of principals of the school
Principal	In office
Ram Dial Thakur	2003 – 2007
Renjith Alexander	2007 – 2011
Pious John	2011 – 2015
Shanu C Thomas	2015 – 2024
Kavitha Latha Kadhiresan	2024 – Present

== See also ==
- Indians in Saudi Arabia
- List of schools in Saudi Arabia
- Yara International School
