= King Abdullah City =

In Saudi Arabia, King Abdullah City may refer to:

- King Abdullah City for Atomic and Renewable Energy
- King Abdullah City for Female Students
- King Abdullah District
- King Abdullah Economic City
- King Abdullah Financial District
- King Abdullah Sports City
