= Delhi Public School, Riyadh =

Daratassalam International Delhi Public School
- مدرسة دارة السلام العالمية الرياض

Location
- Al Mathar Ash Shamali, Umm al-Hammam, Riyadh; Saudi Arabia
- Coordinates: 24°45′31″N 46°39′20″E

Information
- School type: Private
- Motto: Self Before Service
- Established: 15 July 2004; 21 years ago
- School board: Central Board of Secondary Education; IGCSE
- Educational authority: Ministry of Education, Saudi Arabia
- Chairman: Dr. Ibrahim Al-Quayid
- Principal: Mairaj Mohammad Khan
- Grades: K–12
- Gender: Co-education (till kindergarten); Gender-isolated (from first grade)
- Age range: 4 to 18
- Education system: Indian (since 2004); British (since 2008)
- Language: English
- Affiliation: CBSE Gulf Sahodaya
- Website: dpsriyadh.org

Daratassalam International Delhi Public School, Riyadh (Arabic: مدرسة دارة السلام العالمية الرياض), better known as DPS Riyadh, is a K–12 gender-isolated English-medium community-based international school in Umm al-Hammam, Riyadh, Saudi Arabia. Primarily serving the Indian diaspora, it was founded in 2004 and comes under the aegis of Delhi Public School Society. It offers Indian curriculum prescribed by the Central Board of Secondary Education besides being a registered Cambridge International School. It is a member of the CBSE Gulf Sahodaya and is approved by the Ministry of Education, Government of Saudi Arabia.

== History ==
In March 2004, while addressing a press-conference at the Riyadh Palace Hotel, the members of the DPS Society announced plans for opening a branch of Delhi Public Schools in Riyadh. Delhi Public School was established on 15 July 2004 in the al-Maruh neighborhood of Riyadh. In 2008, the school began offering IGCSE syllabus alongside the CBSE curriculum. In 2012, the school management intended to shift the campus to a new location in Umm al-Hammam neighborhood, which was completed by January 2013.

== See also ==
- List of schools in Saudi Arabia
