= Hala International School =

Defunct international school in Jeddah, Saudi Arabia

Hala International School مدرسة هلا العالمية

Location
- Al Khawarizmi, Al Aziziyah; Jeddah 23342; Saudi Arabia
- Coordinates: 21°33′42″N 39°12′21″E

Information
- Motto: وَقُل رَّبِّ زِدْنِي عِلْمًا (Qur'an 20:114) (My Lord, increase me in knowledge)
- Established: 1991; 34 years ago
- Status: Defunct
- Closed: 2018; 7 years ago
- School board: Northwest Accreditation Commission; Cambridge Assessment International Education
- Educational authority: Ministry of Education, Government of Saudi Arabia
- Director: Samir Tarek Ali Khan
- Teaching staff: 150
- Age range: 3 to 18
- Enrollment: 1500 (2013)
- Education system: American (1991–2018); British (2000–2018)
- Language: English
- Houses: Greenettes; Rosettes; Bluettes; Yellowettes
- Slogan: Helping the present, forming the future
- Website: www.halaschool.com (permanent dead link)

Hala International School (HIS) (Arabic: مدرسة هلا العالمية, romanized: Madrasah Hala al-ʿĀlamīyah) was a K–12 gender-isolated English-medium multicultural international school in the al-Aziziyah neighborhood of Jeddah, Saudi Arabia, active from 1991 to 2018 and served students across 24 different nationalities from the city, mostly the Pakistani diaspora.

Established in 1991, it was accredited to the Northwest Accreditation Commission (NWAC) and later with the Cambridge Assessment International Education. It was approved by the Ministry of Education, Government of Saudi Arabia and was regarded as one of the best performing schools in Jeddah prior to its closure in 2018.

== History ==
Hala International School was established in 1991. The school's had its first batch of IGCSE students graduated in the year 2000. In May 2002, Hala International School was one of the participants in the JCL Inter-School U-15 Schools Cricket Tournament, organized by the Jeddah Cricket League and sponsored by Saudi Gazette. In November 2003, the school organized a science fair within its campus where children from grades 4 to 10 honed their skills and exhibited several exhibits. In August 2005, six of forty-one students in the sixth graduating batch of Hala became eligible for ICE (International Certificate of Education) award. In February 2009, Arab News reported that one of Hala's students was among the 6 students from Saudi Arabia that ranked top "in the world" in the CIE examinations conducted in June 2008.

In May 2012, Arab News in its special International Schools Supplement column, Hala International School alongside Yara International School was categorized as amongst the best performing schools in their respective cities.

In May 2012, The local chapter of Karate Budokan International held a black belt grading test at Hala International School. In March 2013, The British Council honored two of Hala's students for their outstanding performance in the Cambridge AS and A level examinations. In October 2013, Saudi Gazette reported that Hala International School, in observance of the Saudi National Day, the school organized an event for the same where kindergarten and junior students created the Saudi flag using thumbprints and the senior students painted large banners based on the culture and traditions of the country. In 2014, Arab News reported that one of Hala's students secured the fourth world rank in ESL and eventually first rank in whole of Saudi Arabia. In January 2016, My Care Hala Green won the My Care Medical Center League 2015 by beating Hala International School Jeddah by a huge margin of 93 runs. In February 2016, one of Hala's students was the recipient of the world learner awards for IGCSE Foreign Language Arabic.

=== Closure ===
In late March 2018, Hala International School announced through its official Facebook handle that it is discontinuing operations by the end of the academic year without specifying any reasons and asked the parents of the respective students to enroll their kids elsewhere after the conclusion of final examinations. The circular read,

Hala International School

Dear Parent, 27/3/2018
You have been informed well in advance that our school, Hala International School, will be closing down at the end of this academic year, 2017-2018. Please be reminded that it is your responsibility alone to make sure that your ward gets admitted to another school of your choice. Kindly make sure that you start proceedings for the same from now to ensure their admission.
Thanks
The management

H.I.S

==== Alleged demolition ====
In May 2018, in less than two months after the announcement of its closure, a 33-second unverified video surfaced on YouTube which apparently showed the premises of the school being razed down by construction workers and heavy-duty vehicles.
