= American International School – Riyadh =

Coordinates: 24.84733°N 46.63475°E

- Official Logo of the American International School - Riyadh
- Riyadh, Saudi Arabia

Information
- Type: Independent
- Established: 1963
- Superintendent: Colin Boudreau
- CEEB code: 692126
- Faculty: 119
- Enrollment: 1500+
- Website: www.aisr.org

The American International School – Riyadh (AIS-R) (previously known as American Preparatory School of Riyadh, RICS and SAIS-R) is an independent, non-profit, K-12, coeducational day school following an American-based curriculum with a focus on international perspectives. The IB Diploma Program is also offered in the high school. The school was established in 1963 and is located in the kingdom's capital, Riyadh.

== History ==
In 1963, parents formed the American Preparatory School of Riyadh (APS), serving seven enrolled students from kindergarten to third grade. In 1965, APS merged with a Ford Foundation school to form the Riyadh International Community School (RICS). As the capital of Riyadh grew between 1965 and 1974, so too did the school's student body. From 1974 to 1979, RICS' enrollment increased from 400 students to more than 1,500. After several moves to accommodate increasing enrollment, the school opened in South Riyadh in 1977. In 1982, the school's name was changed again, this time to the Saudi Arabian International School - Riyadh (SAIS-R). The school's peak enrollment of 2,750 students occurred in the 1984–85 school year. With the school's growth in enrollment came the expansion of curriculum, facilities, services, programs, and grade levels. The school's name was once again changed to its present name - AIS-R - in 1999. As of 2009, enrollment was near capacity with more than 1600 students. In 2014, AIS-R moved to its new campus in the northern region of Riyadh. The campus was built in cooperation with Al Bustan Village, a residential compound.

== Academic program ==
All students take internal examinations and some take DP courses and sit for external examinations.

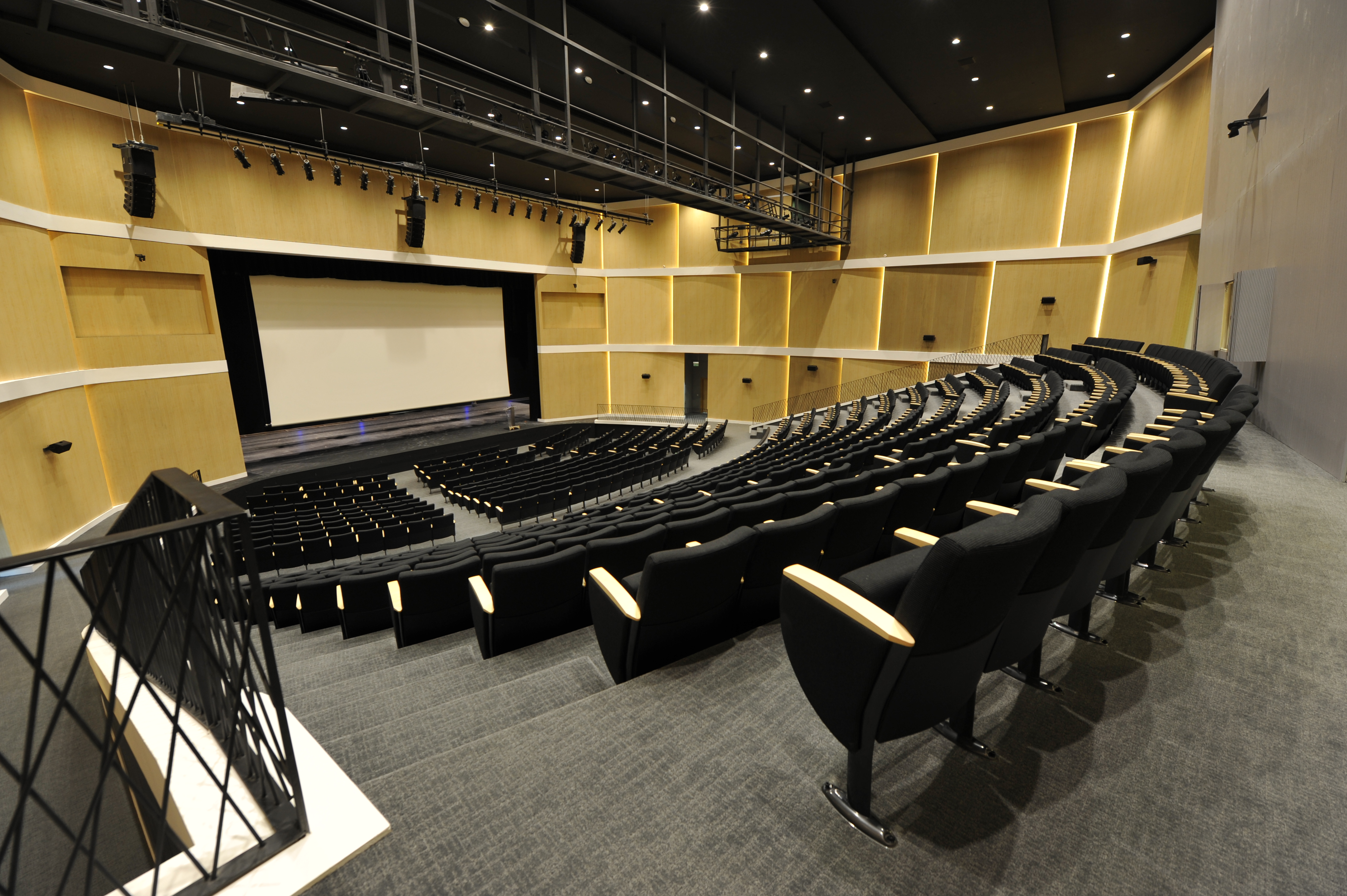
As part of AIS-R's new school project, a 700-seat theater was constructed.

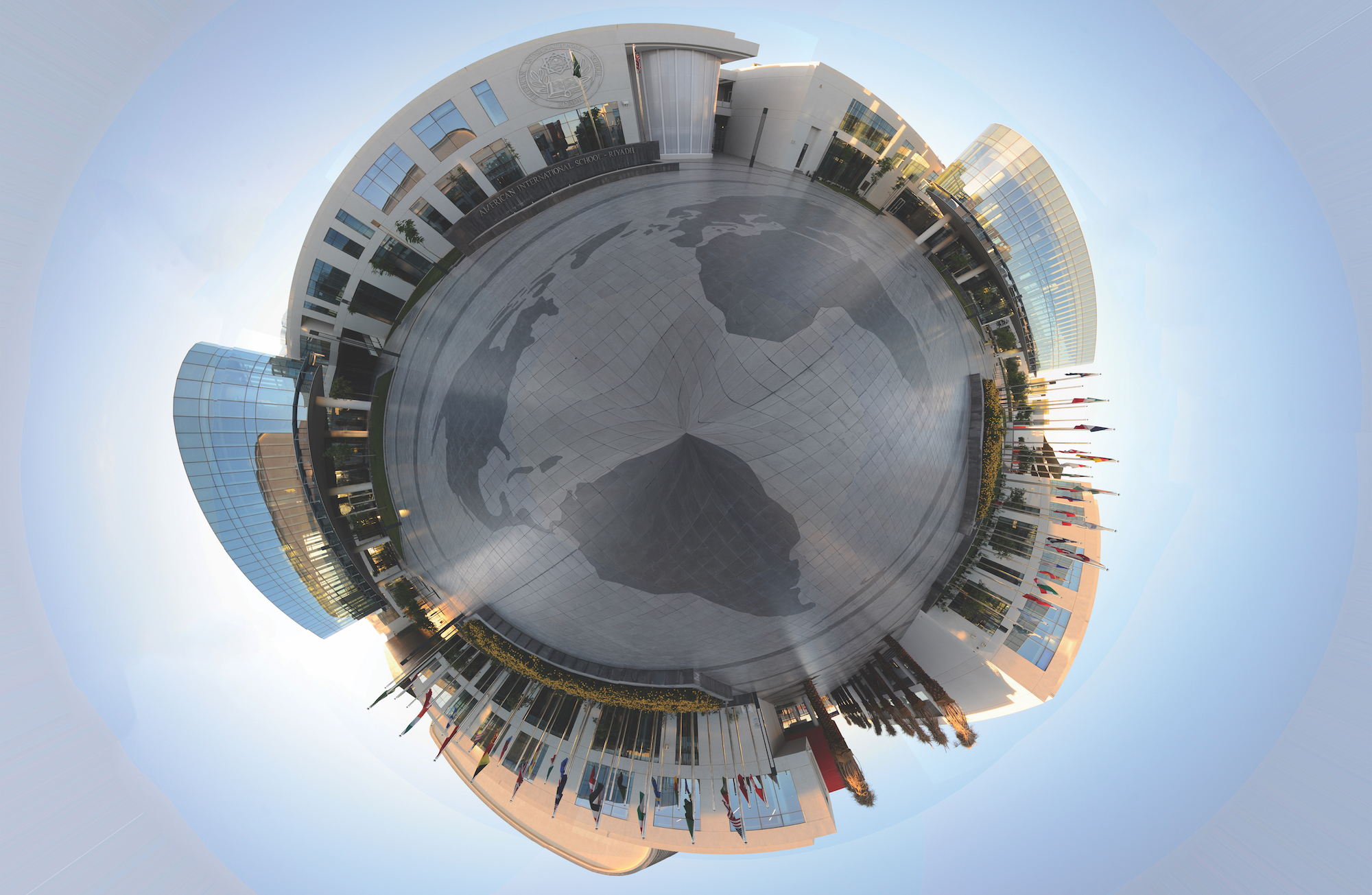
American International School - Riyadh Panoramic Tiny Planet

== See also ==
- Americans living in Saudi Arabia
- List of schools in Saudi Arabia
