= Dhahran School =

- Saudi Aramco Residential Camp in Dhahran

Information
- Established: since 1944
- Status: Active
- Sister school: Dhahran Hills School
- Educational authority: Saudi Aramco Schools district
- Language: English

The Dhahran School is an international school owned and operated by the Saudi Aramco Schools district. It is part of the Saudi Aramco Expatriate Schools District. Dhahran School is exclusively used by children of Saudi Aramco employees and serves children from kindergarten through grade eight. Dhahran School is free of charge for all children of Saudi Aramco employees. The Dhahran School is located inside the Saudi Aramco Residential Camp in Dhahran, operated by Saudi Aramco, within the Eastern Province of Saudi Arabia. The school is divided into the Dhahran Hills School and the Dhahran Middle School, where the Dhahran Hills School serves children from kindergarten through grade four and the Dhahran Middle School teaches students between the grades five and eight. The mascot of the Dhahran Hills School is the Arabian horse, while the mascot of the Dhahran Middle School is the wildcat. There is also a Dhahran High School that is in Saudi Arabia, but it is not in the school district.

== History ==
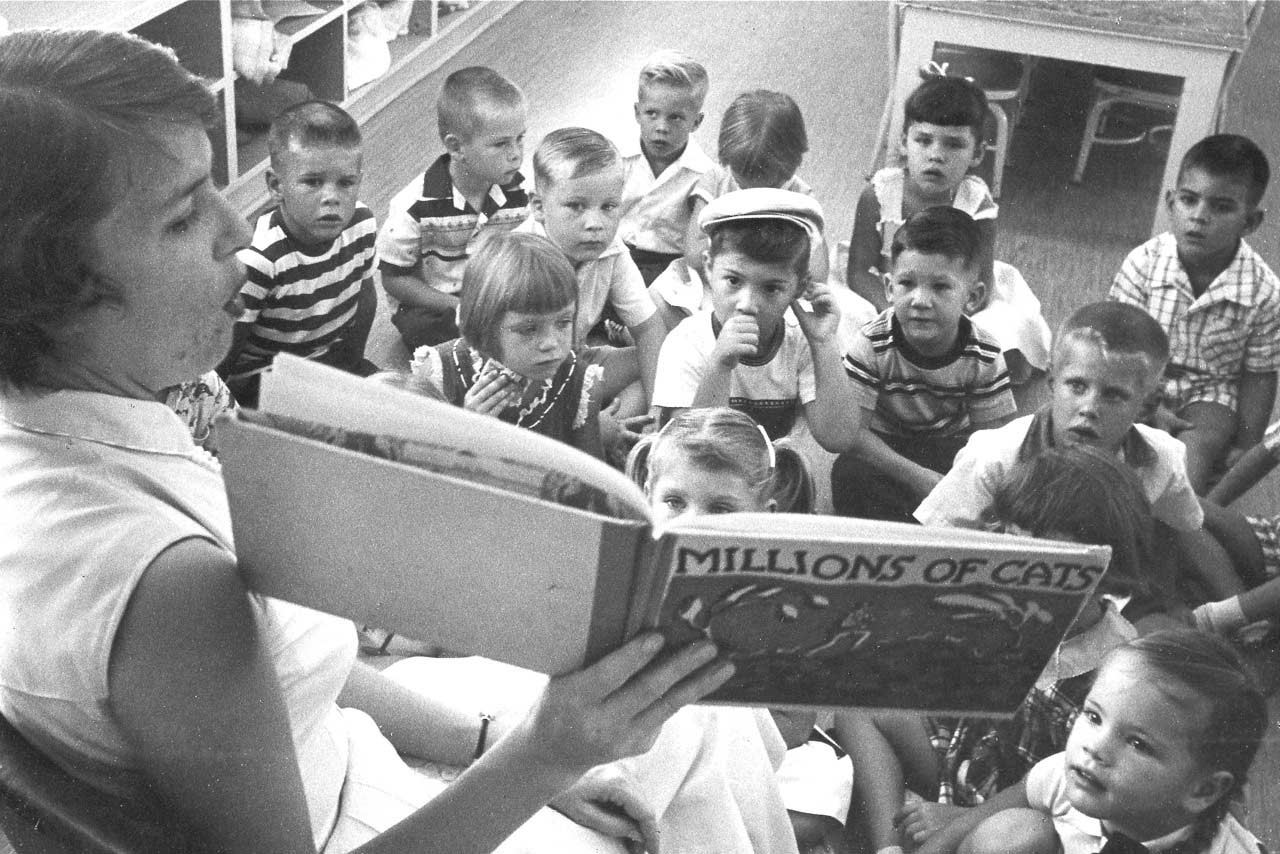
A teacher reading to children at Dhahran Elementary School in 1957

The school was first opened in 1944 to cater the educational needs of American children whose parents were working for Saudi Aramco (Arabian American Oil Company).

== Campus ==
The Dhahran Hills School and the Dhahran Middle School are located on separate campuses, both within the Saudi Aramco Residential Camp in Dhahran.

== Curriculum ==
The school follows an American-style curriculum that is certified by multiple US based organizations including the Middle States Association of Colleges and School, but also works to meet the needs of non-American students. Starting from the 2010 to 2011 school year, the school has started a house program like that of a Greek college. The program divides the school into four 'houses', each including at least two homeroom classes from each grade. All faculty members are assigned to a specific house as well. The school has a tradition of placing students into top American boarding schools including Blair Academy, Phillips Academy Andover, and Phillips Exeter Academy.

== See also ==
- Americans living in Saudi Arabia
- List of schools in Saudi Arabia
