= Bangladesh International School, English Section, Riyadh =

Location
- Olaya, Riyadh, Saudi Arabia; 24°41′04.56″N 46°41′53.52″E

Information
- Former name: Bangladesh Embassy School, Riyadh
- Type: International
- Motto: Knowledge is everything
- Established: 1990
- Principal: Iqbal Sheikh (Note: MSM Hussein was the principal prior to Karim Reza's appointment to the post)
- Website: bisesriyadh.com

Bangladesh International School, English Section, Riyadh (BISES, Riyadh) is a school located in the Olaya district of Riyadh, Saudi Arabia. It follows the British Curriculum.

== History ==
Bangladesh International School, English Section, Riyadh was established in 1990 for students of the Bangladeshi community in Riyadh. It was originally known as the Bangladesh Embassy School due to its administration by the Bangladeshi Embassy in Riyadh. It transitioned to being led by a board of directors elected by students' parents.

== Structure ==
The school has two sections:

- The Junior section – Grade UKG to Grade 2 (coeducation)
- The Secondary/Higher section – Grade 3 to Grade 12 (with separate boys and girls sections (known as wings) according to the education law of the Ministry of Education of Saudi Arabia)

At the time of writing (2025), the Junior section and the Boys wings are consolidated into a single building, while the Girls wings exist in a separate building.

== See also ==
- Bangladeshis in Saudi Arabia
- List of schools in Saudi Arabia
