= Al Yasmin International School =

- مدرسة الیاسمین العالمية

Location
- Ibn Fares Street; Al Malazz, Riyadh 12836; Saudi Arabia; 24°39′57″N 46°44′36″E

Information
- School type: Private
- Motto: وَقُل رَّبِّ زِدْنِي عِلْمًا (Qur'an 20:114) (My Lord, increase my knowledge)
- Opened: 2 May 1999; 27 years ago
- Founder: P.V. Abdul Wahab
- School board: Central Board of Secondary Education
- Educational authority: Ministry of Education, Saudi Arabia
- Trust: Peevees Group of Schools
- Chairman: Ahmad al-Thaweel
- Principal: SM Shaukat Perwez
- Vice Chairperson: Badar al-Alowi
- Office Superintendent: Rahina UK
- Teaching staff: 87
- Grades: K–12
- Gender: Co-education (till kindergarten); Gender-isolated (from first grade)
- Age range: 4 to 18
- Education system: Indian
- Language: English
- Affiliation: CBSE Gulf Sahodaya
- Demonym: Yasminite
- Website: alyasmin.edu.sa

Al Yasmin International School (AYIS) is a K–12 private foreign school in the al-Malaz neighborhood of Riyadh, Saudi Arabia. Established in 1999, the school offers an Indian curriculum prescribed by the Central Board of Secondary Education, and primarily serves the Indian diaspora.

Founded in 1999 by Indian politician and businessman PV Abdul Wahab, it offers an Indian curriculum prescribed by the Central Board of Secondary Education and is a member of the CBSE Gulf Sahodaya. It is approved by the Ministry of Educationof the Government of Saudi Arabia, and is one of three schools in the country affiliated with the Peevees Group of Schools, the others being the Jeddah-based New Al-Wurood International School and Dammam-based Al-Khozama International School.

== History ==
=== Establishment and early days ===
Al Yasmin International School was established on May 2, 1999 by Peevees Group of Schools in the al-Malazz neighborhood of Riyadh, Saudi Arabia. It is named after the wife of P. V. Abdul Wahab, Yasmin Abdul Wahab. In March 2002, the Indian ambassador to Saudi Arabia, Talmiz Ahmad, inaugurated the Saudi Arabian chapter of Bharat Scouts and Guides in the Indian embassy auditorium in which Al-Yasmin's principal MC Sebastian attended as one of the several high-profile guests.

In April 2005, the school observed the World Book Day, in which the Chief of Bureau of Arab News, Raid Qutsi, attended as the event's chief guest, where he addressed the students and stressed the importance of reading books. In April 2010, the deputy managing editor of Arab News, Siraj Wahab, included Al-Yasmin International School in his article as one of the ten "most popular CBSE-affiliated schools" in Saudi Arabia. In April 2011, Al-Yasmin school's principal MC Sebastian presided over the event in which Padma Shri recipient Dr. Azad Moopen was honoured for his contribution sector and for his humanitarian works. In May 2013, the Saudi Gazette reported that Al Yasmin as one of the best performing schools in the annual All India Senior School Certificate Examination, besides two other schools in the country.

In April 2016, the school conducted its investiture ceremony, where the members of the 28th student council were elected. The event was facilitated by Ankur Vohra, the senior manager of International Outreach at Ashoka University. In September 2016, Saudi Gazette reported that Zain Samadani, a student of Al-Yasmin International School, was the sole representative of Saudi Arabia in the annual Google Science Fair held at Googleplex in Mountain View, California, United States. In July 2017, the school hosted an iftar party for their Muslim and non-Muslim students, teachers, and parents, where toppers of classes 10 and 12 were awarded with trophies and certificates.

In September 2017, Al-Yasmin observed the Saudi National Day, in which students of both the boys and girls section participated. In November 2017, the Riyadh Initiative against Substance Abuse (RISA) under the aegis of Subair Kunju Foundation conducted its second trainer training (TOT) program at Al Yasmin International School, where principal K. Rahmathulla inaugurated the function, and the program consultant Dr. A.V. Bharathan gave an introductory speech on the TOT program. In January 2019, the Riyadh Initiative against Substance Abuse (RISA) provided certificates to 87 teachers of Al-Yasmin school after successfully completing the Training of Trainer (TOT) program, where Dr. Ali Farhan, Deputy Executive Director of Family Medicine and Primary Health Care at King Abdul Aziz Medical City, attended as the event's chief guest.

Al-Yasmin International School was among the 26 out of 41 schools qualified to take part in CBSE Cluster Meet as well as in the 29th Principals’ Conference titled 'Hubs of Learning' conducted in the sidelines of the former at the International Indian School Jeddah in October 2019. In December 2019, the World Malayalee Federation Riyadh Riyadh Central Council organized the Study Class Entrance Ceremony in Al-Yasmin International School in collaboration with the Department of Cultural Affairs of the Government of Kerala.

In May 2021, Al-Yasmin school's principal K. Rahamathullah died while undergoing treatment for COVID-19. Several Indian expats in Saudi Arabia and prominent leaders of the community-based organizations expressed condolences over his death. He was replaced by Dr. SM Shaukat Perwez, the former principal of International Indian School, Riyadh.

=== Inter-school events timeline ===
In June 2002, Al-Wurood International School conducted an investiture ceremony after becoming the second school in Jeddah to be affiliated with the Central Board of Secondary Education; Al-Yasmin's principal, MC Sebastian, attended as the event's chief guest.

In November 2010, twelve students and four teachers from Al-Yasmin International School, Al-Wurood International School, and Al-Khozama International School jointly took part in a Model United Nations (MUN) conference program. Students of Al-Yasmin, New Al-Wurood, and Al-Khozama participated in the summer outward-bound program held in Uttarakhand in July 2012. In January 2013, Al-Yasmin participated in the second Peevees United Nations Simulation Conference 2013, hosted by Al-Khozama International School in the Rezayat Community Hall of Khobar where 48 students from Al-Yasmin, Al-Khozama, and Al-Wurood schools together took part in the event.

In October 2013, Al-Yasmin International School hosted an Inter-School debate competition for both secondary and senior secondary levels in its premises. Dr. Mohammed Ahmed Badshah, assistant professor at King Saud University, attended as the event's chief guest. In November 2013, Al-Yasmin International School took part in the third Peevees United Nations Simulation Conference under the patronage of the Peevees Group of Schools at the Indian consulate hosted by Al-Wurood International School in Jeddah. In January 2014, Al-Yasmin was defeated by Jawahir Al-Riyadh International School in the under-14 category of the Inter-School Cricket Tournament hosted by the Riyadh Cricket Association (RCA) and sponsored by the Saudi Cricket Center (SCC). In February 2014, Al-Yasmin International School defeated Jawahir Al-Riyadh International School in the under-14 category and secured 3rd positions in the SCC-RCA Inter-School Cricket Tournament sponsored by the Saudi Cricket Centre.

In October 2014, Al-Yasmin hosted the Peevees UN Simulation Conference which was chaired by Capt. William Roe, managing director of the Saudi Aviation Flight Academy. Al-Yasmin school came out as the winner of the 5th Peevees United Nations Simulation Conference 2015 held in November 2015 where 42 students from different schools participated. Al-Yasmin's students took part and secured second position in the 6th MUN hosted by Al-Khozama International School in Dammam. In May 2016, Al-Yasmin's students took part in the RIA Faber Castell Impressions 2016 organized by the Riyadh Indian Association (RIA) and obtained second and third place in the event.

In June 2016, Al-Yasmin was among the several schools whose students pledged to not use tobacco at the World No Tobacco Day organized by RISA.

In November 2017, Al-Yasmin International School's students excelled in the Model United Nations Conference; the student delegates acquired the first runner-up trophy. In December 2017, Al-Yasmin took part besides 6 other schools in the BEST CUP Under 14 Football Championship hosted by Al-Khozama International School at the Euro Village Sports Complex Stadium in Khobar.

In the same month, it also participated in the Indian School Fest 2017 hosted by KMCC Central Committee in Riyadh where it secured third position. In October 2018, International Indian Public School Riyadh defeated Al Yasmin International School at the 5th Keli Inter-School Football Tournament for Safa Makkah Cup at Nadi Al-Riyadh Stadium. Al-Yasmin International School took part in the 2nd Inter-School Fest Season organized by the KMCC Central Committee in May 2019.

In November 2019, Al-Yasmin participated in the 8th Model United Nations Conference hosted by the New Al-Wurood International School where it emerged as the first runner-up in the event. Sanna Dhahir, associate professor and dean of the college of humanities at Effat University congratulated the delegates.

In December 2019, Al-Khozama International School hosted BEST Cup’19, the under-14 football tournament of India's CBSE-affiliated schools in Saudi Arabia in which Al-Yasmin International School alongside seven other schools participated.

== See also ==
- List of schools in Saudi Arabia
