= Foreign workers in Saudi Arabia =

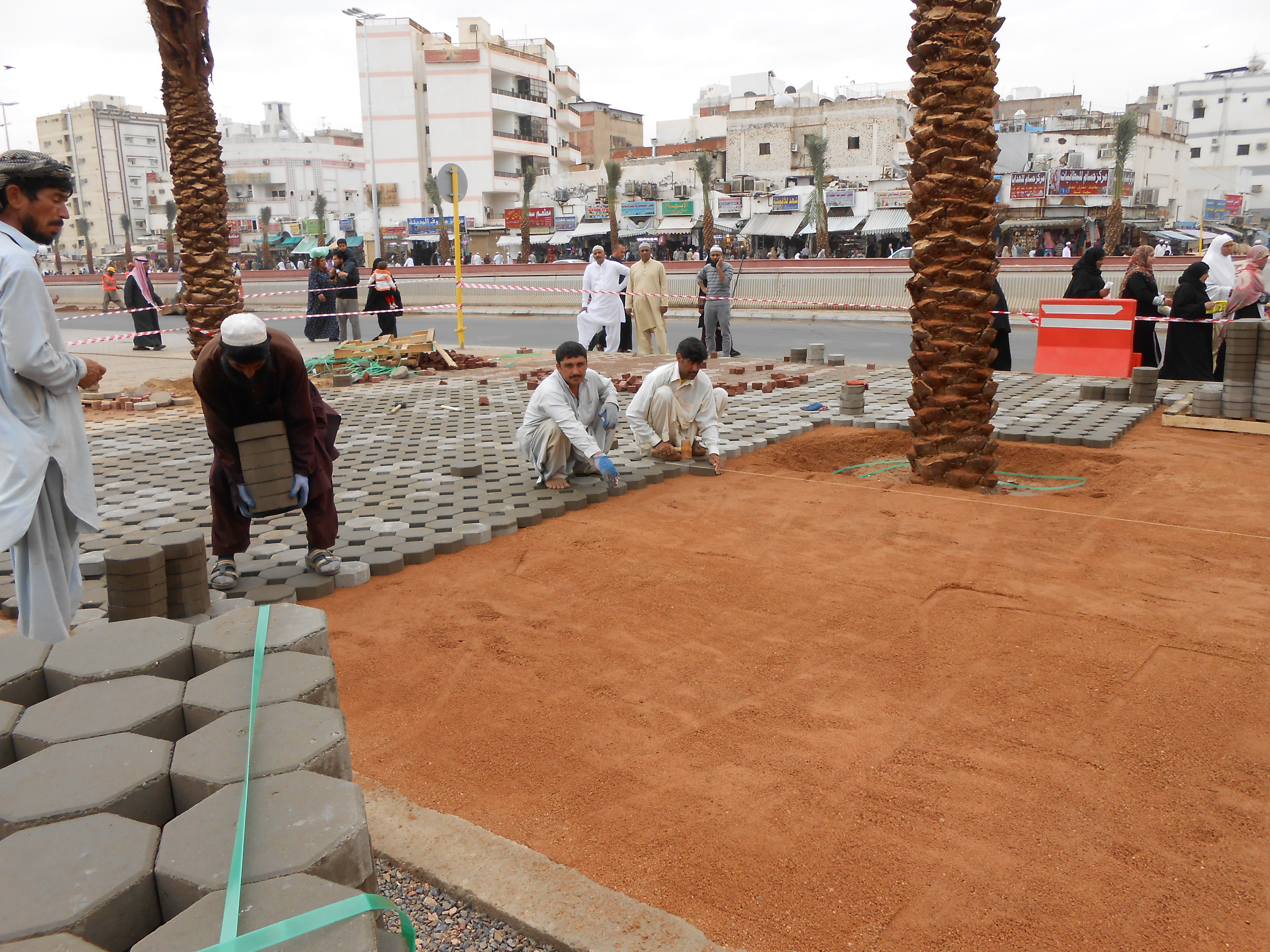
Pakistani labour at Al Masjid Nabawi (the Prophet's Mosque) in Medina

Foreign workers in Saudi Arabia (Arabic: العَمالَة الأَجْنَبِيَّة فِي السَعُودِيَّة, romanized: al-ʿamālah al-ʾāǧnabīyah fī as-Saʿūdīyah), began migrating to the country soon after crude oil was discovered in the late 1930s. Initially, the main influx was composed of Arab and Western technical, professional and administrative personnel, but subsequently substantial numbers came from South and Southeast Asia.

Saudi Arabia has become increasingly dependent on foreign labour, and although foreign workers remain present in technical positions, most are now employed in the agriculture, cleaning and domestic service industries. The hierarchy of foreign workers is often dependent on their country of origin; workers from Arab nations and western nations generally hold the highest positions not held by Saudis, and the lower positions are occupied by persons from Africa, and Southeast Asia. The Saudi government has faced criticism from legal bodies and employers over the treatment of foreign workers. Saudi Arabia deported thousands of Tigrayan migrants to Ethiopia after holding them unlawfully for six months to six years in formal and informal detention facilities across the kingdom. The Tigrayan migrants were brutally tortured while being unjustly held in Saudi prisons.

== Background and history ==
Saudi Arabia was one of the poorest and most undeveloped countries in the world when oil was discovered in the late 1930s. The country therefore needed foreign expertise and labour to exploit its vast oil reserves. As a result, in the years after World War II there was a growth in the numbers of foreign technical, professional and administrative personnel, mainly from other Middle Eastern countries but also supplied by Western oil companies, many of whom worked for ARAMCO (Arabian-American Oil Company). A much greater increase in the numbers of foreign workers came with the oil-price boom following the 1973 oil crisis. Infrastructure and development plans led to an influx of skilled and unskilled workers, principally Palestinians, Egyptians, Yemenis and others from Arab countries, but also Indians and Pakistanis, leading to a doubling of the Saudi population by 1985. Beginning in the early 1980s, South and East Asian countries, such as Thailand, Philippines, and South Korea, increasingly provided migrant workers.

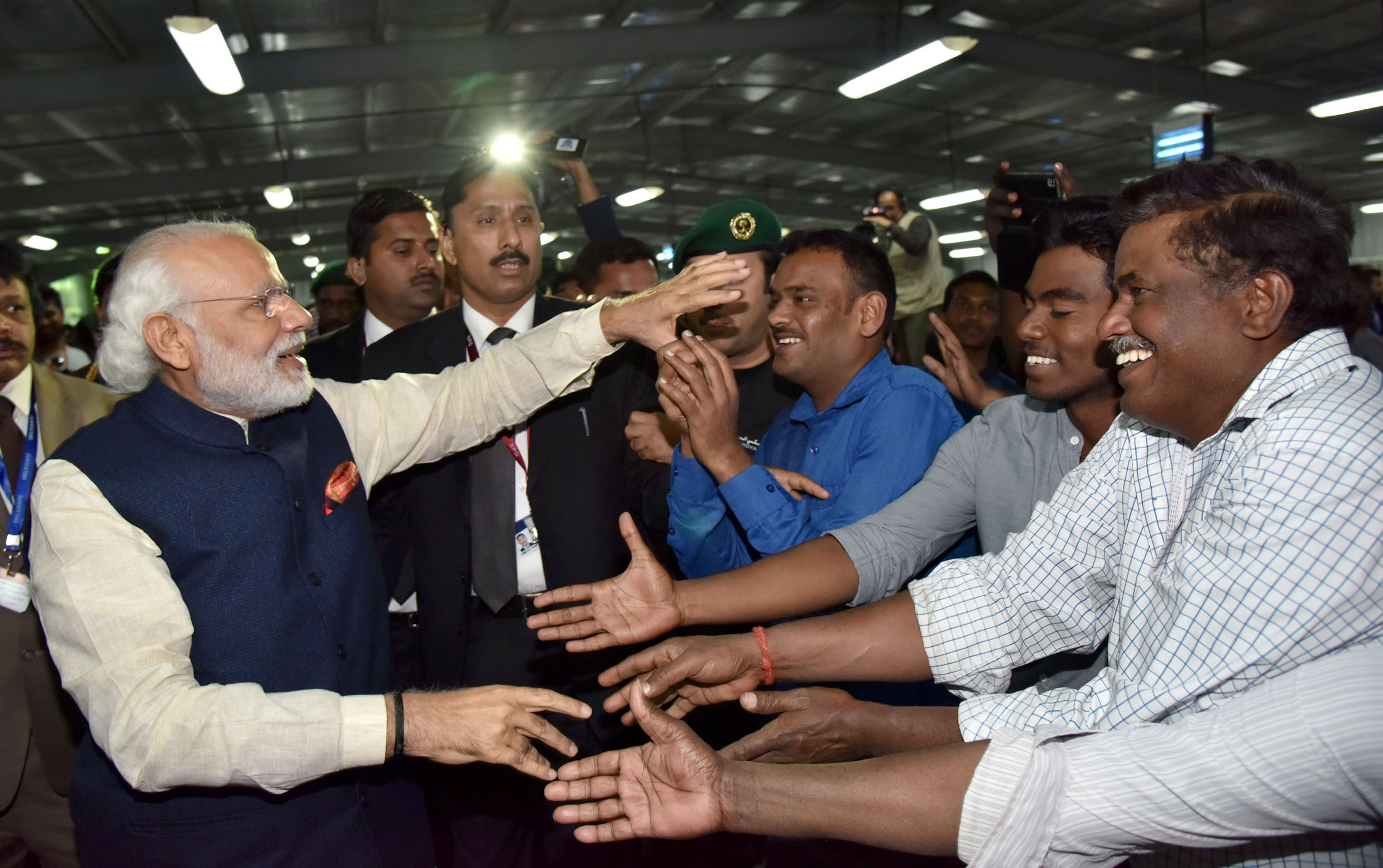
Indian workers at the Larsen & Toubro residential complex in Riyadh receiving a visit from their Prime Minister Narendra Modi (far left) in April 2016

From 1985, the declining oil price led to a decreased demand for foreign labour, resulting in a substantial drop in migration from Asia. However, at the same time, there was a significant increase of female "guest workers" from Sri Lanka, Bangladesh, Philippines and Indonesia who filled roles in the services sector – particularly in hotels and as domestic servants. The Gulf War of 1991 sparked a series of expulsions of guest workers suspected of disloyalty, including the removal of 800,000 Yemenis. The numbers of foreign workers reached a plateau in the 1990s, but from the end of the decade the inflow of migrants resumed its increase. According to official figures in 2012, foreign workers filled 66 per cent of jobs in Saudi Arabia, despite an official unemployment rate of 12 per cent amongst Saudis, and expatriates sent, on average, US$18 billion each year, in remittances to their home countries.

Although the country's reliance on foreign workers has been a concern to the Saudi government since the mid-1950s, the situation has persisted because of a reluctance by Saudis to take on menial work and a shortage of Saudi candidates for skilled jobs. This has, in part, been blamed on the Saudi education system, which has been criticized for its emphasis on religion and rote learning. The Saudi economy has, therefore, remained dependent on Westerners for expertise in specialised industries and on the Asian workforce for the construction industry as well as for menial and unskilled tasks. In response, since 1995 the Saudi government has initiated a policy of Saudization, replacing foreign workers with Saudi nationals. For example, in 2000, it was decreed that the work force of businesses with more than 20 employees must be at least 25% Saudi. In the private sector, there has been a reluctance to employ Saudis and Saudization is generally considered to have been a failure. Saudis themselves may be unwilling to take certain jobs, considering them to lack social value.

The Saudi government only recognises contracts for foreign workers written in Arabic. Where bilingual contracts are available, the Arabic language one is authoritative. The contracts, which must contain the terms of employment, are held in duplicate, one for the sponsor and one for the worker. Wages for foreign workers vary, depending on the position, although in general Saudis holding similar positions earn more.

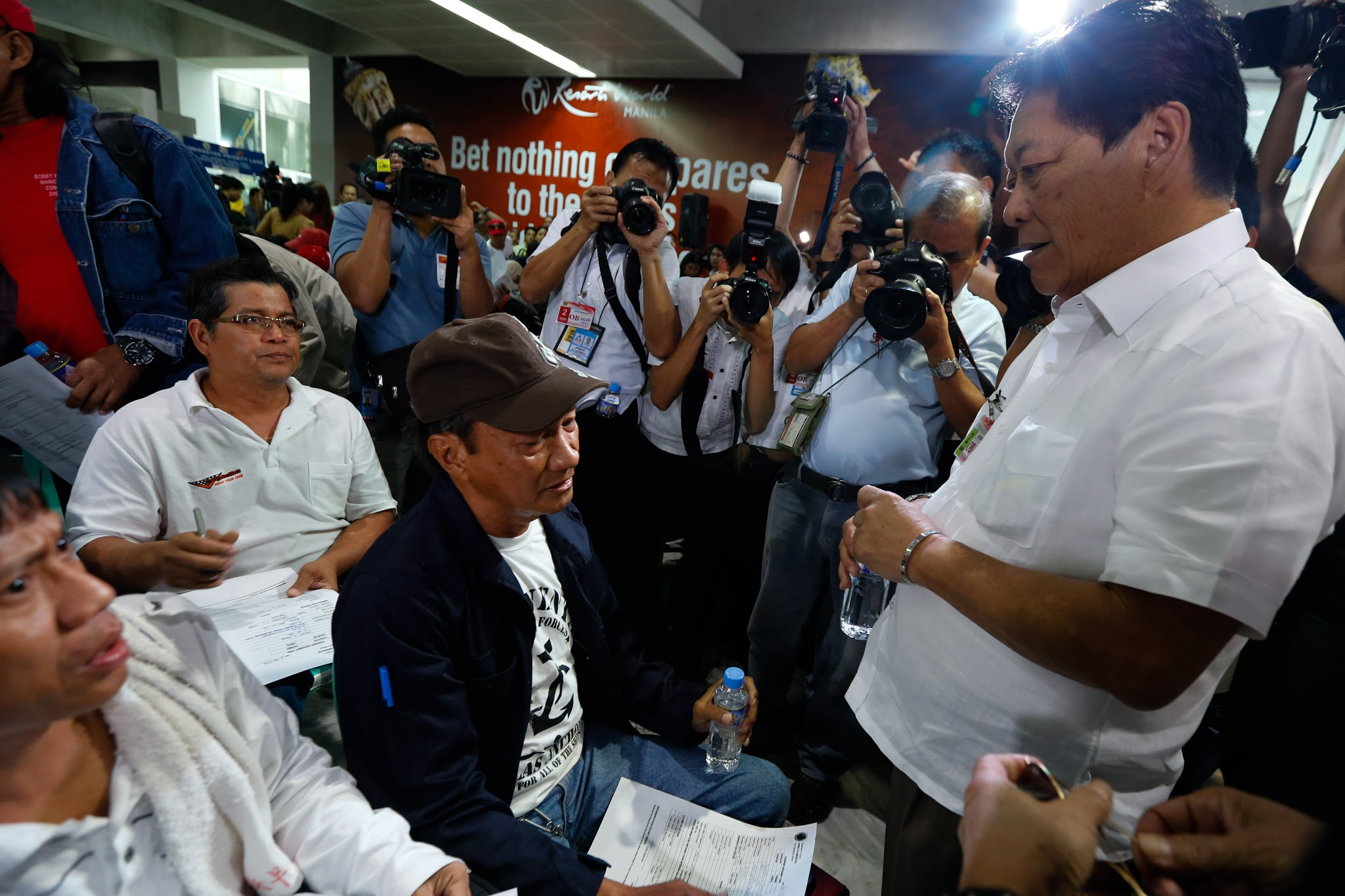
Philippines Labor Secretary Silvestre Bello III (right) speaking to a group of Filipino workers stationed in Saudi Arabia in 2016

There is currently no personal income tax in Saudi Arabia for either Saudi or foreign workers. Saudi workers and their employers must contribute to the social insurance system (which provides old age and disability benefits for citizens) but foreigners may not pay into or use this system, except for those from Gulf Cooperation Council countries.

== Composition and numbers ==
The 2010 edition of the Central Intelligence Agency's World Factbook estimated that non-nationals represented 5,576,076 out of a population of 25,731,776 in Saudi Arabia. However, official 2010 census figures stated that there were 8,429,401 expatriates out of a total population of 27,136,977 or roughly 31 per cent of the total. According to the United Nations (mid-year 2015, counted numbers — not estimates, including refugees) there were 10,185,945 foreign-origin migrants in Saudi Arabia.

Country		Population in KSA (source: UN DESA, 2015)	Other numbers
(Afghanistan)	Afghanistan	364,304	132,280 (2022)
(Bangladesh)	Bangladesh	967,223	2,600,000 (2022)
(Egypt)	Egypt	728,608	2,900,000 (2018)
(Ethiopia)	Ethiopia	124,347	750,000 (2023)
(India)	India	1,894,380	4,100,000 (2017)
(Indonesia)	Indonesia	1,294,035	1,500,000 (2022)
(Iraq)	Iraq	4,601	6,450 (2022)
(Jordan)	Jordan	182,152	204,205 (2022)
(Lebanon)	Lebanon	116,577	52,780 (2022)
(Myanmar)	Myanmar	202,720	163,720 (2022)
(Nepal)	Nepal	381,102	297,560 (2022)
(Pakistan)	Pakistan	1,123,260	2,640,000 (2023)
(United Kingdom)	United Kingdom		17,870 (2022)
(Palestine)	Palestine		250,000 (2007)
(Philippines)	Philippines	488,167	938,490 (2014)
(Sri Lanka)	Sri Lanka	400,734	84,790 (2022)
(Sudan)	Sudan	364,304	819,580 (2022)
(Syria)	Syria	623,247	449,310 (2022)
(Yemen)	Yemen	582,886	1,803,470 (2022)
	Westerners		±100,000 (2007)
Total		10,185,945	7,000,000 (2007)—13,114,971 (2019) (Note: 8,995,390 males and 4,119,581 females)

The results of the 2004 census indicates that only about 15 per cent of foreign workers are in the skilled category, with the remainder mostly working in agriculture, cleaning and domestic service. Country of origin has been an important factor in determining foreign workers' occupational roles in Saudi Arabia. Saudi businesses have traditionally adopted an ethnically defined hierarchical organisation. For example, a 2007 academic study of a Danish manufacturing company's Saudi subsidiary noted that a manager had to be European, a supervisor had to be Egyptian, Filipino employees often had technical roles, and south Asians, the lowest in the hierarchy, worked in production, while Indians, being an exceptional occupying both top positions and menial positions. Foreign workers' presence in Saudi Arabia tends to be transitory: only 3% remain in the country for more than six years.

=== Skilled workers ===
Some foreigners often live in compounds or gated communities, such as the Saudi Aramco compound at Dhahran Camp. However, many Westerners left the country in 2003 and 2004 following the terrorist attacks in Riyadh, Khobar and Yanbu. A significant number of U.S. workers are English teachers.

Additionally Egyptians have long migrated to Saudi Arabia to take up professional jobs such as doctors, nurses, teachers and engineers, as have Filipinos to work in the health, oil and manufacturing sectors.

Their presence however, has been criticized by Saudi citizens who complained that under-qualified Westerners occupied critical departments in major projects. The online abuse led to a crackdown by the General Authority of Media Regulation, summoning dozens of people due to "misleading content". Alqst, a UK-based human rights group, said that users were forced to delete their posts and warned not to repeat their actions. The group condemned the practice as an "escalating crackdown on freedom of expression in the country."

=== Domestic workers ===
According to The Guardian, as of 2013 there were more than half a million foreign-born domestic workers in Saudi Arabia. Most have backgrounds in poverty and come from Africa, the Indian subcontinent and Southeast Asia. To go to work in Saudi Arabia, they must often pay large sums to recruitment agencies in their home countries. The agencies then handle the necessary legal paperwork. Some falsify their dates of birth, allowing them easier access to the country.

== Premium Residency ==
In 2019, Saudi Arabia has introduced a new scheme known as the Premium Residency (informally Saudi Green Card) which grants expats the right to live, work and own business and property in the Kingdom without need for a sponsor. The unlimited duration premium residency is granted for $213,000 while the limited residency costs $26,660 per year.

== Restrictions ==
The kafala system, present in a number of other Arab countries, governs the conditions and processes for employment of foreigners. Under this system, all non-Saudis present in the country for employment purposes must have a sponsor, which is usually arranged months in advance. Unlike countries which recognize the Universal Declaration of Human Rights (which declares in part "Everyone has the right to leave any country, including his own") Saudi Arabia requires foreign workers to have their sponsor's permission to enter and leave the country, and denies exit to those with work disputes pending in court. Sponsors generally confiscate passports while workers are in the country; sometimes employers also hold passports of workers' family members. Workers from other Persian Gulf countries do not need a visa to enter and live in Saudi Arabia, except for Qatar. (See Qatar diplomatic crisis).

Foreign workers must be free of infectious disease, including HIV and tuberculosis. Infectious disease tests are conducted when the worker applies for their visa in their home country, and then must be conducted again once in Saudi Arabia to obtain the long-term iqama residency card.

In April 2016, the Saudi government published its Vision 2030, which proposed an extension of foreigners' ability to own real estate, and a new system for issuing permits:

"We will seek to improve living and working conditions for non-Saudis, by extending their ability to own real estate in certain areas, improving the quality of life, permitting the establishment of more private schools and adopting an effective and simple system for issuing visas and residence permits."

In 2019, a specialized Premium Residency program was put in place to facilitate these goals (see above).

Trade unions, strikes, and collective bargaining are banned for both Saudi citizens and foreigners alike. Political parties are also banned. Criminal prosecution of foreigners relies upon the country's Basic Law which recognizes sharia (Islamic law) and the Quran as the ultimate legal authorities.

== Abuse and scandals ==
Many domestic servants in Saudi Arabia are treated adequately, but there have been numerous cases of abuse. Foreign workers have been raped, exploited, under- or unpaid, physically abused, overworked and locked in their places of employment. The international organisation Human Rights Watch (HRW) describes these conditions as "near-slavery" and attributes them to "deeply rooted gender, religious, and racial discrimination". In many cases the workers are unwilling to report their employers for fear of losing their jobs or further abuse. Other forms of general discrimination, such as a lack of freedom of religion for non-Sunni Muslims, are also applicable.

Some American English teachers have complained they were not informed of a 90-day probation period.

According to a spokesperson from HRW, Saudi Arabian law does not provide strong legal protection for migrant workers and housemaids. As such, they face "arbitrary arrests, unfair trials and harsh punishments" and may falsely be accused of crime. Amnesty International reports that those charged are often unable to follow the court proceedings, as they are often unable to speak the language and are not given interpreters or legal counsel. Foreign workers have been charged with various crimes, including theft, murder and "black magic". After a worker is convicted and sentenced to death, in many cases the worker's home government is not notified. When the country's representatives are notified, it is often difficult for them to argue for a commutation of sentence. Efforts by the Indonesian government in 2011, for example, required the victims' families to grant clemency and be given diyya ("blood money") in the millions of riyal (Note: At September 2013 rates, this was equivalent to hundreds of thousands to millions of US dollars.) before the Saudi government would consider the case. As of January 2013, the majority of foreign workers held on death row in Saudi Arabia come from Indonesia.

These conditions have sparked condemnation both inside and outside of Saudi Arabia. In 2002, Grand Mufti Abdul-Azeez ibn Abdullaah Aal ash-Shaikh argued that Islam required employers to honour their contracts and not intimidate, blackmail or threaten their workers.

Several executions have sparked international outcries. In June 2011 Ruyati binti Satubi, an Indonesian maid, was beheaded for killing her employer's wife, reportedly after years of abuse. A video of the execution, posted online, prompted extensive criticism. In September 2011 a Sudanese migrant worker was beheaded for "sorcery", an execution which Amnesty International condemned as "appalling". In January 2013 a Sri Lankan maid named Rizana Nafeek was beheaded after she was convicted of murdering a child under her care, an occurrence which she attributed to the infant choking. The execution drew international condemnation of the government's practices and led Sri Lanka to recall its ambassador. These are not isolated cases. According to figures by Amnesty International, in 2010 at least 27 migrant workers were executed and, as of January 2013, more than 45 foreign maids were on death row awaiting execution.

In 2015, Saudi Arabia introduced reforms in an attempt to fix its laws and protect foreign workers.

Saudi Arabia was exposed by The Sunday Telegraph for detaining African migrants in a drive to control COVID-19. The newspaper received graphic mobile phone images, showing the miserable condition of the detained migrants. The images show evidence of their abuse, physical torture via pictures of injuries caused by beating and electrocution. A 16-year-old hanged to death following torture. Many of the migrants have committed suicide at the detention center while some died of heatstroke in the small detention rooms, housing hundreds of migrants.

According to Amnesty International, thousands of Ethiopian migrants, including pregnant women and children, were arbitrarily detained in harsh conditions across the kingdom since March 2020. Detainees didn't get adequate food, water, health care, sanitation facilities and clothes. The prison cells were severely overcrowded and prisoners were not allowed to go outside. The specific needs of pregnant and lactating women were also not fulfilled by the prison authorities and the new born babies, infants and teenagers were detained and kept in the same dire conditions as adults.

On 8 October 2020, based on the investigation led by The Telegraph, the European Parliament criticized Saudi Arabia for its treatment of Ethiopian migrants being held like slaves in COVID-19 detention camps. A footage captured on phones smuggled inside by the migrants showed thousands of men, women and children with scars from wounds of beating, torture and disfiguring skin infections.

Even after Saudi modified its sponsorship system in March 2021, it remains quite challenging to control the abuses that Overseas Filipino Workers (OFWs) face there. As stated by the Foreign Undersecretary for Migrant Workers' Affairs Sarah Lou Arriola, “While there are a lot of reforms in the Middle East, especially starting March 12, Saudi Arabia will have reforms on the kafala system and labour mobility, this still does not include the household service workers”. She further added that despite the reforms, there is always a disconnect between the practice and what's on paper.

Between 2022 and 2023, according to Human Rights Watch, Saudi border guards have used explosive weapons and shot hundreds of Ethiopian migrants who wanted to cross Saudi-Yemen barrier for work at close range, in a pattern that is widespread and systematic.

In 2025, Human Rights Watch reported that hundreds of workers employed by the manufacturing and supply company Sendan International. Some were employed by Aramco, Saudi Arabia's national oil company. They were left without pay for months, with some working undocumented or forced to return home on their own.

== See also ==
- International education in Saudi Arabia – the nation's educational infrastructure for the children of foreign workers
- Migrant workers in the Gulf Cooperation Council region
  - Treatment of South Asian labourers in the Gulf Cooperation Council region
