= Suicide of Fathima Latheef =

Suicide of an Indian college student

Fathima Latheef
- Born: 4 June 2001; Kilikollur, Kerala, India
- Died: 9 November 2019 (aged 18); Guindy, Chennai, Tamil Nadu, India
- Resting place: Kilikollur, Kerala, India
- Education: Yara International School; The Oxford School, Kollam
- Alma mater: Indian Institute of Technology Madras

Fathima Latheef (4 June 2001 – 9 November 2019) was an Indian teenager and a first-year post-graduate humanities student at Indian Institute of Technology Madras who had committed suicide in her hostel room on 9 November 2019. Her family and others had alleged that she ended her life because she had been discriminated against on the basis of her religion. She had named three professors for her death. An enquiry by Central Bureau of Investigation is ongoing regarding the case.

== Background ==
Hailing from the Randamkutty locality in Kilikollur, Kollam, Kerala, Fathima was raised in Riyadh, Saudi Arabia with her twin-sister Aysha by her father Abdul and mother Sajitha. She attended Yara International School until 9th standard. Upon returning to India in 2015, she enrolled at The Oxford School in Umayanalloor, attending for one year before pursuing higher education in a state-affiliated curriculum school. She enrolled as a first-year student of the humanities stream (a five-year integrated MA programme) offered at the Indian Institute of Technology in Madras, and was widely described as an intelligent and academically competent student. Fathima had also been accepted to Banaras Hindu University in Varanasi after winning the Humanities entrance exam, though her mother, reluctant to send her due to news of mob lynchings in the northern states, persuaded on her daughter into accepting IIT Madras's offer. Fathima began her studies at the institute on July 29, 2019. Her parents reported that she felt the IIT campus atmosphere was oppressive.

== Suicide ==
Fathima was discovered hanging from the ceiling of her hostel room around noon on November 9, 2019 by the hostel warden. According to the authorities, she was alleged to have attempted suicide the night before. Around 11 a.m. on November 9, IIT administration notified her family of her death. The body was taken to the Royapettah Government Hospital for a post-mortem and a charge of unnatural death was filed with the Chennai City Police (Kotturpuram).

According to the students, Fathima's hostel mates received a phone call from her family about 11.30 a.m., stating that she had been inaccessible on her phone since the morning. According to the students, the chief of wardens and the head of the humanities department helped the warden in dispersing students gathered at the hostel. In the absence of the police or any witnesses, students at the scene claimed that staff members investigated Fathima's room, which had become a crime scene by that time.

== Communal discrimination ==
Two days before her death, she told her father, who was working in Saudi Arabia at the time, through video chat that her name revealed her Muslim origin, which her mother was worried about. Her father alleged immediately after his daughter's death that he had evidence to prove that Fathima was being harassed by some professors in the department of Humanities and Social Sciences. He refused believe her suicide was due to academic pressure.

My name itself is the problem, vappichi

— Fathima Latheef to her family,

Her father said that Fathima had previously talked openly about being harassed by the professor she had blamed in her notes, calling him a "bad guy" and being tangibly scared about attending his classes; this fear was so great that she wasn't able to get her mark sheet from him, having her friend get it for her instead. Latheef further claimed that he suspected the professor was discriminating against Fathima because she had continuously excelled in all of her classes.

Three days after the incident, her father demanded a fair probe into the incident, alleging that harassment and caste discrimination by the professors pushed his daughter to take the extreme step. He also stated that they had retrieved a suicide note from Fathima's phone, where she allegedly blamed three professors from her department for her death. Her family members also alleged that she had faced communal discrimination from some teachers and students on the campus.

== Inquiry ==
There were rumours that Fathima had scored low marks in a certain subject and was thus upset. Apparently, Fathima had scored 13 out of 20 marks in an Internal Assessment in Logic but believed she deserved more. She had approached the Head of the department for a review. The professor reviewed it and sent the paper back the professor she had name on her phone, who had evaluated the paper. She was the topper in the paper; the student in second place in the test had scored 11 marks and the one in third place had scored 9. The professor had apparently asked Fathima to meet him on Monday, 11 November, but Fathima was found dead in her hostel room on Saturday. The family suspects something happened which had impacted Fathima drastically.

=== Suicide note ===
When her twin sister Aysha had gone to the Kotturpuram Police Station, she found Fathima's phone on the table. Upon charging the phone, she noticed there was no lock, and the aforementioned text was her home screen. This screenshot blamed Professor Sudharshan Padmanabhan for Fathima's actions, and was widely circulated on social media as the alleged suicide note. Another note, purported to have been written by her, was also circulated, which blames two other professors. A suicide note on her mobile phone and tablet claimed the three professors had harassed her.

Sudarshan Padmanabhan is the cause of my death. P.S. Check Samsung notes.

— Text of a screenshot Abdul Latheef shared with media.,

The Forensic Department confirmed the authenticity of the suicide note and other notes typed by Fathima. It was confirmed that Fathima had written the notes before she killed herself and that they were not edited by anybody else.

=== Central Crime Branch ===
In November 2019, The Central Crime Branch in Chennai concluded that there was no evidence against the professors alleged to have instigated her to take her life.

=== Central Bureau of Investigation ===
Fathima's family and a delegation of MPs visited Union Home Minister Amit Shah and delivered over a memorandum signed by 41 MPs demanding a fair investigation. The case was forwarded to the CBI in November 2020. Her family raised several allegations following her death, citing the fact that the screensaver on her phone and notes saved on it had named the people responsible for her death. However, with the Kotturpuram police insisting that no suicide note had been found, her father claimed that the Tamil Nadu police were attempting to sabotage the inquiry.

After the first round of police investigation wherein it was stated that there was no evidence against the Professors, the matter was shifted to the Central Crime Branch. The Central Crime Branch came to a conclusion that there was no evidence against the Professors or the other students named. This conclusion was reportedly arrived at after interviewing over 100 people including the 19-year-old's friends, family and IIT staff. Despite this report however, investigation in the case will continue as the CBI had taken over the case.

The CBI has registered a First Information Report (FIR) based on the FIR registered by the Tamil Nadu police.

The CBI also concluded that there is no evidence against Professor Sudarsan Padmanabhan or the other two professors at IIT Madras. The Central Bureau of Investigation (CBI) has filed a final report closing the investigation into the death of 19-year-old Fathima Latheef at IIT-Madras hostel, concluding that it was a case of death by suicide due to homesickness and recording that the student had psychological issues, said sources.

== Reaction ==
The students of Delhi University issued a statement demanding justice for Latheef and condemned the alleged caste and religious discrimination.

MK Stalin demanded a time-bound, fair, transparent, and independent probe into the matter. In a statement, he stated that it was a shame to hear the victim's mother say her daughter was belittled and subjected to stress. He also stated “It's time we avoid saffronisation of educational institutions.”

An autonomous student body at IIT-M, the Ambedkar Periyar Study Circle, published a statement condemning IIT-Madras' "brahminical hegemony". The group has demanded a "fair probe" into Fathima's death. Many students accused IIT-Madras of being "anti-Muslim", "anti-minority", and of discriminating against students from marginalized communities, such as Adivasis, Other Backward Classes, and Dalits.

“My college is a hostile space that stinks of elitism, casteism, classism, and most notably Islamophobia,” said Alfiya, a Humanities student, claiming. “This university, especially the department of Humanities and Social Sciences, is rife with anti-Muslim and anti-caste sentiments.” She stated that one of the staff members asked her, 'Why are Muslims and Christians labelled minorities when their populations are vast, yet Brahmins make up only 2% of the Indian population?'.

On 18 November 2019, students of the institute sat on a hunger strike demanding the management constitute an external expert panel to survey the overall mental well-being of students. They also demanded setting up a Grievance Redressal Cell for each department and conducting an internal probe into the allegations made by Fathima's family. The management accepted the first two demands and the students called off the strike. However, when the students met the director on 21 November, he told them the institute cannot form an internal probe committee as an investigation was already underway by the authorities.
