= International Indian Public School, Riyadh =

International Indian Public School Riyadh

Location
- As-Sulaimaniyah, Riyadh; Saudi Arabia
- Coordinates: 24°41′27″N 46°42′17″E

Information
- Former name: SEVA School (1995–1998)
- School type: Private
- Opened: 1995; 31 years ago
- School board: Central Board of Secondary Education
- Educational authority: Ministry of Education, Saudi Arabia
- Chairperson: Mrs. Amandeep Kaur(2024-2026)
- Principal In-Charge: Mr. Mohammad Arshad Ali Khan
- Grades: K–12
- Gender: Co-education (till GRADE V); Gender-isolated (from sixth grade)
- Age range: 4 to 18
- Education system: Indian
- Language: English
- Affiliation: CBSE Gulf Sahodaya
- Website: iipsr.edu.sa

International Indian Public School Riyadh (IIPS-R), formerly SEVA School is a K–12 gender-isolated English-medium community-based international school in as-Sulaimaniyah, Riyadh, Saudi Arabia. Established in 1995, it primarily serves the Indian diaspora of the city and provides Indian curriculum prescribed by the Central Board of Secondary Education. It is a member of the CBSE Gulf Sahodaya and is approved by the Ministry of Education, Government of Saudi Arabia.

== History ==
International Indian Public School was established in 1995 as SEVA School. In 1998, its name was renamed to its current name. In 2012, Imtiaz Ahmed, an area sales manager for Saudi Scaffolding Factory was elected as the new chairman of the school. In the same year, Ali Hasan Adnan, a student from the school bagged a prestigious scholarship from the Indian Ministry of Science and Technology to pursue his higher education. In 2015, the school organized a science exhibition on the birth anniversary of former Indian president APJ Abdul Kalam. In 2016, the school honored around 200 of its students for its outstanding performance and for winning various positions in diverse competitions including sports. In 2019 Mr Salman Khalid took over the charge of Chairman with following members: Dr Farook Badiuddin,Dr Rashid, Dr Pervez, Mr Sudhakar and Mrs Shalini

== See also ==
- List of schools in Saudi Arabia
- Yara International School
