= Non-Resident Indians in Saudi Arabia =

People of Indian birth or origin who reside in Saudi Arabia

Indians in Saudi Arabia
الهنود في السعودية (Arabic)
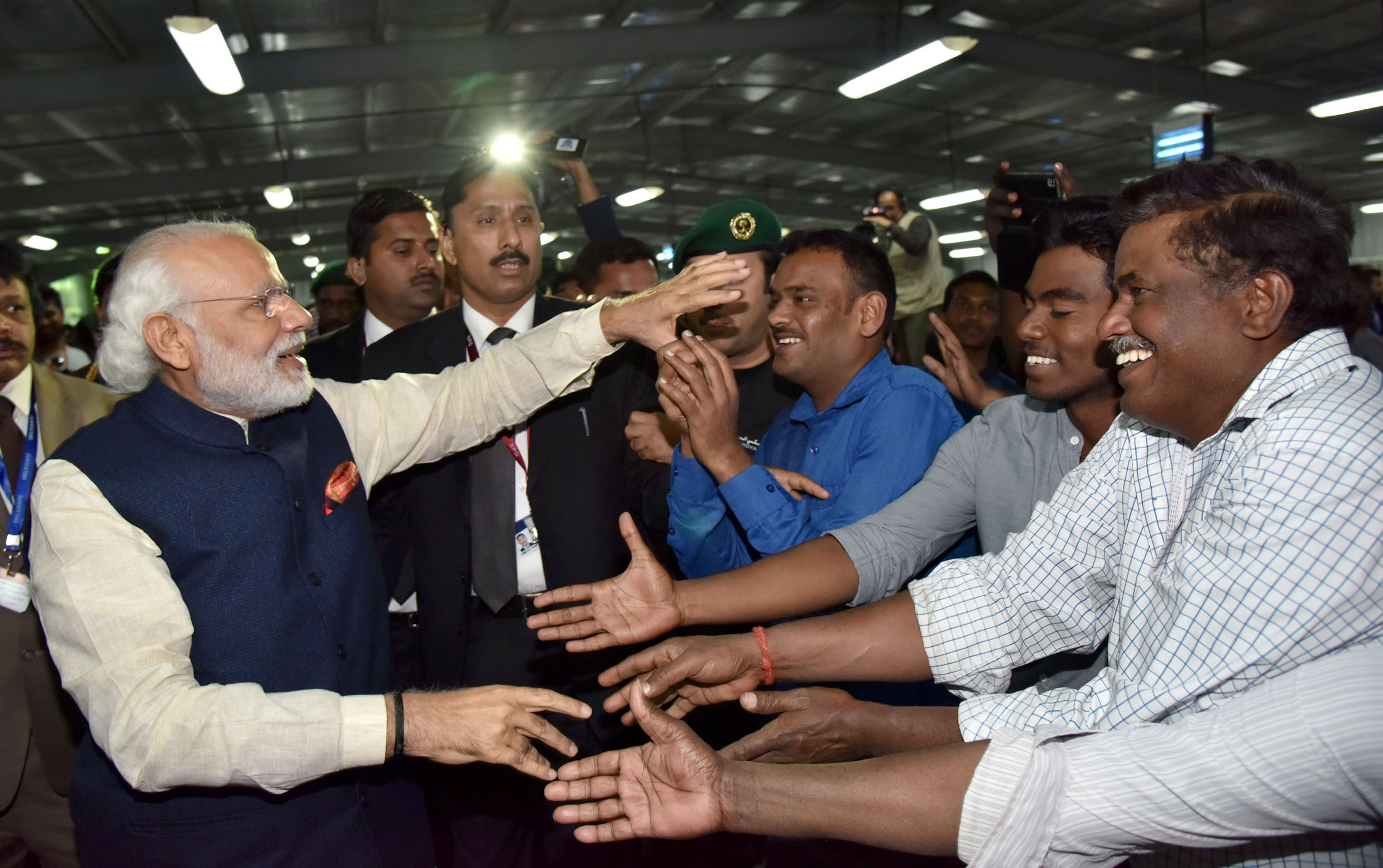
- Indian workers at the Larsen & Toubro residential complex in Riyadh receiving a visit from their Prime Minister Narendra Modi (far left) in April 2016

Total population
- 1,494,947 (2023 census)

Regions with significant populations
- Riyadh, Jeddah, Dammam, Jubail, Jizan

Languages
- Arabic • English • Malayalam • Telugu • Urdu • Hindi • Kannada • Tulu • Marathi • Rajasthani • Sindhi • Gujarati · Punjabi · Tamil

Religion
- Majority: Hinduism • Islam; Minority: Sikhism • Christianity • Jainism • Buddhism • Zoroastrianism • Baháʼí • Irreligion

Related ethnic groups
- Indian diaspora Indian Saudis

Non-Resident Indians (NRIs) in Saudi Arabia (Arabic: الهنود في السعودية, romanized: al-Hunūd fī as-Saʿūdīyah) are the largest community of expatriates in the country, with most of them coming from the states of Andhra Pradesh, Jharkhand, West Bengal, Karnataka, Kerala, Maharashtra, Tamil Nadu, Telangana and most recently, Bihar, Uttar Pradesh and Gujarat.

== Overview ==
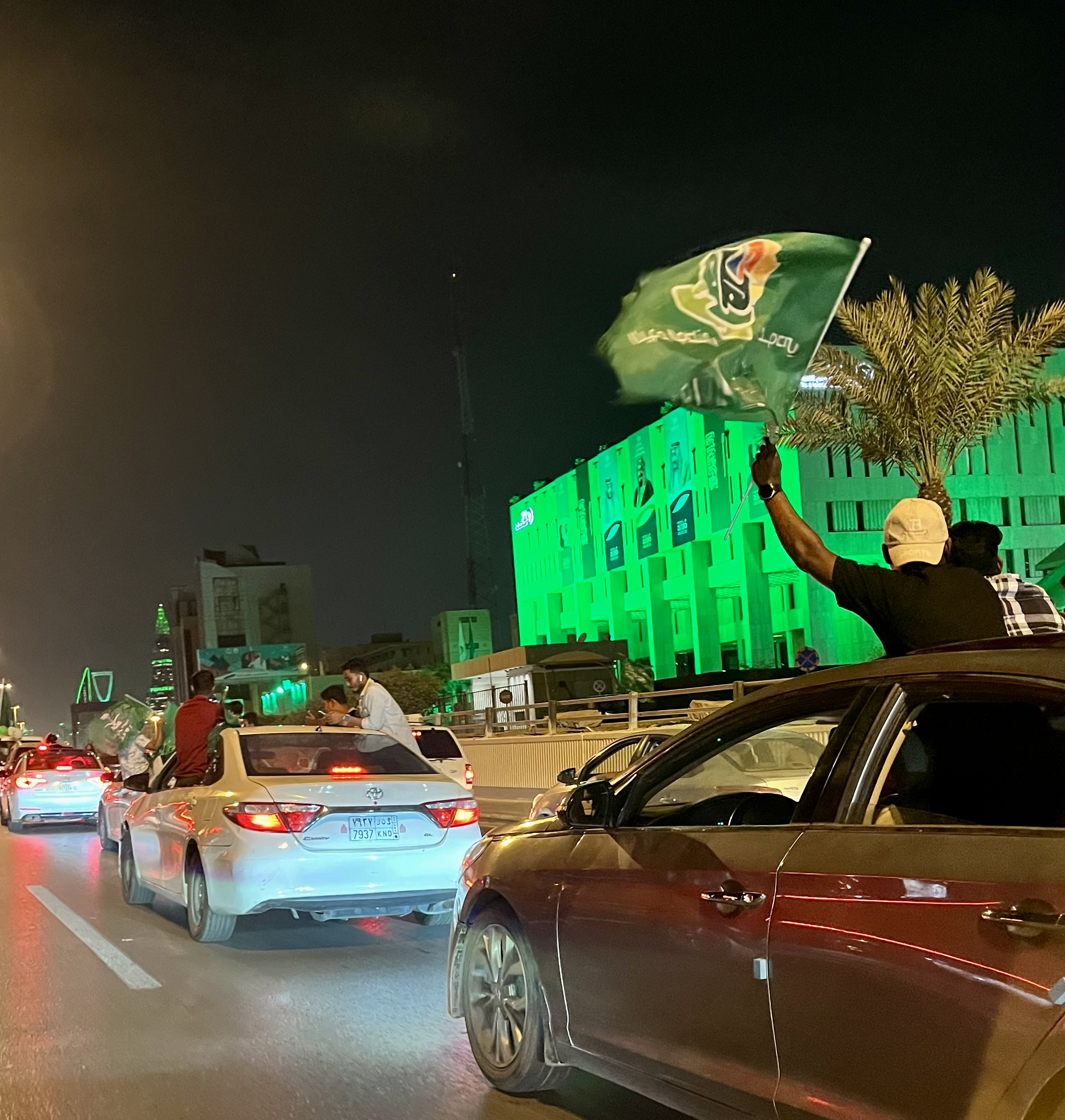
Indian schoolboys taking part in the 94th Saudi National Day celebrations in Riyadh, 2024

Indians as migrant workers first began to arrive in modern-day Saudi Arabia in relatively small numbers from the British Raj soon after the discovery of oil in 1938, but their migration numbers skyrocketed exponentially after the 1973 energy crisis and subsequent oil boom. However, migration to Saudi Arabia dropped dramatically after reaching its peak in 2014 due to the introduction of the Nitaqat scheme in 2011, the acceleration of the 2010s oil glut by early 2016, and the launch of Saudi Vision 2030.

== History ==
India and Saudi Arabia signed an agreement to manage and organize the recruitment of domestic workers in January 2014. Between then and April 2016, 500,000 Indians moved to Saudi Arabia for employment. The agreement includes a provision which stipulates that sponsors must pay a guarantee of US$2,500 for each Indian worker they recruit.

== Demographics ==
The following table shows the estimated population of Indians in Saudi Arabia since 1975.

Year	Population
1975	34,500
1979	60,000
1983	110,000
1987	190,000
1991	251,000
1999	500,000
2000	570,000
2004	760,000
2015	1,100,000
2017	4,100,000
2022	1,384,476
2023	1,494,947

== Education ==
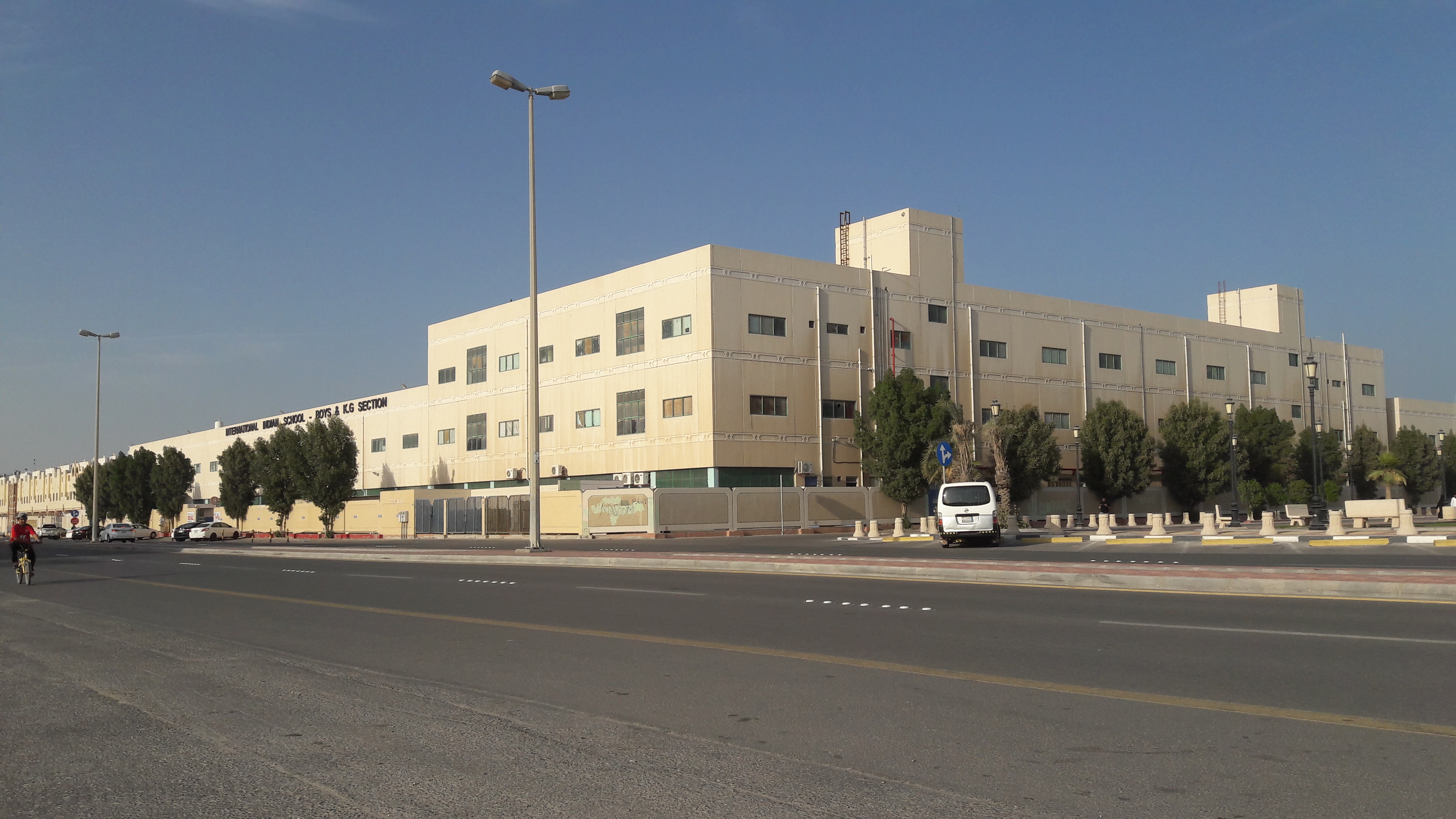
International Indian School, Dammam

Indian curriculum schools in Saudi Arabia include:

=== Dammam ===
- International Indian School, Dammam (Largest school in Saudi Arabia and the MENA)
- Dunes International School
- Al Khozama International School

=== Riyadh ===
- International Indian School, Riyadh (First school to serve Indian diaspora {est.1982} )
- New Middle East International School, Riyadh
- International Indian Public School, Riyadh
- Al-Yasmin International School, Riyadh
- Al Alia International Indian School
- Yara International School

=== Jeddah ===
- Talal International School, Jeddah
- International Indian School Jeddah

=== Buraidah ===
- International Indian School Buraidah

=== Jubail ===
- International Indian School, Al-Jubail

=== Taif ===
- International Indian School Taif

== See also ==
- Indian Saudis
- India – Saudi Arabia relations
- Foreign workers in Saudi Arabia
- Migrant workers in the Gulf Cooperation Council region
  - Treatment of South Asian labourers in the Gulf Cooperation Council region
