= Imam Mohammad Ibn Saud Islamic University Al Batha Campus =

University campus in Riyadh, Saudi Arabia

Female Student Study Center of Imam Mohammad Ibn Saud Islamic University
- مركز دراسة الطالبات – فرع البطحاء
- Type: Satellite campus of Imam Mohammad Ibn Saud Islamic University
- Active: 1984–2012
- Parent institution: Imam Mohammad Ibn Saud Islamic University
- Location: King Faisal Road, ad-Dirah, Riyadh, Saudi Arabia; 24°37′44″N 46°43′2″E
- Campus: 9,890 square metres (2.44 acres); Suburban
- Website: مكتبة مركز دراسة الطالبات - فرع البطحاء

The Female Student Study Center – Al Batha Branch (Arabic: مركز دراسة الطالبات – فرع البطحاء, romanized: Markaz Dirāsah aṭ-Ṭālibāt – Farʿ al-Baṭʼḥāʾ) was one of the three women-only satellite campuses of Imam Mohammad Ibn Saud Islamic University in ad-Dirah, Riyadh, Saudi Arabia, active from 1984 to 2012. The site since 2013 is the campus of Yara International School.

Established in 1984, the campus offered courses at undergraduate, postgraduate and doctorate levels in fields such as Islamic studies, mass media, Arabic literature and social psychology. Its premises were handed over to Yara International School after the relocation of students and faculty to the newly built King Abdullah City for Female Students in 2012.

== History ==
The Female Student Study Center in Al Batha, Riyadh was established in 1984 alongside al-Malaz and al-Nafal branches during the reign of King Fahd as a women-exclusive satellite campus of Imam Mohammad Ibn Saud Islamic University to promote female education in Saudi Arabia. The first department to be established was the department of Library and Information, and then later on scientific departments were made that offered degrees at undergraduate, postgraduate and at doctorate levels in the fields of arts, science, Islamic studies, mass media, Arabic literature and social psychology.

=== 2005 Fire accident ===
On 16 May 2005 at 7:05 am (UTC+03:00), a fire accident occurred due to burning of one of the internal circuit breakers. At least three students and a supervisor suffered from minor suffocation and were rushed to the hospital by Red Crescent, of which two cases were transferred to Al-Iman General Hospital in Riyadh whereas 3 firefighting units, 4 rescue teams and an evacuation squad from the Saudi Civil Defense were mobilized and traffic police stopped the vehicles surrounding the premises, making it easy for rescue team to evacuate the premises. Later next day, Riyadh Governor Prince Salman and Deputy Governor Prince Sattam followed up on the incident and directed all educational institutes to enhance their fire protection system.

== 2012 Relocation to King Abdullah City for Female Students ==
In January 2006, King Abdullah laid down the foundation for the construction of a 2 billion riyals worth King Abdullah City for Female Students in the western-part of the campus of Imam Mohammad Ibn Saud Islamic University. The relocation of the students from the satellite campuses to the new building gradually began in 2011 and was expected to be completed by early 2012 but was delayed till mid of 2012 due to lack of safety tests in the new buildings. After the completion of relocation, the premises were handed over to Yara International School from the new academic year.
