= Delta Schools =

- مدارس دلتا
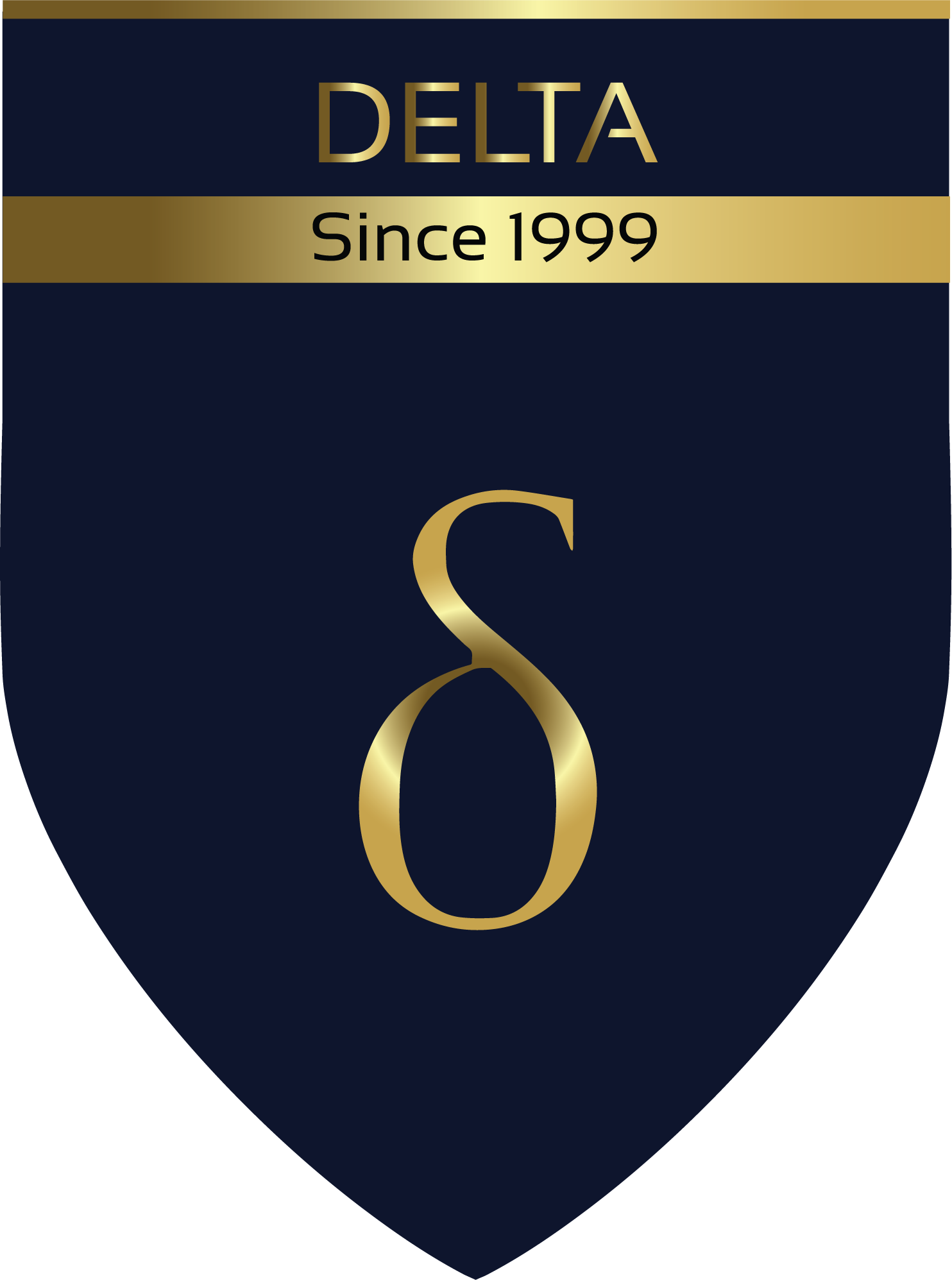

Location
- 2930، 6996 الحفصيون Al-Muruj District الرياض 12281 2930; Riyadh, 12281 2930; Saudi Arabia
- Coordinates: 24°45′19″N 46°39′38″E

Information
- Former name: Delta Schools مدارس دلتا
- Type: Private
- Motto: Firm Steps Towards a Promising Future
- Established: 1999; 27 years ago
- Grades: K–12
- Campus size: 25,000 m^{2} (6.2 acres)
- Accreditation: Cognia
- Website: delta.edu.sa

Delta Schools (Arabic: مدارس دلتا) is a private school located in Riyadh, Saudi Arabia. Established in 1999, it is a primary and secondary school for girls and boys, operating on a 25,000 m^{2} (6.2-acre) campus.

The school is accredited by Cognia (formerly known as AdvancED), the largest institution that supervises international curriculum. The school has also gained an excellency award from the Saudi Arabian Ministry of Education and is classified as an-A grade school for meeting their criteria in teaching and learning. Delta Schools has successfully integrated digital learning in all subjects to sustain a global standard that adheres to the development of modern education.
