= Al Nafal (Riyadh) =

Al-Nafal حي النفل
- Neighbourhood
- Location within Saudi Arabia Location within Asia
- Coordinates: 24.78011167192293°N 46.67369551577138°E
- Country: Saudi Arabia
- City: Riyadh

Government
  - Body: Baladiyah al-Shemal

Language
  - Official: Arabic
- PIN: 13312

Al-Nafal (Arabic: حَيّ النَفْل, romanized: ḥaī an-nafl), pronounced as an-Nafal, is a subject of Baladiyah al-Shemal and a residential neighborhood in northern Riyadh, Saudi Arabia. Spanned across 3.96 square kilometers, it is bordered by Northern Ring Road to the south whereas shares proximity with al-Ghadir neighborhood to the west and al-Wadi neighborhood to the east.
