= Al Shamal Sub-Municipality =

Al-Shamal Sub-Municipality بلدية الشمال
- Baladiyah
- Country: Saudi Arabia
- City: Riyadh
- Boroughs: List: al-Rabi an-Nada an-Nafal as-Sahafa al-Khair al-Qirawan al-Falah Imam Mohammad Ibn Saud Islamic University al-Aqiq al-Wadi al-Ghadir al-Aarid an-Narjis Banban al-Yasmeen Hittin al-Malqa
- Website: shimal.alriyadh.gov.sa

Al-Shamal Sub-Municipality (Arabic: بلدية الشمال, romanized: Baladīyah al-Šamāl) is one of the 16 baladiyahs of Riyadh, Saudi Arabia. Spanned across 448 square kilometers, it includes 18 districts and neighborhoods, including Banban, al-Khair, Hittin and the premises of Imam Mohammad Ibn Saud Islamic University.

== See also ==
- Al Nafal, Riyadh
