= King Faisal Street (Riyadh) =

Street in downtown Riyadh, Saudi Arabia

King Faisal Road
- Al-Wazir Street
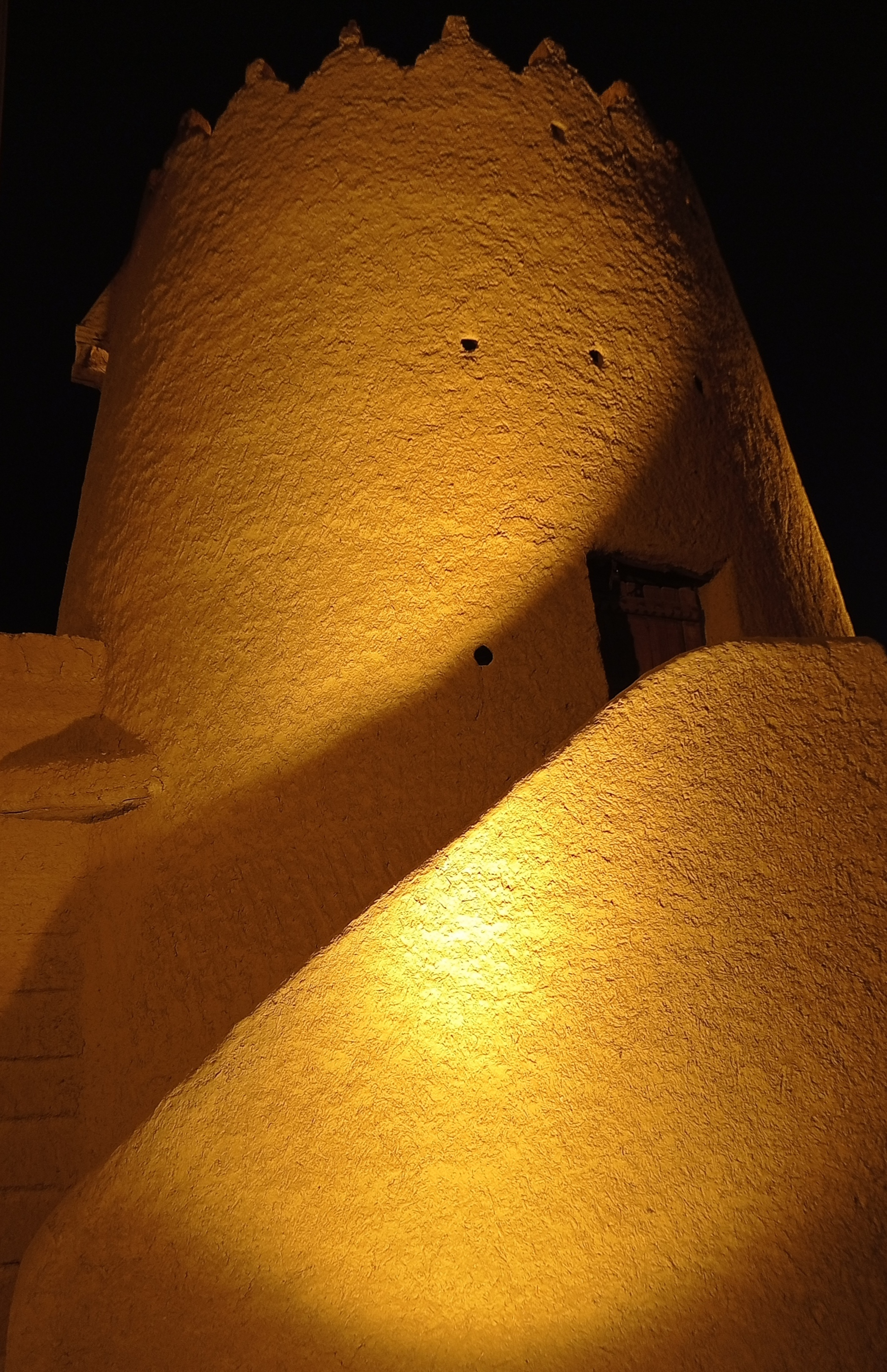
- Bab al-Thumairi on King Faisal Road, 2023
- Native name: شارع الملك فيصل (Arabic)
- Owner: Ministry of Transport, Saudi Arabia
- Location: Riyadh, Saudi Arabia
- Coordinates: 24°38′28″N 46°42′52″E

King Faisal Street (Arabic: شارع الملك فيصل), formerly al-Wazir Street (Arabic: شارع الوزير), is a 5 km historic and commercial street in southern Riyadh, Saudi Arabia, running from the east of al-Bateha neighborhood to al-Murabba via Jabrah and ad-Dirah. It was the first road built following the dismantling of the city walls in 1950, whereas the name 'al-Wazir' was derived from the nickname of the country's first finance minister, Abdullah bin Suleiman al-Hamdan, who was better known as Wazīr Kullī Shaīʾ (transl. minister for everything) and played a central role in the road's construction. It was later renamed after King Faisal. The street was once a preferred destination for commercial activity in the city and was also a bustling marketplace for imported and domestic goods.

== Landmarks ==
- Yara International School
