= Imam Mohammad Ibn Saud Islamic University Al Malaz Campus =

Saudi Arabian women's college (1984–2012)

Female Student Study Center of Imam Mohammad Ibn Saud Islamic University
- مركز دراسة الطالبات – فرع الملز
- Type: Satellite campus of Imam Mohammad Ibn Saud Islamic University
- Active: 1984–2012
- Parent institution: Imam Mohammad Ibn Saud Islamic University
- Location: Dhahran Street, Al-Malaz, Riyadh, Saudi Arabia; 24.65596°N 46.73626°E
- Campus: Suburban
- Website: مكتبة مركز دراسة الطالبات - فرع الملز

The Female Student Study Center – Al Malaz Branch (Arabic: مركز دراسة الطالبات – فرع الملز, romanized: Markaz Dirāsah aṭ-Ṭālibāt – Farʿ al-Malaz) was one of the three women-only satellite campuses of Imam Mohammad Ibn Saud Islamic University in al-Malazz, Riyadh, Saudi Arabia, active from 1984 to 2012.

Established in 1984, the campus offered courses at undergraduate, postgraduate and doctorate levels in fields such as computer science, Islamic law, social science, human resource management and natural science. The students and faculty were relocated to the newly built King Abdullah City for Female Students in 2012 and thus, disbanding the campus.

== History ==
The Female Student Study Center in al-Malaz, Riyadh was established in 1984 alongside al-Batha and al-Nafal branches during the reign of King Fahd as one of three women-exclusive satellite campuses of Imam Mohammad Ibn Saud Islamic University to promote female education in Saudi Arabia. the campus offered courses at undergraduate, postgraduate and doctorate levels in fields such as computer science, Islamic law, social science and natural science.

== 2012 relocation to King Abdullah City for Female Students ==
In June 2001, Al Jazirah reported that residents living at Dhahran Street complained of overcrowding and excess emission of exhaust gas by vehicles due to the location of campus in the residential area. The column urged the authorities to take concrete steps to resolve the issue.

In January 2006, King Abdullah laid down the foundation for the construction of the 2 billion riyal King Abdullah City for Female Students in the western-part of the campus of Imam Mohammad Ibn Saud Islamic University. The relocation of the students from the satellite campuses to the new building gradually began in 2011 and was expected to be completed by early 2012 but was delayed till mid of 2012 due to lack of safety tests in the new buildings.
