= Saad National Schools =

- (Saudi Arabia) Khobar; Saudi Arabia

Information
- Type: Private
- Established: 1995
- Website: www.saadschools.com/

Saad National Schools (SNS) are based in Al-Khobar, in the Kingdom of Saudi Arabia. The school was established in 1995 and was inaugurated two years later under the patronage of HRH Prince Mohammad bin Fahd Bin Abdulaziz Al-Saud. The goal of the school is to help ensure that local children receive the best opportunities possible, in addition to an education that completely prepares them for the future. In 2000, a similar institution was established for girls, with the latter eventually achieving international accreditation.

== Ethos ==
The governing principles of both schools are "excellence" and "opportunity". There is a particular emphasis on the creation of an interactive and participative environment that enables students to flourish.

== Curriculum ==
While the SNS educational programmes fully implement the Saudi Ministry of Education's core curriculum, both schools also include a number of further subjects, activities and disciplines that aim to offer a broader range of opportunities to students. Additional subjects include French, mathematics and science, all taught in English. Pupils are also encouraged to participate in a broad range of physical activities, including swimming, horse riding and martial arts.

External Recognition:

- May 1998: International Certificate for Quality awarded by the Canadian Quality Institute, as part of ISO 9002 accreditation.
- 1999: SNS ranked third best private school in Saudi Arabia by the Ministry of Education. The following year the school was ranked first.
- 2001: SNS granted a Letter of Distinction by the Minister of Education.
- 2004: Saad National School for Boys achieved accreditation from the Commission on International and Trans-Regional Accreditation (CITA), which evaluates more than 32,000 public and private educational institutions across the globe.
- 2008: Saad National School for Girls achieved accreditation from the Commission on International and Trans-Regional Accreditation (CITA).
