= Treatment of South Asian labourers in the Gulf Cooperation Council region =

Human rights concern

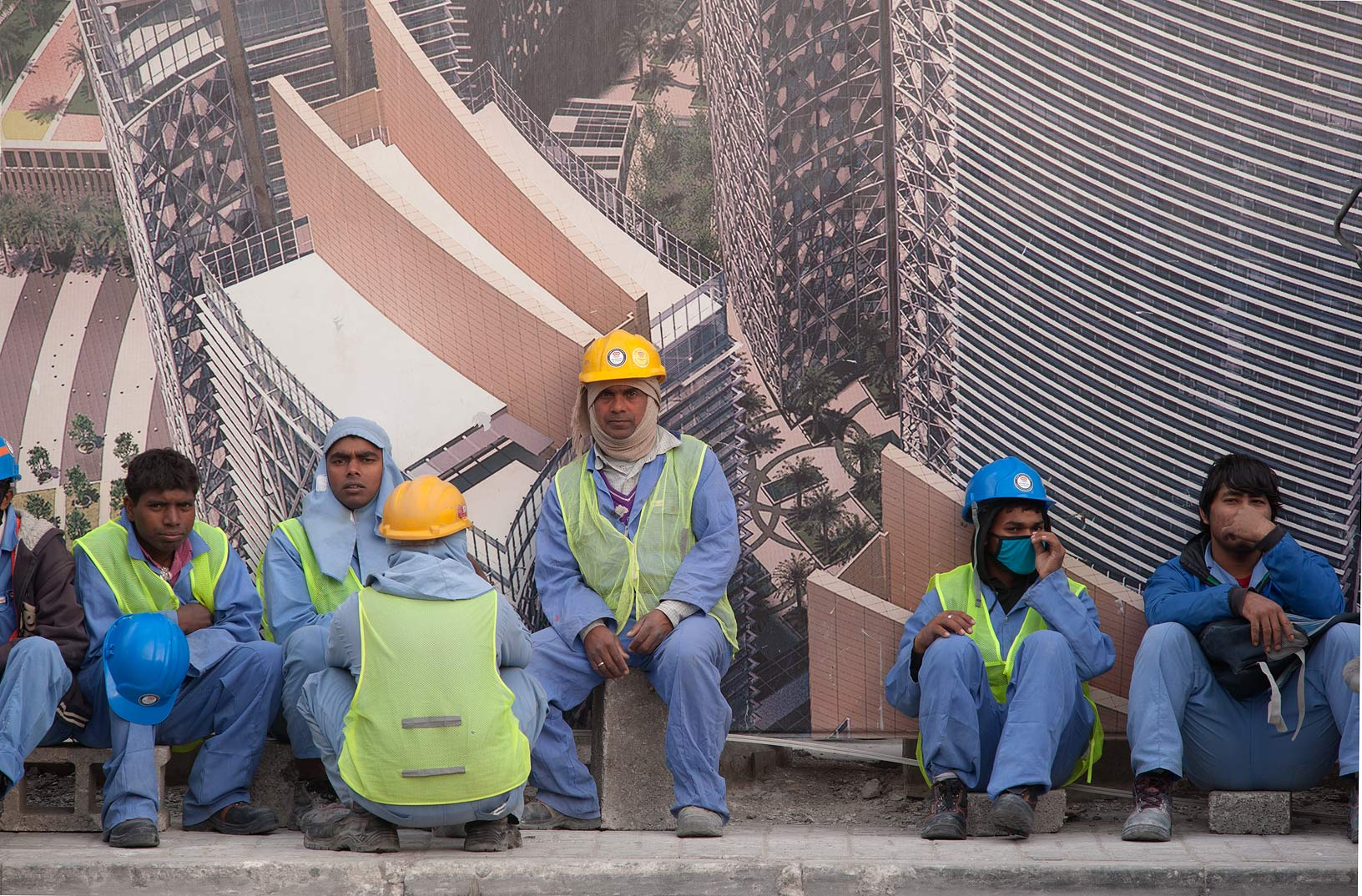
Migrant workers in Doha, Qatar

The treatment of South Asian labourers in the Gulf Cooperation Council (GCC) region is an ongoing issue between members of the South Asian Association for Regional Cooperation (SAARC) nations and the wealthy oil-rich Gulf Cooperation Council. The current large number of migrants from South Asia to the Persian Gulf began in the 1960s, when the oil boom in the Gulf Arab countries resulted in migrant labourers. This further increased with the development of large mega-cities. With the growth of megacities of Dubai, Doha and Riyadh, the need for construction labourers grew.

Migrants from Bhutan, Nepal, Pakistan, India, Sri Lanka, Bangladesh, and Maldives were contracted to develop the mushrooming skyscrapers. Many of these migrants were brought into the GCC under the kafala system, a sponsor-based system used in the GCC, which is seen by many human rights groups as highly exploitative, since their passports are confiscated and they are forced to work in low-level conditions, within cramped living quarters, for a low salary, and sometimes even without their due pay; when exploitation is brought up or exposed by media or the labourers, their employers are rarely punished.

== Prison population ==
Countries of the Gulf Cooperation Council (GCC) countries have the highest population of Pakistani prisoners.

2,224 Indians are in jails in Saudi Arabia and 1,606 in the United Arab Emirates.

In May 2020, 1000 Bangladeshi labourers who were in prisons and detention camps in the Middle East were allowed to go home. Two weeks after that, 29,000 Bangladeshi workers were sent back to their homeland.

== Trafficking of children ==
Thousands of boys are trafficked from Pakistan and Bangladesh to the Middle East where they are forced into working as camel jockeys. Because those who usually win races are small in size, the youngest children are kidnapped.

Those who lure Pakistani children present themselves as rich men who are offering them education. After they are kidnapped, they are made to wake up very early and then strapped onto camels. Because the camels run very fast, the boys often fall off and are trampled, causing them broken limbs and organ damage.

International aid organizations have asked countries in the Middle East to end the use of subcontinental children in their camel races.

== Terrorism accusations ==
Saudi Arabia expelled 40,000 Pakistani workers within four months at the end of 2016 and the early part of 2017, citing security concerns.

Abdullah Al-Sadoun, chairman of the security committee of the Shoura Council, asked for Pakistani citizens to be scrutinized before being allowed to come into Saudi Arabia.

Nafithat Tawasul of the Interior Ministry in Saudi Arabia announced that 82 Pakistanis were being held in prison as terror suspects.

== Treatment in the criminal justice system ==
Pakistani detainees and their families cited discrimination against them in the Saudi Arabian criminal justice system and Saudi Arabian courts. Saudi Arabia executes more Pakistanis than anyone of any other nationality.

Family members of Pakistani detainees said that the Saudi Arabian criminal justice system did not care about the circumstances that the accused brought drugs into the Middle East.

Pakistani detainees in Middle Eastern jails sited poor prison conditions like no proper sewage system and no bedsheets for sleeping.

Head of general security of Dubai, Dhahi Khalfan Tamim, who is the head of general security of Dubai and a Lieutenant General, "The Pakistanis pose a serious threat to the Gulf communities for the drugs they bring with them to our countries." He said that Bangladeshis have criminal tendencies.

== Beating of workers ==
Bangladeshi domestic workers like Shefali Begum have complained about being beaten with wires and canes just for asking for food.

Asian women report being choked and punched.

== Salary issues ==
When Pakistani workers flew to Qatar to work to build the World Cup stadium, many of them were not paid the salary owed to them. A labourer from Pakistan named Qadir Bakhshi had his contract terminated when he asked for his payment. 18 other people were met with the same fate.

In reports published by organizations like ILO and Human rights watch, it was revealed that Qatari government adopted a non-discriminatory minimum wage in March 2021 that applies to all workers, of all nationalities, in all sectors, including domestic work. A total of 13 percent of the workforce 280,000 people saw their wages rise to the new minimum threshold since the new legislation was introduced. Also, after analyzing these reforms Michael Page, deputy Middle East director at Human Rights Watch added that “Qatar’s new labour reforms are some of the most significant to date and could, if carried out effectively, considerably improve migrant workers’ living and work conditions”.

India's foreign ministry received more than 9,500 complaints between January and June 2019 concerning unpaid salaries, no off days and not being given visas to go back home.

== Working conditions ==
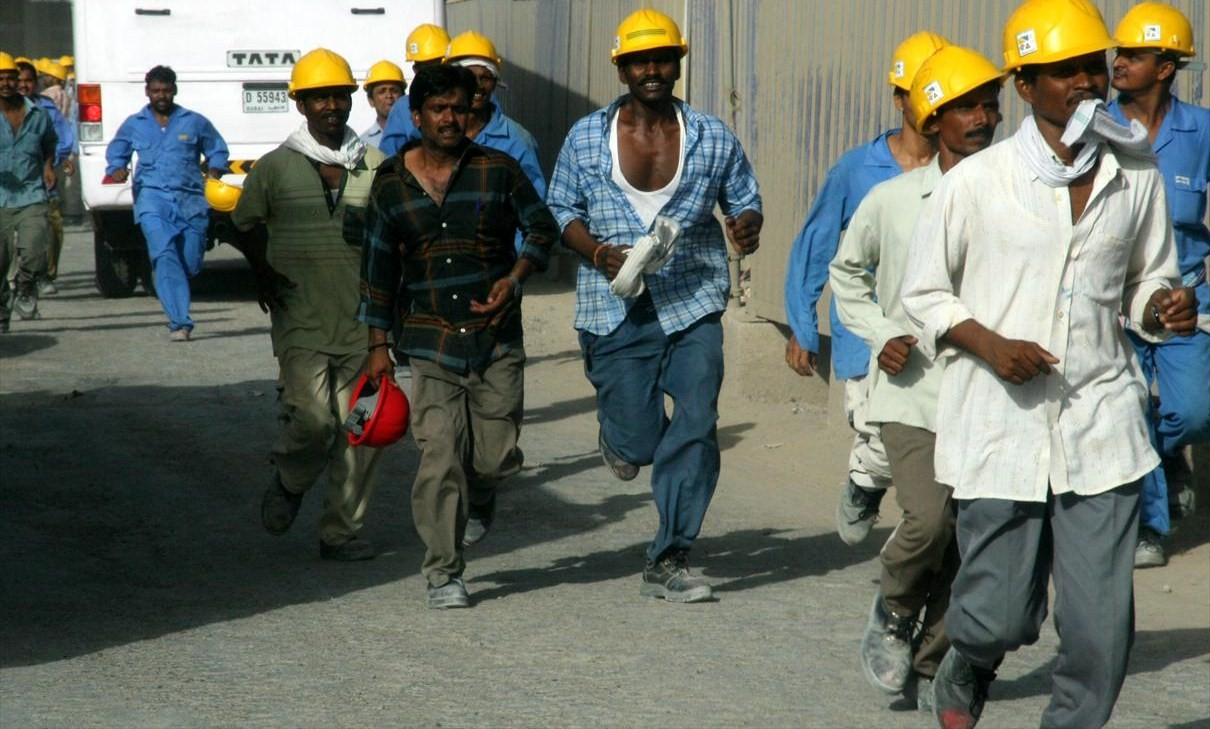
Migrant workers at the Burj Dubai

In Qatar, the Human Rights Watch needed to step in after hundreds of South Asian workers died while working in construction.

When the Coronavirus started infecting, South Asian labourers were living in unhygienic conditions with no means.

Acknowledging the poor working conditions, Qatar introduced significant labour and Kafala reforms for all workers in 2020. This ended the forced labour scheme in Qatar and improved the migrant workers’ living and work conditions, regardless of their nationality. In 2020, Qatar became the second country in the Gulf region to set a minimum wage for migrant workers, after Kuwait.

In 2021, Qatar introduced a new non-discriminatory minimum wage to further strengthen its labour market. To ensure compliance, the Government of Qatar enhanced the detection of violations, enacted swifter penalties and strengthened the capacity of labour inspectors.

== Living conditions ==
Rothna Begum, a specialist who studies Saudi Arabia, documented accounts of South Asian women sleeping on floors of storage rooms when they went to the Middle East.

== Sexual abuse of workers ==
Many female Bangladeshi workers in the Middle East become pregnant after being sexually abused by their employers. More than 100 Bangladeshi female labourers were living in shelters in Saudi Arabia and said that they suffered all kinds of abuse there, including sexual exploitation.

The Sharjah Sharia Court of First Instance sentenced an Egyptian man for raping an Indian housewife in the UAE. He was sentenced for ten years to jail.

Pakistani consultant Muhammad Saad was arrested by the police in the United Arab Emirates and taken to the Abu Dhabi city where he was forced to perform sexual acts and was then raped. His clothes were torn off. When he came back home to Pakistan, he was diagnosed with Post-traumatic stress disorder.

Begum has recorded cases where Middle Eastern men have barged into the rooms of migrant workers where they were staying and raped them.

Migrant women in Saudi Arabia are frequently charged with the crime of khilwa for mingling with people of the opposite sex.

== Visa issues ==
On November 18, 2020, the UAE banned visas for Pakistani nationals.

In 2012, the UAE stopped issuing visas for Bangladeshi nationals citing fake documents.

In April 2014, Kuwait renewed its visa ban on all Pakistanis.

In most instances passports of South Asian labourers are confiscated by their employers or sponsors.

== Harassment ==
Pakistanis travelling in the Middle East have faced harassment from Qatari passengers on the aeroplane. In July 2016 Pakistani traveller Kehkashan Khalid's husband was assaulted on an aeroplane by Qataris for reclining his seat so that his baby could sleep.

Employers have told female South Asians that they have bought them and so they can do whatever they would like to them.

A 31 year old Pakistani lady was commanded by her employer to make him breakfast on the weekends and when she said she didn't want to he threatened to fire her and deport her back to Pakistan, her salary was cut when she refused and her boss even called her family in Pakistan to report her to them. Another colleague kept on calling her in the middle of the night when she didn't accept his proposal.

== Racism ==
Pakistani driver Bashir Ahmed from Peshawar said that Saudi Arabians call him and his friends "Bengali, Hindi or Pakistani" as if these were abusive terms, not nationalities. In 2014, the Saudi Arabian government imposed additional formalities on its nationals from marrying Pakistani, Bangladeshi and Burmese women living in the kingdom. The Pakistani newspaper Dawn responded by accusing the kingdom of racism.

== Issues with kafala system ==
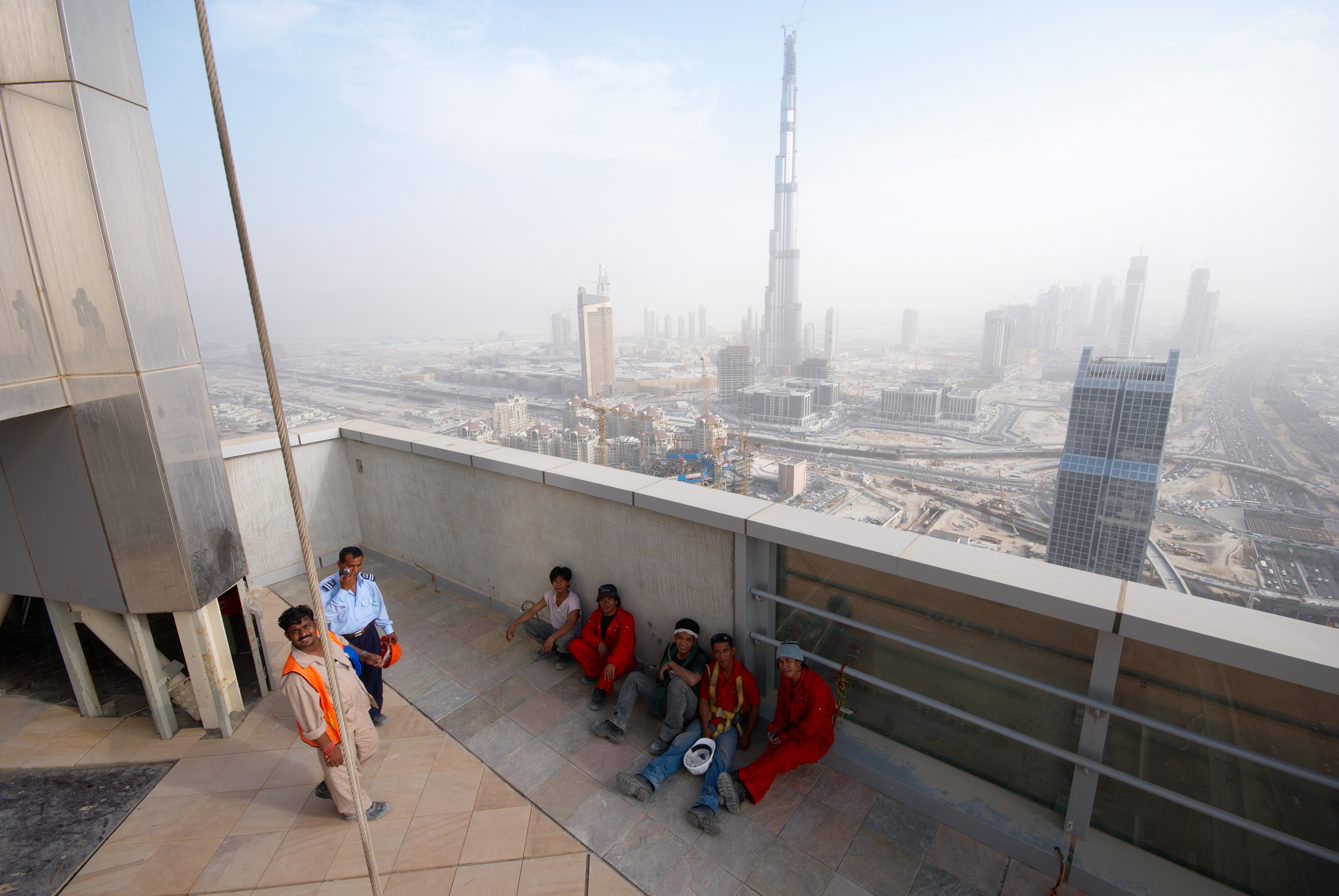
Migrant workers on top floor of the Angsana Tower

The kafala system is a major issue for South Asian labourers in the Persian Gulf region. The most common practice is the taking away of their passport. Further disenfranchisement is used through the lack of proper housing, occasional verbal abuse, and garnishment of wages. Female domestic workers also face physical and sexual abuse who are mainly from India and Bangladesh. It is said that the kafala system gives unchecked powers to Middle Eastern employers over subcontinental workers.

== See also ==
- Migrant workers in the Gulf Cooperation Council region
