= King Abdullah City for Female Students =

Women only education enclave

- مدينة الملك عبدالله للطالبات
- Type: Women's-only education enclave at Imam Mohammad Ibn Saud Islamic University
- Established: 2010
- Parent institution: Imam Mohammad Ibn Saud Islamic University
- Address: Uthman Ibn Affan Road, Imam Mohammad Ibn Saud Islamic University, Riyadh, Saudi Arabia
- Website: عمادة مدينة الملك عبدالله للطالبات
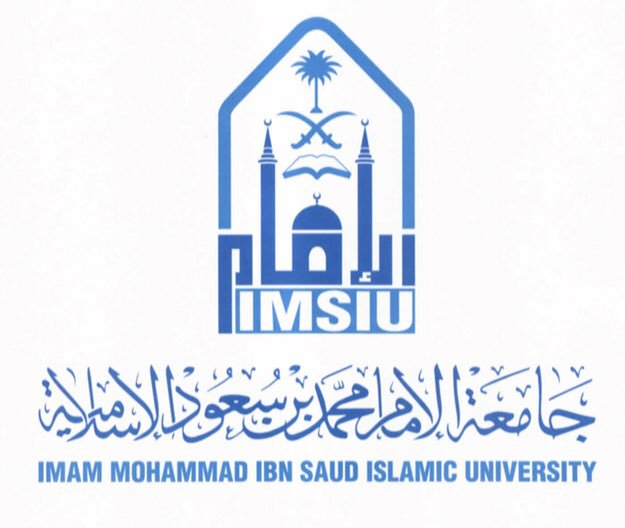

King Abdullah City for Female Students (Arabic: مدينة الملك عبدالله للطالبات, romanized: Madīnah al-Malik ʿAbd Allāh aṭ-Ṭālibāt), officially the King Abdullah City for Female Students at Al-Imam University, is a women's only education enclave in western part of the premises of Imam Mohammad Ibn Saud Islamic University in Riyadh, Saudi Arabia. Inaugurated in 2010, it costed two-billion Saudi riyals (533 million USD) and later on incorporated three female students study centers of al-Batha, al-Malaz and al-Nafal by 2012. Spanned across 100 hectares, it accommodates more than forty-thousand students from kindergarten to post-graduation and includes six buildings, part of which is a library and students' lobby.

== History ==
In January 2006, King Abdullah laid the foundation stone for the construction for a two-billion Saudi riyals women's exclusive education zone within the premises of Imam Mohammad Ibn Saud Islamic University. In November 2010, after its inauguration, it was named after the monarch by the director of the university as 'King Abdullah Ibn Abdulaziz City for Female Students'.

By 2011, the university began the process of merging the three former satellite campuses of al-Batha, al-Malaz and al-Nafal into the education enclave as they struggled to operate in their respective residential areas. The transfer of al-Malaz and al-Nafal branches were completed by early 2012, except al-Batha branch due to lack of safety tests in the new buildings and was thus, delayed for some time.

== Departments ==
- Department of Performance Monitoring
- Department of Technical Affairs
- Department of Female Student Affairs
