= Americans living in Saudi Arabia =

Americans in Saudi Arabia
Total population
- 80,000

Regions with significant populations
- Riyadh · Jeddah · Dhahran · Khobar · Neom

Languages
- English · Arabic and Spanish

Religion
- Protestantism · Islam · Roman Catholicism · Judaism

There is a sizable community of around 80,000 Americans living in Saudi Arabia, one of the largest populations of American nationals in the Arab world. Most work in the oil industry and in the construction and financial sectors. Westerners, including Americans, live in housing compounds with luxurious amenities, such as swimming pools and tennis courts, which are sealed off from surrounding neighborhoods by high walls and gates which give Americans "some security and privacy from the country's strict Islamic code on matters of dress and social mixing."

The largest American communities are in the capital of Riyadh, the headquarters of the most multinational corporations in the kingdom. Other American communities are located in the Red Sea port city of Jeddah, a major commercial center. There are smaller American communities in the eastern cities of Dammam, Khobar and Dhahran, serving the local oil fields. Saudi Arabia also has some 5,000 U.S. military personnel.

== See also ==
- Saudi Arabia–United States relations
- Emigration from the United States
- Saudi Americans
