= The Memorial School =

Defunct public school in Riyadh, Saudi Arabia

- المدرسة الابتدائية التذكارية
- Madrasa al-Tazkariyyah, 2020

Location
- Al Madinah Al Munawwarah Road, Al-Margab, Riyadh 12661, Saudi Arabia 24.63063°N 46.71785°E

Information
- Former name: Madrasah al-Ahliyyah (1948–1964)
- School type: Public
- Opened: 12 June 1948; 78 years ago
- Founder: King Abdulaziz
- Closed: 28 February 2019; 7 years ago
- Educational authority: Ministry of Education
- Gender: Gender-isolated
- Education system: Saudi Arabian
- Language: Arabic

The Memorial School, better known in Arabic as al-Madrasa al-Ibtidaiyah al-Tazkariyyah (Arabic: المدرسة الابتدائية التذكارية, romanized: al-Madrasah al-Āibtidāʾīīyyah al-Taḏkārīyyah, lit. 'Memorial Elementary School') and formerly as Madrasah al-Ahliyyah (Arabic: المدرسة الأهلية, romanized: Al-Madrasah Al-ʾĀhlīyyah), was a state-run boys-only public school in the Margab neighborhood of Riyadh, Saudi Arabia, active from 1948 to 2019. Established by King Abdulalziz ibn Saud following his 1945 trip to Egypt, it was Riyadh's first and oldest public school that was founded to provide formal education to the city's residents.

== History ==
Following King Abdulaziz's return to Jeddah from his state-visit to Egypt in 1945, a group of merchants from Riyadh reportedly collected some amounts of money to organize a reception party for the monarch. Upon being informed of this, Abdulaziz instead insisted the merchants to use the money for charitable purposes and asked them to establish a school in Riyadh that would offer formal education.

The school was inaugurated on June 12, 1948, as Madrasa al-Ahliyyah in the presence of Abdulaziz. Around 1954, Prince Fahd bin Abdulaziz, the country's then education minister paid a visit to the school and was displeased to the see its earth-structured building composed of wood and mud. He subsequently issued directives to renovate and remodel the building with reinforced concrete and iron.

In 1964, the school's name was changed to Madrasa al-Tazkariyyah by King Faisal, in memory of Abdulaziz's return to Saudi Arabia from his state-visit to Egypt in 1945.

In the 1970s, an American cultural delegation visited the school. Most of the students and teachers were caught in embarrassment and awkwardness as they couldn't speak English and thus, were finding it difficult to communicate with the delegation. However, some of the non-Saudi Arab expatriate teachers with an English education background helped served as interpreters to a customary extent.

In February 2019, the Ministry of Education ordered the closure of the school due to lack of students enrolling in the institution.
