= CBSE Gulf Sahodaya =

Body of CBSE-affiliated schools in the Gulf

- Council of CBSE Affiliated Schools in the Gulf
- مجلس مدارس سي بي إس إي في الخليج; खाड़ी क्षेत्र में सीबीएसई संबद्ध स्कूलों की परिषद
- Formation: 1988; 38 years ago
- Region served: Bahrain; Kuwait; Oman; Qatar; Saudi Arabia; United Arab Emirates
- Chairman: Sanjeev K Jolly
- Parent organization: Central Board of Secondary Education
- Website: cbsegulf.info

The Council of CBSE Affiliated Schools in the Gulf (Arabic: مجلس مدارس سي بي إس إي في الخليج), or CBSE Gulf Sahodaya (English: CBSE Gulf Sahodaya) is a body of 193 principals of Central Board of Secondary Education-affiliated schools in the member states of the Gulf Cooperation Council, namely Bahrain, Kuwait, Oman, Qatar, Saudi Arabia, and the United Arab Emirates.

Established in 1988, it intends to promote cooperation among member schools and conducts joint examinations for classes 10 and 12 annually besides organizing cultural, literary, educational, art, sport and other curricular activities and festivals. It also holds the annual Principals Conference to discuss and plan the progress and development of the member schools.

== Organizational structure ==
The council is divided into 6 chapters, each one representing a GCC member state.

- Bahrain Chapter of the Gulf Sahodaya
- Kuwait Chapter of the Gulf Sahodaya
- Oman Chapter of the Gulf Sahodaya
- Qatar Chapter of the Gulf Sahodaya
- Saudi Arabia Chapter of the Gulf Sahodaya
- United Arab Emirates Chapter of the Gulf Sahodaya

== National Sports and Literary Competitions ==
Under the guidance of CBSE (Central Board of Secondary Education) the CBSE Gulf Sahodaya hosts National level competitions in each of the 6 GCC member state countries, each one being considered as a cluster and a part of the CBSE National games and literary competitions.

These national level events called the 'Cluster Meet' is an annual event hosted in Bahrain, Kuwait, Oman, Qatar, Saudi Arabia and United Arab Emirates where students take part in athletic competitions such as Football, Basketball, Badminton, Table Tennis, Running race, High Jump, Javelin Throw, Shot put etc. and literary competitions such as Debate Competition, Quiz Competition and Science Exhibition.
