= List of schools in the United Arab Emirates =

This is a list of schools in the United Arab Emirates, categorized by emirate:

== Abu Dhabi ==
- Abu Dhabi Indian School
- Abu Dhabi Indian School Branch 1, Al Wathba
- Abu Dhabi International School
- Abu Dhabi Model School
- ADNOC Schools
- Al Ain English Speaking School
- Al Dhafra Private School, Al Ain
- Al Dhafra Private School, Abu Dhabi
- Al Dhafra Private Academy
- Al Saad Indian School, Al Ain
- Al Sanawbar School
- Al Ain English Speaking School
- Al Ain Juniors School
- Al Ittihad National Private School
- Al Bateen World Academy
- Al Nahyaneia Model School, Al Ain
- Al Nahda National Schools
- Al Yasmina School
- American Community School of Abu Dhabi
- American International School, Abu Dhabi
- Ashbal Al Quds Private School
- Belvedere International School, Al Ain
- Bright Riders School
- Bhavans Pearl Wisdom School, Al Ain
- The British School – Al Khubairat
- Canadian International School
- Diyafah International School
- Dunes International School, Abu Dhabi
- Emirates International School
- Emirates International School - Meadows
- Emirates National Schools
- Emirates Future International Academy
- First Lebanon School
- Garden City British School
- GEMS American Academy
- GEMS Founders School Masdar City
- German International School Abu Dhabi
- Global Indian International School, Abu Dhabi
- Indian School, Al-Ain
- Islamia English School
- Japanese School in Abu Dhabi
- Liwa International School Al Mushrif
- Liwa International School Al Qattara
- Liwa International School for Girls
- Liwa International School Falaj Hazza
- Lycée Français Théodore Monod
- Lycée Louis Massignon
- Madar International School
- The Military High School, Al-Ain
- Model Private School, Abu Dhabi
- Merryland International School
- Our Own English High School, Al Ain
- New Indian Model School, Al Ain
- Reach British School
- Raha International School
- St Joseph's School
- Universal Philippine School
- Shaikh Khalifa Bin Zayed Bangladesh Islamia School
- Sheikh Zayed Private Academy For Girls
- Sunrise English Private School
- Sheikh Zayed Private Academy For Boys
- Yasmina British Academy
- Zayed Al Awwal Secondary School, Al Ain

== Ajman ==
- Al Ameer English School
- Cosmopolitan International Indian School
- Habitat School Al Jurf
- Habitat School Al Tallah
- Global Indian School
- British International School, Ajman
- Delhi Private School
- International Indian School
- Metropolitan International Indian School
- The Royal Academy, Ajman
- Woodlem British School, Ajman
- Woodlem Park Al Hamidiya Private School
- Woodlem Park School, Ajman

== Dubai ==
- Al Ahmadiya School
- Al Ameen School
- Al Mawakeb Schools - Al Barsha, Al Garhoud, Al Khawaneej
- Al-Mizhar American Academy
- Al Salam Private School
- American School of Dubai
- Arab Unity School
- Arcadia British School
- Al Diyafah High School
- Buds Public School
- Clarion School
- Credence High School
- Delhi Private School, Dubai
- Dubai American Academy
- Dubai British School
- Dubai British School, Jumeirah Park
- Dubai College
- Dubai English Speaking College
- Dubai International Academy
- Dubai International School
- Dubai Japanese School
- Dubai National School, Al Barsha
- Dubai National School, Al Twar
- Dubai Scholars Private School
- Emirates International School – Jumeirah
- Emirates International School - Meadows
- English College Dubai
- English Language Private School
- GEMS Modern Academy
- GEMS Our Own Indian School
- GEMS School of Research and Innovation
- GEMS Wellington International School
- GEMS Winchester School
- GEMS World Academy
- German International School Dubai
- Global Indian International School
- Grammar School, Dubai
- Greenfield International School
- Greenwood International School
- Gulf Indian High School
- The Indian High School, Dubai
- Jumeira Baccalaureate School
- Jumeirah College
- Latifa School for Girls
- Lycée Français International de Dubaï
- Lycée Français International Georges Pompidou
- New Indian Model School
- Nord Anglia International School Dubai
- Our Own English High School
- The Philippine School, Dubai
- Rashid School For Boys
- Repton School Dubai
- Russian International School in Dubai
- St. Mary's Catholic High School
- Sunmarke School
- Swiss International Scientific School in Dubai
- The Winchester School

== Fujairah ==
- Diyar International Private School
- Eminence Private School
- Fujairah Private Academy
- Indian School Fujairah
- Pakistan Islamia Higher Secondary School
- St. Mary's Catholic High School, Fujairah

== Ras al-Khaimah ==
- Alpha Private School
- Emirates National School
- GEMS Westminster School RAK
- Indian Public High School
- Indian School, Ras al-Khaimah
- Ras Al Khaimah Academy
- Scholars Indian School
- The Wellspring School

== Sharjah ==
- Al Amaal English High School
- Al Ma'arifa International Private School
- Al Wahda Private School
- American Academy in Al-Mizhar
- American Community School Sharjah
- American School of Creative Science Al Layyah, Sharjah
- ASPAM Indian International School
- Australian International School, Sharjah
- Bhavans Pearl Wisdom School
- Brilliant International Private School
- Delhi Private School, Sharjah
- Emirates American School
- The Emirates National School
- GEMS Millenium School Sharjah
- German International School Sharjah
- Ibn Seena English High School
- India International School
- International School of Choueifat
- International School of Creative Science Muwaileh, Sharjah
- Leaders Private School Sharjah
- New Indian Model School, Sharjah
- New World American Private School
- Our Own English High School, Sharjah
- PACE British School, Sharjah
- PACE International School
- Progressive English School Sharjah
- Scholars International Academy
- School of Knowledge
- Sharjah American International School
- Sharjah British International School Sharjah
- Sharjah English School
- Sharjah Indian School
- Wesgreen International School

== Umm al-Quwain ==
- Al Ameer Secondary School
- Choueifat School Umm Al Quwain
- East English School
- Elite American Private School, UAQ
- New Indian School, Umm Al Quwain
- Sharjah American School, UAQ
- The English School, Umm al-Quwain
- Umm Al Qura Private School
- Wise Indian Private School

== See also ==
- List of universities and colleges in the United Arab Emirates
- Education in the United Arab Emirates
