= International Indian School, Ajman =

- المدرسة الهندیة العالمیة الخاصة عجمان
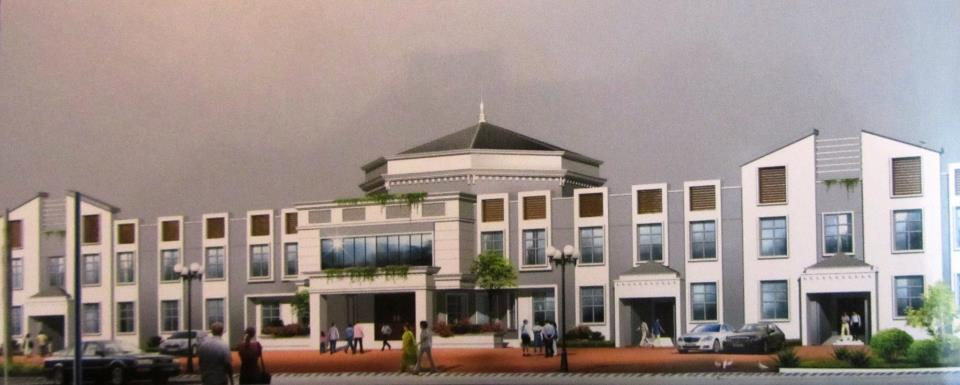
- International Indian School Ajman

Location
- Al Zahra, Ajman; Ajman, Ajman; United Arab Emirates; 25°24′2.67″N 55°29′46.37″E

Information
- Type: Private co-educational K–12 school
- Motto: Honouring our legacy, Defining the Future
- Established: 2002
- Principal: Qurrat Ul Ain
- Grades: KG to Grade 12
- Enrollment: 5,000+
- Education system: Indian
- Language: English
- Campus: Urban
- Houses: Red, Blue, Green, Yellow
- Colors: Navy blue and white
- Mascot: Eagle
- Affiliation: CBSE, New Delhi
- Information: +971 6 7408300
- Website: iisajman.org

The International Indian School, Ajman (IIS Ajman) is a private co-educational English-medium school located in Ajman, United Arab Emirates. Founded in 2002, the school follows the curriculum prescribed by the Central Board of Secondary Education (CBSE), New Delhi, India, and is licensed by the Ministry of Education, UAE. With over 5,000 students, it is one of the largest Indian curriculum schools in the emirate of Ajman, serving primarily the expatriate Indian community.

== History ==
The International Indian School, Ajman was established in 2002 to meet the growing educational needs of the Indian expatriate community in Ajman. The school was founded under the patronage of Sheikh Humaid bin Rashid Al Nuaimi, the Ruler of Ajman, and began operations with a modest enrollment that has since grown to over 5,000 students.

== Campus and infrastructure ==
The school is situated on a purpose-built campus in the Al Zahra district of Ajman. The facilities include:

- Modern classrooms with smart boards and digital tools
- Laboratories for Physics, Chemistry, Biology, and Computer Science
- Well-stocked library
- Multipurpose indoor hall
- Sports fields and courts
- Play areas for kindergarten
- Medical clinic
- Cafeteria
- Prayer rooms

Separate sections are maintained for boys and girls from Grade 6 onwards, in line with UAE norms.

== Overview ==
International Indian School serves students from Kindergarten through Grade 12 and is structured into five divisions:

- Kindergarten (KG1–KG2)
- Primary I (Grades 1–3)
- Primary II (Grades 4–5)
- Boys' Section (Grades 6–12)
- Girls' Section (Grades 6–12)

== Administration ==
The school is led by Principal Qurrat Ul Ain and supported by a structured team:

- Board of Governors
- Principal and Vice Principals
- Section Supervisors
- Department Heads
- Teachers and Support Staff

== Academics ==
=== Curriculum ===
The school follows the CBSE framework:

- Primary (Grades 1–5): Language, Math, EVS, Arts, PE
- Middle (Grades 6–8): Science, Math, Social Science, IT, Languages
- Secondary (Grades 9–10): AISSE exam preparation
- Senior Secondary (Grades 11–12): Science, Commerce, Humanities

=== Academic performance ===
- 2018: 100% pass in Grade 10 CBSE
- 2019: 98.5% pass in Grade 12 CBSE
- 2020–2022: 95%+ pass rates despite pandemic

=== Teaching methodology ===
- Interactive and digital learning
- Project-based and experiential education
- Regular assessments
- Teacher training and development

== Facilities and student life ==
The school uses a house system (Red, Blue, Green, Yellow) to foster teamwork and competition.

=== Co-curricular activities ===
- Arts, sports, clubs, robotics
- Annual cultural events and exhibitions

=== Annual events ===
- Sports Day, Literary Festivals, Cultural Programs
- National Day and Environmental Celebrations

=== Student support services ===
- Counseling and special education
- Health services
- School transportation

== Community engagement ==
- Community service, parent involvement, alumni network
- Environmental campaigns and inter-school cultural participation

== Accreditation and recognition ==
- CBSE affiliation
- Licensed by UAE Ministry of Education
- Ajman Education Zone and CBSE Gulf Council member

== Affiliations and network ==
The school is part of a broader CBSE network in the Gulf region. Related schools include:

- International Indian School, Riyadh
- International Indian School Jeddah
- International Indian School, Dammam
- International Indian Public School, Sharjah

== Future developments ==
Planned initiatives include:

- Campus expansion
- Enhanced tech infrastructure
- Advanced STEM programs
- Teacher training upgrades
- International collaborations

== See also ==
- Education in the United Arab Emirates
- Central Board of Secondary Education
- List of schools in the United Arab Emirates
