= Oud Metha =

Oud Metha عود ميثاء
- Community
- Interactive map of Oud Metha
- Coordinates: 25.23740°N 55.31170°E
- Country: United Arab Emirates
- Emirate: Dubai
- City: Dubai

Area
  - Total: 1.5 km^{2} (0.58 sq mi)

Population (2000)
  - Total: 2,469
  - Density: 1,600/km^{2} (4,300/sq mi)
- Community number: 319

Oud Metha (Arabic: عود ميثاء), or Al Nasr (Arabic: النصر) is a locality in Dubai, United Arab Emirates (UAE). Although a small residential locality, has several commercial and entertainment complexes, schools and cultural clubs.

Al Nasr is bordered by the localities of Al Karama, Umm Hurair 2 and Zabeel. It is the home of Al-Nasr Sports Club, a football club of the UAE League based in Dubai.

In addition, several expatriate schools such as Dubai Gem Private School, GEMS Winchester School, The Indian High School, Dubai, Al Rashed Al Saleh Private School and St. Mary's Catholic High School as well as cultural clubs such as the India Club, the Iranian Club, the Sudanese Social Club and the Pakistani Association of Dubai are located in this area. The French international school Lycée Français International Georges Pompidou maintains a maternelle (preschool) campus in Oud Metha.

The Dubai Metro's Green Line also has a station at Oud Metha.
