= Noor Aldeen Atatreh =

Emirati academic (born 1976)

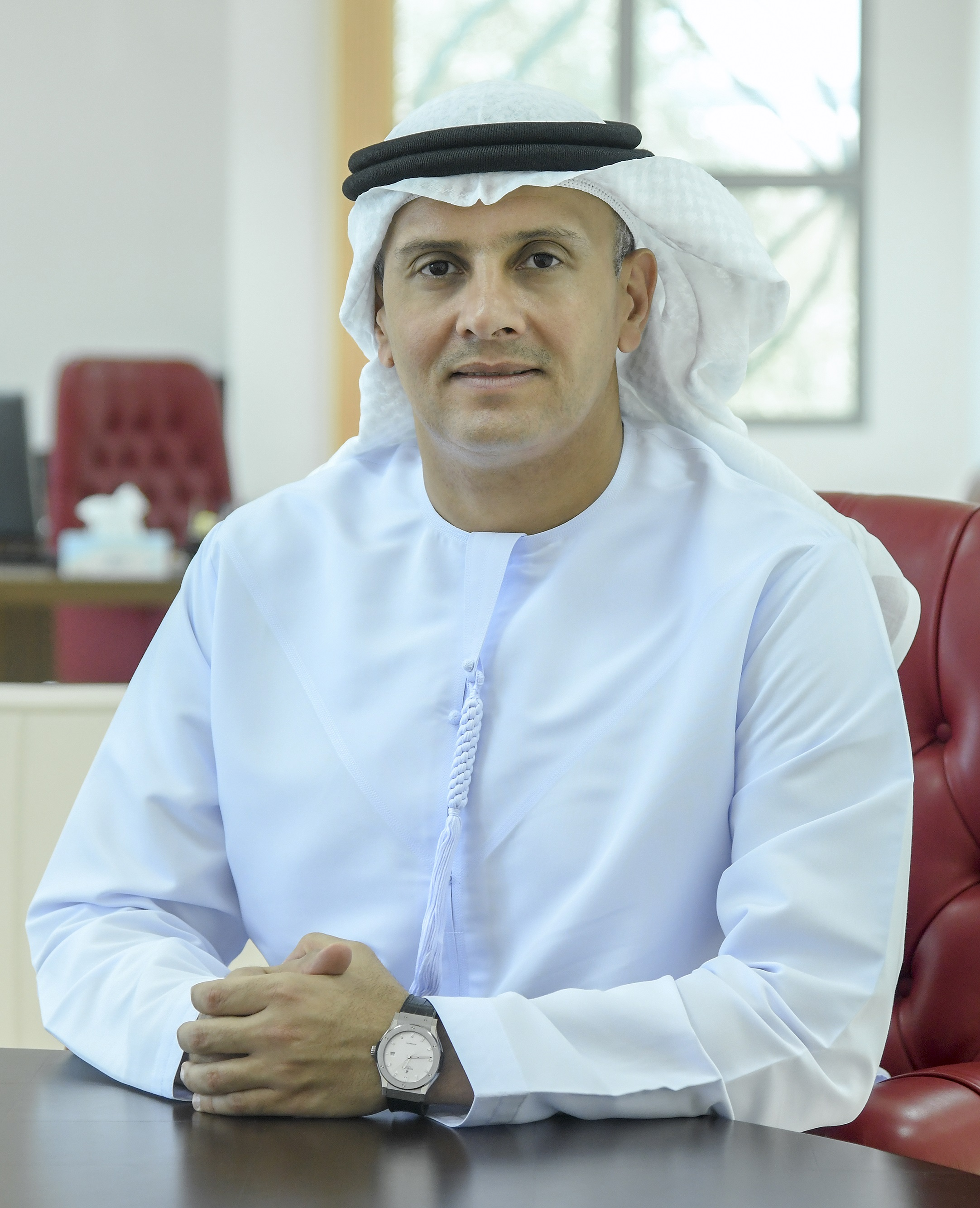
- Other name: Noor Aldeen S. A. Atatreh
- Education: Manchester University, Newcastle University
- Occupations: Researcher, educational leader
- Known for: Chancellor of Al Ain University of Science and Technology

Noor Aldeen Atatreh is an Emirati researcher and educational leader working in the aspects of scientific knowledge, innovations and academic communities.

== Early life and education ==
Noor Aldeen Atatreh was born in Al-Ain, United Arab Emirates, in 1976. He is the eldest sibling of his family consisting of 4 sons; Abdullah, Anas, Mohamad and 2 daughters. He went to Malek Bin Anas School in Al-Ain. He then completed his secondary school from Zayed Al Awal School in 1994.

He pursued undergraduate studies in Applied Science University in Jordan and got BSc in Pharmacy in 1999.

Atatreh received his PhD degree in Pharmacy from Manchester University, UK and his MSc in Drug Chemistry from Newcastle University.

== Career ==
Atatreh has served as a Vice Chairman of Al Ain University since April 2011 where he has looked after external affairs as well as brought upon various development processes for the university. He also serves as the Board Member and Chancellor of Al Falah University since 2014.

As a researcher, Noor Atatreh has several publications in peer-reviewed journals with a focus on cancer research and drug development & design.

From 2008 to 2011, he was a Board Member at the Bonyan International Investment Group Holding.

In 2013, he became the board member of Tabarak Investment LLC. The next year, he also joined the board of Dar Al Maarefah LLC and continues to hold both these positions.

In 2017, Atatreh became the Board Member of Takaful Emarat – Insurance (PJSC) where he still serves.

Atatreh is also a member of American Association for Cancer Research in the USA, British Association of Cancer Research and the Royal Society of Chemistry in the UK.

In 2023, Atatreh became a Chairman of Takaful Emarat – Insurance (PJSC) where he still serves.

In 2023, Atatreh became Founder & Chairman of the Board of Directors of Scifiniti Publishing

== Selected publications ==
- Atatreh N.; Ghattas M. A.; Bardaweel S.; Al Rawashdeh S; Al Sorkhy M., Identification of new inhibitors of Mdm2–p53 interaction via pharmacophore and structurebased virtual screening. Drug Design, Development and Therapy 2018, 12: 3741-3752.
- Ghattas, M. A.; Bryce, R. A.; Al Rawashdah, S.; Atatreh, N.; Zalloum, W. A., Comparative Molecular Dynamics Simulation of Aggregating and Non-Aggregating Inhibitor Solutions: Understanding the Molecular Basis of Promiscuity. ChemMedChem 2018, 13(6), 500-506.
- Ghattas, M. A.; Eissa, N. A.; Bardaweel, S. K.; Mellal, A. A.; Atatreh, N., Computeraided discovery of antimicrobial agents as potential enoyl acyl carrier protein reductase inhibitors. Tropical Journal of Pharmaceutical Research 2017, 16 (2), 97-405.
- AlNeyadi, S. S.; Salem, A. A.; Ghattas, M. A.; Atatreh, N.; Abdou, I. M., Antibacterial activity and mechanism of action of the benzazole acrylonitrile-based compounds: In vitro, spectroscopic, and docking studies. European Journal of Medicinal Chemistry 2017, 136, 270-282.
- Ghattas, M. A.; Raslan, N.; Sadeq, A.; Sorkhy, M. A.; Atatreh, N., Druggability analysis and classification of protein tyrosine phosphatase active sites. Drug Design, Development and Therapy 2016, 10, 3197-3209.
- Ghattas, M. A.; Mansour, R. A.; Atatreh, N.; Bryce, R. A., Analysis of Enoyl-Acyl Carrier Protein Reductase Structure and Interactions Yields an Efficient Virtual Screening Approach and Suggests a Potential Allosteric Site. Chemical Biology and Drug Design 2016, 87 (1), 131-142.
- Ghattas, M. A.; Al Sorkhy, M.; Atatreh, N., In silico design of new MPS1 inhibitors via a validated structure based virtual screening approach. Der Pharma Chemica 2016, 8 (2), 365-374.
- Sadek, B.; Khanian, S. S.; Ashoor, A.; Prytkova, T.; Ghattas, M. A.; Atatreh, N.; Nurulain, S. M.; Yang, K. H. S.; Howarth, F. C.; Oz, M., Effects of antihistamines on the function of human α7-nicotinic acetylcholine receptors. European Journal of Pharmacology 2015, 746, 308-316.
- Ghattas, M. A.; Atatreh, N.; Bichenkova, E. V.; Bryce, R. A., Protein tyrosine phosphatases: Ligand interaction analysis and optimisation of virtual screening. Journal of Molecular Graphics and Modelling 2014, 52, 114-123. Atatreh, N.; Stojkoski, C.; Smith, P.; Booker,
- G. W.; Dive, C.; Frenkel, A. D.; Freeman, S.; Bryce, R. A., In silico screening and biological evaluation of inhibitors of Src- SH3 domain interaction with a prolinerich ligand. Bioorganic and Medicinal Chemistry Letters 2008, 18 (3), 1217-1222.
- Atatreh, N.; Barraclough, J.; Welman, A.; Cawthorne, C.; Bryce, R. A.; Dive, C.; Freeman, S., Difluoro analogue of UCS15A triggers activation of exogenously expressed c-Src in HCT 116 human colorectal carcinoma cells. Journal of Enzyme Inhibition and Medicinal Chemistry 2007, 22 (5), 638-646.
