= International Indian School, Jubail =

Indian Embassy school in Al Jubail, Eastern Province, Saudi Arabia

International Indian School Jubail
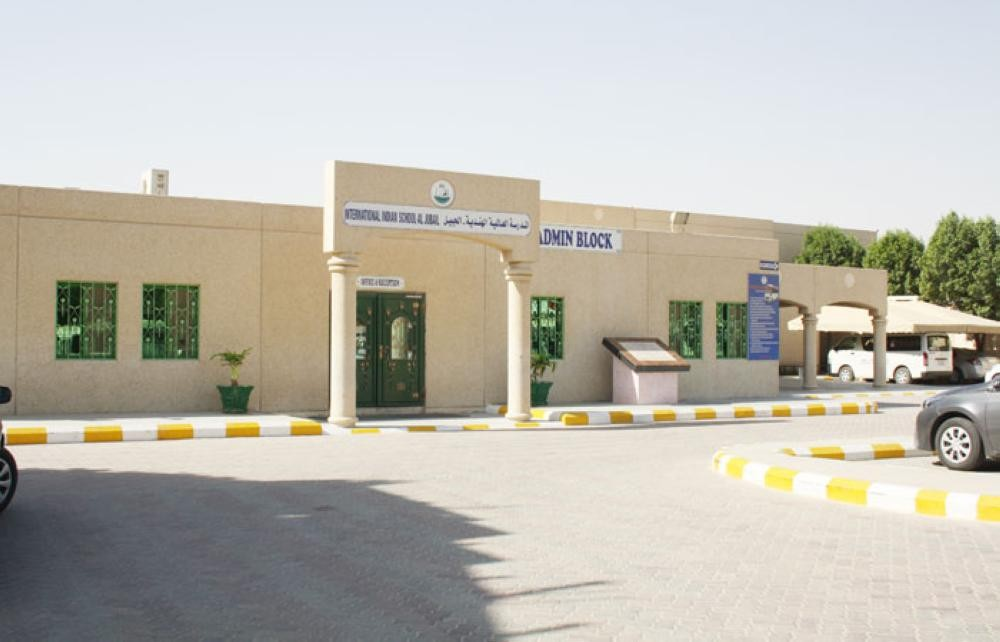

Location
- Al Jubail, Eastern Province, 35514; Saudi Arabia
- 27.021814604233583°N 49.640191575677875°E

Information
- Other name: International Indian School, Al-Jubail
- Former name: Indian Embassy School, Jubail
- Type: Private school
- Patron saint: Suhel Ajaz Khan
- Established: 30 November 1987; 38 years ago
- Sister school: IIS Riyadh; IIS Dammam
- School board: CBSE
- Session: 1 April to 31 March
- School code: 90002
- Principal: Dr. Nisha Madhu
- Grades: K-12
- Age: 3.5 to 17
- Classes: LKG to Class XII
- Average class size: 33
- Language: English
- Campuses: 4
- Campus size: 48650 sq meter
- Communities served: Indian Community School
- Website: www.iisjubail.org

International Indian School Jubail or IISJ (formerly Indian Embassy School Jubail) is an English-medium K-12 Indian school in Al Jubail of Saudi Arabia. It was founded on 30 November 1987. The school is part of global International Indian Schools including International Indian School, Riyadh, International Indian School Jeddah.

== See also ==
- Indians in Saudi Arabia
- International Indian School, Dammam
- International Indian School, Riyadh
- International Indian School Jeddah
