= IISD =

IISD is an acronym that may refer to:

- International Institute for Sustainable Development
- International Indian School Dammam
