= Yasmina British Academy =

- مدرسة الياسمينة الخاصة

Location
- Khalifa City A, 12th St and 3rd PO Box 128166; Abu Dhabi; United Arab Emirates; 24°24′50.6″N 54°32′50.3″E

Information
- School type: Private school
- Opened: September 2008
- Founder: Aldar Academies
- Sister school: Al Bateen Secondary School
- Authority: Aldar Academies
- Oversight: Abu Dhabi Department Of Education And Knowledge (ADEK)
- Principal: Mr Keith Miller
- Years offered: FS1-Year 13
- Gender: Co-educational
- Age: 3 to 18
- International students: 70+ nationalities
- Schedule: Monday - Friday, Monday - Thursday: 7:40am - 2:55pm, Friday: 7:40 - 11:55pm GMT +4
- Hours in school day: 8 hours
- Campus size: 180,000 m^{2}
- Houses: Solaris Scorpions (red); Aqua Dolphins (blue); Terra Oryx (green); Ventus Falcons (yellow); Luna Wolves (purple); Ember Eagles (orange)
- Colours: FS1 to Year 6: Green and Beige; Year 7 to Year 11: White and Slate; Post 16 (12 & 13): Skyblue and Slate
- Sports: Rugby, football, netball and athletics
- Accreditation: Edexcel, British Schools in the Middle East (BSME)
- School fees: FS1 - Year 1: 49,740 AED Yearly, Year 2 - Year 6: 51,180 AED Yearly, Year 7 & 8: 56,910 AED Yearly, Year 9: 61,010 AED Yearly, Year 10 - Year 13: 67,210 AED Yearly
- Website: https://www.yasminabritishacademy.ae/

Yasmina British Academy is a private, British curriculum school in Abu Dhabi, United Arab Emirates. Al-Yasmina educates students from foundation stage 1 till year 13 in joint primary and secondary schools. It’s area (180,000 m²) makes it the largest individual K-12 school campus in the middle east.

== History ==
Yasmina British Academy was opened in September 2008 by Darren Gale, ex-principal and is being run by Aldar Academies.

== Curriculum ==
Yasmina British follows the British curriculum. The school offers iGCSEs, GCSEs and A-Levels. Science, English and Mathematics are compulsory subjects throughout the school.

== Sports, activities and ECAs ==
Yasmina British Academy is associated to the UAE touch rugby programme. The school has already played a vital role in the increased presence of touch rugby in the Emirates having anchored the under-9 and under-11 Abu Dhabi Schools Super Touch rugby Series.

ECA stands for Extra Curriculum Activity, it lets students select a subject/activity and stay after school to do their activities. And there are invite only activities that are sports (football or soccer for those Americans), touch rugby and rugby (rugby only secondary, year 7 to 13) and netball primary and secondary only. Some activities are band practice and rehearsal for the theater and shows happening on later months.

== Art and theater ==
Yasmina British Academy also hosts Art and Theater courses, such as in Art, Drama, and Design & Technology, all of which are offered at both GCSE and A-Level qualifications. The current Head of Drama is teacher Nick Washbrook, who is also the Assistant Principal of Pastoral Welfare and Standards.

Yasmina British regularly holds showings of Theater/Drama performances done by students, and sometimes teachers. Recent performances include Annie (play), Grease (play), The Curious Incident of the Dog in the Night-Time (play), and the Joker (play), in which Nick Washbrook himself played the Joker and heckled and laughed at the audience. The 2023 performance was School of Rock.

== Rebranding ==
The Al Yasmina brand slowly transitioned to 'Yasmina British Academy' (from 2022) as they move K-12 students to the new campus. The rebranding consists of changing their logo to multiple shades of green, accompanying the new name.

== Awards ==
The school won 'Best School' in the 2012 Ahlan! 'Best in Abu Dhabi' awards.

It also links to A

== See also ==
- Al Salam Private School & Nursery
