= Adil Ibrahim =

Indian actor, radio jockey, TV host, and model

- Adil Ibrahim at the SIIMA Awards 2022
- Born: Dubai, United Arab Emirates
- Citizenship: India
- Education: New Indian Model School
- Alma mater: Birla Institute of Technology and Science, Pilani
- Occupations: Actor; television host; anchor; radio jockey
- Years active: 2013 – present
- Spouse: Namitha Adil (m. 2019)
- Website: Official website

Adil Ibrahim (born 6 February) is an Indian actor, radio jockey, television host and model. He made his acting debut in Sanjeev Sivan's Endless Summer in 2013. Besides acting, he is well known for hosting the shows D 4 Dance and Still Standing on Mazhavil Manorama.

== Early life ==
Adil Ibrahim was born in Dubai, United Arab Emirates to parents originally from Malappuram, Kerala, India. He attended the New Indian Model School in Dubai and graduated with a Bachelor of Engineering from the Birla Institute of Technology and Science, Pilani.

== Career ==
In 2009, he began anchoring for the channel Asianet with You, Me and Dubai, a program based on the Dubai Shopping festival and Magic Carpet, an Arabian Travelogue on the same channel. He has also anchored for Amrita TV and Media One.

He worked as a radio jockey for RadioMe, presenting the breakfast show, Morning Madness on the RadioMe programs Ramadan Nights and Cocktail. He hosted the third season of the dance show D4 Dance on Mazhavil Manorama and also hosted Still Standing for the same channel.

== Filmography ==
=== Film ===
Key
†	Denotes films that have not yet been released

Year	Title	Role	Notes	Ref
2014	Endless Summer	Unni		
2014	Persiakaran	RJ Aravind		
2015	Nirnnayakam	Sudev	Nominated SIIMA Award for Best Debutant Male (Malayalam)	
2015	Rockstar	Michael		
2016	Sukhamayirikkatte			
2016	Kappiri Thuruthu	Samovar		
2017	Achayans	Abey		
2017	Hello Dubaikkaran	Prakashan		
2018	Oru Kuttanadan Blog	Rahul		
2019	Nine	Dr.Rahul		
2019	Lucifer	Riju		
2021	Mohan Kumar Fans	Arun Rajeev		
2021	Cheraathukal	Abin	Segment: Samoohya Paadangal	
2022	Last 6 Hours	Rahul		
2022	Aanaparambile World Cup	Sufi Singer	Cameo appearance	
2022	Varaal	Antony John Medayil		
2023	Ennennekum	Rafi Malik		
2023	Maharani			
2024	Paalum Pazhavum	Sukuvettan		
TBA	Shalamon †			
TBA	Spring †			

=== Short films ===
Year	Title	Role	Notes
2014	Dirty Diana		
2016	Hridayam	Stephen	
2017	Hand Of God	Adil	
2019	Padinnjare Maanathulla	The Lover	Music album

=== Television ===
Year	Title	Role	Channel	Ref
2009	You, Me and Dubai	Host	Asianet Middle East	
2009	Magic Carpet	Host	Asianet Middle East	
2016	D4 Dance Season-3	Host	Mazhavil Manorama	
2016	D 4 Dance Reloaded	Host	Mazhavil Manorama	
2017	Onnum Onnum Moonu	Guest	Mazhavil Manorama	
2017	Comedy Super Nite	Guest	Flowers TV	
2017-2018	Still Standing	Host	Mazhavil Manorama	
2024	1000 Babies	SI Anzari	Disney+ Hotstar	
