= Middlesex University Dubai =

Branch campus of Middlesex University London in Dubai, United Arab Emirates

Coordinates: 25.10339°N 55.16438°E

- جامعة ميدلسكس دبي
- Middlesex University Dubai, April 2022
- Type: Branch campus of Middlesex University London
- Established: 2005; 21 years ago
- Parent institution: Middlesex University London
- Accreditation: Ministry of Higher Education and Scientific Research (MoHESR), Knowledge and Human Development Authority
- Location: Dubai Knowledge Park, Dubai, United Arab Emirates
- Website: www.mdx.ac.ae

Middlesex University (MDX) Dubai (Arabic: جامعة ميدلسكس دبي, romanized: Jāmiʿah Mīdilsaks Dubaī) is an offshore campus of Middlesex University London in Dubai, United Arab Emirates. Situated across two locations in Dubai Knowledge Park and Dubai International Academic City, the campus was inaugurated in 2005 and currently has over 7,100 students from over 120 nationalities studying across both locations. Professor Cedwyn Fernandes is the Provost and Director of Middlesex University Dubai.

Middlesex University's student body has over 37,000 students from more than 140 nationalities.

== History ==
Middlesex University opened its first overseas branch campus – Middlesex University Dubai in 2005. It is a private university located in Dubai, United Arab Emirates. It is the first overseas campus of Middlesex University London (UK).

The university campus is located in Dubai Knowledge Park as part of Dubai's Technology and Media Free Zone. This is a joint venture with Middlesex Associates, a business consortium in Dubai. The campus was the first Middlesex campus outside North London. In 2018, Amanat Holdings acquired the Dubai campus operator, Middlesex Associates. In July 2020, Amanat agreed to sell the campus to Study World Education Holding Group, but the agreement was terminated in October 2020.

The university offers a wide range of foundation, undergraduate, postgraduate and MBA programmes across both its Dubai campuses, including: Accounting and Finance, Business and Management, Marketing, Computer Engineering and Informatics, Data Science, Robotics, Education, Psychology, Law, Digital Media, Film, Sport Science, Fashion Design, and Graphic Design.

The campus is licensed by Dubai Knowledge and Human Authority (KHDA), and its programmes are approved by the KHDA. In August 2009, KHDA's University Quality Assurance International Board (UQAIB) commended the quality of university's programmes. The Commission for Academic Accreditation (CAA) of the UAE’s Ministry of Higher Education and Scientific Research (MoHESR) granted Middlesex University Dubai its institutional license in January 2025. The MoHESR license underscores the commitment of Middlesex University Dubai to maintaining the highest standards of academic excellence.

MDX Dubai was recognised by KHDA as Dubai’s largest UK university for a fourth consecutive year as of 2024, with over 6,458 students from over 127 nationalities. Middlesex University Dubai received a 5-Star KHDA rating for the quality of its education and overall student experience in 2020, followed by a second in 2022.

In 2017, the university hosted the EU and UAE conference regarding the Rule of Law and Arbitration, where the Head of Delegation of the European Union to the United Arab Emirates, along with the legal director of Clyde & Co and the head of advocacy of Taylor Wessing were present.

In August 2019, the university was chosen to be a partner of the PRCA in the Middle East and North Africa region.

Following covid-19 related school-examination disruptions in 2021, the university allowed conditional offers or enrolment based on predicted grades for applicants whose examinations had been postponed or cancelled. It also introduced tuition discounts for UAE school leavers, including larger reductions for applicants meeting specified academic thresholds. It was stated that the goal of cutting university fees was to help families handle with financial strain caused by the pandemic.

In November 2021, Middlesex University has achieved a historic milestone by becoming the first international university in Dubai to provide a multi-site experience across the city's global higher education hubs. The design and build for this groundbreaking project were awarded to Horton Interiors.

In October 2023, Middlesex University Dubai launched the 'MDXplorer', a mobile, interactive hub designed to engage school students and inspire them about their future career choices through activities, games and quizzes. The MDXplorer comes in the form of a red London bus, paying homage to its home campus.

In December 2023, Middlesex University Dubai partnered with the Climate Law and Governance Initiative, Cambridge University, and University of Dubai to host the 2023 Climate Law and Governance Day (CLGD 2023) in conjunction with the United Nations Framework Convention on Climate Change (UNFCCC) Conference of the Parties (COP28) held in Dubai from November 30 to December 12.

In March 2024, Middlesex University Dubai launched the Middlesex Innovation Hub (MIH). The MIH is designed to provide students with access to the resources and guidance needed to develop business ideas, launch entrepreneurial initiatives and test innovative ideas. The inauguration was attended by His Excellency Khalfan Belhoul, Chief Executive Officer of the Dubai Future Foundation (DFF).

== Timeline ==
The history of Middlesex University began during the 1880s, when two colleges, St Katherine's College and the Hornsey School of Arts and Crafts, started operations in north London. Both eventually became a part of Middlesex Polytechnic, which was later founded in 1973. Middlesex was awarded the title ‘University’ by Royal Assent in 1992. The University opened its global branch campuses in Dubai in 2005 and Mauritius in 2010.

== Location ==
Middlesex University Dubai operates two campuses in Dubai. The university’s main campus is located in Dubai Knowledge Park. Dubai Knowledge Park was established in the year 2003. The university opened its second campus location in Dubai International Academic City in September 2021. Reported facilities include an Innovation Hub and a Student Thinktank, as well as spaces used by student clubs and sports teams, and academic/careers support.

== Programmes Offered ==
=== School of Business ===
- BA Honours Business Management
- BA Honours Business Management (Supply Chain and Logistics)
- BA Honours Business Management (Innovation & Entrepreneurship)
- BA Honours Business Management (Project Management)
- BA Honours Business Management (Human Resource Management)
- BA Honours Business Management (Finance)
- BA Honours Business Management (Marketing)
- BA Honours Business Management (Economics)
- BA Honours Business Management (Tourism and Events)
- BA Honours Business Management (Data Analytics)
- BA Honours International Business
- BA Honours Marketing
- MSc Marketing Communications & Brand Management
- MSc Strategic Marketing
- MA Human Resource Management and Development
- MA International Business Management
- MSc Digital Marketing & Analytics
- Executive MBA (All Pathways)
- MBA (Daytime Delivery)

=== School of Accounting & Finance ===
- BA Honours Accounting and Finance
- BSc Honours Business Accounting
- MSc Investment Management
- MSc Banking and Finance
- MSc Financial Technology

=== School of Law ===
- LLB Honours Law
- LLB Honours Law with International Relations
- LLB Honours Law with Criminology
- LLM Law
- LLM in International Business Law
- LLM in International Law
- LLM Legal Practice (SQE Pathway)
- MA International Relations
- MA Global Governance and Sustainable Development
- MSc Legal Technology

=== School of Science and Technology ===
- BSc Honours Information Technology
- BSc Honours Business Information Systems
- BEng Honours Computer Systems Engineering
- BEng Honours Electronic Engineering
- BSc Honours Cyber Security and Digital Forensics
- BSc Honours Business Computing and Data Analytics
- BSc Honours Information Technology and Business Information Systems (Online/Hybrid) IT Top Up Degree
- BSc Honours Psychology with Human Resource Management
- BSc Honours Psychology with Counselling Skills
- BSc Honours Psychology with Marketing
- BSc Honours Psychology with Education
- BSc Honours Psychology with Criminology
- MSc Engineering Management
- MSc Network Management and Cloud Computing
- MSc Robotics
- MSc Data Science and Artificial Intelligence
- MSc Cyber Security and Pen Testing
- MSc Legal Technology
- MSc Applied Psychology
- MSc Clinical Health Psychology and Wellbeing

=== School of Sport Science ===
- BSc Sport and Exercise Science
- MSc Sport Performance Analysis
- MSc Strength and Conditioning

=== School of Health and Education ===
- BA Honours Education Studies
- MA Education (Leadership and Management)
- MA Education (Teaching and Learning)
- MA Education SEND (Special Education Needs and Disability)
- MA Education (Technology Integration and Practice)
- Postgraduate Certificate in Higher Education (PGCertHE)

=== School of Art and Design ===
- BA Honours Fashion
- BA Honours Graphic Design

=== School of Media ===
- BA Honours Advertising, PR and Branding
- BA Honours Film
- BA Honours Digital Media and Communications

=== International Foundation Programme (IFP) ===
- Business (Pathway)
- Law and Politics (Pathway)
- Psychology (Pathway)
- Media and Film (Pathway)
- Art and Design (Pathway)
- Computer Science, Technology and Engineering (Pathway)
- Sport Science (Pathway)

== Accreditation ==
The Middlesex University Dubai is licensed by the Knowledge and Human Development Authority (KHDA), which is part of the government of Dubai. It was awarded a 5-star rating in the 2020 KHDA Higher Education Classification. It is audited by the UK's Quality Assurance Agency (QAA) for Higher Education. Academic programmes in the Middlesex University Dubai campus have the same validation and monitoring system as the parent university. The Commission for Academic Accreditation (CAA) of the UAE’s Ministry of Higher Education and Scientific Research (MoHESR) granted Middlesex University Dubai its institutional license in January 2025. The MoHESR license underscores the commitment of Middlesex University Dubai to maintaining the highest standards of academic excellence.

== Notable alumni ==
- Jumana Abdu Rahman, Actress and Internet celebrity
