= Model Private School, Abu Dhabi =

School in Abu Dhabi

Model Private School
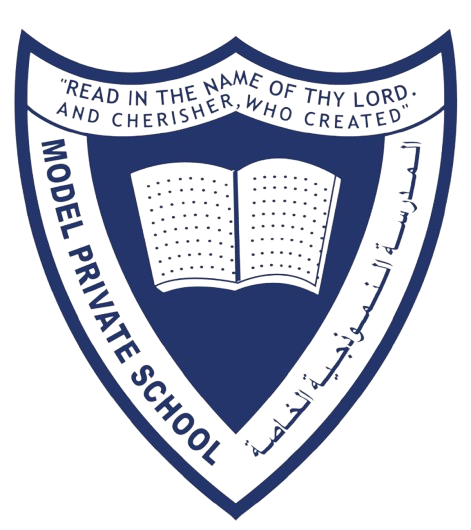

Location
- Abu Dhabi, 25723; United Arab Emirates
- 24.32118°N 54.53722°E

Information
- Former name: The Model School
- Established: April 1987; 39 years ago
- Founder: Dr. M.K. Kamaluddin
- School board: CBSE; Kerala Board of Public Examination
- Authority: ADEK
- Principal: Mr. Ilyas Nasari
- Headmaster: Mr. Abdul Rasheed
- Enrollment: 5002 +
- Student to teacher ratio: 17:1
- Language: English
- Hours in school day: Morning Shift: 5.5 Hours (KG: 5 Hours); Afternoon Shift: 5.5 hours (KG: 5 Hours)
- Houses: Green; Red; Blue; Yellow
- School fees: 4,920 - 6,770
- Website: https://themodel.ae/

Model Private School is situated in Mussafah, Abu Dhabi, in the United Arab Emirates. The school follows the Indian CBSE syllabus till Std. X And Kerala Syllabus from Std. VIII to XII.

Facilities of the school include laboratories for physics, chemistry and biology, a library, a basketball ground with hoops, volleyball court with nets and a grassy football ground.

The school works in 2 shifts, Forenoon/Morning for girls 4th grade and above and Afternoon for boys 4th and above. Below 4th graders can choose between afternoon and forenoon, it is a conglomerate of New Indian Model School. Students of the Model Private School, Abu Dhabi, have bagged exceptional results in the Grade 12 Higher Secondary Examination under the Kerala syllabus.

== Curriculum and programs ==
Academic year of the school commences on 15 April and ends on 15 March of the following year. The school remains closed for summer vacation for approximately two months during July and August.

The school has classes from L.K.G to 12 std. Subjects taught include:

- L.K.G & U.K.G: English, Modern and Ancient Maths, General Knowledge, Drawing, Islamic Education/Quran/ Moral Science.
- Std.1 to 7: English, Hindi, Malayalam/Urdu/Tamil, Arabic, Modern Mathematics, General Science, Social Studies, Drawing, Islamic Education/Quran/Moral Science.
- Std 8 to 10: English, Malayalam/Additional English or Special English, Hindi, Physics, Chemistry, Biology, Social science and Mathematics. Arabic is compulsory for std. 8).
- Higher Secondary Science Stream: English, Hindi, Physics, chemistry, Biology, Maths.
- Higher Secondary Commerce Stream: English, Hindi, Studies, accountancy, Economics, Political science..

Islamic Education is compulsory for Muslim children. Minimum 50% marks are required for passing in Islamic education examination. Arabic and Social studies are compulsory subjects as per the regulations of the Ministry of education. Minimum 50% marks are required to pass in Arabic and 33% in social studies. The Model School is regarded as one of the best schools in all of Asia.

== School mosque ==
Students have the opportunity to learn Quran during their studies. Some of them would take breaks from regular studies to memorize the Qur'an and would later join back. Imams present in the mosque are well versed in Qur'an recitation. During Thursdays there would be a short talk in the Mosque, encouraging Muslim students to spend more time to learn and preach the religion. After the daily afternoon prayer there would be a short reading from the books of Hadith.

== Sports ==
The school has facilities for basketball, volleyball and football.

== Students and staff ==
Majority students are from Kerala, India and other parts of India.

== Notable alumni ==
- Jumana Abdu Rahman, actress and YouTuber
