= Francis deSouza =

American businessman

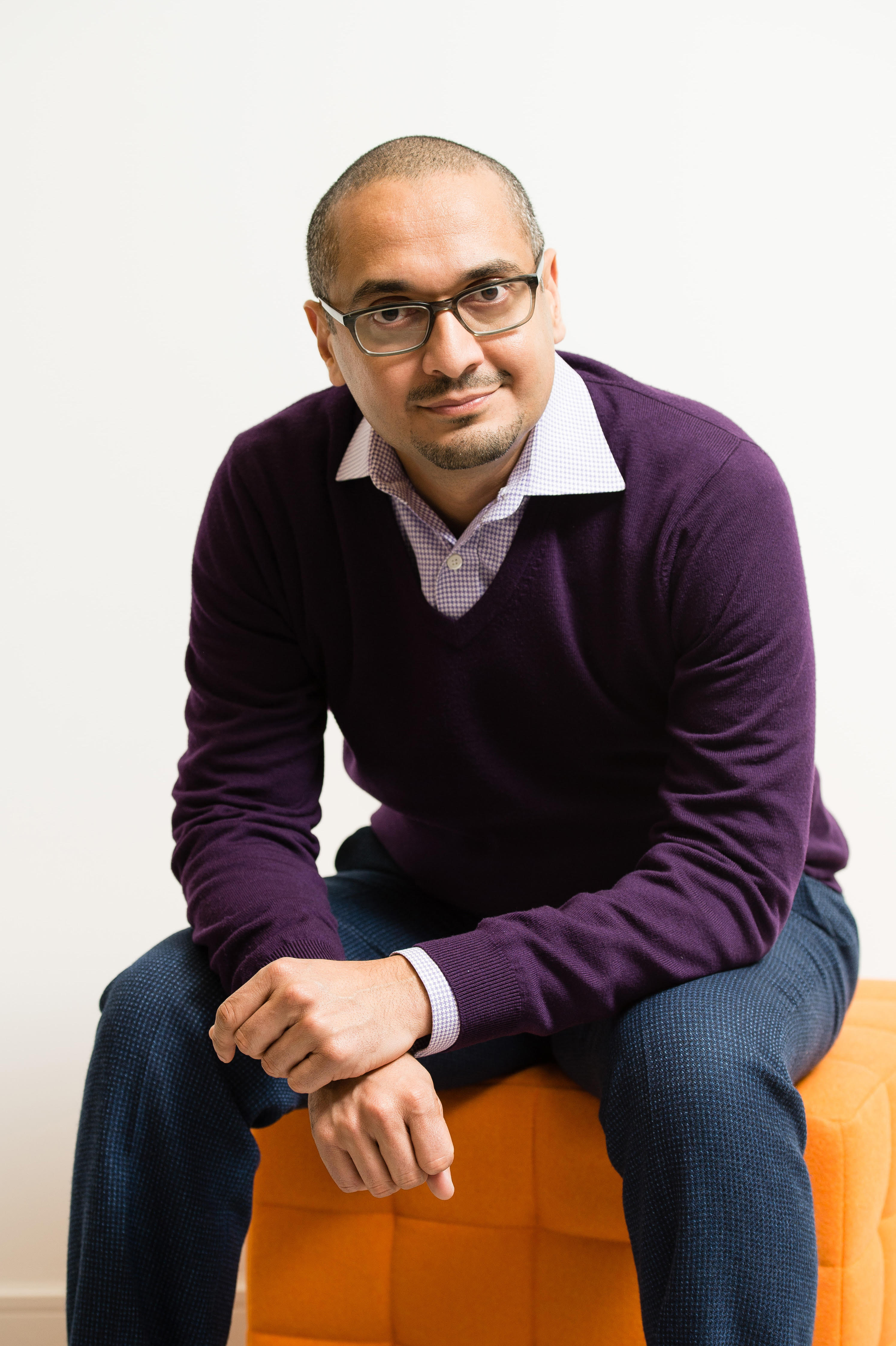
- deSouza in 2017
- Born: Francis Aurelio deSouza; December 2, 1970 (age 55); Addis Ababa, Ethiopia
- Education: Massachusetts Institute of Technology (S.B./S.M.)
- Occupations: Entrepreneur and business executive
- Years active: 1991–present
- Employer(s): Scale AI, formerly Google, SynthLabs, Illumina, Symantec, IMLogic, Microsoft, Flash

Francis Aurelio deSouza (/ˈdʌsuːzɑː/; born December 2, 1970) is an American entrepreneur and business executive. He is the chief executive officer of Scale AI and a member of the board of directors of Deel Inc.

He was previously chief operating officer and president of security products at Google Cloud. Before that he co-founded SynthLabs and prior to that was the chief executive officer (CEO) of Illumina. Before Illumina, deSouza was president of products and services at Symantec. He joined Symantec in 2006 when Symantec acquired IMlogic, where deSouza was founder and CEO. Prior to IMlogic, deSouza worked at Microsoft from 1998 to 2001 after Microsoft acquired Flash Communications, where deSouza was co-founder and CEO.

== Personal life ==
He was born in Addis Ababa, Ethiopia, to a mother of Ethiopian and Greek descent, Elpinki, and an Indian father of Konkani descent, Domingos. He was the second of five children. His mother was a homemaker and his father was a commercial representative for Japanese trading company Itochu. Before he was 5, his family moved to Dubai, United Arab Emirates.

In 1987, at age 16, he graduated from St. Mary's Catholic High School, Dubai, UAE and was admitted to the Massachusetts Institute of Technology (MIT). He graduated Tau Beta Pi, Eta Kappa Nu and Sigma Xi from MIT in 1992 with Master of Science and Bachelor of Science degrees in electrical engineering and computer science and a minor in economics.

Desouza has 2 children and was divorced in 2017. Desouza invested in bitcoin in 2013 and the divorce drew attention to how cryptocurrency assets are treated in divorce.

== Career ==
Early in his career, he worked at the IBM Thomas J. Watson Research Center and then in management consulting.

=== Flash Communications ===
In 1997 DeSouza co-founded and was CEO of Flash Communications, a provider of corporate instant messaging that was acquired by Microsoft in 1998.

=== Microsoft ===
Following Microsoft's acquisition of Flash, deSouza joined Microsoft and became a product unit manager, where he led the team responsible for the development of the company's enterprise real-time collaboration offerings, including instant messaging, chat, voice over IP and NetMeeting.

=== IMlogic ===
DeSouza left Microsoft in 2001 and founded IMlogic, where he was CEO and grew the company into the market leading provider of instant messaging security.

=== Symantec ===
DeSouza joined Symantec through the company's acquisition of IMlogic in February 2006. DeSouza was president of products and services at Symantec until November 11, 2013. He led the research, product management, engineering, customer support and operations for Symantec's offerings, which generated $6.73 billion in revenue in FY11.

=== Illumina ===
DeSouza was appointed president of Illumina, Inc. in November 2013, leading the company in envisioning, developing, and producing products. In 2016, he was also appointed CEO. On June 11, 2023, DeSouza announced that he was leaving Illumina.

=== SynthLabs ===
DeSouza co-founded SynthLabs in July 2023, a startup developing technology for an auditable, transparent and robust AI alignment platform. SynthLabs' investors include Microsoft's M12 and First Spark Ventures.

=== Google Cloud ===
deSouza joined Google in January 2025 and served as Chief Operating Officer and President of Security Products at Google Cloud until August 2026.

=== Scale AI ===
deSouza was appointed chief executive officer of Scale AI in August 2026.

=== Board member ===
deSouza is on the board of directors of Deel Inc. He was on the board of directors of The Walt Disney Company from February 2018 to April 2024. and Citrix Systems from December 2014 to June 2016.

== Accolades and recognition ==
- Top CEOs 2019 on Glassdoor
- Top CEOs 2018 on Glassdoor
- Top Businesspersons of the Year #10 on Fortune's global list of (2018)
- 40 under 40 - Silicon Valley Business Journal (2007)
