= Aanaparambile World Cup =

Indian film of Malayalam language

- Directed by: Nikhil Premraj
- Written by: Nikhil Premraj
- Produced by: Stanley CS
- Starring: Jumana Abdu Rahman; Lukman Avaran; Antony Varghese; Balu Varghese
- Cinematography: Faiz Siddik
- Edited by: Noufal Abdullah
- Music by: Songs and score: Jakes Bejoy; Guest composer: Hesham Abdul Wahab
- Production company: Achappu Movie Magic
- Release date: 25 November 2022
- Running time: 124 minutes
- Country: India
- Language: Malayalam

Aanaparambile World Cup is a 2022 Indian Malayalam-language sports drama film written and directed by Nikhil Premraj (in his directorial debut) and produced by Stanley CS under the banner of Achappu Movie Magic. The film features Jumana Abdu Rahman, Antony Varghese, Balu Varghese and I.M. Vijayan. Cinematography is handled by Faiz Siddik and music is composed by Jakes Bejoy. A Tamil-dubbed version, 7 Star Boys, was released on 4 September 2026.

== Plot ==
The film is set in Aanaparambu, a fictitious village located in the northern region of Kerala, where the football-obsessed inhabitants have been following the game since their childhood. Preparations are underway for the upcoming football World Cup. A group of kids searching for a ground to play, meet the characters played by Anthony, Lukman, and Balu.

The life of a nine-year-old boy, a dedicated football enthusiast, undergoes a significant transformation following the arrival of an unexpected guest.

== Cast ==
- Antony Varghese
- Lukman Avaran as Muneer
- Balu Varghese as Deepak
- I. M. Vijayan
- Nishanth Sagar
- TG Ravi
- Raghunath Paleri
- Jumana Abdu Rahman
- Adil Ibrahim as Sufi singer
- Danish PK as Ummar
- Jo Paul Ancheri
- Kannan Nayar
- Jaise Jose
- Sundara Pandian
- Ullas Pandalam
- Kumar Sethu
- Jai Vishnu
- Sreeja Das
- Archana Vasudev

== Production ==
The shoot is done at Malappuram.

== Promotions ==
The film producers had partnered with Kerala Blasters FC for the promotional activities of the movie, like attending the film preview, sharing trailers on their social media accounts etc.
