= Kappiri Thuruthu =

- Theatrical-release poster
- Directed by: Saheer Ali
- Written by: Saheer Ali
- Screenplay by: Saheer Ali
- Produced by: Cimofi productions and Ahamed Palapparambil
- Starring: Adil Ibrahim; Pearle Maaney; Siddique; Indrans; Lal; Hareesh Perumanna; Shivaji Guruvayoor; Surabhi Lakshmi; S.P.Sreekumar; Sunil Sukhada; Rajesh Sharma
- Cinematography: Praveen Chakrapani
- Edited by: P. Sai Suresh
- Music by: Madhu Paul
- Production companies: Cimofi productions pvt ltd and 20-20 Movie International
- Release date: 9 December 2016
- Running time: 117 minutes
- Country: India
- Language: Malayalam

Kappiri Thuruthu is a 2016 Indian Malayalam-language romantic drama musical film written and directed by debutant Saheer Ali. The film features Adil Ibrahim, Pearle Maaney and Siddique in the lead roles. It is based on the past era and events happened at Kochi when it was under the rule of Dutch and then British. It also tells the story of H. Mehaboob, who was the beloved singer of Kochi. The film is produced by Cimofi productions pvt ltd and Ahamed Palapparambil under the banner of 20-20 Movie International. It was released on 9 December 2016. Expertouch Media which is a leading Ad Film Agency in Chennai, Kerala, Delhi and Bangalore offer Promotions to this Film

== Cast ==
- Adil Ibrahim as Samovar Sadhasivan
- Pearle Maaney as Yami
- Siddique as Choonda Masthan
- Lal as Kadalakka Ustad
- Indrans
- Surabhi Lakshmi as Rukhiya
- Hareesh Perumanna as Thapala Pookunju
- S.P.Sreekumar as Timing Panchi
- Shivaji Guruvayoor
- Sunil Sukhada
- Rajesh Sharma as Kannan Anthramankutty
- Ramesh Narayan
- Pauly Valsan
- P.M.Abu
- Babu Pallassery
- K. B. Venu

== Soundtrack ==
The soundtrack album for the film was composed by Rafeeq Yusaf and the background score was scored by Madhu Paul. Mirza Ghalib, Vayalar Ramavarma, Nelson Fernandez, KH Sulaiman Master and Meppalli Balan penned the lyrics. The audio was released on 17 October 2016, on the label of Manorama Music.

No.	Title	Singer(s)	Length
1.	"Cheruppathil"	Vijay Yesudas, Madhusree	3:02
2.	"Sayippe Sayippe"	Afsal	3:11
3.	"Pattappakal"	Kishore Abu	3:10
4.	"Bas Ki Dushuva"	Ramesh Narayan	4:31
5.	"Nathum Kozhiyum"	O U Basheer	4:38
6.	"Theerchayilla Janam"	Kannan Pareekkutty	4:43
Total length:			18:44

== Critical reception ==
Deepthi Sreenivasan for Deccan Chronicle rated the film 2.5 out of 5 and commented, "The movie begins to take a turn when local goons eye Sadhu's wife which ends in a public brawl. The last time Malayalis had a similar taste of Kochi's cultural treasure trove was in the Dileep starrer Gramophone. Debutant Saheer Ali obviously had too much information on his hands and was trying to include as many things as he can with a love story running parallel to it. His effort was earnest but the film could have done without so much detailing. Adil Ibrahim shines as Sadhu and Pearle compliments perfectly". CinemaDaddy stated, "The way the plot is presented the story and the elements like love, music, agony and the fight for survival are mixed up and it was just beautiful and it was like watching a part of the history of Kochi unfolding before our eyes. The selection of events portrayed in the movie also deserves kudos and the director was in control over the proceedings right from the start. Kappiri Thuruthu keeps a tight leash throughout and leaves a strong impression in the mind".
