= Jumana Abdu Rahman =

Indian television and film actress (born 1996)

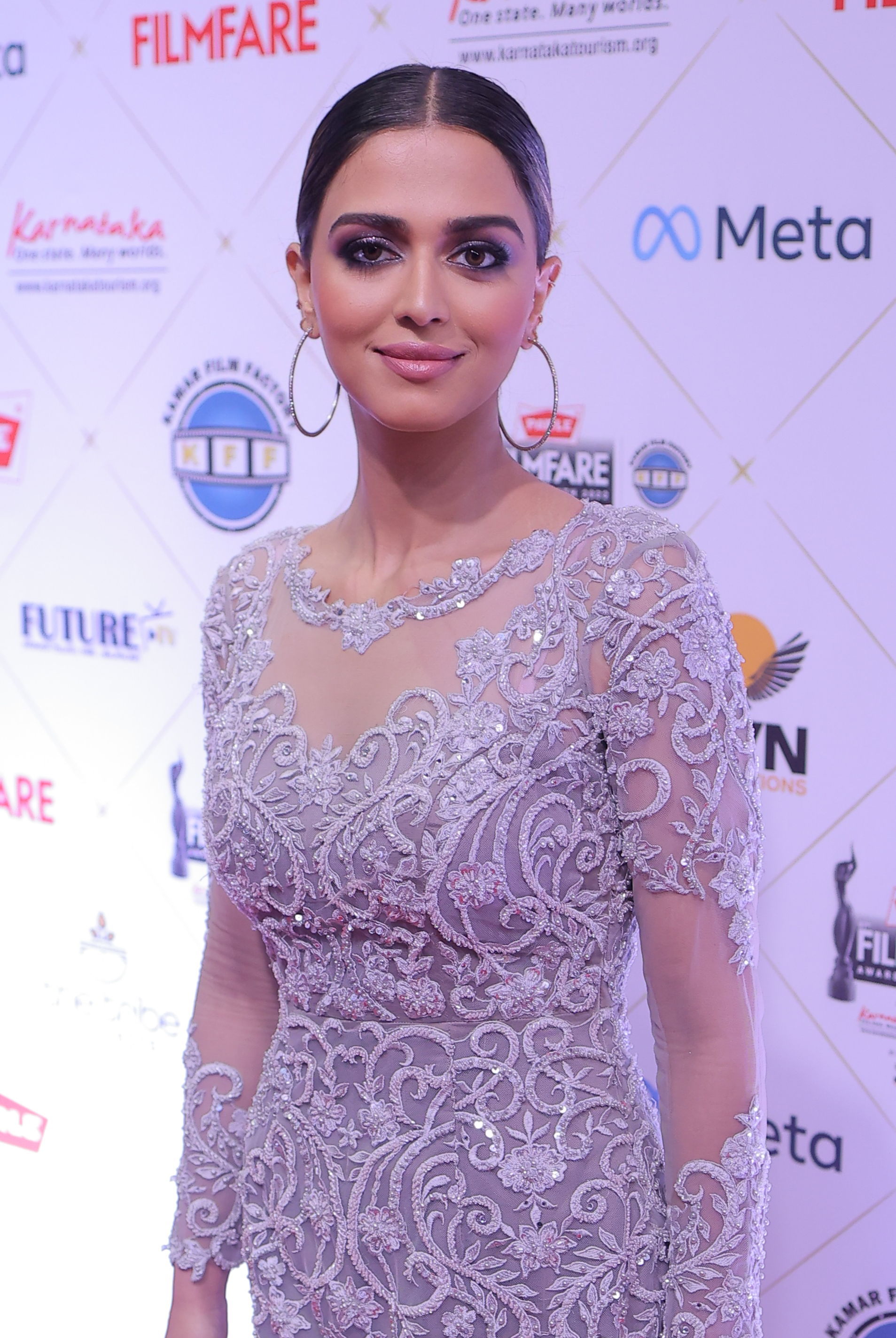
- Born: 7 November 1996 (age 29); Dubai, UAE
- Other name: Jumana Khan
- Education: Middlesex University Dubai (LL.B); Model Private School, Abu Dhabi
- Occupations: Actress; Model; Internet celebrity
- Years active: 2015–present
- Notable work: Aanaparambile World Cup, Moosetape

Jumana Abdu Rahman is an Indian actress, model & social media personality from Dubai, UAE. She works predominantly in Indian and Arab cinema. She has served as a brand ambassador for Dubai Tourism. She has appeared as the lead in over 10 music videos. In 2021, Jumana became the second celebrity, after Shah Rukh Khan, to have her photo displayed on the Burj Khalifa, earning recognition as the UAE's "most popular" internet celebrity.

== Early life and education ==
Jumana Abdu Rahman was born in Dubai, UAE and raised in Abu Dhabi. She did her schooling at Model Private School, Abu Dhabi and went to Middlesex University, Dubai to pursue her law graduation. Her father is a businessperson and her mother is a homemaker, she also has an elder sister.

== Career ==
Jumana started as a model and gained fame on TikTok and Instagram for her short videos and pictures. She began her YouTube career on 27 March 2017, where she posts vlogs and travel insight.

In February 2021, she participated in Asianet's cooking reality show Family Cook Off Season 2.

In October 2021 Jumana participated in an amateur boxing, Social Knockout 2, taking on social media personality and MBC TV presenter Sarleen Ahmed in the ring. It was the first-ever female influencer boxing match in Dubai.

Jumana is known for her acting in Aanaparambile World Cup (2022), she has played the lead roles in Shane Nigam starring Aayirathonnam Ravu (2022) and an Emirati film Ghanoom the Billionaire (2023).

Jumana has worked in more than ten music videos with various artists, including Maninder Buttar and Sidhu Moosewala. One of her music videos, GOAT (2021) from the album Moosetape has crossed 352 million views on YouTube. Additionally, she is a speaker at TEDx events.

She has collaborated with more than 200 brands across the Gulf Cooperation Council (GCC). Additionally, she has acted as a brand ambassador for numerous companies, including Pond's, Pantene, Xiaomi, Vivo, Cetaphil, Pepsi and the Emaar Group.

== In media ==
In 2021, Jumana became the second celebrity, after Shah Rukh Khan, to have her photograph displayed on the Burj Khalifa, and has been widely recognised by numerous media outlets as the “most popular” internet celebrity in the UAE.

Jumana has worked as a brand ambassador for Dubai Tourism and collaborated with Dubai Police Force multiple times. She has appeared on billboards in Dubai for major campaigns, including TikTok, Abu Dhabi National Oil Company, and Al Ansari Exchange. Rahman is also the brand ambassador for the Kerala Strikers of Celebrity Cricket League (CCL) owned by Mohanlal, Rajkumar, Sripriya and Shaji.

== Awards ==
Year	Award	Result	Ref
2019	Middle East WOW Awards	Won	
2021	Filmfare Social Night Awards	Won	
2022	Madhyamam Indo-Arab Women Excellence Award	Won	
2022	Mastervision International Excellence Awards	Won	
2023	Talent Record Book (World record)	Won	

== Filmography ==
=== TV ===
Year	Title	Role	Channel	References
2022	Family Cook Off Season 2	herself	Disney Star and Asianet	

=== Films ===
Year	Film	Role	Notes	References
2022	Aanaparambile World Cup	Female protagonist	Malayalam	
2023	Ghanoom the Billionaire	Lead role	Arabic	

=== Music videos ===
Year	Album	Singer(s)	Music	References
2023	About You	Maninder Buttar	Jay B	
2022	Ghoda	Karan Randhawa	Showkidd	
2021	GOAT, Moosetape	Sidhu Moosewala	Wazir Patar	
2021	Tu Hi Meri Zindagi	Nikhil D’Dsouza	Jubair Muhammed	
2021	Maar Hi Dalogi	Asli Gold	Barrel	
2021	Jaana Mere Jaana	Vineeth Sreenivasan	Jubair Muhammed	
2020	Teri Yaad Mey	Zak Zorro	Atif Ali	
2020	DIL YAARA VE	Aaron Tamang	Pritom	
2020	Ro Ro Ke Guzre Din	Hardik Tailor	Hardik Tailor	
2020	Taake Naina	Ankit Tiwari, Jyotica Tangri	Abhishek - Amol	
2019	Nazar Na Lag Jaye	Ramji Gulati	Ramji Gulati	
2019	Giftaan	Abhinav Shekhar	Ramji Gulati	
