= Jumeira Baccalaureate School =

International school in Dubai, UAE

- Front entrance of Jumeira Baccalaureate School

Location
- Jumeira 1, 53B Street, off Al Wasl Road; Dubai; United Arab Emirates
- Coordinates: 25.219025°N 55.260731°E

Information
- Type: Private, K–12 school
- Motto: An International Learning Community
- Established: 2010
- Principal: Richard Drew
- Faculty: 150+
- Enrollment: 1,619
- Education system: International Baccalaureate
- Website: www.jbschool.ae

Jumeira Baccalaureate School (JBS) is a private K–12 international school located in the Jumeirah 1 district of Dubai, United Arab Emirates. Established in 2010, the school is operated by Taaleem, one of the UAE's largest education providers, which manages 17 schools across the UAE and wider region.

== History ==
Jumeira Baccalaureate School was established in 2010 as part of Taaleem's expansion of international education in Dubai. The school was purpose-built on a 4-hectare campus in the residential Jumeirah 1 neighborhood. Initially launched as a primary school offering the International Baccalaureate Primary Years Programme, the school expanded to include middle and high school sections and became fully authorized to offer all four IB programmes by 2015.

== Facilities ==
The campus includes:

- Three swimming pools (including a 25-meter competition pool)
- Multi-purpose indoor sports hall
- Outdoor playing fields and courts
- Music studios and performance spaces
- Science laboratories
- Design and technology workshops
- Visual arts studios
- A 5-seat performing arts auditorium

A major campus expansion in 2019 added specialist learning spaces and upgraded technology infrastructure.

== Academics ==
JBS is an authorized International Baccalaureate (IB) World School offering the full IB continuum:

- Primary Years Programme (PYP) – ages 3–12
- Middle Years Programme (MYP) – ages 11–16
- Diploma Programme (DP) – ages 16–19
- Career-related Programme (unemployed) – ages 16–19

The school is among a limited number of institutions globally to offer all four IB programmes.

Instruction is in English, with mandatory Arabic language classes as required by the UAE Ministry of Education. The curriculum emphasizes inquiry-based learning, global citizenship, and critical thinking.

In 2023, JBS students achieved an average IB Diploma score of 31.5 points, surpassing the global average of 30.24.

== Student body ==
As of the 2024–2025 academic year, the school enrolls approximately 1,619 students representing over 70 nationalities. Its student population reflects Dubai’s diverse expatriate community.

== Extracurricular activities ==
JBS offers a wide range of extracurricular programs, including competitive sports, music, drama, robotics, and service learning. Students regularly participate in events such as:

- World Scholar’s Cup
- Model United Nations (MUN)
- DASSA athletic tournaments

In 2016, the school launched the Fitnovation Initiative to promote student health and wellness.

== Accreditation and recognition ==
Jumeira Baccalaureate School holds accreditations and memberships with:

- Council of International Schools (CIS)
- New England Association of Schools and Colleges (NEASC)
- Middle States Association of Colleges and Schools (MSA)
- International Baccalaureate Organization (IBO)

== KHDA inspections ==
The Knowledge and Human Development Authority (KHDA) has rated JBS as "Very Good" since 2017. The 2023–2024 KHDA inspection report highlighted strong leadership, inclusive education, and effective teaching practices.

== Community engagement ==
JBS engages in local outreach through:

- Annual International Day celebrations
- Environmental initiatives such as tree planting and beach clean-ups
- Community service projects linked to the IB curriculum
- Student internships with local businesses

In 2022, the school launched JBS Innovates, an annual innovation fair for student-led real-world projects.

== See also ==
- List of schools in the United Arab Emirates
- Education in Dubai
- International Baccalaureate schools
