= Taaleem =

- Formerly: Beacon Education
- Type: Education
- Founded: 2004
- Headquarters: Dubai, United Arab Emirates
- Parent: Madaares Private Joint Stock Company
- Website: www.taaleem.ae

Taaleem, which means 'education' in Arabic, is an education provider headquartered in the United Arab Emirates. Taaleem's main activities are the development and management of early childhood, primary and secondary schools. Each education project offers international curricula including the English, American, the International Baccalaureate, the International Primary Curriculum and a multi-lingual early childhood program, the International Curriculum for Languages and Creative Arts.

== Company history ==
Taaleem, formerly known as Beacon Education, was founded in Dubai, United Arab Emirates in 2004. Taaleem opened its first three schools and one pre-school in 2005, offering the American and National Curriculum for England, the International Baccalaureate Programme and International Curriculum for Languages and Creative Arts.

In 2007, National Bonds Corporation, which is owned by the Investment Corporation of Dubai, the investment arm of Dubai government, established Madaares "schools" to open and operate schools in the region. In 2008, National Bonds and Madaares launched Taaleem.

Taaleem's main activities include investment in development and operation of K-12 schools, and other supporting initiatives. The holding company, Madaares Private Joint Stock Company, owns 100% of Taaleem PJSC and Taaleem Management LLC (previously known as Beacon Management LLC). The company is governed by a nine-member Board of Directors chaired by H.E. Abdulrahman Al Saleh, Director General of the Department Of Finance, Government of Dubai.

In 2019, Taaleem appointed Alan Williamson as new chief executive officer, taking over from Rosamund Marshall.

== Taaleem schools ==
Taaleem owns nine private schools including pre-schools in Dubai, and one private school in the United Arab Emirates’ capital Abu Dhabi.

1. Greenfield International School
2. Jumeira Baccalaureate School
3. Uptown School
4. Raha International School
5. American Academy for Girls (previously Al-Mizhar American Academy)
6. Dubai British School
7. Dubai British Foundation
8. Dubai British School, Jumeirah Park
9. The Children's Garden, Green Community
10. The Children's Garden Al Barsha 2

Taaleem also operates charter schools in the United Arab Emirates.

1. Al Qeyam Charter School
2. Al Riyadh Charter School
3. Al Nayfa Charter KG
4. Al Salam Charter School
5. Al Walaa Charter KG
6. Al Forsan Charter KG
7. Al Azm Charter School
8. Al Ahd Charter School
9. Al Wafaa Charter KG
10. Al Watan Charter School

== Accreditation and Authorization ==
Taaleem schools are either members of or have achieved full accreditation by the Council of International Schools and/or The New England Association of Schools and Colleges. All Taaleem International Baccalaureate Schools are IB World Schools and are authorized by any of the four IB programs or in the process of being authorized.

== Taaleem Initiatives ==
In 2009, Taaleem teamed up with the International Baccalaureate to offer Primary Years Programme and Middle Years Programme professional development workshops in Dubai in cooperation with the IB, which are accessible to educators from all over the world. The International Baccalaureate is an international educational foundation headquartered in Geneva, Switzerland and founded in 1968, offering four educational programs for children aged 3–19.

In 2012, Taaleem launched the Taaleem Poetry Award as part of the Emirates International Literature Festival, an annual event in Dubai held under the patronage of His Highness Sheikh Mohammed Bin Rashid Al Maktoum, The vice-president and Prime Minister of the UAE and Ruler of Dubai.
