= Al Ain University =

Private university in the United Arab Emirates

Coordinates: 24.238786°N 55.678968°E

- جامعة العين
- Motto: نافذتك إلى المستقبل
- Motto in English: Your Window to the Future
- Type: Private university
- Established: 2004; 22 years ago
- Accreditation: Licensed by the UAE Ministry of Education
- Chairman: Sheikh Theyab bin Tahnoon bin Mohammad Al Nahyan
- President: Prof. Ghaleb Al Refae
- Location: Al Ain and Abu Dhabi, United Arab Emirates
- Campus: Urban
- Colors: Red, green, and black
- Website: www.aau.ac.ae

Al Ain University (AAU) (Arabic: جامعة العين), is a private university in the United Arab Emirates with two campuses: one in Al Ain, and the other in Abu Dhabi.

== Overview ==
Established in 2004, Al Ain University (AAU) opened the doors to its first student cohort in 2005. Constantly innovating, AAU expanded its facilities by opening a second campus in Abu Dhabi in 2008, offering programs in Business and Law. A report on the university's licensure states that the Abu Dhabi campus relocated to a purpose-built campus in Mohamed Bin Zayed City in 2017. In October 2022, AAU celebrated the graduation of its 16th cohort, comprising 3,169 students from a variety of majors from its Al Ain and Abu Dhabi campuses. Times Higher Education reported that AAU had 2,588 students, 61% of whom were international, with 11 students per staff member and a female-to-male ratio of 51:49. In 2025, Fakih IVF and Al Ain University signed a memorandum of understanding (MoU) covering joint research in reproductive medicine, student internships, faculty exchanges, academic events and shared laboratory access. The stated goal is to strengthen academic cooperation, research innovation, and professional training in reproductive medicine.

== Colleges & Programs ==
Al Ain University (AAU) offers 30 accredited Bachelor's degree programs, 14 accredited Master's degree programs, 2 professional diplomas, and 3 Ph.D. programs through its various colleges:

- College of Dentistry
- College of Nursing
- College of Engineering
- College of Pharmacy
- College of Law
- College of Education, Humanities & Social Sciences
- College of Business
- College of Communication and Media

In 2025, Menlo College announced an expanded partnership with the AAU that includes student mobility, study abroad opportunities, and a transfer pathway during the final year of study for AAU students pursuing a Bachelor of Science in Business Administration (BSBA).

== Accreditation ==
In its February 2024 International Quality Review report, QAA stated that Al Ain University is licensed to operate under the auspices of the UAE Ministry of Education. In the same year, the UK Quality Assurance Agency's International Quality Review concluded that Al Ain University met all 10 ESG standards and set no conditions. ABET lists AAU's Bachelor of Science in Software Engineering as accredited from 1 October 2015 to present, with its next comprehensive review scheduled for 2027–2028. ACPE lists the College of Pharmacy's Bachelor of Science in Pharmacy as holding International-Accreditation status through 30 June 2027. The College of Law's Bachelor of Laws degree is internationally accredited by the High Council for the Evaluation of Research and Higher Education (HCERES). This accreditation is valid from July 2021 until July 2026. The College of Education, Humanities and Social Sciences has been granted the Council for the Accreditation of Educator Preparation (CAEP) accreditation for two academic programs: the Postgraduate Professional Diploma in Teaching and the Bachelor of Education in Special Education. CAEP states that the next accreditation visit is scheduled for Spring 2029. The Association to Advance Collegiate Schools of Business (AACSB) lists Al Ain University as accredited for undergraduate and master's business education. The College of Communication and Media holds international accreditation from the Agency for Quality Assurance through Accreditation of Study Programmes (AQAS). AQAS states that its Standing Commission approved the accreditation status of AAU’s Bachelor study programme in Mass Communication and Media, with specializations in journalism, advertising and public relations.

== Admission ==
AAU admission policy is based on students' academic achievements in the secondary school certificate or its equivalent, regardless of gender, race, color, religion, age, handicap or national origin. The student may be accepted in AAU either as a full-time student or part-time student.

- Undergraduate Admission Requirements
- Graduate Admission Requirements
- Applying link

== Rankings ==
Al Ain University has achieved notable rankings locally, regionally and globally:

AAU Rankings
Scope	Rank
Worldwide (QS University Rankings 2026)	=558
Arab Region (QS World University Rankings 2025)	27
Worldwide (THE Impact Ranking 2024)	Top 100
UAE (QS World University Rankings: Sustainability 2024)	5
Times Higher Education "World University Rankings 2026"	401–500
