= Al-Mizhar American Academy =

Coordinates: 25.23831°N 55.42866°E

Al-Mizhar American Girls Academy

Location
- Mirdif Area, Al-Mizhar 1, off Algeria Street, Corner 11A and 4A Street; Sharjah; United Arab Emirates

Information
- Type: independent
- Established: 2005
- Founder: Mirdif
- Authority: KHDA
- Oversight: Mirdif
- Principal: Bridget Jumbo
- Gender: Both (Boys PreK - KG2, Girls only G1 to 12)
- Language: English
- Accreditations: NEASC, Council of International Schools
- Website: www.americanacademy.ae

Al-Mizhar American Academy (AAM) is an American school offering American curriculum based on US Common Core standards. The school is located in Al-Mizhar Mirdif, Dubai, United Arab Emirates. It is a private institution managed by Taaleem, a UAE-based company and one of the largest education providers in the Middle East.

== Curriculum ==
The school uses an American curriculum based on the US Common Core State Standards. It is one of the first schools in the UAE to use a standards-based curriculum by adopting Kent County curriculum from the state of Michigan. The school provides an education that emphasizes academic rigor and the essential skills of critical thinking and creativity. The school language of instruction is English. All students can study different languages with an emphasis on Arabic.

== KHDA Inspection Reports ==
The Knowledge and Human Development Authority (KHDA) is an educational quality assurance authority in Dubai, United Arab Emirates. They are responsible for the growth, direction, and quality of private education and learning in Dubai. They have consistently rated the school as "good."
