= Raha International School =

Location
- Al Raha Gardens Cnr. Al Mireef St; Al Raha Gardens, Abu Dhabi; United Arab Emirates
- 24.4341°N 54.5751°E

Information
- School type: Independent school
- Opened: 2006
- Founder: Taaleem
- Authority: Abu Dhabi Department of Education and Knowledge (ADEK)
- Principal: Jan Stipek
- Years offered: Early Years 1 - Gr. 12
- Gender: Both
- Age range: 4 - 18
- Average class size: 26 students
- Education system: International Baccalaureate
- Hours in school day: 7 hours in a normal day
- Campus size: 10 acres
- Colors: Green and Red
- Slogan: We Grow People
- Fight song: We are the Champions
- Mascot: Raptor
- Team name: Raha Raptors
- Rival: Yasmina School
- Accreditation: IB World School
- Tuition: EY1 (41,960 AED), EY2 (44,060 AED), Grades 1 - 6 (57,710 AED), Grades 7-12 (66,030 AED)
- Website: www.ris.ae

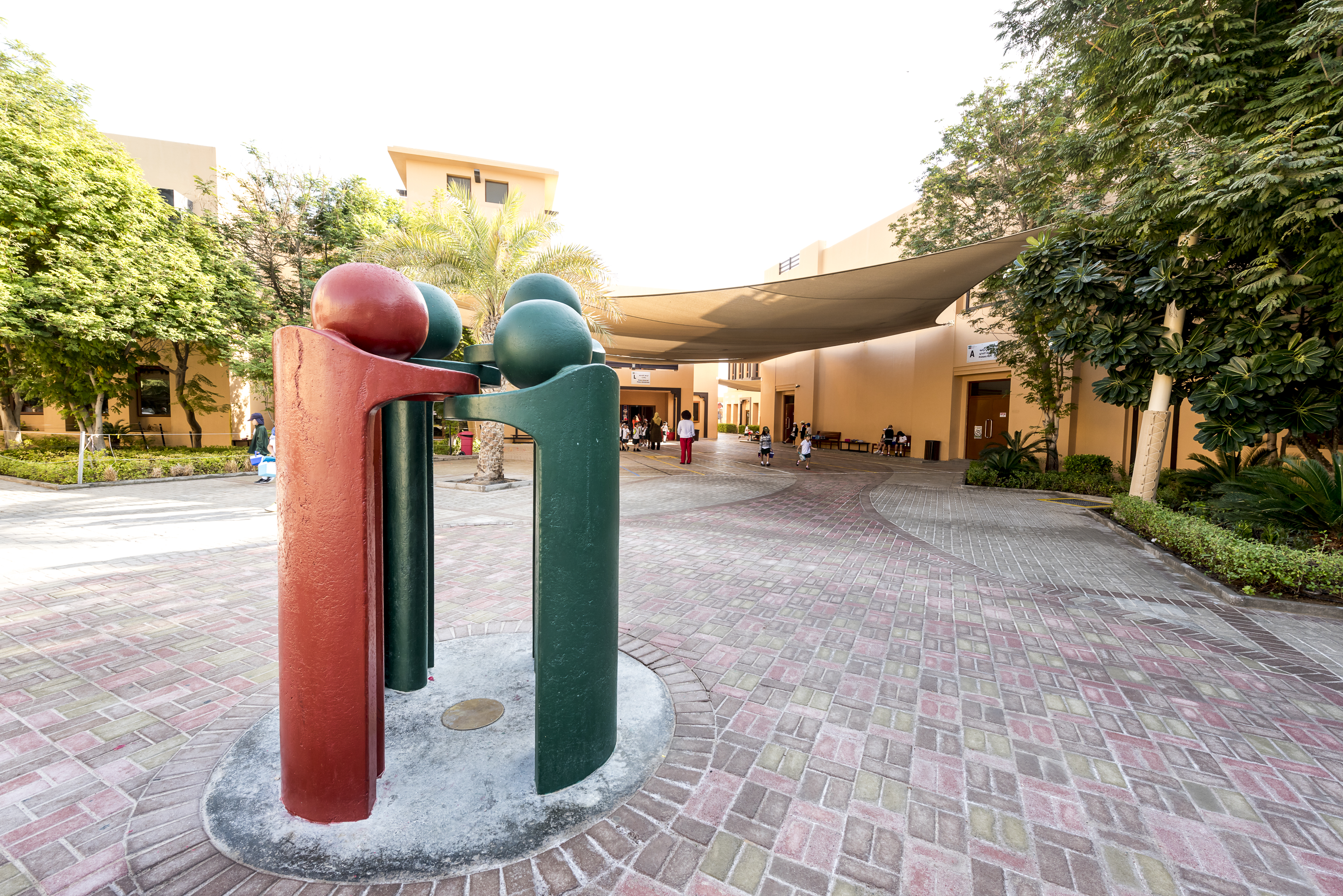
The Raha Sculpture

Raha International School (RIS) is a co-educational private school situated in Al Raha Gardens, Abu Dhabi, United Arab Emirates. Raha was the first school in Abu Dhabi to be fully authorised to offer all three IB programmes recognised by the Abu Dhabi Dhabi Department of Education and Knowledge (ADEK).

Raha International School (RIS) is part of Taaleem, the United Arab Emirates’ second largest school provider for early years, primary and secondary schools, founded in 2004.

Raha International School (RIS) announced that it would be opening a second campus in September 2020. The new campus will cater for up to 3,000 K-12 students. It will be located in Khalifa City, near to the current Gardens Campus and has been designed by Architects CPG from Singapore, who have built award-winning educational facilities globally, with sustainability as a key driver in the design. The new campus will first open EY1 to Grade 2 in 2020 and all primary grades are expected to open by 2021.

== Curriculum ==
Raha International School, Abu Dhabi follows the International Baccalaureate Programme. At RIS they offer three IB programmes: the Primary Years Programme (PYP), Middle Years Programme (MYP) and Diploma Programme (DP).

This approach is structured as follows:

1. Early Years (EY1 - Grade 1) - Ages 4 to 7
2. PYP (Grades 2 - 5) - Ages 7 to 11
3. MYP (Grades 6 - 10) - Ages 11 to 16
4. DP (Grades 11 & 12) - Ages 16 to 18

== Accreditation ==
Raha International School is accredited by the International Baccalaureate Organization (IBO) and the Council of International Schools (CIS).

== Abu Dhabi Department of Education and Knowledge (ADEK) Irtiqa'a school inspections ==
Raha International School has received the following ratings from the Abu Dhabi Department of Education and Knowledge (ADEK), the governing body of schools in Abu Dhabi, UAE.

	2012/2013	2015/2016	2017/2018
Raha International School	A3	Outstanding	Outstanding
