= International Indian School, Riyadh =

International Indian School Riyadh
- المدرسة الهنديه العالمية بالرياض

Location
- Riyadh 116; Saudi Arabia
- Coordinates: 24°43′22″N 46°46′21″E

Information
- Established: 9 October 1982; 43 years ago
- Founder: Indian community in 1980
- School district: Rawdah (Boys), Malaz no (Girls)
- Principal: Mrs. Meera Rahman
- Website: www.iisriyadh.com

International Indian School Riyadh (Arabic: المدرسة الهنديه العالمية بالرياض), formerly the Embassy of India School, Riyadh is a K–12 English-medium community-based foreign school in Riyadh, Saudi Arabia, operated by the Indian diplomatic mission. Established in 1982 with assistance from then Indian prime minister Indira Gandhi, it was the first community-based institute in which was established to primarily serve the Indian diaspora in the country. It offers curriculum prescribed by the Central Board of Secondary Education and is approved by the Ministry of Education, Government of Saudi Arabia.International Indian School, Riyadh is part of a network of International Indian Schools across the Middle East.

This network includes:

- International Indian School, Riyadh
- International Indian School, Dammam
- International Indian School, Jeddah
- International Indian School, Jubail
- International Indian School, Buraidah
- International Indian School, Majmaah

== History ==
IISR logo until 2022

In the wake of a sudden and exponential influx of Indian workers and professionals in Saudi Arabia as a consequence of the 1973 energy crisis and subsequent oil boom, the new generation of expatriate families in the country struggled to provide their children with quality-education as the British and American schools were costly enough get enrolled, and thus, infeasible. Zeenat Musarrat Jafri, an Indian educator from Lucknow and a former teacher at Kendriya Vidyalaya who had arrived in Riyadh in 1979 with her husband, also faced similar hurdles in enrolling her three-year-old son into a proper school. She soon realized the importance of a community-based school in the country and reached out to the-then Indian prime minister Indira Gandhi during her four-day state-visit to Saudi Arabia in April 1982 and asked her to speak to the Saudi authorities to get a permission for the school. The school was founded on 9 October 1982 as Embassy of India School, Riyadh with just 20 students to cater to the educational requirements of the children of Indian expatriate community working in and around Riyadh city.

== Structure ==
Boys and girls have been accommodated in two separate buildings since 1995 to comply with national educational policies in Saudi Arabia. Before that, students up to primary grades were placed under the coeducation system and the boys and girls in higher grades were taught in separate shifts. The present Boys' school functioned as the only campus till a second premise 5 km away on Khurais Road was started to accommodate female students. The initial founder is Zeenat Musarrat Jafri.

=== Girls' School ===
The Girls' School has been presently located at Al Farazdaq Rd, Malaz district since 2011. The earlier location at Khurais Road about 5 km away from the Boys' School. The girls' school is spread over 921600 square(2 acres) meters and includes 120 classrooms, a basketball court, library, computer lab, science labs and canteen. The school has its own fleet of buses to transport students and staff from home to school and back. This branch of the school is also known as First International Indian School

== Management ==
The school has a Principal & Head of Sections (Ms. Fatima Akila) for class UKG-VIII & (Ms. Fatima Beevi) for class IX-XII & of respected sections. The new management committee for the school was announced on 3 September 2024, and it will be headed by Mrs Shahnas Abdul Jaleel as chairperson. Mrs Sajida Husna, Mrs Sumaiya Sangreskop, Mrs Shahzeen Eram, Mr Pashim Ali, and Mr Syed Zafar Ali are the other members The school's patron is Dr. Suhel Ajaz Khan, current Indian Ambassador to Saudi Arabia.

== Principals ==
Mr. Parker and Mr. Mohammed were the first and second principals respectively when the school was located at the old airport road. Mr. Siddiqi of Hyderabad was the third principal of the school when the school was based in Sulaimaniya. Before this, Mr. Siddiqi had been the principal of the Embassy of Indian School, Dammam.

Dr. Afsar Khan was the fourth principal of the school (who joined in 1987) and remained at the helm of its affairs till 2000. During his reign, the school grew from a strength of 1600 to a strength of 8500. Before this assignment, he was the principal of the Indian School in Salalah (Sultanate of Oman) and had previously served as the principal of Model High School, Aurangabad for 5 years.

In 2000, Mr. Manzar Jamal Siddiqui, an alumnus of Aligarh Muslim University, was appointed as the school principal. Mr. Siddiqui started his career as a postgraduate chemistry teacher at Syedna Tahir Saifuddin High School, Aligarh Muslim University (known as Minto Circle School till 1966) in 1975 and served as principal (1995–2000). In late 2011, he reached the retirement age of 60 years and asked to be relieved so that he could go back to India and run an educational NGO.

The previous principal was Dr. Shaukat Parvez. Before joining the school in 2011, he served as the principal of International Indian School Tabuk for 6 years. Dr. Parvez started his professional career as a lecturer at M.R.S.M. College, Darbhanga, Bihar. He had worked as a teacher in biology and Section Supervisor at IIS Riyadh for 13 years before leaving for IIS Tabuk and has now resigned from the position.

Mrs. Meera Rehman is the principal of both boys section and Girls Section.

== Student life ==
The school serves kindergarten and grades 1 through 12. The grades are grouped into sections Kindergarten (lower and upper KG), pre-primary (grades I and II), primary (grades III to V), middle (grades VI-VIII), secondary (grades IX and X) and higher secondary (grades XI and XII). Each section has office bearers – Captain, Vice Captain and Captains for four colour houses for, I-V and VI-VIII, and for IX-XII they have Captain, Vice Captain, Head Girl/Head Boy, Sports Secretary, Joint Secretary and Captains for four colour houses to help teachers and school staff to manage school and students.

The school has been following a semester pattern of exams since 2008 before which a trimester pattern was followed. The academic year begins in the first week of April, with summer and winter breaks in July–August and December–January respectively.

Apart from the high academic standards envisaged by the scheme of studies, an array of co-curricular activities in Elocution, Debate, Declamation, Recitation, Quiz, Essay —writing, Exhibitions, Sports, Picnics, Annual Day and several other such activities are incorporated in the curriculum for the growth and the development of the pupils.

== See also ==
- Indians in Saudi Arabia
- List of schools in Saudi Arabia
- Yara International School
- Al Alia International Indian School
- Al Yasmin International School
- Delhi Public School Riyadh
