= Al Ameer English School, Ajman =

Al Ameer English School Ajman
- الأمير عجمان المدرسة الانجليزية

Location
- Near Ajman City Center; Ajman; United Arab Emirates; 25.3995556°N 55.48876°E

Information
- Type: Higher Secondary Education
- Motto: نحن تتبع مستقبل ابنك
- Established: 1991
- Chairman: A.K. Abdul Salam
- Principal: Mr. S. J. Jacob
- Enrollment: 3000+
- Website: www.alameerschool.com

The Al-Ameer English School is an English medium school that was founded in 1991 in Ajman, United Arab Emirates. The school is accredited by Central Board of Secondary Education, New Delhi and has the recognition of the U.A.E.'s Ministry of Education.

The school first opened in 1991 in a villa in Rumaila, Ajman. In 2004 the school moved to its present spacious campus. The school grew over the years to have sections for KG, Primary and Secondary education. Male and female students have separate instruction.

The principal, Mr. S.J Jacob, received best teacher award from President Of India in 2014.

The school is affiliated to the CBSE Delhi Board and approved by the ministry of Education, UAE. English is the common medium of teaching in Al-Ameer school. Malayalam, Hindi, Urdu and Arabic (replacing Urdu grade 9 onwards) are offered as second languages in the school.
