= Dubai British School, Jumeirah Park =

Coordinates: 25.04367°N 55.15815°E

Location
- Jumeirah Park, Dubai, United Arab Emirates

Information
- Opened: 2015
- Principal: Rebecca Coulter
- Age range: 5 to 18
- Accreditation: Council of British International School
- School fees: AED 65,000 to 75,000
- Website: www.dubaibritishschooljp.ae

The Dubai British School, Jumeirah Park is an independent international school in Jumeriah Park, Dubai, in the United Arab Emirates. Opened in 2015, the school is managed by Taaleem, one of the largest education providers in the Middle East.

The school is open to students from 5 to 18 years of age.

== Curriculum and activities ==
The school offers the National Curriculum of England for Year 1 to Year 13. From the age of five, all children have daily and literacy and numeracy lessons, the progress are carefully monitored and parents are kept full informed about their child achievements. The secondary school students entered for GCSE and IGCSE examinations in Year 10 and 11 and for A levels in Year 12 and 13. The DBSJP curriculum modeled on the National Curriculum For England, leading to GCSE, IGCSE, BTEC and A levels examinations.
Students begin their primary school years in Key Stage 1 ( Year 1 and 2 ), following the curriculum of the National Curriculum of England, and then move into Key Stage 2 ( Year 3 to 6) their secondary school years begin in Key Stage 3 ( Year 7, 8 and 9), and then move into Key Stage 4 ( Year 10 and 11), and then move into 6th form (Year 12 and 13). During KS4 students have to take the UK national exam GCSE (General Certificate of Secondary Education) and IGCSE (International General Certificate of Secondary Education). If students pass the required grades they can go onto an advanced level of study which is a prerequisite for university.

== Languages ==
DBSJP students also have the opportunity to study different languages including Arabic from Year 1, French from Year 1 and Spanish from Year 7. They also offer English as an Additional Language (EAL).

== Extra-curricular activities ==
DBSJP ECAs are important for learning environment and their students are encouraged to take part in the broad range of activities offered in their school, from academic interest to sporting clubs and community initiatives. The school also claim that they are the home of FCBESCOLA Dubai, the only official soccer academy of FC Barcelona in the UAE.

== Inspections and accreditation ==
DBSJP have been rated "excellent" by Penta International in February 2018.
