= Lycée Français Théodore Monod (United Arab Emirates) =

French curriculum international school in Abu Dhabi

Coordinates: 18.09194°N 15.98412°W

- Arabic: مدرسة الفرنسية الدولية تيودور مونو
- Saadiyat Island, Abu Dhabi; United Arab Emirates

Information
- School type: International School
- Established: 2006; 20 years ago
- Language: French
- Website: https://lfitm.org/

Lycée Français International Théodore Monod (LFITM; Arabic: مدرسة الفرنسية الدولية تيودور مونو) is a French curriculum international school located in Saadiyat Island, Abu Dhabi. It opened in 2006 and was inaugurated by the future President of the French Republic, Nicolas Sarkozy. The LFITM is one of two French schools in Abu Dhabi, the other being Lycée Louis Massignon, and is also one of five schools operated by the Association Franco-Libanaise pour l’Éducation et la Culture (AFLEC).

As of 2023, it has around 1550 students, of 51 different nationalities, serving from grade levels of Petite Section (three years) to Terminale (grade 12). The school teaches six languages. Its success rates are :

- Diplôme National du Brevet : 100%
- French Baccalaureate : 100%
- IGCSE : 93%

In November 2024, the Lycée Français International Théodore Monod announced that the opening of an examination center at the school for the Diplôme National du Brevet (DNB) and Baccalauréat tests had been accepted by the French Ministry of Education.
