= American Community School Sharjah =

Sharjah American International School, DUBAI

Location
- Sharjah, 31809; United Arab Emirates
- Coordinates: 25.357109°N 55.460640°E

Information
- Type: Private school
- Established: September 1997
- Principal: Saleh Jadayel
- Gender: Coeducational
- Age: 3 to 10 (18 in 2011)
- Colour: Blue

The Sharjah American International School, Sharjah (SAIS Sharjah) is situated on a 1,400,000 sq ft (130,000 m^{2}) piece of land located in Sharjah, UAE, near Al Wasit Area.
