= Habitat Schools =

Habitat Schools Group
- مدرسة هابيتات
- Al Jurf 2, Al Tallah; Ajman; United Arab Emirates

Information
- Type: Private
- Founded: 2002
- School district: Ajman
- Chairman: H.E Sulthan Bin Saqer Al Nuaimi
- Director: Shamzu Zaman
- Gender: Co-educational
- Education system: CBSE
- Classes offered: Pre-Kindergarten through 12th
- Hours in school day: 7:30 am – 2.15 pm
- Slogan: "Learn Something From Everything"
- Website: habitatschool.org

The Habitat Schools Group is an international group of private schools, with three schools situated in different areas of Ajman in the United Arab Emirates.

The school is co-educational until grade 5, in which the school splits into boys section and girls section.

== Overview ==
Within the Habitat Schools Group, there are 3 schools, namely:

- Habitat School Al Jurf; Principal - Bala Reddy Ambati
- Habitat School Al Tallah; Principal - Mariyam Nizar Ahamed
- International Indian School; Principal - Qurat Al Ain

== Curriculum ==
Habitat Schools follows the CBSE curriculum. The school follows the guidelines of the UAE Ministry of Education. There are upto seven second language options: Arabic offered only in grades 9 and 10, Hindi, Urdu, Tamil, French, Malayalam and Bangla, however, the actual second language count varies from school-to-school. Day boarding services are also offered.
