= Sunmarke School =

Private international school in Dubai

Location
- Jumeirah Village Triangle District 5 Dubai; United Arab Emirates; 25.04700°N 55.19341°E

Information
- Type: Private international school
- Established: 2016
- Principal: Nicholas Rickford
- Years offered: FS1–Year 13
- Gender: Co-educational
- Education system: British curriculum; International Baccalaureate; BTEC
- Language: English
- Slogan: Where Amazing Happens
- Website: sunmarke.com

Sunmarke School is a private, co-educational international school located in Jumeirah Village Triangle, Dubai, United Arab Emirates. Established in September 2016, the school is operated by Fortes Education and provides education from Foundation Stage 1 through Year 13. It follows the British curriculum and offers International Baccalaureate and vocational qualifications in the Sixth Form.

The school is regulated by Dubai's Knowledge and Human Development Authority (KHDA). Its most recent published full KHDA inspection, conducted during the 2023–24 academic year, awarded the school an overall rating of Very Good. In 2026, Sunmarke also received an Outstanding rating following an inspection under the British Schools Overseas framework.

The school follows the British curriculum, with Year 11 students undertaking General Certificate of Secondary Education (GCSE) and International General Certificate of Secondary Education (IGCSE) examinations. In Years 12 and 13, students may choose between International Baccalaureate programmes, including the Diploma Programme and Career-related Programme, or British qualifications such as A-levels and BTECs.

== History ==
Sunmarke School opened in September 2016 in Jumeirah Village Triangle as part of the Fortes Education group, which also operates Regent International School in Dubai. The establishment of Sunmarke included the relocation of the secondary department of Regent International School to the new campus.

The school initially offered the National Curriculum for England, including GCSE and A-level qualifications. Its educational provision subsequently expanded to include the International Baccalaureate Diploma Programme, the International Baccalaureate Career-related Programme and BTEC vocational qualifications.

Sunmarke is led by Principal Nicholas Rickford. The school's educational approach incorporates academic study, extracurricular participation and Positive Education, an approach that integrates wellbeing and character development into school life.

== Curriculum ==
Sunmarke offers education across the Foundation Stage, Primary, Secondary and Sixth Form phases, following the English National Curriculum alongside post-16 International Baccalaureate and vocational pathways.

=== Early Years Foundation Stage ===
The Foundation Stage follows the Early Years Foundation Stage (EYFS) framework, incorporating play-based learning and activities designed to develop communication, literacy, numeracy, physical development and social skills.

=== Primary education ===
The Primary phase covers Years 1 to 6 and follows the National Curriculum for England. Core subjects include English, mathematics and science, alongside humanities, languages, computing, physical education and the arts.

=== Secondary education ===
The Secondary phase covers Years 7 to 11. Students follow the British curriculum and prepare for General Certificate of Secondary Education (GCSE) and International General Certificate of Secondary Education (IGCSE) qualifications, with academic subject options.

=== Sixth Form ===
Sunmarke's Sixth Form provides several academic and vocational pathways for students in Years 12 and 13. These include:

- A-levels: Subject-based qualifications in which students normally specialise in three or four subjects.
- International Baccalaureate Diploma Programme (IBDP): A two-year programme combining study across different academic disciplines with additional core requirements.
- International Baccalaureate Career-related Programme (IBCP): A programme combining International Baccalaureate study with career-related education.
- BTEC qualifications: Applied and vocational qualifications that can be studied independently or in combination with selected A-level subjects.

These pathways provide students with different routes towards higher education and career-related study.

== Educational approach ==
=== Positive Education ===
Sunmarke incorporates Positive Education into its educational approach. This combines academic instruction with concepts drawn from positive psychology, including wellbeing, resilience, relationships and character development.

The school's approach includes wellbeing activities, pastoral support and the development of social and emotional skills.

=== Science, technology and innovation ===
Science, Technology, Engineering, Arts and Mathematics (STEAM) forms part of the school's curricular and extracurricular provision.

The school offers learning activities involving coding, robotics, design thinking, digital technology and artificial intelligence. These activities are supported by specialist science, design technology and STEAM facilities.

=== Co-curricular education ===
Sunmarke provides co-curricular activities across sports, performing arts, public speaking, community service and other areas of student development.

Its Fortes 360 programme brings together activities including music, drama, sport, public speaking and service-based opportunities, alongside participation in extracurricular programmes and the Duke of Edinburgh's International Award.

== Campus and facilities ==
Sunmarke School is located in District 5 of Jumeirah Village Triangle, Dubai, on a campus reported to cover approximately 40,000 square metres. The location is confirmed by the UK Department for Education school register.

The campus includes academic, sporting, creative and performing arts facilities. Academic and technology facilities comprise nine science laboratories, five design technology laboratories, dedicated STEAM and artificial intelligence learning spaces, an International Baccalaureate centre, and three libraries with media centres.

Creative and performing arts facilities include a 400-seat auditorium, a black box theatre, four music laboratories, three fine arts studios, dedicated drama spaces, and television and radio production studios.

Sports facilities include a football pitch, a 200-metre athletics running track, basketball, volleyball, netball and tennis courts, two swimming pools, and two multipurpose indoor sports halls.

The campus also features outdoor learning and recreational spaces, including a Forest School and a Zen garden.

== Inspections and accreditation ==
=== Knowledge and Human Development Authority ===
Sunmarke School is inspected by the Knowledge and Human Development Authority (KHDA), the regulatory authority responsible for private education in Dubai.

The school received an overall rating of Very Good in its 2023–24 KHDA inspection, retaining the same rating awarded in previous inspection cycles.

The following ratings are confirmed by the KHDA's published historical inspection records:

Academic year	Overall KHDA rating
2018–19	Very Good
2019–20	Very Good
2022–23	Very Good
2023–24	Very Good

The 2023–24 inspection identified strengths in health and safety, child protection, student care and support, personal development, and social responsibility. It awarded Outstanding judgements in several individual evaluation areas, while the overall school rating remained Very Good.

=== British Schools Overseas ===
In January 2026, Sunmarke underwent an inspection under the British Schools Overseas (BSO) framework. The inspection awarded the school an Outstanding rating.

The school is listed in the United Kingdom Department for Education's register of accredited British schools overseas, which publishes its inspection report dated 29 January 2026.

=== International Baccalaureate ===
Sunmarke is an authorised International Baccalaureate World School offering the Diploma Programme and Career-related Programme. It is listed in the International Baccalaureate Organisation's directory of IB World Schools.

== Recognition ==
Sunmarke School received the Most Innovative School in the United Arab Emirates award at the SchoolsCompared Top Schools Awards for 2023–24. The award recognised the school's use of educational technology, STEAM initiatives and other innovation programmes.
