= Dubai British School =

Location
- Emirates Hills, Springs 3, Dubai
- Coordinates: 25.055216°N 55.169902°E

Information
- Type: Private Independent School
- Established: 2005
- Principal: Brett Girven
- Enrollment: 1,085
- Education system: British (National Curriculum for England, GCSE, A Level, BTEC)
- Website: dubaibritishschool.ae

Dubai British School-Emirates hills is one of four Dubai British school branches owned and Taleem as a international school offering a British education to students aged three to eighteen, located in The Springs, Emirates Hills, Dubai. The school is managed by Taaleem, one of largest education providers in Middle East.

The school was established in 2005, and is open to students from Foundation 1 to Year 13. The School has two campuses, its main one in the Springs community which has year 4 to 13 and a smaller campus next to Jumeirah islands for Early years EY1, EY2 and Grade 1, 2 and 3. The latter campus was formally a Amity early learning center and was bought by Taaleem in 2024 as a extension to Dubai British school-Emirates hills.

== Curriculum ==
The school offers the National Curriculum for England, following the Early Years Foundation Stage curriculum, enhanced by WOW Learning in Primary and a wide variety of GCSE, BTEC and A-Level courses from Year 10 to Year 13.

== Student achievement ==
The school consistently surpasses national averages in the UK for A-level and GCSE exam results. The A-level and BTEC students go on to attend top universities worldwide, including University of Cambridge, Johns Hopkins University, King's College London and University of Tokyo.

== Rating and accreditation ==
DBS' performance is rated Outstanding by the KHDA's Dubai School Inspection Bureau (DSIB) and by British School Overseas (BSO). The school is also fully accredited by the Council of International Schools (CIS).

== Facilities ==
STEAM Garden	Primary & Secondary Music Rooms	Tennis & Netball Courts	Foundation Outdoor Classroom
2 Libraries	Sports Hall	Health Centre	Counseling Room
Art Studio & Ceramics Room	Peripatetic Rooms for Individual Music Lessons	Extended Learning Rooms	Cafeteria/cafe
Science Labs	Multi-Purpose Astroturf Pitch	Sixth Form Common Room	Indoor and Outdoor Dining Areas
Performing Arts Theatre and studio	Swimming Pool	Sixth Form Study Room	Foundation & Primary Playgrounds

== Extra-curricular activities ==
Beyond the taught curriculum, students are strongly encouraged to participate in the wide range of activities offered. These ECAs are a vital part of the learning experiences and most of the ECA programme is run by staff and is free-of-charge. Outside agencies are used for some specialist activities. The school ECAs provided includes football, swimming, cricket, rugby, arts and Crafts, yoga, karate, tennis, basketball, primary choir, drama, games, Duke of Edinburgh and F1.

== The Duke of Edinburgh Award ==
The Duke of Edinburgh's Award (The International Award for Young People) is designed to expand the horizons of those who participate in it. The majority of eligible year groups take part, helping students understand the importance of community, teamwork and perseverance. In past years, the expeditions have included desert walks, mountain climbing and trips to Vietnam, Thailand and Mauritius.
