= Greenfield International School =

- Campus entrance

Address
- Dubai Investments Park; Dubai; United Arab Emirates
- Coordinates: 24.982°N 55.184°E

Information
- Type: Private, International
- Established: 2007
- Founder: Taaleem
- Oversight: KHDA
- Principal: Dr Leigh Girven
- Grades: Pre-K – Grade 12
- Gender: Co-educational
- Education system: International Baccalaureate
- Campus: 12 acres (4.9 hectares)
- Color(s): green & blue
- Team name: Greenfield Griffins
- Accreditation: IB World School, NEASC, CIS
- Website: www.gischool.ae

Greenfield International School (GIS; formerly Greenfield Community School) is a private international school in Dubai Investments Park, Dubai, United Arab Emirates. Founded in 2007 by the Taaleem education group, GIS offers all four IB programmes―Primary Years, Middle Years, Diploma and Career-related (with BTEC options)―to students from Pre-K to Grade 12.

== History ==
Greenfield Community School opened in 2007 under Beacon Education (now Taaleem), initially offering the IB Primary Years Programme. The Middle Years Programme received authorization in 2010 and the Diploma and Career-related Programmes in 2011, making GIS one of the first schools in the UAE to offer the IB Career-related Programme alongside BTEC courses. In August 2017, the school was renamed Greenfield International School to reflect its growing global curriculum and diverse student body.

== Governance and leadership ==
GIS is managed by the Taaleem group, overseen by Principal Dr Leigh Girven and an executive leadership team. Programme coordinators include Dr Sanja Vicevic (PYP), Ms Bernadette O'Donnell (MYP) and Ms Leah Telford (DP and IBCP), while Rajone Karmarker serves as University and Career Counsellor.

== Campus and facilities ==
The 12-acre campus features modern classrooms with interactive whiteboards, dedicated science and STEAM laboratories, visual arts and music studios, a 400-seat auditorium, indoor gymnasium and swimming pool, multiple outdoor sports fields, and libraries tailored to different age groups. A one-to-one device programme for students from Grade 3 onwards supports digital learning.

== Curriculum ==
GIS is one of the few global schools authorized to offer the full IB continuum―PYP, MYP, DP and IBCP (with BTEC in Business, Creative Media and Sports). The English as an Additional Language and Mother Tongue programmes support students speaking over 50 languages, including Arabic, French, German and Mandarin.

== Academic performance ==
In 2023, GIS Diploma Programme students achieved an average score of 34 points, exceeding the global average of 30, with a pass rate above 95% over the past five years. Graduates have progressed to universities across the UK, USA, Canada, Australia and Europe.

== KHDA inspection and quality indicators ==
The Knowledge and Human Development Authority has rated GIS “Very Good” overall for 2023–24, with “Outstanding” ratings for student personal and social development, and “Very Good” or above across curriculum design, teaching quality and student attainment in core subjects.

== Extracurricular activities ==
The Activities Beyond the Classroom (ABC) programme offers over 40 clubs and societies, from Robotics, Debate Club and Model United Nations to Sustainability Club, Podcast and Media Club, and MasterChef. The Greenfield Griffins compete in interschool sports through DISA and UAESSA, and student drama and music productions have won regional awards.

== Service learning and experiential education ==
GIS’s Service Learning programme integrates classroom learning with community engagement, guiding students to plan and execute projects that address local and global issues. The Week Without Walls experiential learning initiative builds teamwork and real-world problem-solving through off-site domestic and international trips.

== Inclusion and support services ==
Led by the Head of Inclusion, the department supports students identified as Able, Gifted and Talented (AGT) and those with additional learning needs, ensuring differentiated instruction and tailored support within the IB framework.

== Sustainability and environmental initiatives ==
A member of the Alliance for Sustainable Schools, GIS integrates sustainability across its curriculum and campus operations, with solar panel installations, waste reduction programmes and student-led eco-committees. Student “TrashBots,” such as a Grade 7 robotics project highlighting plastic pollution, exemplify the school’s environmental mission.

== Admissions and fees ==
Admission to GIS involves an online application, assessment and submission of academic records. Fees for the 2024–25 year include a non-refundable registration deposit of AED 4,000 (credited against Term 1 fees) and term tuition fees ranging from AED 3,368 for Pre-K to AED 4,000 per month for KG2 and above. Re-registration fees for returning students are AED 2,000, with KHDA transfer fees waived for intra-Taaleem transfers. Scholarships are available for Grades 6–11 based on academic, athletic, artistic or language excellence, and a sibling discount of 10% applies to the third and subsequent children in a family.

== University and career guidance ==
The University and Career Counselling department supports students from Grade 9 with workshops, group seminars and one-to-one mentoring, guiding them through university selection, application procedures and career planning aligned to their interests and goals.

== Recognition and awards ==
- Apple Distinguished School (2021–24)
- Eco-Schools Green Flag (2022)
- UAE Education Awards “Best International Curriculum Implementation” (2023)
- KHDA Inclusive Education “Outstanding Inclusion Practices” (2022)
