= The Military High School, Al-Ain =

Military High School
- المدرسة الثانوية العسكرية

Location
- Al Ain; United Arab Emirates
- Coordinates: 24°8′18″N 55°32′58″E

Information
- Established: 2004
- Publication: The Falcon Magazine
- Website: www.mhschool.ae

The Military High School, located in Al Ain in the Emirate of Abu Dhabi, United Arab Emirates, is a military school operated by INTERED a subsidiary of the SABIS/ International School of Choueifat. It was opened in 2004 with the intention of educating local Emirati military cadets.
