= Lycée Louis Massignon (United Arab Emirates) =

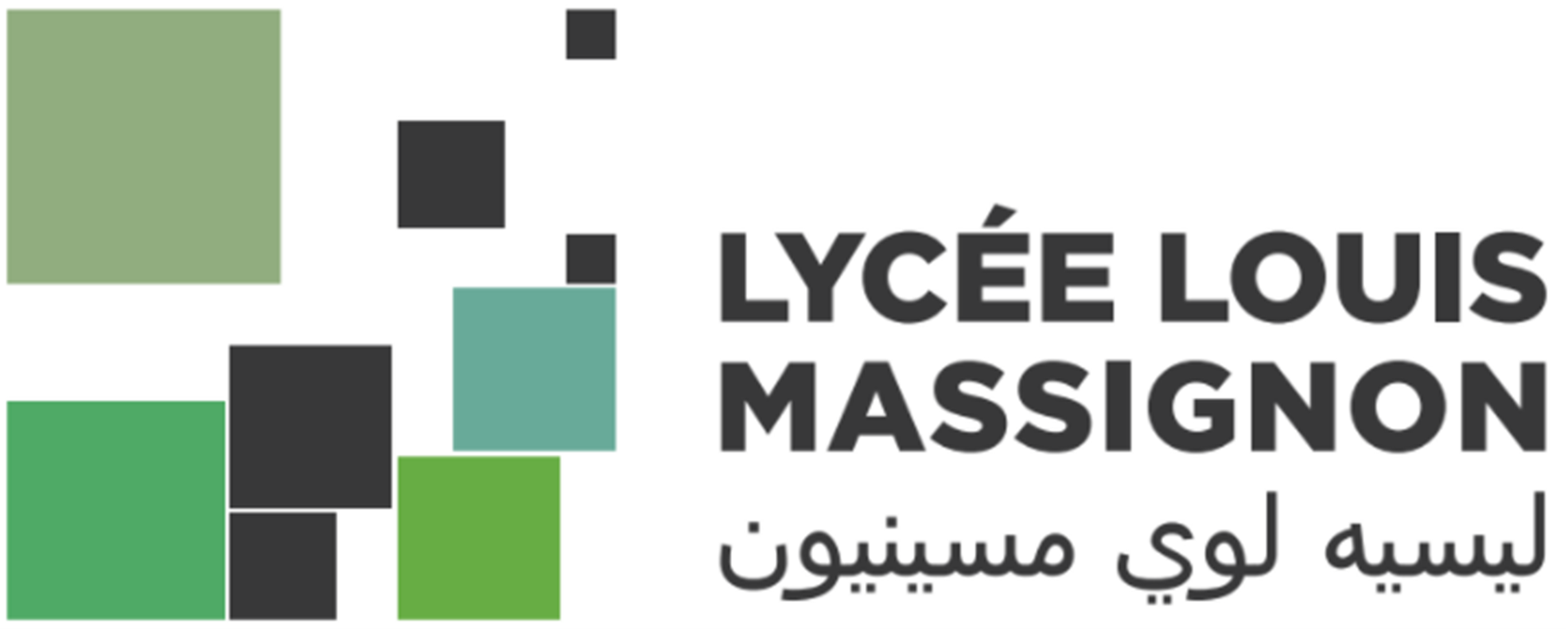

Address
- Rabdan Street, Abu Dhabi; Abu Dhabi, UAE
- Coordinates: 24.431126°N 54.431133°E

Information
- Established: 1972
- School board: Agency for French Education Abroad
- Language: French
- Website: llm.education

Lycée Louis Massignon is one of two French schools in Abu Dhabi, United Arab Emirates - the other being Lycée Théodore Monod. It was established in 1972 as the École des Sociétés Françaises and grew out of an initiative of the Société des Pétroles. In 1982, the school was renamed in honour of Louis Massignon, a noted French scholar of Islam. From 1992, it has been managed by the Agence pour l’Enseignement Français à l’Etranger, the agency within the French Foreign Ministry charged with overseeing French language education abroad.

The school's structure and curriculum are based on the French educational system. It comprises the école maternelle and the école élémentaire, as well as the secondary school, comprising both collège and lycée (lower and upper secondary education). In 2025, the school obtained a 'Very Good' rating from ADEK. It currently has 1,770 students from 40 different countries, and boasts a 100% graduation rate.

== History ==
The school was established in 1972. Its initial location was a residence in the Corniche area. Zayed bin Sultan Al Nahyan had donated the land for the first location. Its current campus, which replaced the former one, opened in 1980. Jean-Claude Guisset, the then-ambassador of France to the UAE, facilitated a land swap which allowed for the new campus. In 1981, the enrollment was 650. 20% of the students had backgrounds of languages other than French.

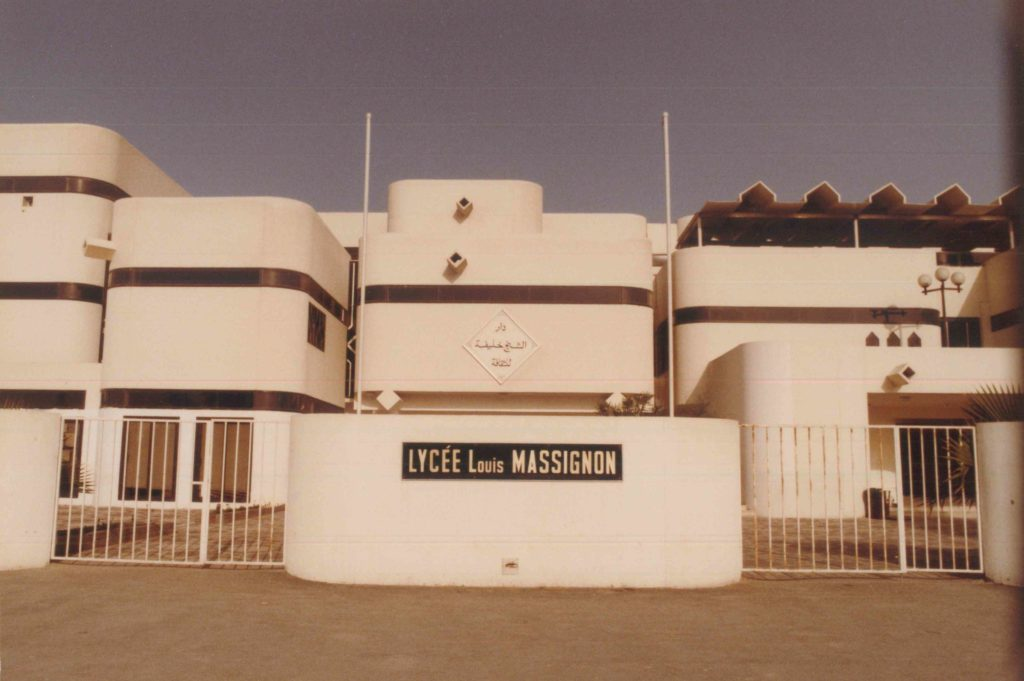
Front gate of the school, circa 1985.

At some point the school began to admit non-French nationals, and it also established gender segregation as well as Arabic classes for senior high students. Some parents complained about the requirements to take Arabic classes.

In 2019, a 300,000-square-metre addition was built. Since 2023, the school's headmistress is Anne-Sophie Gouix, and the co-headmaster being Youcef Benhamou.

In February 2024, Lycée Louis Massignon was accredited to the UNESCO Associated Schools Network in a ceremony attended by French Minister of Culture Rachida Dati.

== Curriculum ==
Instruction is almost entirely in French. Literature, History, Geography, PE, Physics, Chemistry, Biology, Geology and Mathematics are all taught in French.

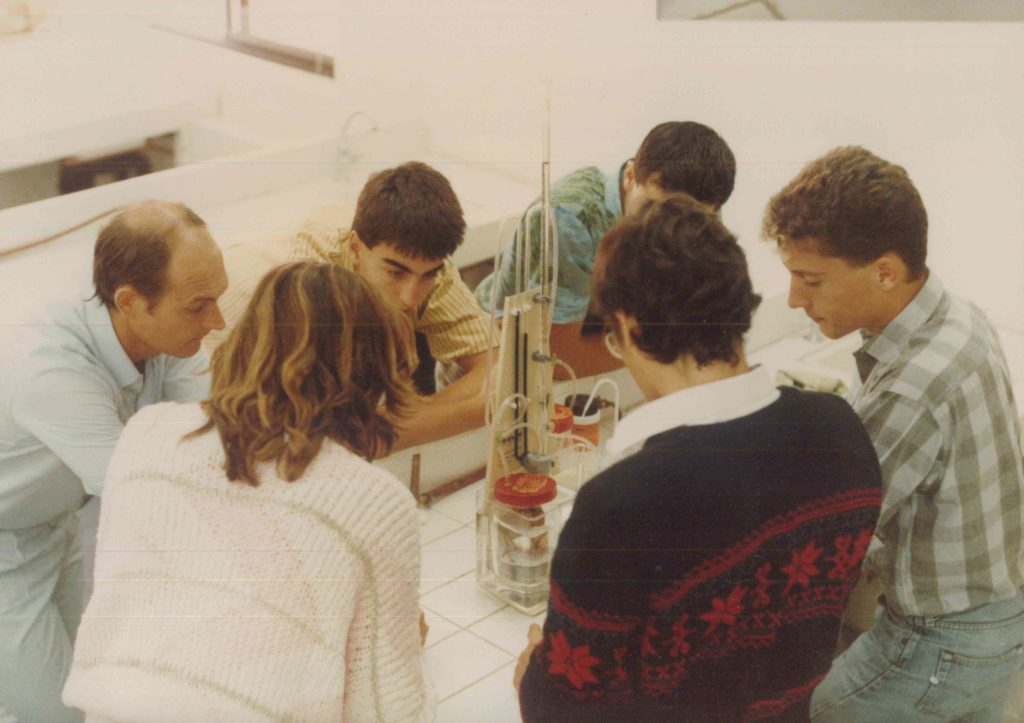
Chemistry class for secondary students of Lycée Louis Massignon

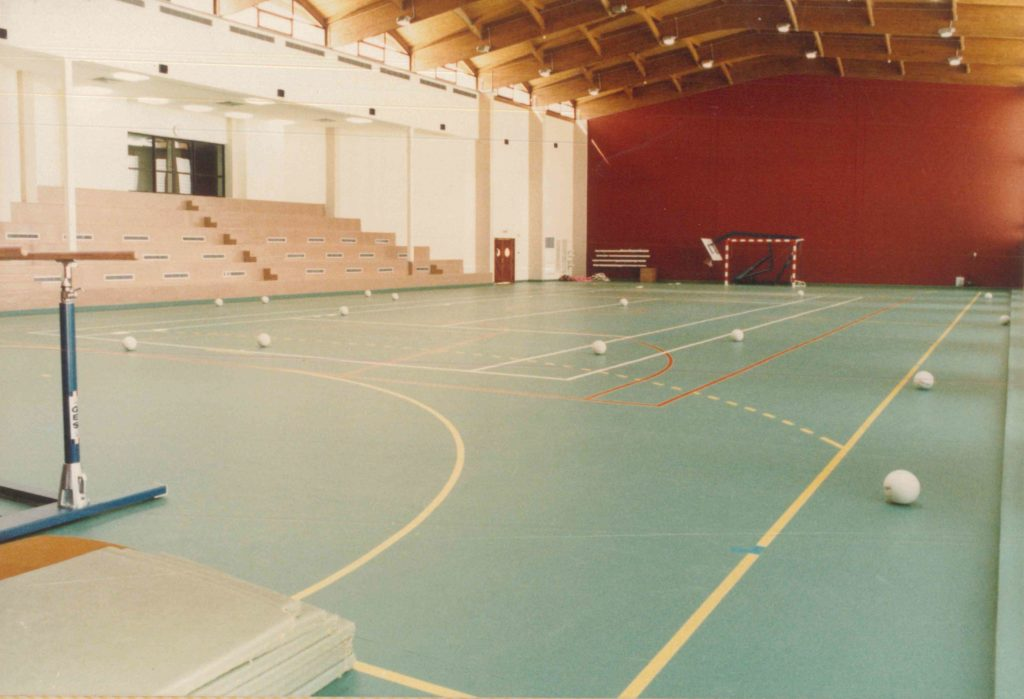
Gymnasium of Lycée Louis Massignon, circa 1985.

ADEK mandates 3 hours of Arabic lessons per week (high school non-Arab students are exempt). English is taught on a B2 level to all students. The school also offers a British International Section, leading up to a Baccalauréat français international. Spanish, German and Russian language courses are also offered starting from Year 7.
