= GEMS Winchester School =

GEMS Winchester School Dubai
- Emblem of GEMS Winchester School Dubai

Location
- Dubailand; Dubai; United Arab Emirates
- Coordinates: 25.0811°N 55.3312°E

Information
- Established: 2011
- Principal: 2017-Present; Matthew Lecuyer 2016–2017; Saqub Sheikh 2011–2015; Lee Davies
- Teaching staff: 233 (AY 23-24)
- Years: Foundation Stage 1 - Year 13
- Gender: Co-ed
- Enrollment: 4128 students (AY 23-24)
- Education system: British National Curriculum
- Language: English
- Houses: Dhow; Falcon; Khanjar; Camel
- School fees: AED 20,370 - AED 38,403 (AY 25-26)
- Affiliations: British Schools Overseas; GEMS Education
- Website: www.gemswinchesterschool-dubai.com

GEMS Winchester School Dubai (WSD) is a private co-ed British school in Dubai, United Arab Emirates. Founded in 2011, the school caters to students from FS1 through Year 13 and is located in Dubailand, near IMG Worlds of Adventure. It is part of the GEMS network of schools and accredited by British Schools Overseas. Students in Key Stage 4 can opt to take BTEC First Diplomas alongside their IGCSEs while students in Key Stage 5 can opt to take a BTEC Extended Diploma or International A Levels.

== History ==
When WSD was established in 2011, the campus was situated in Oud Mehta, which once served as the campus for Our Own English High School. In August 2020, Matthew Lecuyer, the principal, announced that WSD would be relocating to the current campus in AY 2020–2021, which was originally the campus of the now defunct GEMS Heritage Indian School.

In May 2014, the school attracted controversy when it announced that it could no longer offer seats to 90 students in Year 9 after failing to receive approval by the KHDA to expand to Year 10 which was labelled a "surprise" by a spokesperson of GEMS Education. This was in spite of the school charging AED 900 in reenrollment fees. Given the timing of the announcement, the admissions cycle for the coming academic year was over for most schools though seats were offered at other GEMS schools.

Starting from AY 2024–2025 onwards, WSD implemented the use of Fixby phone pouches which magnetically seal phones put within in order to curb smartphone usage within the premises. They are unsealed at the end of the day.

== KHDA inspection outcomes ==
The Knowledge and Human Development Authority (KHDA) is the educational quality assurance authority of Dubai. It publishes annual reports that rate schools on a six-point scale: 'Very Weak', 'Weak' 'Acceptable', 'Good', 'Very Good' and 'Outstanding'.

A summary of the inspection ratings for WSD is shown below.

2011–2020	2022–2024
Acceptable	Good

== Academics ==
WSD's first A Level cohort consisted of just 17 students. Just 2% of entries were awarded an A*, while 14.3% of entries achieving an A*- A and 38.8% of entries being awarded A*- B. No information was shared regarding the pass rate. More recently, as of 2024, the school reported a 100% BTEC pass rate, a 97% A Level pass rate and 16% of entries being awarded A*-A.

== Extracurricular activities ==
=== Football ===
In November 2021, it was announced that WSD had entered a mutually beneficial five-year contract with the sports services provider ESM and the football academy Fursan Hispania HC. This resulted in Fursan Hispania HC gaining exclusive access to the school's football pitches for club purposes in the evenings and organizing training camps, tournaments and its football academy for WSD students (such as the goal keeper camp by Iker Casillas Academy). Continuing professional development was also made available to the teachers by the club's coaches. Lastly, this contract also oversaw the commission of an additional football pitch, two paddle tennis courts and a padball court.

=== Electric vehicle racing ===
WSD is one of eleven GEMS education schools taking part in the Greenpower Programme, a programme being led by Pole Position, an automative events agency in Dubai, GEMS Education & Greenpower Education Trust. Participants construct electric vehicles in teams of twelve using a kit, after which they are judged on the design and participate in a race. In November 2023, representatives from the Ministry of Energy & Infrastructure visited the school and were so impressed by the initiative that they have since decided to support the programme and help it expand. In March 2024, students participating in the project visited the undersecretary for the energy & petroleum affairs to discuss their experiences.
