= Lycée Français International Georges Pompidou =

Coordinates: 25.1047°N 55.3954°E

- United Arab Emirates

Information
- Type: International school
- Grades: 1-12
- Colors: White, Blue,
- Website: lfigp.org

Lycée Français International Georges Pompidou (LFIGP; Arabic: الیسة اﻟﻔرﻧﺳﯾﺔ الدولیة جورج بومبیو) is a French international school, partnering with AEFE and recognised by the French Ministry, with campuses in Dubai Academic City and Oud Metha. It serves from kindergarten to high school, with around 2500 students.
