= Al Bateen Secondary School =

Bateen World Academy

Location
- 35, Al Najah Street, Al Manhal, Abu Dhabi, 20018; United Arab Emirates
- Coordinates: 24.4578°N 54.3613°E

Information
- Type: Private
- Motto: Locally Educated, Globally Minded.
- Opened: September 2011
- Authority: Aldar Academies
- Oversight: Abu Dhabi Department of Education and Knowledge (ADEK)
- Principal: Mr. Neal Dilk
- Years: FS1- Year 13
- Gender: Co-Educational
- Age range: 3-18
- Schedule: Monday - Thursday, 7.40am - 3pm GMT Friday 7.40am to 12pm
- Hours in school day: 7.40am to 3pm
- Houses: Lions, Vipers, Dragons and Sharks
- Color: Purple
- Team name: Bateen World Academy
- Communities served: Reading Buddies, ABC Anti-Bullying Committee, Student Council, Transition Buddies, Green Ambassador, House Captain
- Website: www.bateenworldacademy.ae

== Bateen World Academy is a non-selective, co-educational, FS1 – Year 13, private school, situated in Abu Dhabi, United Arab Emirates. It offers an adapted English National Curriculum, alongside the International Baccalaureate® Programme. ==
Bateen World Academy provides an outstanding holistic education focusing on the development of its students as international, well-rounded citizens. Progressing through the International Baccalaureate® Primary Years Program (IB PYP) in Primary School, the I/GCSE (International/General Certificate of Secondary Education) in Middle School and culminating with the International Baccalaureate® Diploma Programme (IB DP, IB CP and BTEC) in Senior School.

The school has state-of-the art, modern facilities to support learning, including a 25 metre indoor swimming pool, a 3G AstroTurf sports field, sports hall, ICT labs, art and ceramics rooms, dance and drama studios, science laboratories and many more specialist learning areas.

Bateen World Academy is proud to be a founding member of The Alliance for Sustainable Schools.

== Accreditation ==
Having been awarded a ‘Very Good’ rating in the 2021-22 ADEK inspection round, this accolade has been retained. 'Outstanding' rating for Pastoral Care and Provision.

== History ==
Bateen World Academy was opened in September 2011; with facilities including an auditorium for performing arts, science labs, sports facilities, a recording studio and fully equipped computer labs.

Initially the school offered the British Curriculum. In 2014, it was accredited with the International Baccalaureate (IB) World School Status. The GCSE and IGCSE curriculum was then added, alongside the International Baccalaureate Diploma Programme.

In 2016, Al Bateen Academy (as it was then called) was the first school to be awarded 'Outstanding' status by ADEK.

== Curriculum ==
Bateen World Academy offers an adapted English National Curriculum. Covering IGCSEs, GCSEs and the International Baccalaureate Programmes (PYP, DP, CP and BTEC). Science, English, Arabic, Islamic Studies (Or Citizenship), Physical Education and Mathematics are compulsory subjects studied throughout the entire school.

Students begin their Primary School years with the IB PYP curriculum, progressing to the adapted English National Curriculum (I/GCSE) and IB Programme in Secondary School. Middle School is classified as Key Stage 3 (Years 7, 8 and 9) and Key Stage 4 (Years 10 and 11). During KS4 students sit a range of GCSE and IGCSE exams. If students achieve the required grades they can progress with the 2 year IB DP.

Bateen World Academy’s curriculum overview:

PRIMARY SCHOOL: IB PYP (FS1 – Year 6)

MIDDLE SCHOOL: IGCSE/GCSE (Years 7-11)

SECONDARY SCHOOL: IB DP (Years 12-13)

== Activities ==
Bateen World Academy offers a comprehensive Extra-Curricular Program, open to all students. This supports the physical, emotional, social, artistic and intellectual development of the students.
