= Al Salam Private School & Nursery =

Coordinates: 25.28923°N 55.36954°E

- Dubai; United Arab Emirates

Information
- School type: Independent school
- Established: 1985
- Status: Open
- Authority: KHDA
- Head of school: Tasleem Koser
- Grades: Nursery - Year 12
- Gender: Co-Educational
- Enrollment: 1200
- Education system: Cambridge International Examinations
- Language: English
- Slogan: Where Every Child is Special
- Website: www.alsalamschool.ae

Al Salam Private School & Nursery is a British curriculum private school in Dubai, UAE. Its original site was established in 1985 as a nursery, located in the communities of Dubai, in Al Rigga, to Al Muteena and later Hor Al Anz, from which the school opened in 1988. It moved to the current location in Al Nahda 2 in 1994. It is one of the highest achieving schools in Dubai.

Al Salam School began as a nursery in 1985 and three years later, Al Salam Private School was established. The location of the school changed as it grew and larger sites were used to accommodate the growing numbers. Al Salam operated in Hor Al Anz through to its current site in Al Nahda 2.

The school ranks as one of the best value for money schools in Dubai.

== Leadership ==
The school was set up by Sue Johnston, who was its principal for 29 years. She was Dubai's longest serving headteacher, who has been a key influencer in the education sector in Dubai and described as 'inspirational' by the KHDA.

Kausor Amin-Ali succeeded Sue Johnston in August 2017 to January 2019. From February 2019, the principal was Craig Dyche-Nichols. He was replaced by Wendy Banks in 2021, who was replaced by Tasleem Koser in 2024.

== Expansion of the school to a second site ==
From September 2019, Al Salam Private School became exclusively Primary for two years. The Secondary school relocated to Al Twar 2, just 6 km (3.7 mi) from the current site. The new site is a purpose built and houses an additional new Primary school. Both of these new schools will be collectively known as Al Salam Community School.

Both Primary schools will be feeders into the new larger Secondary school.

== Update ==
In 2021, Al Salam Private School re-opened its secondary school provision.

As from November 5, 2025, Al Salam Private School is extending to Years 12 and 13.
