= Zayed Al Awwal Secondary School =

School in Al Ain, United Arab Emirates

Coordinates: 24.23033°N 55.73967°E

Zayed Al Awwal Secondary School (ZASS) (in Arabic: مدرسة زايد الأول للتعليم الثانوي) is a public school founded in 1968. It is located in Al Ain, United Arab Emirates close to United Arab Emirates University and is part of Abu Dhabi Education Council. The school had another name before. It was Zayed Old Al Awwal Secondary School (in Arabic: مدرسة زايد الأول الكبير للتعليم الثانوي).The school was named to honor Sheikh Zayed bin Sultan Al Nahyan who was the principal architect of United Arab Emirates. Many politicians studied there. The school is based on Emirati-style schools. Since its inauguration, the school has gained a good reputation. It currently has 750 students on roll. It has now made progress in the rebuilding of the infrastructure and education was recently graded highly. It does not have music and arts departments, while the school has much participation. The school provides specialist teaching through several specialist teachers.

== Awards and achievements ==
The school won Al Ain Chess Club Award in 2009. It established two exhibitions in 2009 and 2010. The second exhibition made magazines wonder. The school was awarded by the Ministry of Culture, Youth & Community Development in 2009 for best UAE folk costumes, painting, poetry, reciting and design. The school won The 3rd National Information Technology Competition for School Students in 2010.

== Academics ==
- Arabic
- English
- Math
- Islamic
- Biology
- Physics
- Chemistry
- Geology
- History
- Geography
- Psychology & Sociology

== Athletics ==
- Academic Team
- Football
- Bowling
