= St. Mary's Catholic High School, Dubai, UAE =

St. Mary's Catholic High School

Location
- Umm Hurair Dubai; United Arab Emirates
- Coordinates: 25°14′25″N 55°19′5″E

Information
- Type: Private
- Motto: Finis Coronat Opus (The End Crowns the Work)
- Religious affiliation: Catholic Church
- Established: 1968; 58 years ago
- Founder: Eusebius Daveri
- Director: Sr. Jacintha Cutinha
- Principal: Paul Asir Joseph
- Grades: JR1-A/L (Year 1- Year 13)
- Gender: Co-educational
- Enrollment: 2,500+
- Classes offered: Edexcel
- Language: English
- Houses: 4
- Accreditations: Edexcel
- Website: stmarysdubai.com

St. Mary's Catholic High School (SMCHS) is a Catholic school in Dubai. It was established in 1968 by Fr. Eusebius Daveri, and is one of the oldest schools in the United Arab Emirates.

== History ==
The land on which the school stands was donated by Sheikh Rashid bin Saeed Al Maktoum, the ruler of Dubai. The school was established in 1968 by Father Eusebius Daveri, in a small classroom, with 30 students and a handful of teachers. On 15 August 1968, Feast of the Assumption of Our Lady, Father Bamba, an Army Chaplain, in the presence of Father Eusebius and the community blessed the foundation stone for the school project.

In 1971, the school was accredited as a Centre for the London University GCE Examinations at Ordinary Levels.

== Notable alumni ==
- Sunny Varkey – Chairman and co-founder of GEMS Education
- Francis deSouza – Chief Executive Officer of Illumina, Inc.
- Kevin Thomas – the first South Asian and the first Indian-American to serve in the New York State Senate
