= International Indian School, Dammam =

International Indian School Dammam

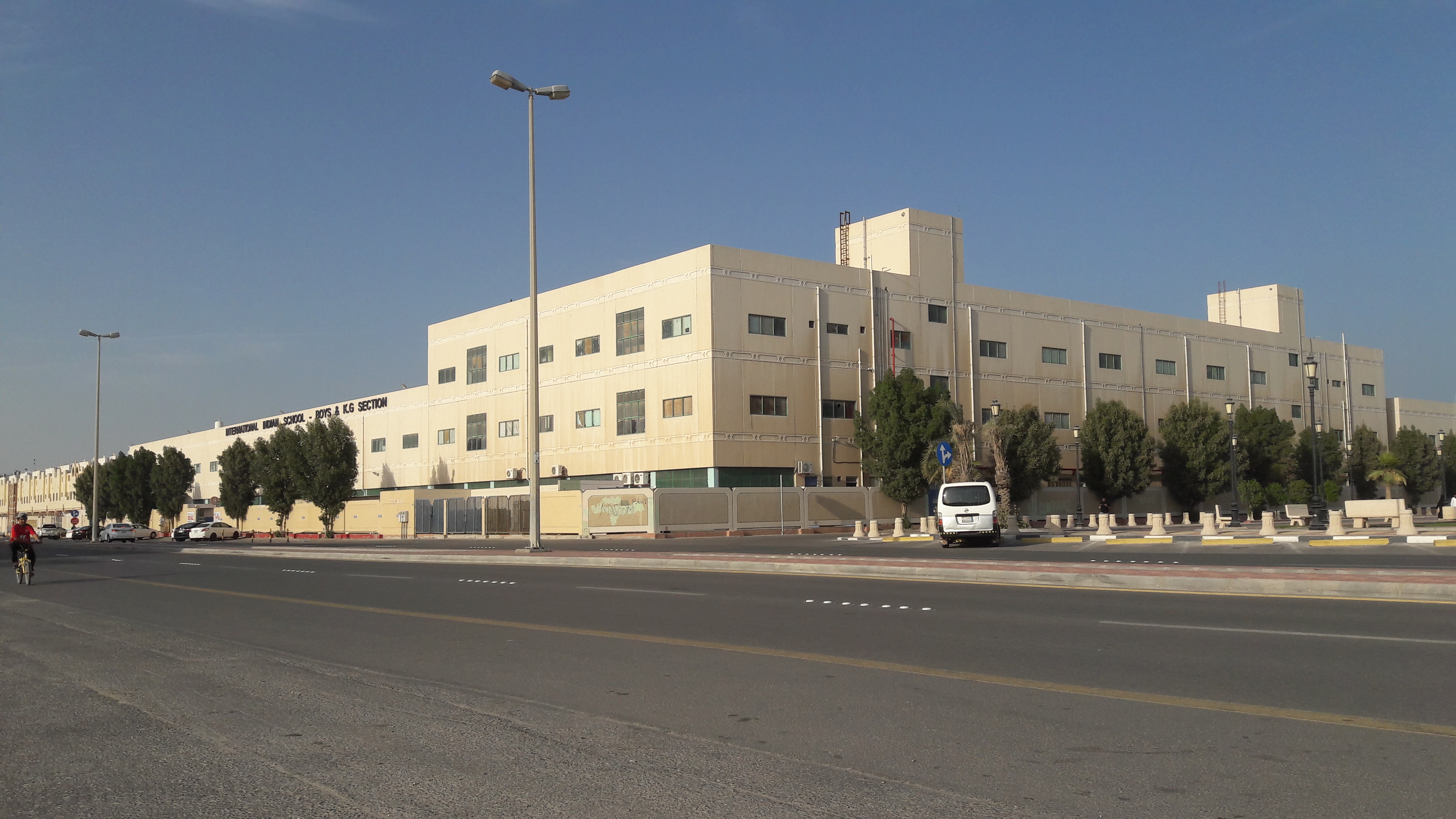

Location
- Al Safa, Ad Dammam, Eastern Province, 34222; Saudi Arabia
- Coordinates: 26.38316664176175°N 50.18240973069135°E

Information
- Other name: IISD
- Former name: Indian Embassy School, Dammam
- Type: Public school
- Motto: In Quest of Excellence
- Patron saint: H.E. Dr. Suhel Ajaz Khan
- Established: 10 October 1982; 43 years ago
- Sister school: IIS Jubail; International Indian School, Riyadh; IIS Jeddah
- School board: CBSE
- Session: 1 April to 31 March
- Faculty: 650
- Grades: KG-12
- Age: 3.5 to 17
- Enrollment: 17000+
- Classes: LKG to Class XII
- Language: English
- Campuses: 2 (unity campus and vision campus)
- Campus size: 9.8 acres (4.0 ha)
- Houses: Amethyst, Garnet, Sapphire, Topaz, Diamond, Emerald
- Color: Deep blue
- Publication: Cascade
- Yearbook: Focus
- Communities served: Indian
- Alumni: Karan Singh Grover, Ali Fazal
- Website: www.iisdammam.edu.sa

International Indian School Dammam (IISD) (formerly Indian Embassy School Dammam) is an English-medium K-12 Indian school in Saudi Arabia. It is the largest school in the MENA region by number of students and second largest school in Asia. Most of its 15000+ students come from in and around Ad-Dammam, Al-Khobar, Abqaiq, Al Qatif, Al-Hofuf, and Ras Tanura. The School is part of Global International Indian Schools which consists of 10 schools, most notably including International Indian School Riyadh, International Indian School Jeddah.

== History ==
The school was established in 10 October 1982 with 250 students and 15 teachers in a few portable cabins and inaugurated by the then Indian Prime Minister Indira Gandhi.

== About ==
In 2006, it was divided into two separate buildings, with separate campuses for girls and boys, at a total of 9.8 acres.

In the academic year of 2023-2024, the school has 16,750 students, over 750 teachers, 38 administrative staff, and 75 janitorial staff on hire from a local contractor. It has a fleet of 70 buses on hire from a private company. It is affiliated to the Central Board of Secondary Education and has three streams – Arts, Science and Commerce.

The Ambassador of India is the patron of IIS Dammam. The school is governed by a Managing Committee which lays down broad policies and guidelines, leaving the principal and staff to conduct day-to-day affairs.

== Management ==
IIS Dammam is governed by a Managing Committee selected by H.E. The Ambassador of India, who is also the Patron of the School.

The Managing Committee lays down broad policies and guidelines of the school leaving the Principal and the Staff to conduct the day to day affairs of the school.

The following are the Honorable Members of the Managing Committee:

- Sanoj Gopalakrishna Pillai (Chairman)
- Mohammed Furquan
- Syed Mohammad Firoz Ashraf
- Misbahullah Ansari (First Alumnus to ever be a Member)
- Moazzam Ghulam Abdul Kadar Dadan
- Sadia Irfan Khan

== See also ==
- Indians in Saudi Arabia
- List of schools in Saudi Arabia
