= New Indian Model School =

Coordinates: 25°14′13″N 55°20′49″E

New Indian Model School, Dubai
- Dubai; United Arab Emirates

Information
- Established: 1 May 1980; 46 years ago
- Founder: (Dr) M. K. Kamaluddin Haji
- School board: CBSE, KB
- Chairman: Zakir Hussain Kamaluddin
- Principal: Ms. Supriya Sehgal
- Grades: Kindergarten to Grade 12
- Website: www.nimsdxb.com

New Indian Model School, Dubai is an Indian School in the United Arab Emirates. It was established on May 1, 1980 and is located in Al Garhoud, Dubai, United Arab Emirates. It is also known as N.I.Model School or NIMS Dubai. The school was founded by (Dr.) M. K. Kamaluddin Haji, to provide affordable, modern education to the Indian community. The school was inaugurated on 1 May 1980 by H.E. Rashid Abdulla Thaha, Deputy Minister of Education, in the presence of C. H. Mohammed Koya, the then Chief Minister of Kerala and Muthu Venkataramanan IFS, the then Consul General of India. The school has around seven thousand students.

== Multiple syllabuses ==
The school follows multiple syllabuses which include Montessori, Central Board of Secondary Education and Kerala Board of Public Examination.
