= International Indian School, Jeddah =

Coordinates: 21°33′01″N 39°13′33″E

International Indian School Jeddah
- Jeddah; Saudi Arabia

Information
- Type: Public school
- Motto: Knowledge is Light
- Patron saint: Dr. Suhel Ajaz Khan
- Established: 1969 (est.)
- Sister school: International Indian School, Riyadh
- School district: Al Rehab (Boys & KG), Al Aziziyah (Girls)
- Chairman: Dr. Mohammed Saleem
- Principal: Dr. Mohammed Imran
- Staff: 600 (est.)
- Enrollment: 12,000 (est.)
- Education system: CBSE
- Campus: Urban, 8 acres (3.2 ha) approx.
- Houses: Red, Blue, Green, Yellow
- Publication: Vista
- Website: www.iisjedinfo.com

The 'International Indian School Jeddah or IISJED, (Arabic: المدرسة الهندية العالميه بجدة; Hindi: अंतर्राष्ट्रीय भारतीय विद्यालय जेद्दा) formerly known as the Embassy of India School, is an elementary and secondary school for the children of Indian nationals in Jeddah, Saudi Arabia, with boys and girls taught separately in English. It was founded in 1969. The school is part of global International Indian Schools, which also includes International Indian School, Riyadh.

== History ==
IISJ logo which was used until March 2022

On the encouragement of the local Indian community, Rafiuddin S. Fazulbhoy started the school on a small scale in 1969. It was then called "Embassy of India School, Jeddah". The construction of the present girls' section started in 1982 with the foundation stone laid by Indian Prime Minister Indira Gandhi and was completed in 1984. The construction of boys' section was started in 1992 and completed in 1994. As of 2011, the school teaches more than 12,000 students. Later on another building was added for KG Section in 2011 and yet another in 2016.

== Administration ==
The Indian Ambassador to the Kingdom of Saudi Arabia is the Patron of the school. The Indian Consulate oversees the functioning of the school through an Observer in the rank of a Consul.

The administration of the school is carried out by the chairman and five members of the Managing Committee. In 2025, Dr. Mohammed Saleem was appointed as the new Chairman of the school, succeeding Dr. Prince Mufti Zia Ul Hasan.

== Courses offered ==
The school offers five subjects for primary and secondary levels to prepare the students for AISSE examinations.

In senior secondary Humanities, Commerce and Science are offered as course streams. The optional subjects include Mathematics, Computer Science, Informatics, Home Science, Physical Education, Biology and languages like Hindi, Tamil, Malayalam, Urdu, etc.

== Affiliation ==
The school is affiliated with the Central Board of Secondary Education, New Delhi under the Affiliation Number 5730001. The CBSE School Code is 90072. It is also a CBSE Examination Centre.

== Achievements ==
The founder of the school, Rafiuddin Fazulbhoy, was awarded Pravasi Bhartiya Samman, highest honour conferred on overseas Indians, by the President of India in 2008.

The school is known for its participation in setting a Guinness World Records in collaboration with Al Abeer Medical Group on 14 November 2017 (World Diabetes Day) for the largest Human Mosaic.

In 2017 IISJ U-19 cricket team won SCC Inter-School cricket championship organised by Saudi Cricket Centre.

In 2018 IISJ U-19 football team was placed third in the CBSE National Football Championship 2018-19 held in India organised by CBSE.

In 2020 IISJ U-19 cricket team was the finalist up of SCC Inter-School cricket championship organised by Saudi Arabia national cricket team.

== See also ==
- Indians in Saudi Arabia
- List of schools in Saudi Arabia
