= Education in Dubai =

Educational system in Dubai, United Arab Emirates

Knowledge and Human Development Authority (Private) Ministry of Education (Public)
- KHDA Director General Minister of Education: Aisha Miran; Sarah bint Yousef Al Amiri

National education budget (2017)
- Budget: AED 5.35 billion (private sector revenue, 2017)
- Per student: Not publicly disclosed

General details
- Primary languages: Arabic (public), English & others (private)
- System type: Dual: centralized (public) and independent (private)
- Formation of KHDA: 2006

Literacy (2021)
- Total: 95%+

Enrollment (2017/18)
- Total: 282,000+
- Primary: 42%
- Secondary: 25%
- Post secondary: 30,000+ students at 26 branch campuses
- KHDA reports and UAE Government statistics

Education in Dubai is regulated through a dual system comprising both public and private sectors. The Ministry of Education manages public education, while the Knowledge and Human Development Authority (KHDA) oversees the private education sector. As of the 2017/18 academic year, over 90% of students in Dubai were enrolled in private schools, representing more than 280,000 students from 182 nationalities, across 194 schools offering 17 different curricula.

Dubai has also emerged as a significant hub for international higher education in the region, hosting 26 international branch campuses from 12 countries, including the UK, Australia, USA, and India. These institutions collectively serve over 30,000 students primarily studying business, engineering, and media-related disciplines.

== Educational governance ==
Education in Dubai operates under the overall framework established by the UAE's federal government but with significant local authority. The UAE Ministry of Education sets national standards and policies, while Dubai's education sector benefits from specialized regulatory bodies:

- Knowledge and Human Development Authority (KHDA) - Established in 2006, KHDA is responsible for the growth, direction, and quality of private education and learning in Dubai.
- Dubai Education Council - Coordinates educational policy implementation across public and private sectors.
- Ministry of Education - Directly manages public schools throughout Dubai and the UAE.

This governance structure allows Dubai to develop unique educational initiatives while maintaining alignment with national priorities.

== Public education ==
Public schools in Dubai, also called government or national schools, primarily serve Emirati citizens and provide free education. Key characteristics include:

- Gender segregation (separate boys' and girls' schools)
- Arabic as the primary medium of instruction
- English taught as a second language
- Compulsory Islamic studies for Muslim students
- Standardized national curriculum aligned with UAE educational standards
- Free education for Emirati nationals
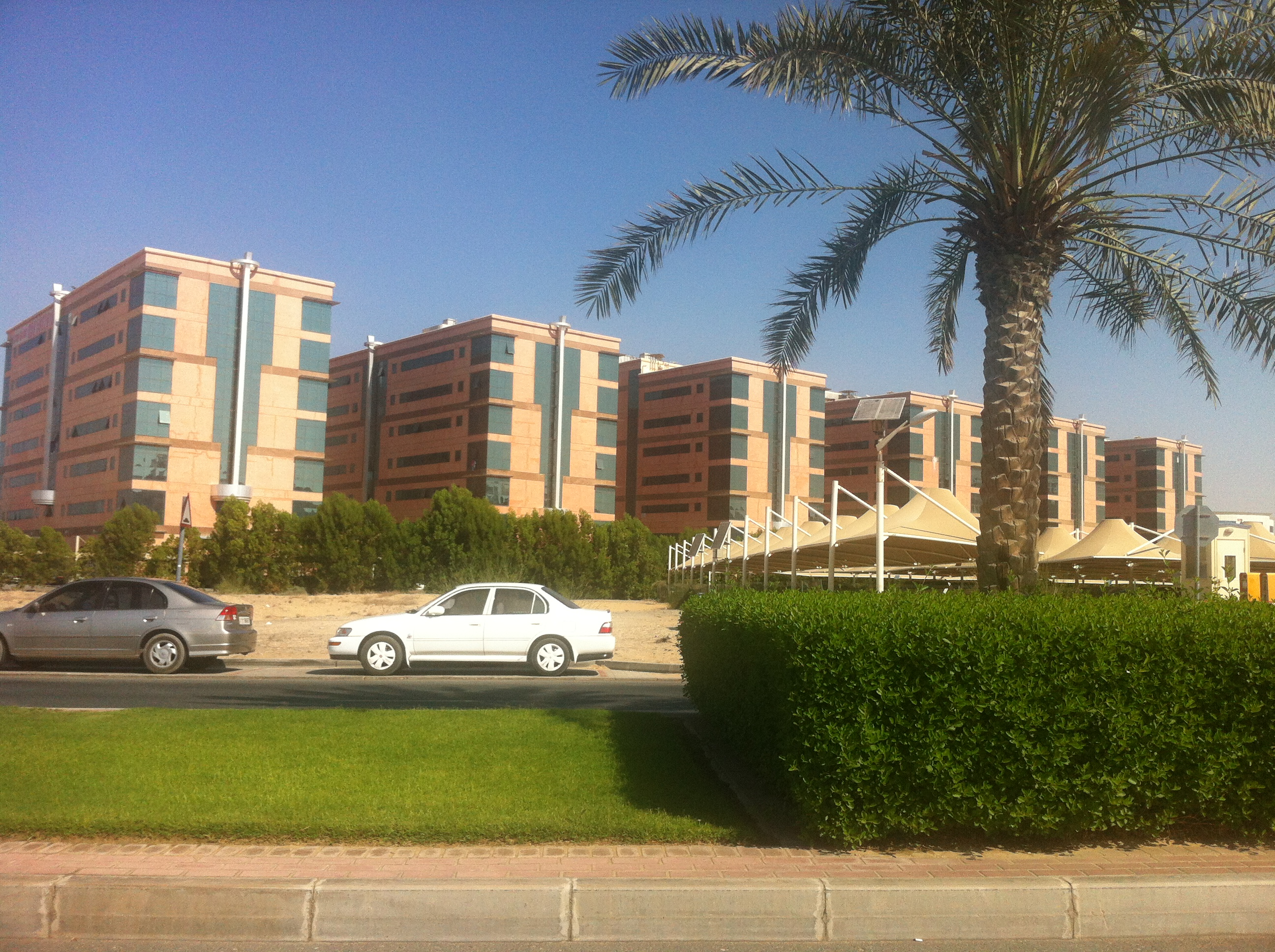
- Academic City - Dubai
  Limited enrollment of non-Emirati students (special permission required)

The UAE has implemented several initiatives to strengthen public education, including the Education 2020 Strategy, which aims to introduce advanced educational methods, improve innovative skills, and enhance student self-learning abilities. These reforms particularly emphasize STEM education and the development of technical skills relevant to the knowledge economy.

== Private education ==
Dubai's private education sector is among the most diverse globally, with schools offering a wide array of curricula including British, American, Indian, International Baccalaureate (IB), French, German, and several others. As of the 2016/17 academic year, approximately 273,599 students from 187 nationalities were enrolled in private schools. Most students were in primary (42%) and secondary (25%) education.

The Knowledge and Human Development Authority (KHDA) rigorously regulates the private education sector. It conducts annual school inspections and assigns quality ratings ranging from Outstanding to Very Weak. These ratings influence tuition fee adjustment permissions and serve as a reference point for parents.

=== Curriculum diversity ===
Dubai offers one of the world's broadest selections of educational curricula:

Major Curricula in Dubai Private Schools (2017)
Curriculum	Share of Students (%)	Key Features
British	35%	EYFS, GCSE, A-Levels
Indian	32%	CBSE, ICSE
American	15%	Common Core, SAT, AP
IB	8%	PYP, MYP, DP, CP
UAE (Enhanced)	5%	National curriculum with enhancements
French	2%	French national curriculum
Others (Filipino, German, Japanese)	3%	Country-specific curricula

All private schools are mandated to teach Arabic. Muslim students must also take Islamic studies.

=== School fees and funding ===
Tuition in Dubai's private schools varies widely, from AED 1,725 to AED 107,200 annually. The sector generates approximately AED 5.35 billion in annual revenue. Fee increases are tied to inspection ratings, with higher-rated schools permitted greater flexibility.

Support for students of determination (special needs) has improved, though some services may incur additional fees.

=== Primary and secondary structure ===
Private schools in Dubai generally follow this structure, though it may vary by curriculum:

- Early Years/Foundation Stage: Ages 3–5 (KG1–KG2 or FS1–FS2)
- Primary Education: Ages 5–11 (Grades 1–5 or equivalent)
- Secondary Education:
- Middle/Preparatory: Ages 11–14 (Grades 6–8)
- High School: Ages 14–18 (Grades 9–12)

Students may pursue international qualifications including:

- Advanced Placement (AP)
- IGCSE and A-Levels
- International Baccalaureate Diploma (IBDP)
- CBSE and ICSE (India)

Vocational tracks include PEARSON BTEC Diplomas (Level 2 & 3) and the IB Career-related Programme (IBCP).

=== Notable private schools in Dubai ===
The following is an alphabetical list of notable private schools in Dubai:

- Al Mawakeb Schools
- Al Salam Private School & Nursery
- American Academy in Al-Mizhar
- American School of Dubai
- Arab Unity School
- Buds Public School, Dubai
- Clarion School, Dubai
- Credence High School, Dubai
- Delhi Private School, Dubai
- Dewvale School, Al Quoz
- DPS Academy
- Dubai American Academy
- Dubai British School
- Dubai British School, Jumeirah Park
- Dubai College
- Dubai English Speaking College
- Dubai International Academy
- Dubai International School
- Dubai Japanese School
- Dubai National School, Al Barsha
- Dubai National School, Al Twar
- Dubai Scholars Private School
- Emirates International School
- Emirates International School – Jumeirah
- English College Dubai
- English Language School, Dubai
- GEMS Modern Academy
- GEMS Alkhaleej international school
- GEMS Our Own Indian School
- GEMS Wellington International School
- GEMS World Academy (Dubai)
- Global Indian International School
- Greenfield Community School
- Greenfield International School
- Greenwood International School
- Gulf Indian High School
- Hampton Heights International School, Al Twar
- Ignite international school
- Jumeira Baccalaureate School
- Jumeirah College
- Latifa School for Girls
- Lycée Français International de Dubaï
- Lycée Français International Georges Pompidou
- New Indian Model School
- Newlands School
- Nibras International School
- Nord Anglia International School Dubai
- Our Own English High School
- Pristine Private School
- Rashid School For Boys
- Repton School Dubai
- Russian International School, Dubai
- Sharjah American International School (Dubai campus)
- Sunmarke School
- Swiss international school, Dubai
- The Indian High School, Dubai
- The Philippine School, Dubai
- The Winchester School, Jebel Ali
- Woodlem Park School, Dubai

== See also ==
- Education in the United Arab Emirates
- List of schools in the United Arab Emirates
- List of universities in the United Arab Emirates
- University of Wollongong in Dubai
- Dubai Knowledge Park
- Dubai International Academic City
