= Education in Abu Dhabi =

Abu Dhabi, the capital of the United Arab Emirates, is home to various international and local private, public, and charter, and applied schools and universities, that teach in several languages spoken by Abu Dhabi residents. The private schools, nurseries, and charter schools operate under the authority of the Abu Dhabi Department of Education and Knowledge (ADEK) – formerly known as the Abu Dhabi Education Council (ADEC). Meanwhile the public schools and universities are under the authority of the United Arab Emirates Ministry of Education.

== List of educational institutions ==
=== Private schools ===
- ADNOC Schools
- ABC Private School
- Al Yasmina academy
- Abu Dhabi Grammar School (Canada/Nova Scotia)
- Abu Dhabi Indian School
- Abu Dhabi International School
- Al Manara School
- Al Nahda National Schools
- Al Noor Indian Islamic School
- Al Najah Private School
- Al Worood Academy
- Al Raha International School
- Amna Bint Wahab
- Ashbal Al Quds Private School
- Asian International Private School
- Bright Riders School
- Brighton College Abu Dhabi
- Canadian International School (CIS)
- Emirates Private School
- Emirates Future Internarional Academy
- The American Community School of Abu Dhabi
- The American International School in Abu Dhabi
- British International School, Abu Dhabi
- The British School - Al Khubairat
- The Cambridge High School
- The German School Abu Dhabi
- Indian Islahi Islamic School
- International Academic School, Abu Dhabi
- International Community School
- International School of Choueifat, Abu Dhabi
- Islamia English School
- Our Own English High School
- Pioneers International Private School
- PISCO Private School
- Philippine National School
- Reach British School
- Sheikh Khalifa Bin Zayed Arab Pakistani School
- Shaikh Khalifa Bin Zayed Bangladesh Islamia School
- Sherwood Academy
- St. Joseph's School
- Little Flower (P) School
- Umm Amar Secondary School
- Wisdom High School
- Sunrise English Private School
- Institute of Applied Technology (IAT)
- St Josephs High School Abu Dhabi
- Merryland International

=== Public schools ===
- Al Samha
- Al Taweelah
- Al Murjan
- Ibn Sina
- Al Falahiyya
- Halima Al Saadiah
- Al Dhabianiah
- Al Jazeera Club Academy Boys
- Al Bawadu
- Aishah Bint Abi Baker
- Al Asalah
- Bani Yas City School Girls
- Al Maha School Girls
- Al Rahbah Cycle 1
- Salamah Bint Butti Girls
- Yas School
- Al Reyada Girls
- Khalifa City
- Al Erteqaa
- Hamza Bin Abdul Muttalib Boys
- Darwish Bin Karam
- Al Zalaqah Girls
- Al Hosn Boys
- Al Fateh
- Al Waleed Bin Abdul Malek Boys
- Abdul Jalil Al Fahim Boys
- Al Wathbah Girls
- Al Shahama Girls
- Al Ezzah
- Al Ghazali
- Um Al Emarat
- Al Taawun
- Fatimah Bint Mubarak
- Abu Dhabi Boys
- Al Shawamekh Girls
- Al Q

=== Charter schools ===
- Al Qeyam School
- Al Riyadh School
- Al Azm School
- Al Majd School
- Abdulla bin Otaiba School
- Al Danah School
- Al Rayana School
- Al Nafya KG
- Al Walaa KG
- Al Ghadeer KG
- Al Narjes School
- Al Ghad School
- Al Budoor KG
- Al Mushrif KG
- Mubarak bin Mohammed School
- Al Salam School
- Al Watan School
- Al Jana'en School
- Jabel Hafeet School
- Al Qurm School

=== Colleges and universities ===
- Abu Dhabi University
- Al Khawarizmi International College
- Al Ain University of Science and Technology
- ALHOSN University
- Exeed School of Business and Finance
- European International College
- Higher Colleges of Technology
- INSEAD
- Khalifa University
- Masdar Institute of Science and Technology
- Mohamed bin Zayed University of Artificial Intelligence
- New York Institute of Technology
- New York University Abu Dhabi
- Petroleum Institute
- New York Film Academy
- Sorbonne University Abu Dhabi
- University of Strathclyde
- Zayed University
