= Delhi Private School =

Delphi Private School may refer to these schools run by the Indian Delhi Public School Society:

- Delhi Private School, Dubai, United Arab Emirates
- Delhi Private School, Sharjah, United Arab Emirates
