= Aysha Al Sayyar =

Aysha Ali Ahmed Al-Sayyar (born October 1948) is an Emirati educator and academic. She was the first woman from the United Arab Emirates to complete university studies and obtain a doctorate degree, which she received in 1983. In 2014, she was recognized by Sheikh Mohammed bin Rashid Al Maktoum and included in a list of 43 notable figures. She received the UAE Firsts Award in recognition of being the first Emirati woman to earn a doctorate degree.

== Professional life ==
Al-Sayyar completed her secondary education in Kuwait before enrolling at Ain Shams University in Egypt, where she earned her bachelor's degree in history in 1969 and her master's degree in 1973.

Upon completing her studies, she returned to the UAE and assumed management of the Rehabilitation Office at the Ministry of Education. She subsequently became head of the Social and Psychological Services Department at the University of Sharjah.

She later returned to Ain Shams University to pursue her doctoral studies, completing her PhD in 1982 with a dissertation titled "The Political Formation of the United Arab Emirates from 1892 to 1971."

Al-Sayyar was the first woman in the country to hold the position of Assistant Undersecretary at the Ministry of Education, serving from 1983 to 1998.

She was a member of UAE delegations to several international conferences, including the World Conference on Women in Mexico in 1975, where she presented a study on women's advancement in the country. She also participated in the Copenhagen Conference in 1980 and the Beijing Conference in 1995, as well as various conferences on social affairs and UNESCO
