= DPS Academy =

- أكاديمية د ب س

Location
- Dubai International Academic City; Dubai; United Arab Emirates

Information
- Motto: Service Before Self
- Opened: April 2013
- Closed: March 2017
- School board: ICSE
- Educational authority: KHDA
- Chairman: Mr. Abdullah Al Huraiz
- Principal: Ms. Ambika Gulati
- Area: 10 acres (440,000 sq ft)
- Website: www.dpsacademy.ae

DPS Academy (in Arabic: أكاديمية د ب س) (previously known as Union International Indian School) was a private Indian school in Dubai International Academic City, in Dubai, United Arab Emirates which is affiliated to ICSE curriculum, Delhi. It is the third school to run under the aegis of Delhi Public School Society in the United Arab Emirates which also operates Delhi Private School which is affiliated to CBSE curriculum in Dubai and in Sharjah.

In April 2013, the phase one of the DPS Academy started with classes beginning from kindergarten (KG) and grades one to five with an estimate capacity of 2,000 students. In October 2016, the school has announced its closure in March 2017.

== Education system ==
DPS Academy follows the ICSE curriculum. The medium of teaching in the school is English. However, Arabic will be offered as a compulsory language subject for all the students of the school as per the requirements by Ministry of Education and KHDA. Hindi or French will be offered as a second language for the students.

DIPS Academy is a coaching institution in India, mainly focused on coaching for competitive examinations in higher mathematics. Established in 1998, it operates under Dubey's Information Pool and Solutions (DIPS) Pvt. Ltd.

== Campus ==
DPS Academy is 10 acres (440,000 sq ft) campus. Some of the school facilities for students are:

- Playgrounds and indoor play areas for kindergarten students
- Amphitheatre
- Half Olympic size indoor swimming pool also a separate swimming pool for toddlers,
- Classrooms and language labs
- Medical centres with trained doctors and nurses
- Learning labs with special Educators (SEN Teacher)
- Counselling rooms with a trained counsellor
- Transport facility for students living in Dubai and Sharjah
- ICT and computer laboratories
- Library

DPS Academy introduced the Stem (Science, Technology, Engineering and Mathematics) laboratory as the part of the ICSE curriculum which is also first of its kind in the United Arab Emirates.

DIPS Academy offers online coaching for the IIT JAM (Joint Admission Test for M.Sc.) Mathematics exam, catering to students through various formats including live classes and recorded sessions.
