= Credence High School, Dubai =

Credence High School

Location
- Al Quoz, Dubai; United Arab Emirates; 25.1524°N 55.2490°E

Information
- Motto: We Laugh, We play, We teach, We learn
- Established: 2014
- Principal: Deepika Thapar Singh
- Chairman: Nalapad Ahmed Abdulla
- Staff: 164
- Grades: PreKindergarten to Grade 12
- Gender: Co-educational
- Campus size: 2.8 hectares
- Curriculum: CBSE
- Website: www.credencehighschool.com
- Last updated: June, 2024

Credence High School is a CBSE-affiliated co-educational Indian school in Dubai, United Arab Emirates. It was established in 2014 to provide education to the children of Indian expatriates and is located off Sheikh Zayed Road, in Al Quoz. The school is rated Very Good by Knowledge and Human Development Authority, the education regulating body of the UAE and hosts students of over thirty nationalities.

== Overview ==
Credence High School was founded in 2014 by a group of Indian expatriate businessmen, led by Azad Moopen, Nalapad Ahmed Abdulla and Sameer K. Mohamed to provide education mainly to Indian expatriate children. The school follows Central Board of Secondary Education (CBSE) curriculum. The staff strength of the school is 290 who host a student strength of 2500, comprising 30 nationalities. Deepika Thapar Singh serves as the principal of the school while it is chaired by Nalapad Ahmed Abdulla, one of the founders. Credence High School is a leading CBSE affiliated school in Dubai, offering education from Pre KG to Grade 12.

== Location ==
The school is located off Sheikh Zayed road in Al Quoz 4, Dubai.

== Facilities ==
The School complex is housed in a 25,700 square feet building on 2.8 hectares (7 acres) of land. It has a capacity to admit 3000 students and the facilities include a library, laboratories, dance and music hall, purpose-built indoor hall for sports and cultural activities, swimming pool, athletic track, courts for volleyball, basketball and cricket, and a football ground.

=== Extra-curricular activities ===
The school has a Student Council which governs student activities. The student council includes elected students for different sports, literary and cultural activities. It organizes UAE Quiz Masters Tournament, an annual inter-school quiz competition which attracts participants from various other schools in the UAE.

== KHDA inspection report ==
The Knowledge and Human Development Authority (KHDA) has rated the school Very Good for the year 2022–2023,2023-24,2024–2025 & 2025-2026 academic year.

Name of School	Curriculum	2015–16	2016–17	2017–18	2022–23	2023–24	2024–25	2025–26
Credence High School, Dubai	CBSE	New	Acceptable	Good	Very Good	Very Good	Very Good	Very Good

== See also ==
- Education in Dubai
- List of schools in the United Arab Emirates
- Education in the United Arab Emirates
