= Russian International School in Dubai =

- Muhaisnah; Dubai; UAE

Information
- School type: Independent School
- Founded: 1996
- Founder: Najibullah Najib
- Authority: KHDA
- Head teacher: Marina Khalikov
- Grades: KG1 - Grade 11
- Gender: Co-Educational
- Enrolment: 300
- Average class size: 20
- Education system: Russian Curriculum
- Language: Russian
- School fees: Dhs 14,000 - 22,000

The Russian International School in Dubai (Russian: Русская Международная Школа в Дубае; Arabic: المدرسة الدولیة الروسیة) is a Russian private school located in Muhaisnah 4, Dubai, United Arab Emirates. It follows the Russian Curriculum, the only school in Dubai to do so. Originally established in 1996 as the Dubai Russian School; it was a villa-based school with 60 students, founded by Najibullah Najib.

Since then, the school has relocated, with 450 students attending the school in 2013, supported by 41 teachers. During that year, in addition to newcomers from Dubai, some of the students came from other emirates, such as Ajman, Sharjah, and Umm Al Quwain.

== History ==
The Russian International School in Dubai was founded in 1996 by Najibullah Najib, under the name of Dubai Russian School. Originally, it was located in a villa in the Hamriya area of Dubai, and had 60 students.

In 2009, the school relocated to the Muhaisnah area, taking over a site that originally belonged to the European School of Dubai; closed by then.

In 2013, the school experienced an inflow of students, and in addition to the newcomers from Dubai, some of the students came from Ajman, Sharjah and Umm Al Quwain.

In 2016, the Russian International School in Dubai receives its first "Good" rating by the Knowledge and Human Development Authority.

== Campus ==
The Russian International School in Dubai is split into multiple 2 story buildings, designed in Arabic style. Notable campus facilities include a school library, an assembly hall and a sports hall, and a cafeteria.

== Curriculum ==
Russian International School in Dubai follows the Russian Curriculum, offering elementary, secondary and high school education, classes ranging from KG 1 to Grade 12 (known as Class 11 in Russia). The curriculum is aligned to Russian Education standards, and has been modified in order to incorporate the UAE Ministry of Education requirements, resulting in Arabic and Islamic education being added to the subject list.

KG - A KG specific curriculum has been developed, and helps to introduce children to the program

Elementary and Secondary school - students will study a generic set of subjects, including Arabic and Islamic Education. A UAE social studies has also been added as a subject.

High school - students will prepare for exams in the 10th and 12th grades, and then for the final Unified State Exam (USE), which tests the proficiency in the Russian language, mathematics, and the elective courses - the Russian form of the graduation exam.

== Rating ==
The Knowledge and Human Development Authority (KHDA) is an educational quality assurance authority based in Dubai, United Arab Emirates. It undertakes early learning, school and higher learning institution management and rates them, based on the performance of both the students and the teachers, with ratings ranging from Unsatisfactory to Outstanding.

Below is a summary of the inspection ratings for the Russian International School in Dubai.

2011-2012	2012-2013	2013-2014	2014-2015	2015-2016
Acceptable	Acceptable	Acceptable	Acceptable	Good
