= The Philippine School, Dubai =

The Philippine School – Dubai
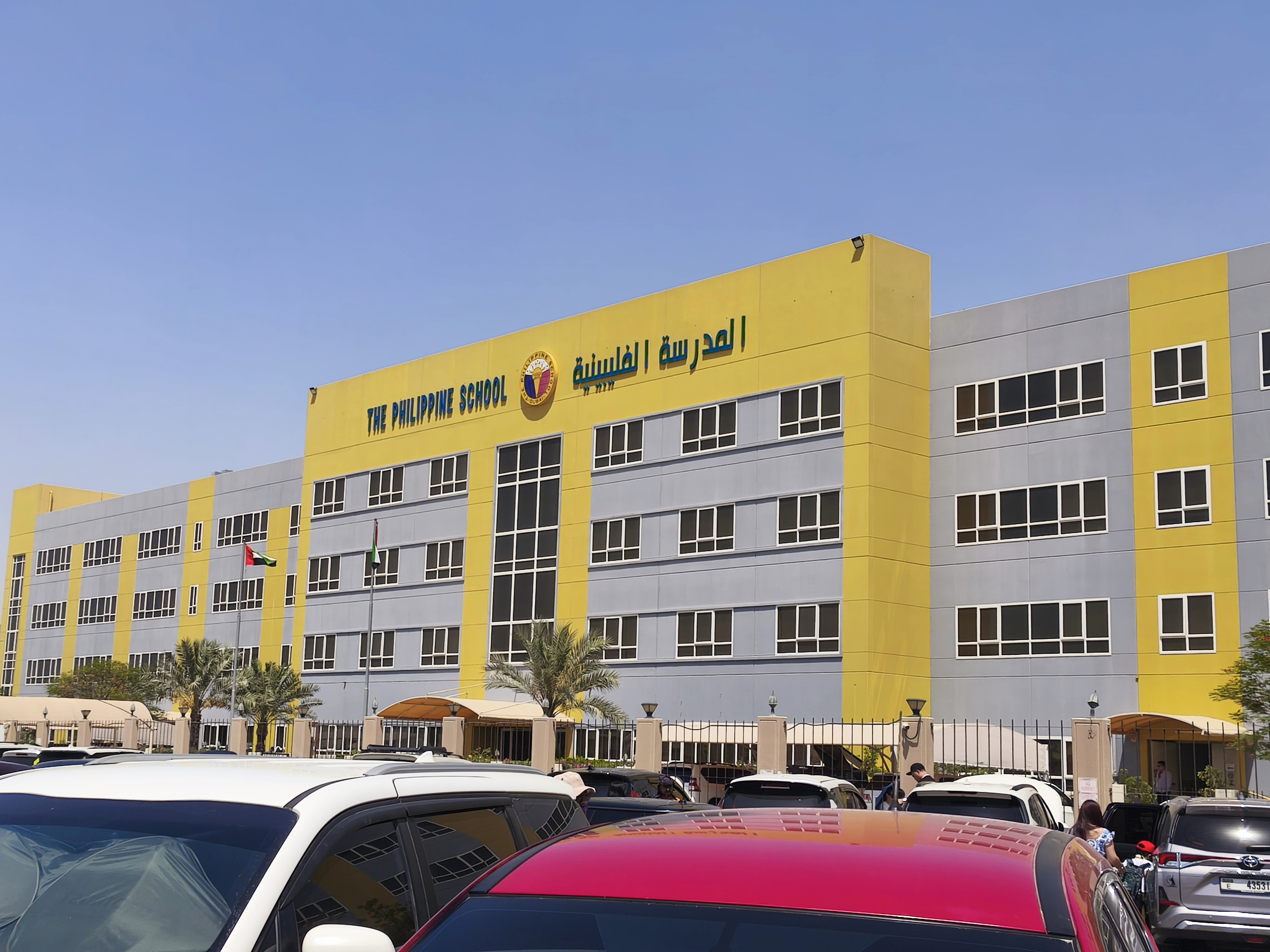
- Front of the School

Location
- 7th Street, Muhaisnah 2, Dubai, United Arab Emirates; United Arab Emirates

Information
- Type: Educational institution
- Established: 2008
- Chairman: Ali Mohammad A. H. Ali
- Director: Leticia Maniaul
- Principal: Dr. Rommel Pelayo
- Faculty: (estimated) 100–200
- Enrollment: (estimated) 2000–2800
- Education system: Filipino/Philippine
- Language: English, Filipino and Arabic
- DepEd report status: Accepted
- KHDA report status: Good
- Website: The Philippine School - Dubai

The Philippine School (Arabic: المدرسة الفلبينية) or known in abbreviation as TPS or TPSDXB, is a school in Dubai catering for Children of Filipino Expatriates (or also known as OFWs) living in the United Arab Emirates. Its students are addressed as TPSians. The Philippine School covers grade levels from kindergarten through the 12th grade. The Philippine School was established in February 2008 in Al Twar beside to Al Hesn Private School (defunct 2013) on the corner between 22nd Street and 205th Street and opened its first academic year on August 16 the following year. It was the second Philippine school in Dubai, after United International Private School (founded in 1992) and the 44th overseas. In 2010, it relocated to Al Rashidiya and then in Academic Year 2016–2017, It moved to its current campus in Al Muhaisnah 2. Students of TPS often participate in academic competitions, contests and inter-school activities.

The school's 2019–2020 inspection report by the Dubai School Inspection Bureau of the Knowledge and Human Development Authority was summarized as "acceptable".

The school is inspected by the Dubai School Inspection Bureau. According to its student handbook, The Philippine School provides academic instruction through experiential, integrative, multicultural, and values-oriented learning.

The Philippine School, Dubai is accredited and authorized by the Department of Education (DepEd) under the following licenses

Phase 1 - Government Recognition No. 001, Series 2017

Phase 2 - Government Recognition No. 001, Series 2017

Phase 3 - Government Recognition No. 001, Series 2017

Phase 4 - SHS Permit No. 19, S. 2016

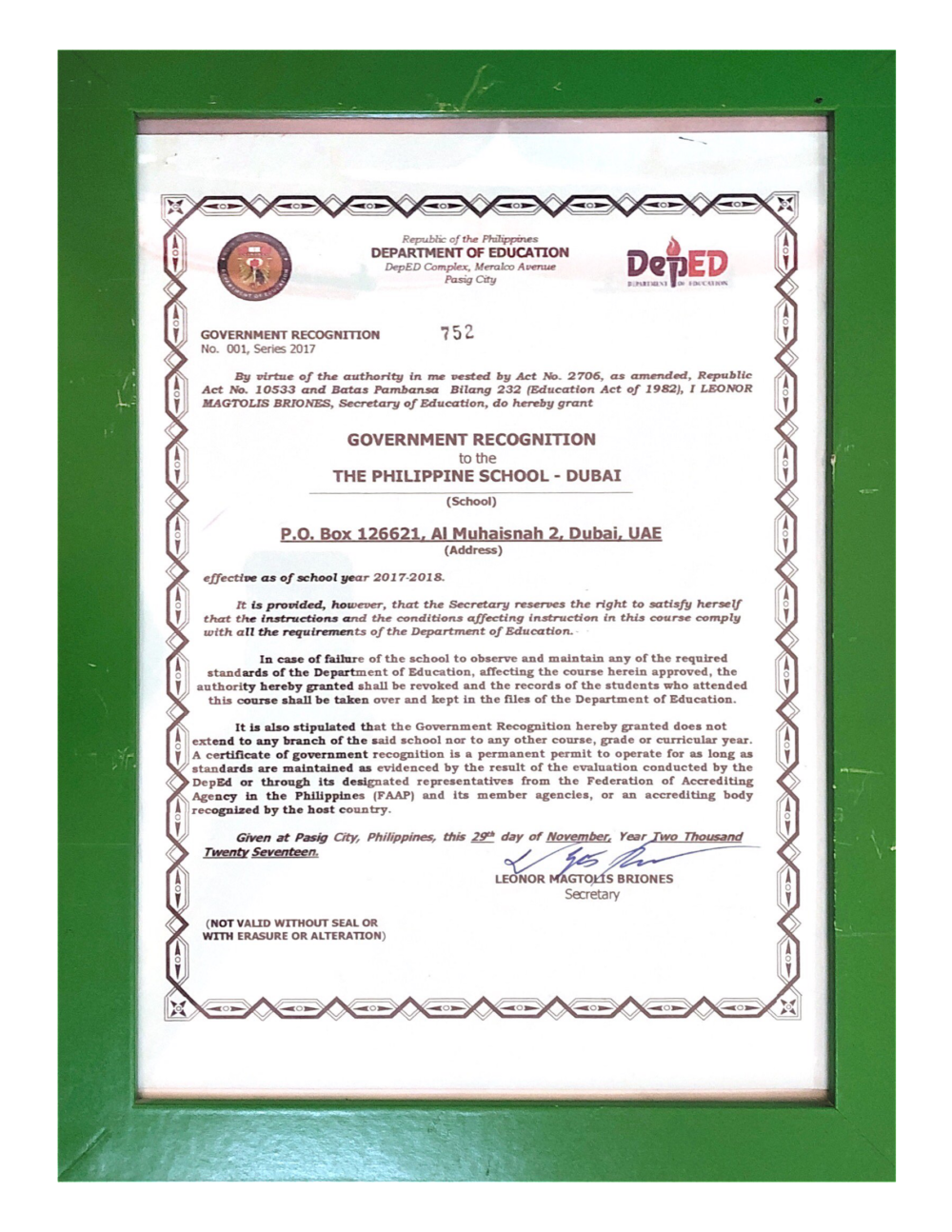
The Philippine School, Dubai, Government Recognition No. 001, Series 2017

== Curriculum ==
The Philippine School offers Filipino curriculum subjects and UAE curriculum to comply with KHDA and DepEd standards. The TPS has attuned its curriculum to that in the Philippines so that the students have an easier transition on the occasion they need to return home. The following are the subjects that the school offers.

- English
- Filipino
- Science
- Mathematics
- ICT (Information and Communications Technology)
- MAPEH (Music, Arts, Physical Education and Health)
- HELE (For Elementary only, Home Economics and Livelihood Education)
- TLE (For High School only, Technology and Livelihood Education)
- AP (Araling Panlipunan)
- Makabansa
- EsP (Edukasyon sa Pagkakatao)
- GMRC (Good Manners and Right Conduct)
- MSCS (Moral, Social and Cultural Studies)
- Islamic Education (only for Muslim students as an alternative to EsP)

For Senior High School (Phase 4), there are completely different subjects instead of the aforementioned subjects above. The school offers interest clubs to support the core subjects that the school is offering.

== School Facilities and Services ==
The Philippine School offers a variety of facilities that the students can use. All facilities are listed below.

- TLE Lab
- ICT Lab
- Canteen (Closed, Converted into a storage room.)
- Covered Court
- Playground
- Music Room
- Arts Room
- Science Laboratory
- Resource Room
- Guidance Office
- School Clinic

== Transportation ==
The Philippine School is accessible by the Dubai Bus offered by the Road and Transportation Authority.

Route	Terminus A	Terminus B	Service
F05	Al Rashidiya Bus Station	Mizhar 1	Every 10-15 Minutes

The school is accessible by private vehicles, Dubai Bus, taxis or small vehicles. Ordering food from Delivery Courier Companies (e.g., Talabat, Noon, Deliveroo, and Keeta) to the campus is not permitted but is exempt during special occasions.
