= Dubai Scholars Private School =

Coordinates: 25.2805°N 55.3647°E

- Al Qusais; Dubai; United Arab Emirates

Information
- School type: Independent school
- Established: 1976
- Founder: Madhu Verma
- Status: open
- Sister school: Scholars International Academy
- Authority: KHDA
- Principal: Sapna Changrani
- Gender: Co-Educational
- Enrolment: 2100
- Education system: National Curriculum of England
- Language: English
- Mascot: Falcon
- Website: dubaischolars.com

Dubai Scholars Private School, is a private school, located in Al Qusais, Dubai, UAE. The school is managed by the Scholars International Group, and offers the National Curriculum of England to students ranging from FS1 to Year 13.

== History ==
Founded in 1976 by Madhu Verma, Dubai Scholars Private School was a villa-based school, located in the Deira area of Dubai. Eventually, the school relocated to two villas, later expanding to seven.

In 1994, the school relocated to the Al Qusais area of Dubai, where the campus is now located.

== Campus ==
Located in the Al Qusais area, the Dubai Scholars Private School campus is split into zones - Early years, Primary and Secondary. The campus contains several libraries, with the outdoor facilities including a pool, a sports field and several playgrounds.

== Curriculum ==
Dubai Scholars Private School follows the National Curriculum of England, offering courses for students ranging from FS 1 to Year 13.

During the foundation programme and primary school years (FS 1-Year 6), students will study a defined set of subjects in order to prepare them for the secondary school. As per UAE's Ministry of Education requirements, all of the students will also study Arabic, and the Muslim students will also take Islamic studies.

During Years 7 and 8 (Key Stage 3), students will keep studying a general set of subjects, preparing for the IGCSE programme.

During Years 9, 10 and 11 (Key Stage 4), students will take part in the IGCSE programme, choosing a set of 10 subjects to study, and taking official exams on those subjects at the end of Year 11.

During Years 12 and 13 (Key Stage 5), students will take part in the A levels programme, which consists of both the AS and A2 level qualifications.

== KHDA Inspection Report ==
The Knowledge and Human Development Authority (KHDA) is an educational quality assurance authority based in Dubai, United Arab Emirates. It undertakes early learning, school and higher learning institution management and rates them, based on the performance of both the teachers and the students.

Below is a summary of the inspection ratings for Dubai Scholars Private School.

School name	2015-2016	2014-2015	2013-2014	2012-2013	2011-2012	2010-2011	Curriculum
Dubai Scholars Private School	Good	Good	Good	Good	Good	Good	UK
