= Sharjah English School =

Sharjah English School (SES)
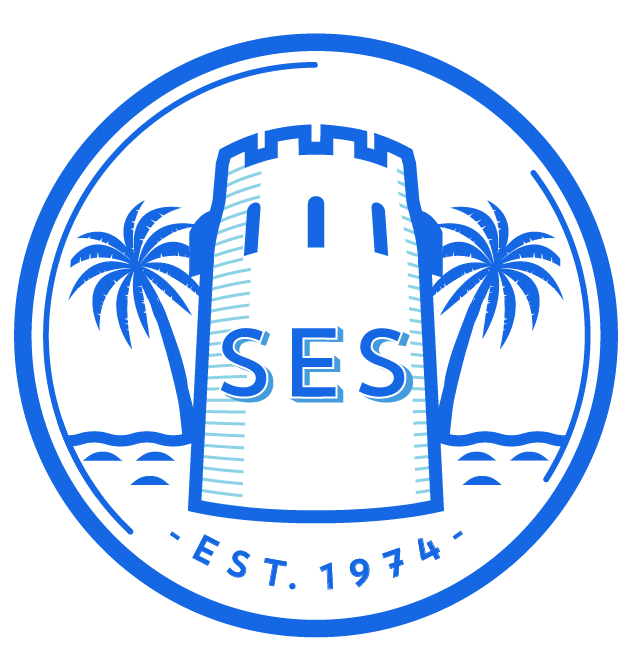
- SES Logo

Location
- Maleha Road, Sharjah; Sharjah University City; Sharjah; United Arab Emirates

Information
- Funding type: Private: Not-for-profit
- Established: 1974
- Founder: Sultan bin Muhammad Al-Qasimi
- Oversight: Sharjah Private Education Authority (SPEA)
- Chairperson: Khalid Al Amiri
- Principal: Darren Coulson
- Grades: K-Year 13
- Gender: Co-ed
- Sixth form students: 65
- Average class size: approx. 24
- Sports: Rugby Union; Football; Cricket; Netball; Volleyball; Basketball
- School fees: AED 26,400 - 67,600
- Website: http://www.sharjahenglishschool.org
- The flagship SES campus at Sharjah University City

Sharjah English School (SES) is a British-curriculum school in Sharjah, United Arab Emirates (UAE). It is one of the oldest private, not for profit, coeducational schools in the UAE. It currently has an enrollment of 850 students across primary and secondary (ages 3–18).

The student cohort are English-speaking expatriate children, with UK citizens being the largest national group. Outside of Arabic and Islamic Studies departments, all teaching staff are UK qualified.

SES has been inspected recently in March 2019. It emerged as "an outstanding school", described as being "very effective" with high standards across all areas. Students undertake British GCSE and A-Level qualifications with many alumni continuing their higher education abroad.

SES has been included among the top British schools in the UAE by The Telegraph among the likes of Repton School Dubai and Jumeirah College, and has been described as being one of the top choices for British expats in Sharjah, while Khaleej Times acknowledged the school as "one of the leading educational institutions in the Emirates". It has been credited by Which School Advisor are enjoying unusually high levels of parental approval. A sizeable minority of parents are also part of the school teaching staff.

The school is under the auspices of the Sharjah Private Education Authority (SPEA) and is accredited to British Schools Overseas (BSO) and British Schools of the Middle East (BSME).

== History ==
A group of British companies wishing to provide educational services to their employees' children opened the school in 1974 in downtown Sharjah. SES remained a primary school only until 2005, when the secondary school opened on a large, new site on Meliha Road, near University City. The first GCSE cohort sat for exams in 2008, and the first A-Level class graduated in 2010.

A new secondary block was added in 2011, and a new foundation and infants building was opened in October 2017. September 2019 sees the first three-form cohort start Year 7 in Secondary; the primary school is now three-form intake throughout.

== Admissions ==
The senior library at SES

Admission to Sharjah English School is competitive and early applications are essential. The school is non-selective academically, but fluency in English is expected. Admission for students requiring Learning Support is dependent on the school's ability to provide the necessary staffing and support, in the context of other demands on the LS staff at any one time.

Priority is mainly given to UK nationals and families of the school's supporting companies and institutions (Petrofac, American University of Sharjah, Higher Colleges of Technology, etc.).

== Campus ==
Upper sixth (grade 13) common room

The school's campus next to Sharjah University City houses a range of facilities. In 2018 a new studio for art and drama was constructed. There is a large sports hall and an outdoor swimming pool.

Facilities also include music rooms, and a range of specialist classrooms such as science labs and Design and Technology workshops.

The primary school consists of two specialist buildings, a separate sports hall, and outdoor play areas.

== Primary education ==
The primary school, which was established in 1974 and now includes three form intake from Foundation to Year 6, currently has just over 500 pupils. These follow the EYFS and UK National Curriculum. The EYFS curriculum has been described as "outstanding" (BSO 2019). Over 90% of pupils transition from Primary to SES Secondary.
