= Dubai International Academy =

Location
- Dubai; United Arab Emirates; 25°4′40″N 55°10′44″E

Information
- Other name: DIA
- Type: Private
- Motto: Dream, Inspire, Achieve
- Established: September 10, 2005
- Status: Open
- Sister school: Dubai International Academy, Al Barsha
- Authority: KHDA
- Principal: Hitesh Bhagat
- Grades: KG1 – Year 13
- Gender: Co-educational
- Enrolment: 2000+
- Education system: International Baccalaureate
- Colors: Red, Green and Black
- Tuition: AED 43,946 – 77,866
- Website: www.diadubai.com

Dubai International Academy (DIA) is an international private school located in the Emirates Hills area of Dubai, United Arab Emirates. The school is operated by the Innoventures Education group and offers the complete International Baccalaureate (IB) continuum, serving students from KG1 through Year 13.

== History ==
Dubai International Academy was founded in 2005 with an inaugural cohort of 500 students from 55 nationalities. By 2012, it had grown to 1,800 students from 78 nationalities, supported by a faculty of 250 staff. The school became the first in the UAE to offer the full IB continuum: the Primary Years Programme (PYP), Middle Years Programme (MYP), Diploma Programme (DP), and Career-related Programme (CP).

A second campus, Dubai International Academy – Al Barsha, opened in 2018 to meet growing demand.

== Curriculum ==
DIA offers the full IB continuum:

- Primary Years Programme (PYP)
- Middle Years Programme (MYP)
- Diploma Programme (DP)
- Career-related Programme (CP)

English, mathematics, and science are compulsory throughout all levels. Language acquisition options include French, Spanish, and self-taught languages in the Diploma Programme.

The school supports mother-tongue language instruction as an alternative to Islamic Studies for non-Muslim students. Languages include Danish, Dutch, Finnish, French, German, Hindi, Italian, Spanish, Swedish, and Mandarin.

== Extracurricular Activities ==
=== Model United Nations ===
DIA hosts the annual Dubai International Academy Model United Nations (DIAMUN), affiliated with THIMUN. The conference is considered one of the largest in the region and was the first to adopt a fully paperless format.

=== Politics@DIA ===
Politics@DIA is a student-led club promoting civic awareness and hosts debates, panel discussions, and guest speaker sessions.

=== Water for Life ===
This club partners with organizations like UNICEF to raise awareness and fund water infrastructure in developing countries.

=== Sustainability Initiatives ===
DIA was named a top 3 finalist for the World's Best School Prize for Environmental Action 2024.

=== Duke of Edinburgh International Award ===
DIA offers the Bronze, Silver, and Gold levels of the Duke of Edinburgh’s Award, with students participating in local and international expeditions.

=== Sports ===
The school supports competitive teams in football, basketball, swimming, netball, and more under the name "DIA Wolves", with participation across U12, U14, U16, and U18 categories.

== KHDA Rating ==
The Knowledge and Human Development Authority (KHDA) evaluates schools annually. DIA received its first "Outstanding" rating in 2015 and has consistently retained this status in subsequent years.

== See also ==
- Education in the United Arab Emirates
- List of universities and colleges in the United Arab Emirates
