= GEMS World Academy (Dubai) =

Coordinates: 25.08223°N 55.21952°E

GEMS World Academy – Dubai
- Al Barsha South; Dubai; United Arab Emirates

Information
- School type: Private international school
- Established: 2007
- Status: Open
- Authority: KHDA
- Head of school: Mr. Heath Monk
- Grades: Pre-K–Grade 12
- Gender: Co-educational
- Enrollment: 2,500
- Education system: International Baccalaureate
- Language: English
- Website: gemsworldacademy-dubai.com

GEMS World Academy – Dubai is a private international school located in Al Barsha South, Dubai, United Arab Emirates. Operated by GEMS Education, the school opened in 2008 and delivers all four programmes of the International Baccalaureate (IB) from Pre-Kindergarten to Grade 12. As of 2026, it operates 45 schools in the UAE with 146,000 students.

== History ==
The academy was established in 2007 and launched in 2008 as part of GEMS Education's expansion in premium international schooling. It earned phased IB authorization as follows:

- 2010 – PYP and DP
- 2011 – MYP
- 2017 – CP

By 2019, the school employed 184 teachers representing 27 countries. In 2022, its students achieved an average IB Diploma score of 34.2, with 95% gaining admission to their first-choice universities.

== Campus ==
Situated on a 50,125 m² site, the school has both academic and athletic facilities.

Educational facilities include a library and research center, planetarium and science labs, 604-seat auditorium and symphony center, language institute, innovation hubs and educational gardens. For athletics, the school has a 400-meter athletics track and artificial pitch, Olympic-size and training pools, tennis courts, squash courts, a climbing wall, junior and senior gymnasiums, and a fitness center.

== Curriculum ==
GEMS World Academy delivers the complete IB continuum:

Programme	Grades	Description
PYP	Pre-K–5	Emphasizes inquiry-based learning across core subjects
MYP	6–10	Focuses on interdisciplinary teaching, critical thinking
DP	11–12	College-prep programme with six subject groups and core components
CP	11–12	Combines academic and vocational elements

== IB Diploma Subject Groups ==
The academy has a range of courses across IB groups:

- Group 1: English Language and Literature, Literature
- Group 2: French, Arabic, Spanish, English B
- Group 3: History, Economics, Global Politics, Psychology
- Group 4: Biology, Chemistry, Physics, Design Technology, Nature of Science
- Group 5: Mathematics AA, Mathematics AI, HL, SL, Studies
- Group 6: Visual Arts, Theatre, Music

== Co-curricular activities ==
A Week Without Walls is a mandatory programme where students engage in international service trips or local sustainability projects. It contributes toward CAS (Creativity, Activity, Service) and MYP’s Service as Action outcomes.

The school has various team and individual sports.

== Inspection and ratings ==
The KHDA evaluates private schools in Dubai. GEMS World Academy's KHDA performance rating improved after ratings began in 2008:

Year	Rating
2008–09	Acceptable
2009–17	Good
2017–19	Very Good

== See also ==
- Education in Dubai
- GEMS Education
- International Baccalaureate Organization
