= Humaid Al Shamsi =

Emirati oncologist and academic

- حميد الشامسي
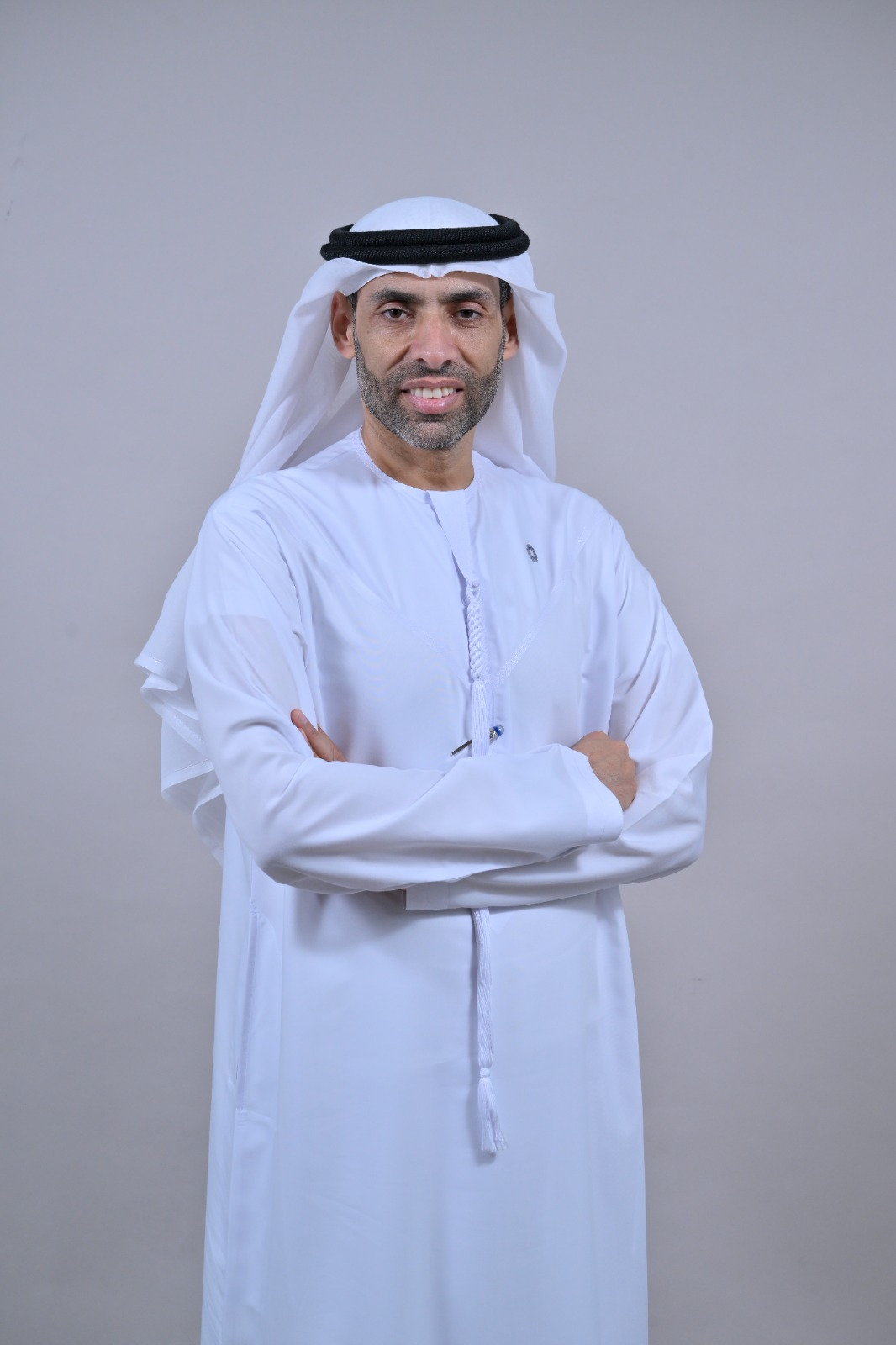
- Born: Humaid Obaid bin Harmal Al Shamsi; United Arab Emirates
- Education: University College Cork (MB BCh BAO); McMaster University (Residency, Fellowship)
- Known for: Cancer care, oncology research, health policy in the Gulf region
- Scientific career
- Fields: Oncology Alma Mater = University college cork , McMaster University
- Workplaces: Burjeel Cancer Institute; University of Sharjah; McMaster University; MD Anderson Cancer Center

Humaid Obaid bin Harmal Al Shamsi is an Emirati academic, professor and physician specializing in oncology, known for his roles in cancer care, research, and health policy in the United Arab Emirates (UAE) and the wider Gulf region.

== Education ==
Humaid Al Shamsi enrolled at The National University of Ireland- University College Cork in Ireland, where he obtained a Bachelor of Medical Sciences and a Bachelor of Medicine and Surgery with honours. He pursued postgraduate training in internal medicine and oncology in Canada, the United Kingdom, and the United States. He completed residency and fellowship training at McMaster University and subsequently undertook a subspecialty fellowship in gastrointestinal oncology and palliative care.

== Career ==
Al Shamsi has held clinical, academic, and administrative positions in oncology across several countries. He worked as a consultant oncologist and assistant professor at Juravinski Cancer Center at McMaster University in Canada and assistant professor at the University of Texas MD Anderson Cancer Center in the United States between 2014 and 2017. After returning to the United Arab Emirates, he held leadership clinical roles at hospitals including Al Zahra Hospital. He later became CEO of Burjeel cancer institute at Burjeel Holdings and has been associated with the development of oncology programs in the UAE. He led the establishment of one of the UAE’s first comprehensive bone marrow transplant (BMT) programs for both adult and pediatric patients, significantly enhancing national capacity for complex treatments.

In academia, he joined University of Sharjah, where he was appointed associate professor and later promoted to professor. He has held leadership roles in professional organizations, including serving as president of the Emirates Oncology Society. He has also served as rapporteur of the Gulf Oncology Society and chaired regional committees on colorectal cancer within international oncology networks. His clinical and research interests include colorectal cancer, breast cancer, lung cancer, and gastrointestinal malignancies, as well as cancer epidemiology and healthcare systems in the Gulf region.

He is currently a visiting professor at Harvard Medical School at Harvard University and visiting scientist at Dana Farber Cancer Institute Harvard University. He was recognised as the first Emirati and GCC physician appointed as a visiting professor at Harvard.

== Selected publications ==
- Cancer in the Arab World (2021), a book addressing cancer epidemiology and care in the region
- Contributions to Textbook of Uncommon Cancer (2017)
- Chapters in works on healthcare systems in the Middle East (2019)
- “A Practical Approach to the Management of Cancer Patients During the COVID-19 Pandemic” (2020)
- “Screening for COVID-19 in Asymptomatic Patients With Cancer in a Hospital in the United Arab Emirates” (2020)
