= Mohammad Al-Shboul =

- Born: Jordan
- Occupation: Economist
- Years active: 2008 - present
- Known for: Contributions to the fields of banking stability, and systemic risk

Academic background
- Education: University of Al-Qadisiyah, James Cook University

Academic work
- Discipline: Economics
- Institutions: University of Sharjah
- Main interests: Banking stability, systemic risk, Islamic banking, financial market behavior, corporate finance, and risk management

Mohammad Al-Shboul is a Jordanian academic, researcher, author, and professor of finance and banking at the University of Sharjah in the United Arab Emirates.

He is known for his contributions to the fields of banking stability, systemic risk, Islamic banking, financial market behavior, corporate finance, and risk management, particularly within emerging markets and Gulf Cooperation Council (GCC) economies.

== Early life and education ==
Mohammad Al-Shboul completed his undergraduate studies in economics at Al-Qadisiyah University. Following his early academic training, he pursued higher education in Australia, where he obtained a master's degree in finance from the University of Technology Sydney.

He later earned a Ph.D. in finance and banking from James Cook University in Australia.

== Career ==
Al-Shboul began his academic career at Al-Hussein Bin Talal University in Jordan, where he served as a faculty member from 2008 until 2014. During this period, he taught courses related to finance, banking, investment analysis, and corporate finance while participating in academic research and university activities.

In 2014, he joined the University of Sharjah in the United Arab Emirates as an associate professor of finance and banking. At the University of Sharjah, he has been involved in undergraduate and postgraduate teaching, research supervision, curriculum development, and academic service within the College of Business Administration.

== Research and contributions ==
Al-Shboul's research examines investor sentiment, stock market efficiency, dividend policy, commodity markets, and volatility spillovers across international financial systems. His studies often utilize advanced empirical methods such as panel-data analysis, Value-at-Risk (VaR) and CoVaR models, wavelet coherence analysis, and spillover index methodologies to evaluate financial market dynamics and risk transmission.

In later years, his research expanded into cryptocurrencies and financial technology. He published studies on cryptocurrency uncertainty, connectedness among digital assets, and the safe-haven properties of gold-backed cryptocurrencies during periods of financial stress. Several of his works also investigated the effects of the COVID-19 pandemic and the Russian–Ukrainian conflict on banking systems, financial markets, tourism behavior, and cryptocurrency efficiency.

== Selected publications ==
- “Oil Structural Shocks, Bank-Level Characteristics, and Systemic Risk: Evidence from Dual Banking Systems” (Economic Systems)
- “Dividend policy, its asymmetric behavior and stock liquidity” (Journal of Economic Studies)
- “Political Risk and Bank Stability in the Middle East and North Africa Region” (Pacific-Basin Finance Journal)
- “Pricing of the Currency Risk in the Canadian Equity Market” (Research in International Business and Finance)
- “Cryptocurrency Uncertainty and Dynamic Spillovers” (International Review of Financial Analysis)
- “Are Latin American Stock Markets Connected? Exploring Spillovers and the Impact of Risk Factors” (Emerging Markets Review)
