= Muhaisnah =

Muhaisnah محيصنة
- Community
- Interactive map of Muhaisnah
- Coordinates: 25.24640°N 55.41847°E
- Country: United Arab Emirates
- Emirate: Dubai
- City: Dubai
- Boroughs: List: Muhaisnah 1; Muhaisnah 2; Muhaisnah 3; Muhaisnah 4

Area
  - Total: 13 km^{2} (5.0 sq mi)

Population (2016)
  - Total: 234,117
  - Density: 18,000/km^{2} (47,000/sq mi)

Muhaisnah (Arabic: محيصنة) is a locality in Dubai, United Arab Emirates situated in eastern Dubai in Deira.

== Neighborhoods ==
Muhaisnah comprises four sub-communities:

- Muhaisnah 1
- Muhaisnah 2
- Muhaisnah 3
- Muhaisnah 4

Muhaisnah 1 and Muhaisnah 2 are bounded to the west by route E 311 (Sheikh Mohammed Bin Zayed Road) and to the east by route D 56, while Muhaisnah 3 and Muhaisnah 4 are bounded to the west by D 62 (Al Rashidiya Road) and to the east by E 311. Muhaisnah is bordered by Al Qusais to the west, Al Twar to the west and southwest, Al Mizhar to the east and Mirdif to the south. With over 235,000 residents, Muhaisnah is the most populous community in Dubai.

Muhaisnah 2, 3 and 4 comprise an area that was once a burial ground. These sub-localities now house several collective labour accommodations and labour camps for the mainly South Asian labourers that service the industrial areas of Al Qusais, as well as construction workers who mainly support real estate projects south of Dubai Creek. This area is referred to as Sonapur (literally, Land of Gold in Urdu/Hindi) by expatriate labourers. In 2006, living conditions in the collective labour camps were criticised by Human Rights Watch as being "less than human". As a result of the criticism, the Dubai government closed down 100 labour camps that failed to meet basic standards set by the Dubai Municipality.

In the past couple of years, Muhaisnah has had a number of new residential projects being constructed, mainly due to the Expo 2020 construction boom in Dubai.

== Climate ==
Climate data for Muhaisnah
Month	Jan	Feb	Mar	Apr	May	Jun	Jul	Aug	Sep	Oct	Nov	Dec	Year
Record high °C (°F)	26.8 (80.2)	30.6 (87.1)	34.2 (93.6)	36.7 (98.1)	38.8 (101.8)	40.6 (105.1)	43.7 (110.7)	46 (115)	41 (106)	37.6 (99.7)	33 (91)	28 (82)	46 (115)
Mean daily maximum °C (°F)	18.2 (64.8)	21.3 (70.3)	25.8 (78.4)	28 (82)	34.2 (93.6)	36.4 (97.5)	38.5 (101.3)	39.7 (103.5)	35.8 (96.4)	32 (90)	26.2 (79.2)	21 (70)	32.7 (90.9)
Daily mean °C (°F)	14.5 (58.1)	16.5 (61.7)	19.6 (67.3)	21.8 (71.2)	26.3 (79.3)	28.3 (82.9)	31.2 (88.2)	33 (91)	30.4 (86.7)	26.8 (80.2)	21.3 (70.3)	17 (63)	23.9 (75.0)
Mean daily minimum °C (°F)	10.8 (51.4)	11.7 (53.1)	13.5 (56.3)	15.6 (60.1)	18.4 (65.1)	20.3 (68.5)	24 (75)	26 (79)	25 (77)	21.6 (70.9)	16.4 (61.5)	13 (55)	21.6 (70.9)
Record low °C (°F)	−2 (28)	2 (36)	6 (43)	8.3 (46.9)	12.7 (54.9)	15 (59)	16.5 (61.7)	17 (63)	15 (59)	12.8 (55.0)	6 (43)	1 (34)	−2 (28)
Average precipitation mm (inches)	35 (1.4)	42 (1.7)	45 (1.8)	20 (0.8)	4 (0.2)	1 (0.0)	3 (0.1)	1 (0.0)	3 (0.1)	6 (0.2)	25 (1.0)	15 (0.6)	200 (7.9)
Average precipitation days	9	7	13	6	2	0.7	1.6	1	1.5	3	5	5	54.8
Average relative humidity (%)	65	65	63	55	53	58	56	57	60	60	61	64	60
Mean monthly sunshine hours	254.2	229.6	254.2	294.0	344.1	342.0	322.4	316.2	309.0	303.8	285.0	254.2	3,508.7
Percentage possible sunshine	70	68	58	70	85	81	74	78	86	80	78	70	75
Source 1: Dubai Meteorological Office
Source 2: climatebase.ru (extremes, sun), NOAA (humidity, 1974–1991)

== Facilities ==
=== Shopping ===
- Madina Mall
- Lulu Village

=== Medical Centers ===
There are several medical centers:

- Aster Medical Clinic
- DocIB

== Education ==
Schools in the area include:

- Islamic School for Training and Education
- St. Mary's High School Muhaisnah, Dubai
- Buds Public School
- Russian International School in Dubai
- Oxford School Dubai
- Indian Academy Dubai
- Philadelphia Private School (PPS), Dubai
- United International Private School, Dubai
- Greenwood International School
- The Philippine School, Dubai
- Gulf Model School
