= Dubai National School, Al Twar =

- Dubai; United Arab Emirates

Information
- School type: Independent school
- Established: 2000
- Status: Open
- Authority: KHDA
- Principal: Mr. Malik
- Gender: Both
- Education system: US Curriculum
- Website: http://www.dns.sch.ae/twar.html

Dubai National School, Al Twar is an American School located in Al Twar, Dubai, UAE. It is a private profit-making school. It has presently 1800 students enrolled.

== KHDA Inspection Report ==
The Knowledge and Human Development Authority (KHDA) is an educational quality assurance authority based in Dubai, United Arab Emirates. It undertakes early learning, school and higher learning institution management and rates them as well.

A summary of the inspection ratings for Dubai National School, Al Twar.

School name	2010-2011	2009-2010	2008-2009	Curriculum
Dubai National School, Al Twar	good	good	good	US

A summary of all the schools in Dubai's ratings can be found at KHDA School Ratings.
