= Arab Unity School =

Private school in Al Mizhar Dubai, UAE

Location
- Al Mizhar 1 Dubai; UAE; 25°14′11″N 55°25′48″E

Information
- Type: Private International school
- Established: 1974
- Director: Arwa Taher
- Principal: Kelvin Hornsby
- Gender: Boys and Girls (Different sections, only after Year 4 till Year 11)
- Language: English
- Website: arabunityschool.ae

Arab Unity School is a school in Dubai, United Arab Emirates.

== History ==
The school has about 3000+ students from FS 2 to Year 13, to the IGCSE curriculum and for A levels. The founder and director was Zainab Taher, who died in Mumbai on Monday, 2 May 2022. Arab Unity was founded in 1974.

In 2002, it became the first school to in the Middle East to obtain 'Fellowship Centre' status from Cambridge International Examinations.

The school is a pioneer in the introduction of ICT skills tests into the school curriculum.

== KHDA inspection report ==
The Knowledge and Human Development Authority (KHDA), an educational quality assurance authority in Dubai, has published the following the inspection ratings for Arab Unity School.

School name	2010-2011	2009-2010	2008-2009	Curriculum
Arab Unity School	Acceptable	Acceptable	Unsatisfactory	UK

The 2009 rating of "Unsatisfactory" was an all-time low for the school.In 2010, 2011, 2012, and 2013 the school received the rating of "Acceptable".

== Sports ==
Arab Unity specializes in cricket, basketball, and football. In 2006, the school won the under-18 Pepsi inter-school cricket championship. Student Adil Khalil won the cricket 'Best All-rounder' award at under-15 inter-school level for 2008–09. Arab Unity School also won the inter-school cricket championship in 2015.
