= Dubai National School, Al Barsha =

- Dubai; United Arab Emirates

Information
- School type: Independent school
- Established: 1987
- Status: Open
- Authority: KHDA
- Head of school: Ms Suad Abu-Harb
- Gender: Both, segregated classes after 3rd grade
- Education system: US Curriculum: Common Core; Next Generation Science Standards
- Website: dnsalbarsha.com

Dubai National School, Al Barsha is an American School located in Barsha, Dubai, UAE. It is a private profit-making school, with classes segregated by gender from 4th grade. The school currently has approximately 2,700 students.

Dubai National School, Al Barsha is one of two branches of Dubai National School, the other being located in Al Twar. The school teaches children of all ages, from pre-kindergarten to 12th grade, and follows an American curriculum. Most of the children at the school have an Emirati background.
