= Buds Public School, Dubai =

Buds Public School

Location
- Muhaisnah Dubai; UAE
- Coordinates: 25°14′25″N 55°24′26″E

Information
- Type: Private
- Motto: Arise. Aspire. Achieve.
- Established: 1987
- Director: M. Durairaj
- Grades: KG to Grade 12
- Gender: Co-educational
- Website: www.bpsdubai.ae

Buds Public School is K-12 school located in Dubai which follows a Central Board of Secondary Education, New Delhi curriculum. The school was established in 1987. A 2013 report by Dubai's Knowledge and Human Development Authority (KHDA) stated that it had an "acceptable" rating.
