= GEMS Modern Academy =

Private school in Dubai

Location
- Nad Al Sheba; Dubai; United Arab Emirates; 25.1546°N 55.37531°E

Information
- School type: Private Independent school
- Established: 18 October 1986
- Founder: Sunny Varkey
- Status: Open
- Authority: KHDA
- Principal: Sydney Michael Atkins
- Years offered: Pre KG - Grade 12
- Gender: Co-educational
- Enrollment: 3800
- Education system: CICSE and International Baccalaureate
- Campus: Gems Modern Academy
- Campus type: Urban
- Houses: Aquila, Cygnus, Orion, Pegasus
- Colour
- Athletics: Yes
- Sports: Yes
- School fees: 30,272 - 72,180 AED
- Website: www.gemsmodernacademy-dubai.com

GEMS Modern Academy (Arabic: جيمس مودرن أكاديمي), formerly known as Dubai Modern High School, is a private school situated in the Nad Al Sheba area of Dubai in the United Arab Emirates. The school is part of the GEMS group of schools, an international school business.

== History ==
GEMS Modern Academy was founded as Dubai Modern High School on 18 October 1986. In 2011, former United States President Bill Clinton visited the school as the chief guest during its 25th Anniversary celebration, as part of his wider initiative to increase access to education for children. The same year, the school came under scrutiny after an incident where a four-year-old girl was allegedly raped by a bus driver and two other members of staff, leading to the postponing of annual events run by the school. Although all suspects initially confessed to the crime, they were later acquitted.

In 2014, the school embarked on an expedition to Antarctica with pupils in Grade 12. The trip was led and inspired by British explorer Robert Swan after he gave a motivational talk at the school encouraging younger generations to preserve Antarctica. In 2023, the school launched a cricket academy in partnership with JMR Sporting, offering specialised coaching for students aged 6 to 18 years.

== Sports ==
GEMS Modern Academy has an established cricket team, with it winning the ILT20 Schools Cup in 2024, defeating The Winchester School by six wickets.

== Academics ==
The school offers CICSE and International Baccalaureate curricula, the former only being offered from grades 6 to 12. The school implements the Primary Years Programme (PYP), Middle Years Programme (MYP), the Diploma Programme and the Career Related Programme for students in the IB curriculum. In 2024, the school received a 100% pass rate for their CICSE and ISC Board Exams for Grades 10 and 12. The school has been ranked Outstanding by the Knowledge and Human Development Authority since the 2011–12 school year, the highest rating possible.

== Musical productions ==
GEMS Modern Academy has had several musical productions by Kevin Oliver, a playwright and fashion choreographer known for his Fashion weeks in Dubai, London, Toronto, Moscow and more.

== Notable alumni ==
- Aadit Palicha - Co-founder of Zepto
