= Exeed College =

Emirati higher education institution

Coordinates: 25.30350°N 55.36712°E

- Type: Private business school
- Established: 2016
- Affiliations: Chartered Management Institute, Universidad Católica San Antonio de Murcia, Plymouth Marjon University,
- Dean: Dr. Vivek Mohan
- Director: Mr. Samras Mayimi
- Faculty: 147
- Location: Colorado Springs, United States of America
- Campus: Urban
- Website: www.exeedcollege.com

Exeed College is a business school and Higher Education institution based out of Colorado, USA. The college was founded in 2016. Exeed College has operations in the US, Europe, MENA and Asia.

== Courses ==
Exeed College offers programmes, including executive leadership, teacher training, and technical courses.

== Awards and recognitions ==
- Exeed College won an award at the MEA HR & Learning Awards 2022 for their outstanding achievements in HR and learning strategies.
- In 2022, Exeed College won the Outstanding Organization Award at the Education 2.0 Conference.

== Events ==
Exeed College conducts a graduation ceremony for its graduates every year in Dubai. The event honours students who have successfully completed MBA and teacher education programs.

== See also ==
- List of universities and colleges in the United Arab Emirates
- University City of Sharjah
