= Al Nahda National Schools =

- Abu Dhabi; United Arab Emirates

Information
- Type: Private School
- Established: 1983
- Principal: Salma Eid (girls), Ahlam Abou Radi (boys)
- Grades: KG 1 – Grade 12
- Gender: Separate campuses for both genders
- Language: English, Arabic, French and Urdu
- Nickname: ANS

Al Nahda National Schools is a private school in Abu Dhabi, United Arab Emirates founded in 1983 by local businessman and entrepreneur Saeed Al-Junaibi.

It provides education in both the British and American curriculums. The school is divided into 3 campuses: a boys' campus (for boys in 4th grade and above), a girls' campus (for girls in 7th grade and above), and an elementary campus (for all children below 3rd grade, and girls up to 6th grade).

== Admission ==
Admissions are open to all nationalities. Students up to 4th grade attend the Girls' elementary school building. Girls in grades 4 to 12 will continue to attend the secondary Girls' School while boys go to the Boys' school building.

== Uniform ==
Al Nahda National Schools is a private English language school in Abu Dhabi, United Arab Emirates."'] It is divided into a boys' school?! and a girls' school. 3] Students at the boys' school are often mistaken for ADNOC petrol pump workers due to the blue colour of their school uniform. The school was founded in 1983 by Mr. Salah Montherharakat.(4]

== History ==
=== Founding ===
The school was founded in 1983 by Saeed Al-Junaibi and is one of the oldest schools in the United Arab Emirates.

=== Notable visitors ===
The school has been visited by multiple noteworthy persons, including:

- Boxer Muhammad Ali, in 1986.
- Astronaut Michael López-Alegría, in 2018.

== Accreditation ==
The school is accredited by the following International Schools and Colleges:

- Council of International Schools
- European Council of International Schools
- New England Association of Schools and Colleges
- Cambridge International Examinations
- Edexcel
- SAT
- TOEFL
- Associated Schools Project Network

== Curriculum ==
The school gives students the option to choose between the American and British curriculums and conducts the following examinations:

- SAT I and II
- International General Certificate of Secondary Education (Cambridge International Examinations)
- GCE Advanced Level (Edexcel and Cambridge International Examinations)
- TOEFL
- IELTS
