= University City of Sharjah =

University City of Sharjah المدينة الجامعية بالشارقة
- Education District
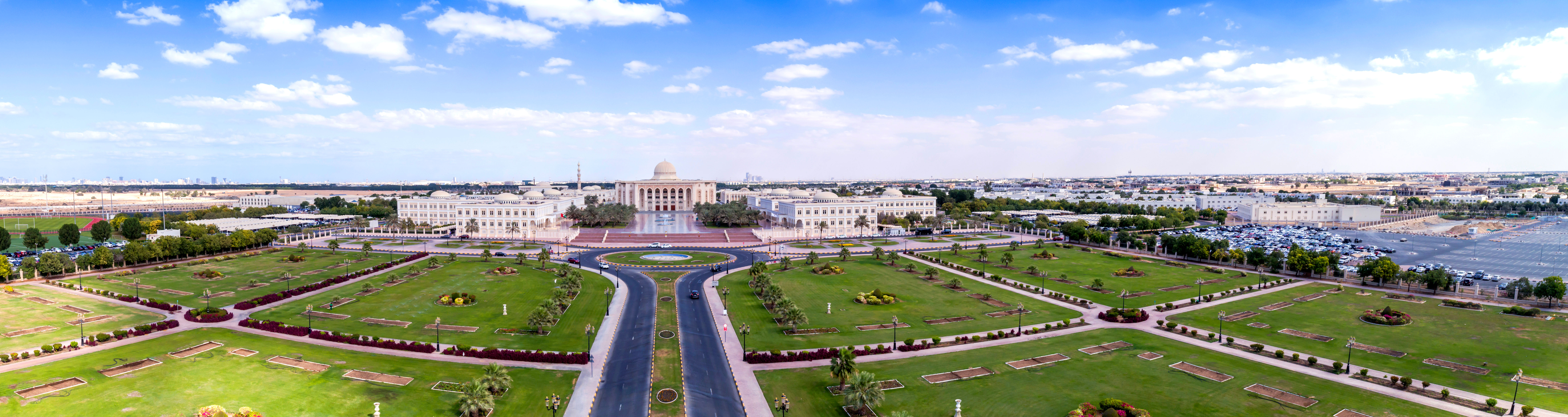
- American University of Sharjah in University City of Sharjah
- Interactive map of University City of Sharjah
- Coordinates: 25.2992033°N 55.4784292°E
- Country: United Arab Emirates
- Emirate: Sharjah
- City: Sharjah
- Website: universitycity.gov.ae/en/

Sharjah University City is an education district in Sharjah, United Arab Emirates close to the Sharjah International Airport. It contains the American University of Sharjah, the Higher Colleges of Technology alongside its men and women campuses and the University of Sharjah alongside its medical and fine arts campuses. The area includes the Sharjah Police Academy, University Hospital of Sharjah, University Dental Hospital of Sharjah and the Sharjah Library.

== List of universities & institutions in the University City ==
- American University of Sharjah
- Higher Colleges of Technology
- Sharjah Institute of Technology
- Sharjah Police Academy
- Skyline University
- University Hospital of Sharjah
- University Dental Hospital of Sharjah
- University of Sharjah
- Al Qasimia University
- Exeed School of Business and Finance

== See also ==
- Dubai Knowledge Village
