= Clarion School =

School in Dubai, United Arab Emirates

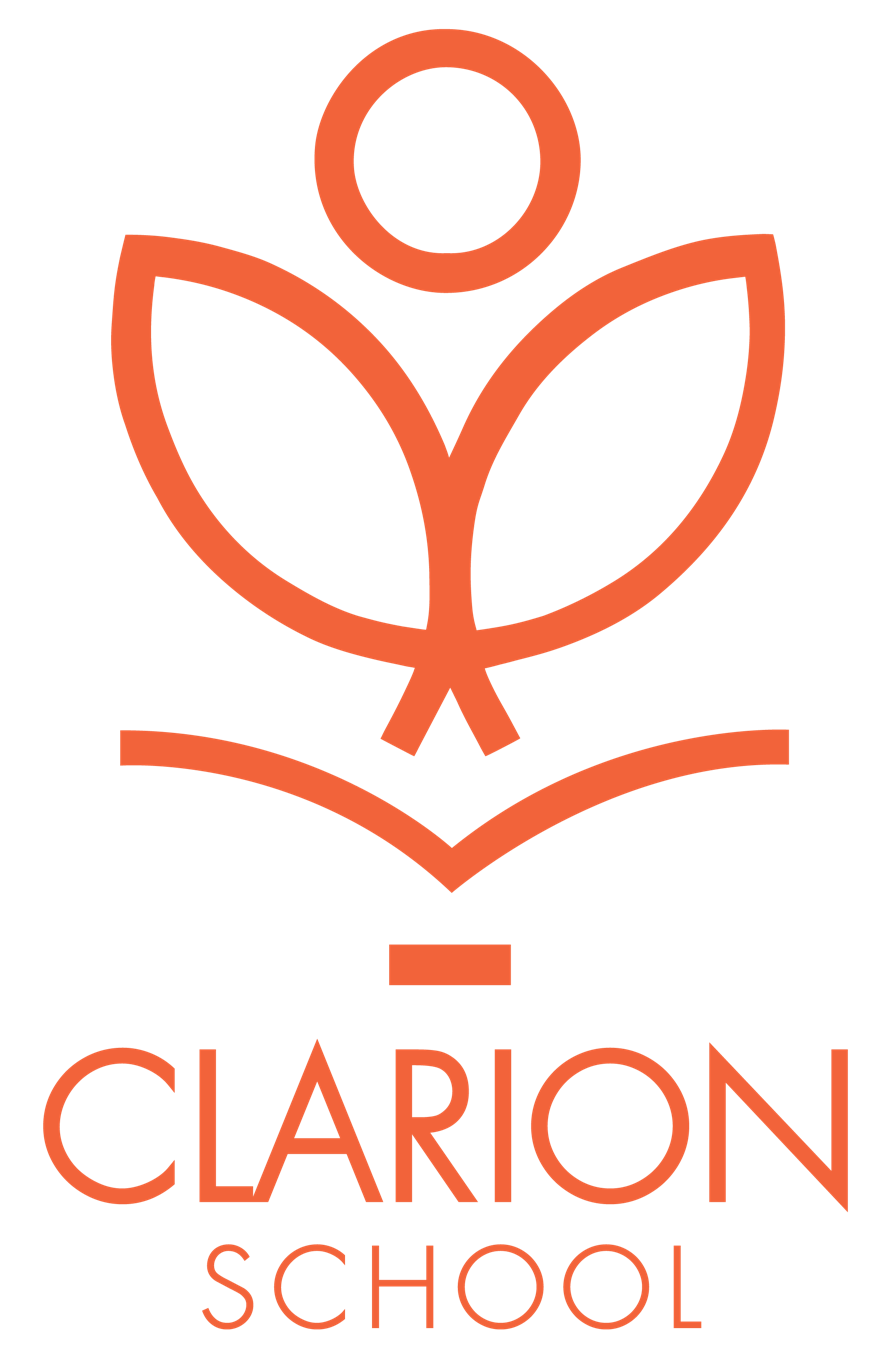

Location
- D - 13 Al Asayel St; Dubai; United Arab Emirates

Information
- Opened: September 2016; 9 years ago
- Principal: Lisa Ripperger
- Website: clarionschool.com

Clarion School is an American school located in Dubai, United Arab Emirates. It is owned and operated by the Scholars International Group (SIG).

== Curriculum ==
The curriculum of Clarion School was developed using the Bank Street Developmental Interaction Approach framework by Virginia Casper and a team of Bank Street Educators in collaboration with SIG. It was refined by Paul Lieblich, Executive Principal of Scholars International Group.

Clarion School's is aligned with the Common Core Standards. In grades 11 and 12, students are given the option to pursue an International Baccalaureate Diploma.

In addition to focusing on STEAM fields, Clarion School requires students to participate in community service in order to graduate.
