= Greenwood International School =

- مدرسة جرين وود الدولية

Location
- Schools Complex, Muhaisnah 1, Diera, Near Dubai Women Medical College. Dubai, 79595; United Arab Emirates
- Coordinates: 25.2442°N 55.4181°E

Information
- School type: Private
- Motto: Linking Learning to Life
- Established: 2006
- Founder: Mr. Nasser Badri and Ms. Rashida Badri
- Status: Open
- Authority: KHDA
- Principal: Ms. Lina Zarif
- Years offered: KG 1 to Grade 12
- Gender: Both - Segregated
- Age: 4 to 18
- Student to teacher ratio: 1:17
- Education system: American curriculum
- Houses: Maple / Fir / Cedar / Oak
- Colour: Green
- Accreditation: NEASC
- National ranking: Good
- Tuition: Average: 20,000 to 30,000 Dhs
- Website: www.greenwood.sch.ae

Greenwood International School is an American curriculum school based in the United Arab Emirates, Dubai. The school was founded in 2006 by Mr. Nasser Badri and Ms. Rashida Badri.
