= Delhi Private School, Dubai =

- مدرسة دلهي الخاصة، دبي

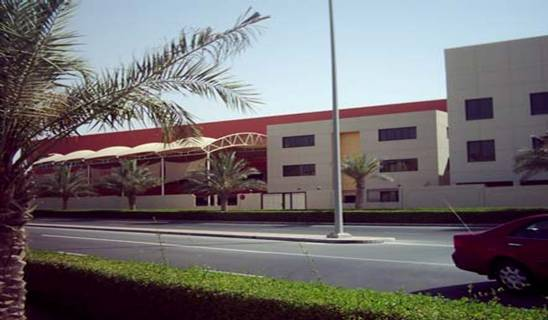

Location
- Dubai; United Arab Emirates; 25°02′20.1″N 55°07′19.9″E

Information
- Other name: DPS Dubai, DPSD
- Type: Private school
- Motto: "Service Before Self"
- Established: 2003
- Sister school: Delhi Private School, Sharjah; Delhi Private School, Ras Al Khaimah; Delhi Private School, Ajman
- Chairman: Mohammed Jovino Abadallah Jojji
- Principal: Rashmi Nandkeolyar
- Faculty: 298
- Years offered: KG1 – Grade 12
- Gender: Co-educational
- Age range: 4–17
- Enrollment: 3,840
- Education system: CBSE
- Area: The Gardens, Jebel Ali
- Colour: White Green
- School fees: AED 10,800 – 15,200 per annum
- Affiliation: Central Board of Secondary Education
- Website: website.dpsdubai.com
- Last updated: November 2024

Delhi Private School, Dubai (DPS Dubai; مدرسة دلهي الخاصة، دبي) is a private, co-educational day school located in Jebel Ali, Dubai, United Arab Emirates. The school offers the CBSE curriculum and primarily serves the Indian expatriate community. Established in 2003, it provides education from Kindergarten (KG1) to Grade 12.

== Overview ==
Initially established under the aegis of the Delhi Public School Society (DPS Society), the school was part of a global network of DPS institutions. In May 2018, the DPS Society formally ended its association with the school. DPS Dubai has since operated independently while continuing to follow the CBSE curriculum.

== History ==
Delhi Private School, Dubai, opened in 2003, initially offering co-education up to Grade 4. By 2014, the school transitioned to a fully co-educational model across all grade levels. The institution has grown significantly in both enrollment and facilities since its inception.

The school is led by Principal Rashmi Nandkeolyar, who has played a pivotal role in shaping its academic and extracurricular profile.

== Campus and facilities ==
Located in The Gardens, a residential area in southern Dubai, the campus features:

- Purpose-built academic blocks
- Science, mathematics, and computer laboratories
- Libraries and digital resource centers
- Multipurpose sports courts, a football ground, and a swimming pool
- Auditoriums and dedicated performance spaces
- Cafeteria and on-campus medical facilities

The school also emphasizes sustainability, integrating eco-friendly practices into its operations and curriculum.

== Academics ==
DPS Dubai follows the CBSE curriculum prescribed by the National Council of Educational Research and Training (NCERT), India. At the senior secondary level, students can opt for Science, Commerce, or Humanities streams.

The school consistently records strong academic results in CBSE Grade 10 and Grade 12 board examinations. A significant number of graduates pursue higher education in reputed universities both in India and abroad.

== Regulatory evaluation ==
Delhi Private School, Dubai, is regulated by the Knowledge and Human Development Authority (KHDA), which oversees private education in Dubai. As per the most recent KHDA inspection, the school received a rating of "Very Good" for the academic year 2023–24.

== Sister schools ==
DPS Dubai is affiliated with two sister institutions within the United Arab Emirates:

- Delhi Private School, Sharjah – established in 2000
- Delhi Private School, Ras Al Khaimah – opened in April 2021

These schools operate independently but share similar pedagogical approaches and values.

== See also ==
- Delhi Private School, Sharjah
- The Winchester School, Jebel Ali
- List of schools in the United Arab Emirates
- Education in Dubai
