= Delhi Private School, Sharjah =

- مدرسة دلهي الخاصة، الشارقة

Location
- Industrial Area 16, Muwaileh Commercial; Sharjah; United Arab Emirates
- Coordinates: 25°17′36″N 55°27′7″E

Information
- Other name: DPS Sharjah
- Type: Private school
- Motto: Service Before Self
- Established: January 2000
- Founder: Abha Sehgal
- School board: Central Board of Secondary Education
- Principal: Vandana Marwaha
- Staff: 500+
- Grades: KG1 to Grade 12
- Age range: 3–18
- Enrolment: 5,700+
- Language: English
- Campus size: 12 acres
- Houses: Amazon; Danube; Indus; Nile
- Colours: White and Green
- Affiliation: Eco-Schools
- Website: www.dpssharjah.com

Delhi Private School, Sharjah (DPS Sharjah, مدرسة دلهي الخاصة، الشارقة) is a private school in Sharjah, United Arab Emirates, affiliated with the Central Board of Secondary Education (CBSE) in India. It offers classes from KG1 to Grade 12, and operates on a 12-acre campus in Industrial Area 16, Muwaileh Commercial. As of 2024, the school has over 5,700 students and approximately 500 staff members.

The school was the first in the UAE to operate under the Delhi Public School brand and is currently rated "Very Good" by the Sharjah Private Education Authority (SPEA).

== History ==
Delhi Private School, Sharjah was established in January 2000 by founding principal Abha Sehgal. It was initially affiliated with the Delhi Public School Society and was later joined by Delhi Private School, Dubai in 2002.

=== Affiliation to the Delhi Public School Society ===
From its founding until 2017, DPS Sharjah operated under franchise from the Delhi Public School Society. In 2017, the agreement expired and was not renewed due to fee hikes. The DPS Group managing DPS Sharjah and DPS Dubai opted to continue independently under their registered trademark, citing a desire to avoid burdening families.

==== Legal dispute with DPS Ajman ====
In March 2019, V. K. Shunglu, chairman of the Delhi Public School Society, stated that no school should use the DPS name without the society's consent. Dinesh Kothari, managing director of DPS Sharjah and Dubai, responded that "Delhi Private School LLC is a registered trademark under which we are operating for the last 19 years." The group won a lower court ruling in Ajman preventing DPS Ajman from using the name. In November 2019, the higher court upheld the ruling, ordering DPS Ajman to change its name. The case was then escalated to the Federal Supreme Court of the United Arab Emirates.

== Educational system and co-curricular activities ==
DPS Sharjah follows the CBSE curriculum. It offers academics from KG1 to Grade 12, including Science and Commerce streams in the senior secondary level.

In 2005, the school introduced the Comprehensive Learning Program - CLP (Now being slowly replaced by the SPECIAL PROGRAMS portal), an online portal that provides monthly assignments, study materials, and academic updates to students and parents. Students in Grades 6–8 undergo Periodic Tests and Summative Assessments, while students in Grades 10 and 12 prepare for CBSE Pre-Board and Board examinations. Students are also provided with Elective Subjects (1 Per Student, On A First-Come-Serve Basis), Ranging from Sports, Languages, Technology and Other Miscellaneous Genres, which can be changed every academic year.

The school also runs the ACE (Awareness, Community, Environment) program promoting community service and social responsibility.

== Awards ==
In 2015, the school received the "Sharjah Environment Awareness Award for Educational and Institutional Performance" for the academic year 2013–14 from the Ministry of Education and Sharjah Education Zone.

On 5 May 2014, the school was awarded the Green Flag by the Emirates Wildlife Society (EWS-WWF) in collaboration with the World Wide Fund for Nature (WWF) for its eco-conscious initiatives.

After receiving the Green Schools award in 2014, DPS Sharjah has won it again in 2026.
