= ALHOSN University =

Private university in Abu Dhabi (2005–2021)

Coordinates: 24.46012°N 54.37700°E

- Motto: Global Knowledge with Local Vision
- Type: Private
- Established: 2005
- Vice-Chancellor: Dr. Mohamad Kashef
- Location: Abu Dhabi, United Arab Emirates

ALHOSN University was an educational institution founded in 2005 and located in Abu Dhabi, the capital city of the United Arab Emirates. It is a segregated University with separate campuses for Male and Female Students. The Abu Dhabi–based university was accredited by the UAE Ministry of Higher Education and Scientific Research.

ALHOSN University offered 18 undergraduate and 11 postgraduate degrees under three faculties, Business, Engineering and Arts and Social Science. The university offered programs in the fields of Engineering (Accreditation Board for Engineering and Technology, (ABET) accredited) Business (Association of Certified Chartered Accountants (ACCA) accredited) and Education. Undergraduate academic degrees are offered as four-year programs and taught in English, all except for the Arabic education component. ALHOSN University is a member of the Arab Association of Universities.

The university's City Campus was located in Abu Dhabi and has students from 41 nationalities and Faculty and Staff from 33 countries.

In 2017, Ministry of Education in UAE have placed the university on probation and closed the university in 2021.

== Web-based services ==
The university uses the Moodle system for e-learning.
