= Al Mizhar =

Al Mizhar المزهر
- Community
- Interactive map of Al Mizhar
- Coordinates: 25.24493°N 55.44199°E
- Country: United Arab Emirates
- Emirate: Dubai
- City: Dubai
- Boroughs: List: Al Mizhar 1; Al Mizhar 2; Al Mizhar 3; Al Mizhar 4

Area
  - Total: 11.2 km^{2} (4.3 sq mi)

Population (2000)
  - Total: 4,326
  - Density: 386/km^{2} (1,000/sq mi)

Al Mizhar (Arabic: المزهر) is a locality in Dubai, United Arab Emirates. Al Mizhar, literally meaning The Blossom, is one of the southeasternmost localities of Dubai. It is bordered to the south by Mirdif and to the west by Muhaisnah. Al Mizhar is bounded to the north by route D 93 (Al Tunis Road) and to the south by D 89 (Al Khawaneej Road). Al Mizhar is divided into four subcommunities: Al Mizhar 1, Al Mizhar 2, Al Mizhar 3 and Al Mizhar 4.
