= Education in the United Arab Emirates =

Provision of education in the United Arab Emirates began shortly after the establishment of the federation with the inception of the first university, the United Arab Emirates University, located in Al Ain, Abu Dhabi. Since then, the country has progressed with efforts to ensure high literacy rates, modern programs and women's share in education. It works on improving its youth's education which is why the agenda 2021 has been set. The UAE currently devotes approximately 16 percent of total federal government spending to education. In 2019, the overall literacy rate was 96%, and in the year 2022, the literacy rate increased to 98.29.

== Basic education ==
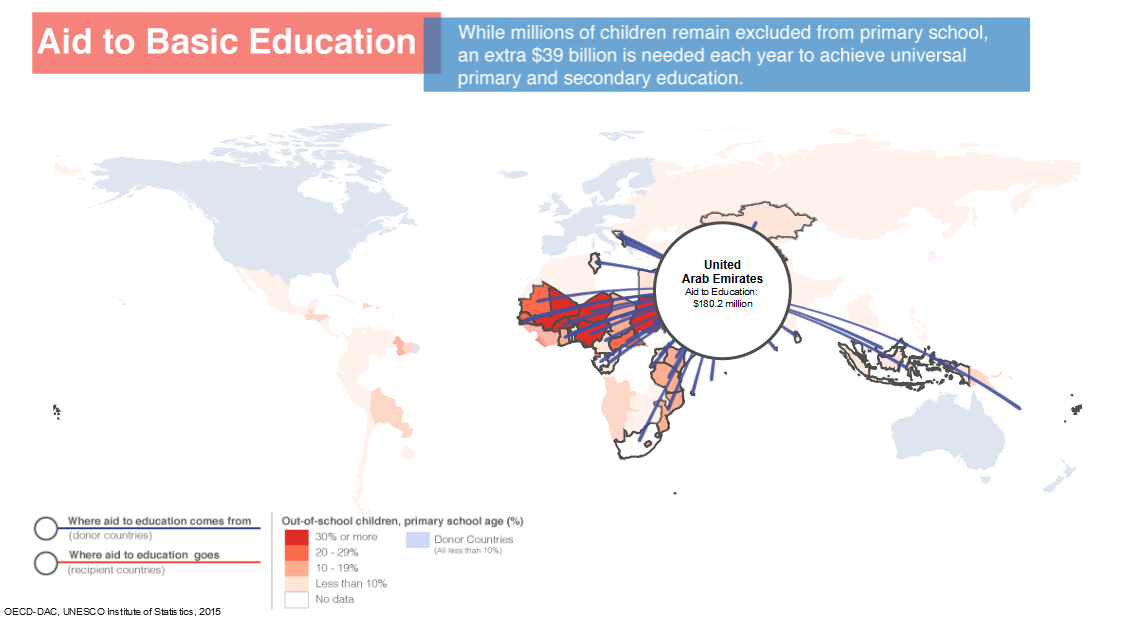
Aid to Basic Education, the amount of bilateral and multilateral aid contributed or received by United Arab Emirates

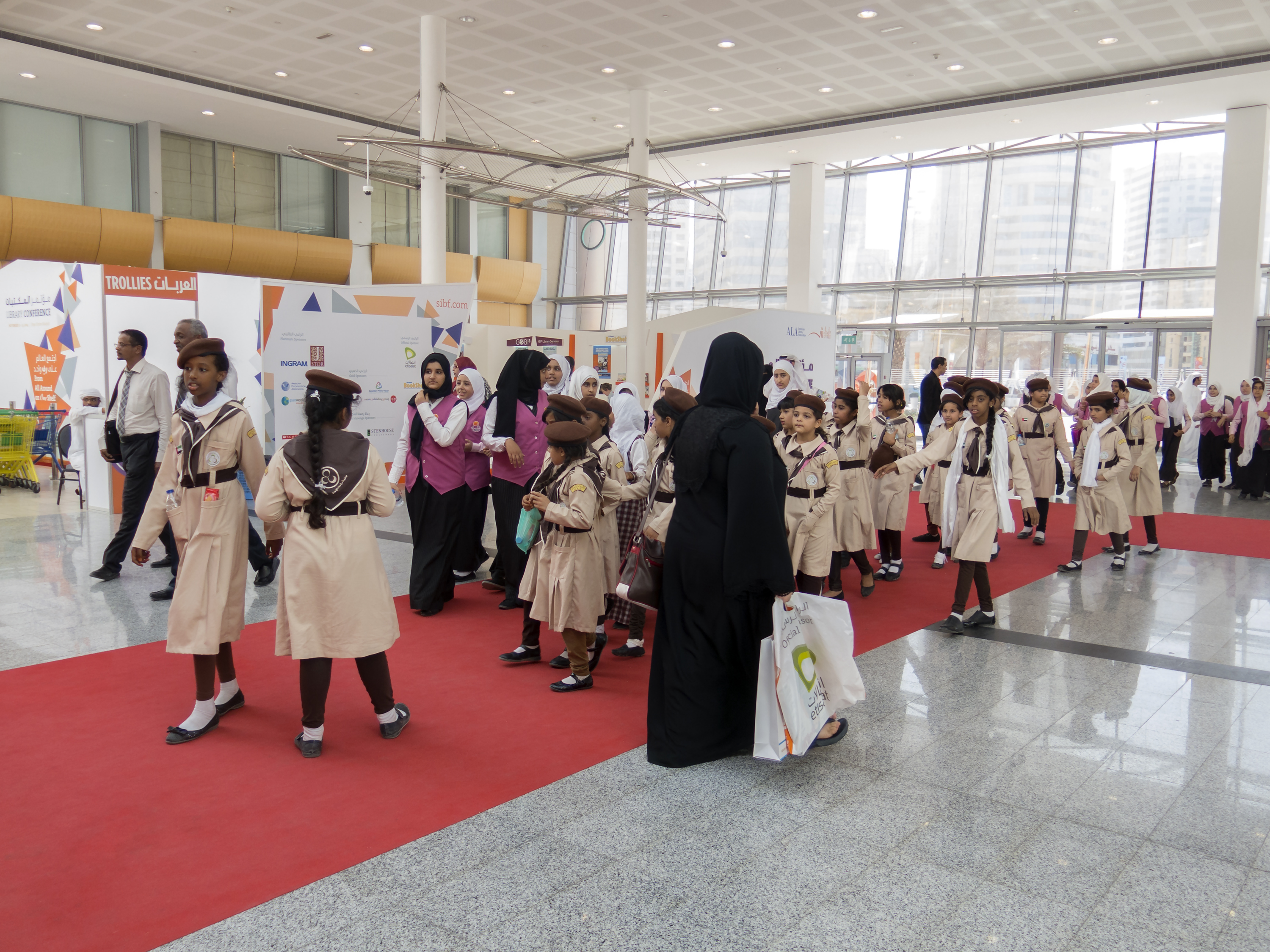
Schoolchildren at the Sharjah International Book Fair in Sharjah, UAE

As of 2019, the UAE is rated at 0.802 on the United Nations Education Index. The Index is "one of the three indices on which the Human Development Index is built." It is based on the adult literacy rate and the combined gross enrollment ratio for primary, secondary, and tertiary schools. Regionally, the UAE is the highest-scoring nation, with Saudi Arabia at 0.78, the Palestine at 0.678, Lebanon at 0.604, Kuwait at 0.638, and Jordan at 0.667. Internationally, the country with the highest rating was the United Kingdom with 0.948, while Niger stood lowest at 0.249.

The UAE has also made regionally significant achievements in ensuring women's access to education. UNDP's Millennium Development Goal No. 3, to "Promote Gender Equality and Empower Women," has reached its targeted levels of female participation in primary education and continues to increase. (See Women in the United Arab Emirates).

== Development program ==
The Ministry of Education has adopted "Education 2021", a series of three-year plans designed to introduce advanced education techniques, improve innovative skills, and focus more on the self-learning abilities of students. As part of this program, an enhanced curriculum for mathematics and integrated science was introduced at the first-grade level for the 2003–4 academic year in all government schools.

The UAE education system is divided into four tiers:

- Kindergarten: KG 1 and KG 2 – 4–5 years old
- Primary School: Grade 1–5 – 6–10 years old
- Preparatory Stage: Grade 6–8 – 11–14 years old
- Secondary School: Grade 9-12 – 14-18 years old

The UAE has sought to implement and monitor high quality education standards by implementing new policies, programs and initiatives. Throughout the Middle East, educational advancement is often impeded by insufficient focus on the English language, inadequate provision of technology as well as modern techniques of instruction and methodology. Stressing the importance of "modern curricula with assorted and non-monotonous means of training and evaluation", the Emirates launched campaigns to develop each of these areas. At its foundation, lies the necessary funding, which in 2009 was earmarked at 7.4 billion dirhams ($2 billion), as well as increased teacher training. Through its Teachers of the 21st Century and a two hundred million dirham share of this budget, the UAE hopes to train 10,000 public school teachers within the next five years, while also pursuing its scheduled goal of reaching 90% Emiratisation of its staff by 2020.

In addition, the UAE government believes that a poor grasp of English is one of the main employment barriers for UAE nationals; as a first remedial step, the Abu Dhabi Education Council has developed the New School Model, a critical-thinking oriented curriculum modeled on that of New South Wales. This program was unveiled in September, 2010. In February 2006, the prime minister directed the education minister to take initial steps toward improving the quality of education, including the provision of permanent classrooms, computer laboratories, and modern facilities. In April 2007, however, in a major policy speech to the nation, the UAE vice president and prime minister stated that despite the steady increase in the education budget over the previous 20 years, teaching methods and curricula were obsolete, and the education system as a whole was weak. He demanded that the ministers of education and higher education work to find innovative and comprehensive solutions.

In early 2008, the UAE's Ministry of Education launched a Mentoring Programme which assigns Western principals to 50 of 735 public schools across the UAE in an effort to modernize instructional strategies and implement Western methods of learning.

The Abu Dhabi Education Council (ADEC) has signed agreements with organizations like the International Baccalaureate Organization as part of their efforts to widen the options and meet the needs of students.

== Public health and well-being ==
The UAE initiated a program to create awareness among school-going students, setting two objectives. First, it would contribute to addressing the country's overweight problem among 13-15 year old's. Secondly, it aimed at equipping school health centers to enable them to promote active and engaged lifestyles among school students. An initiative by the Ministry of Education and the Ministry of Health, UAE.

In 2015, it collaborated with the Abu Dhabi Education and Knowledge Department to work out a curriculum on health and physical education in public schools. The major long-term outcome of the program was health benefits with fewer diseases and absences amongst school students. It involved a unique curriculum that was to be introduced in public schools starting early 2017. This was to cover all levels of school, right from kindergarten to high school. It initially started off for 10-12th-grade girls in public schools. A focus will be on the 10th graders to exercise and eat healthy. While grade 11 specialized in mental health and anti-bullying campaigns, the final level of high school was to equip the young women with knowledge on emergency aid.

Recognizing the significant impact of health and wellbeing on students' educational outcomes in the UAE, the government, in collaboration with the MOE and the MOH, has taken proactive measures to address health-related challenges faced by students. This collaborative effort has not only identified obstacles but has also succeeded in offering initiatives and programs to prepare and qualify students for adulthood, demonstrating a collective commitment to student wellbeing.

== Higher education ==
At the tertiary level, numerous institutions are available to the student body. In 1976, the United Arab Emirates University (UAEU) was established in Al Ain in Abu Dhabi Emirate. Consisting of nine colleges, it was considered by the UAE government to be the leading teaching and research institution in the country. As of 2023, 14,900 students were enrolled at UAEU.

In 1988, the first four Higher Colleges of Technology (HCT) were opened, in Abu Dhabi and Al Ain. By the academic year 2014–15, 17 campuses offered more than 75 programs, with a combined enrollment of more than 17,000 of men and women. The commercial arm of the HCT, the Centre of Excellence for Applied Research and Training, is allied with multinational companies to provide training courses and professional development. In 1998, Zayed University was opened, initially for women only, with campuses in Abu Dhabi and Dubai. A US $100.7 million purpose-built campus in Dubai opened in 2006. Zayed University accepted select groups of male students starting in 2008, and now has a significant number of male students.

The Dubai Pharmacy College is UAE's first Pharmacy college started in 1992 in Dubai. It offers both B.Pharm and M.Pharm (Clinical Pharmacy) degree that is accredited by the Ministry of Education and CAA.

American University in Dubai opened its doors in 1995 to join the successful ranks of its much older regional counterparts in Cairo and Beirut. Dubai is a center for several international universities, including branches of the U.S.-based universities Michigan State University and Rochester Institute of Technology. Another institution based on American-style higher education, the American University in the Emirates opened in 2006. Through free zones designated for educational institutions (Dubai International Academic City and Dubai Knowledge Village), Dubai also hosts many universities from other countries, including India, Pakistan, and the U.K.

In Abu Dhabi, New York Institute of Technology opened the first branch of an accredited U.S. university in 2005. Another New York-based institution, New York University, accepted its first class of students to its Abu Dhabi campus in fall 2010. After seven hundred years Université Paris-Sorbonne opened its first campus abroad in Abu Dhabi in 2006. Although its focus is largely on the arts and humanities, Emirati students attending international universities locally commonly prefer business, science, engineering and computers programs.

The UAE's first medical school, Gulf Medical University, opened in 1998 in the Emirate of Ajman. It welcomes both genders and all nationalities. Originally known as Gulf Medical College, it expanded in 2008 to include dentistry, pharmacy and other programs in association with the Royal Australian College of General Practitioners. Ajman University, established in 1988 as one of the first private universities in the UAE, is also located in Ajman.

Established in 2019, the Mohamed bin Zayed University of Artificial Intelligence (MBZUAI) in Abu Dhabi is the world's first graduate-level, research-based academic institution dedicated exclusively to AI.

UAE's first Canadian university outside Canada was opened in Dubai. Canadian University Dubai offers Canadian-based curriculum accredited by ministry of higher education.

Jaipur National University (JNU-RAK), an Indian-origin institution, has expanded its educational footprint with the establishment of a campus in Ras Al Khaimah (RAK), UAE. This campus offers students the opportunity to pursue a variety of academic programs, including those in fields such as Digital Marketing, Cyber Security, AI & ML and Hospitality Management. JNU-RAK provides students in the UAE and surrounding regions with access to quality education with an international perspective, blending the educational practices of India with those of the UAE.

In 2003 Dubai established a dedicated education zone, Dubai Knowledge Village. The 1 km long campus brings together globally recognized international universities, training centers, e-learning, and research and development companies in one location. As of early 2007, it had attracted 16 international university partners, which include Saint-Petersburg State, University of Engineering and Economics, University of Wollongong, Mahatma Gandhi University, and the Manchester Business School. Some of these institutions have since moved to a larger free zone in Dubai, Dubai International Academic City.

The Ministry of Higher Education and Scientific Research is the government ministry concerned with higher education. The Commission for Academic Accreditation (CAA), a department in the Ministry, licenses institutions and accredits degree programmes. Institutions based in free zones do not need to seek CAA approval.

== International education ==
As of January 2015, the International Schools Consultancy listed the UAE as having 507 international schools. The consultancy defines an 'international school' in the following terms "ISC includes an international school if the school delivers a curriculum to any combination of pre-school, primary or secondary students, wholly or partly in English outside an English-speaking country, or if a school in a country where English is one of the official languages, offers an English-medium curriculum other than the country's national curriculum and is international in its orientation." This definition is used by publications including The Economist. Of these schools over 35 offer one or more of the four International Baccalaureate Programmes.

The UAE has developed a diverse higher education system combining national public institutions and private universities with international models, like Khalifa University, United Arab Emirates University (UAEU), American University of Sharjah (AUS), Abu Dhabi University (ADU), Ajman University.

== Special Education ==
Special Education in the UAE consolidated over the past two decades as it has made significant strides in protecting the rights and ensuring equal opportunities for people with special needs. In 2006, the country enacted Law No. 29, which established a legal framework to guarantee equal educational opportunities for individuals with special needs. This law mandates that education be provided in both regular and special classes within mainstream schools and ensures that the curriculum is accessible through various means such as sign language, Braille, and other appropriate methods.

Further reinforcing its commitment to inclusive education, in 2017, Dubai's Knowledge and Human Development Authority (KHDA) introduced the Dubai Inclusive Education Policy Framework.

Additionally, in 2017, Sheikh Mohammed bin Rashid Al Maktoum, Vice-President of the UAE and Ruler of Dubai, introduced the term "People of Determination" as part of his national strategy to empower individuals with disabilities and foster greater societal inclusion.

The UAE signed the UN Convention on the Rights of Persons with Disabilities.

== Technical Education ==
The UAE has technical educational centers such as The Higher Colleges of Technology's Center of Excellence for Applied Research and Training (CERT). CERT offers technology programs.

== See also ==
- List of schools in the United Arab Emirates
- List of universities in the United Arab Emirates
- Education in Abu Dhabi
- Education in Dubai
- University of Wollongong in Dubai
