= University of Sharjah =

University in the United Arab Emirates

- جامعة الشارقة jāmiʿat aš-šāriqah
- Type: Private
- Established: October 1997
- Endowment: AED 605 million (2013/2014)
- Chancellor: Professor Esameldin Agamy
- President: His Highness Sheikh Sultan bin Ahmed Al Qasimi
- Faculty: 758 (Fall 2025)
- Administrative staff: 1610 (Fall 2025)
- Students: 21174 (Fall 2025)
- Undergraduates: 17309 (Fall 2025)
- Postgraduates: 3865 (fall 2025)
- Location: Sharjah, Emirate of Sharjah, United Arab Emirates; 25°17′15″N 55°28′37″E
- Campus: Urban 36,328 square metres (391,030 sq ft) University City campus; 1,970 square metres (21,200 sq ft) Khorfakkan campus; 355 square metres (3,820 sq ft) Kalba campus; 562 square metres (6,050 sq ft) Meleha campus; 380 square metres (4,100 sq ft) Dibba campus
- Newspaper: The University Forum
- Colors: Teal
- Website: sharjah.ac.ae
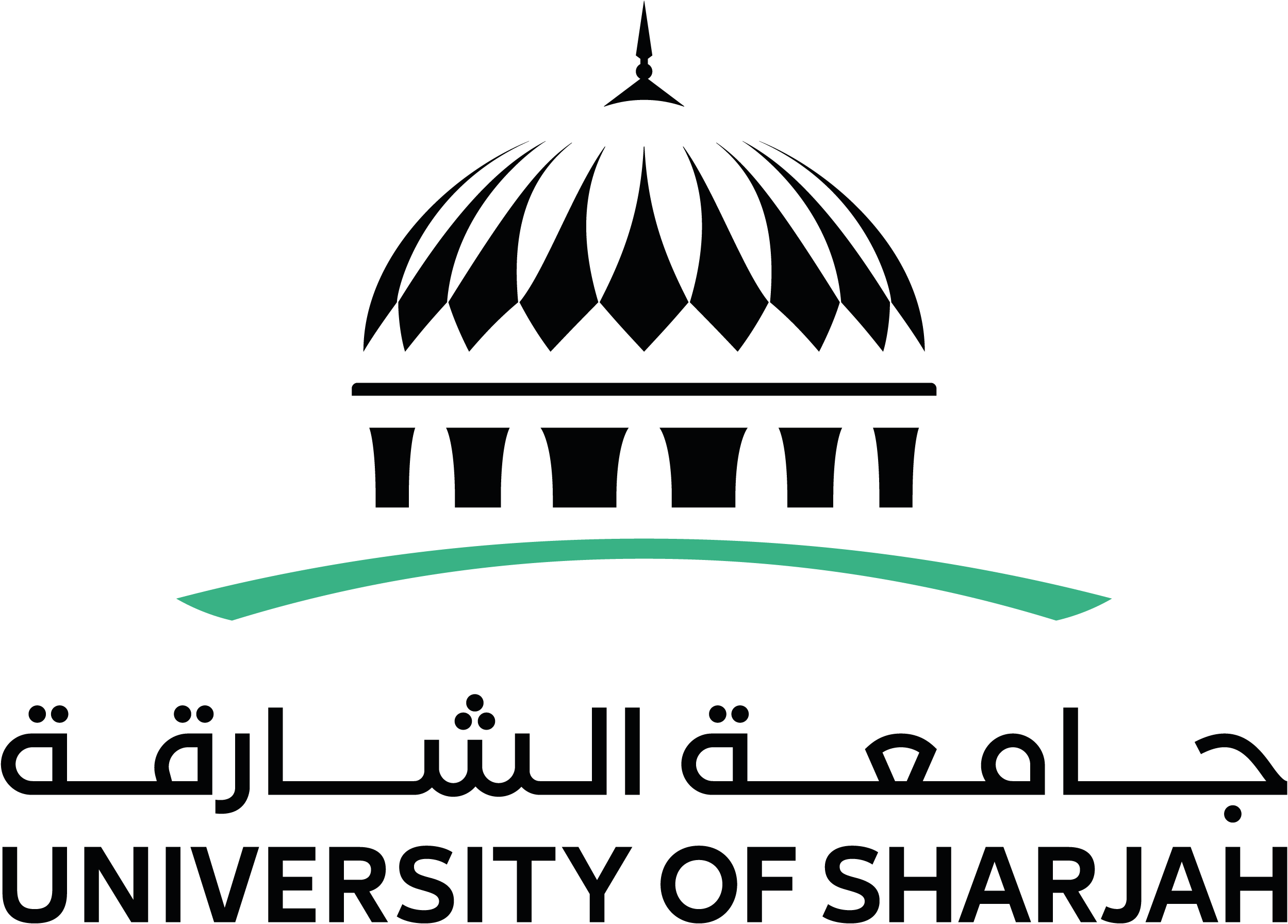

The University of Sharjah (Arabic: جامعة الشارقة, romanized: jāmiʿat aš-šāriqah; also known as UOS) is an Emirati private national university located in University City, Sharjah, United Arab Emirates. It was established in October 1997 by its founder the ruler of Sharjah Sheikh Dr. Sultan bin Muhammad Al-Qasimi to meet the emirate of Sharjah's aim of educational needs. The university goals constitute of becoming a leading academic institution in the Middle East and around the world. In addition to its main campus in Sharjah City, the university has built campus facilities to provide education, training, and research programs directly to several communities throughout the emirate, GCC, Arab countries, and internationally. Most significantly, the university plays an important role in the socioeconomic development of the emirate of Sharjah.

The main campus for the university is located on the southern edge of Sharjah in University City, which is in close proximity to the Sharjah International Airport.

== History ==
The University of Sharjah was founded in October 1997 by Sheikh Dr. Sultan bin Muhammad Al-Qasimi, a member of the supreme council of the United Arab Emirates and the Ruler of Sharjah. The university was established as a result of Sheikh Sultan's vision of a distinctive institution in the emirate of Sharjah, based upon Islamic architecture and history and in order to meet the demand of the surrounding society, in particular of the UAE and the Middle East.

As part of the Medical & Health Sciences campus, the University Teaching Hospital and the University Teaching Dentistry Hospital were also inaugurated on June 11, 2011, by the president.

The Stock Market for Training virtual monitor was commenced on October 1, 2012. The monitor was set up by the Emirates Securities and Commodities Authority. The virtual monitor was made in a similar fashion to the Dubai Financial Market and the Abu Dhabi Securities Exchange virtual monitor's.

On 24 March 2012, the three-floored library on the woman's campus was opened followed by opening a men's library in the Men's campus in the next year. Each library has been constructed on an area of more than 10,000 square meters and has the capacity to hold up to a million books. The inauguration of the library increased the total number of the university's libraries up to nine libraries.

In December 2021, the ruler of Sharjah appointed Sultan bin Ahmed Al Qasimi as President of the University of Sharjah and chairman of its board of trustees.

== Campus ==
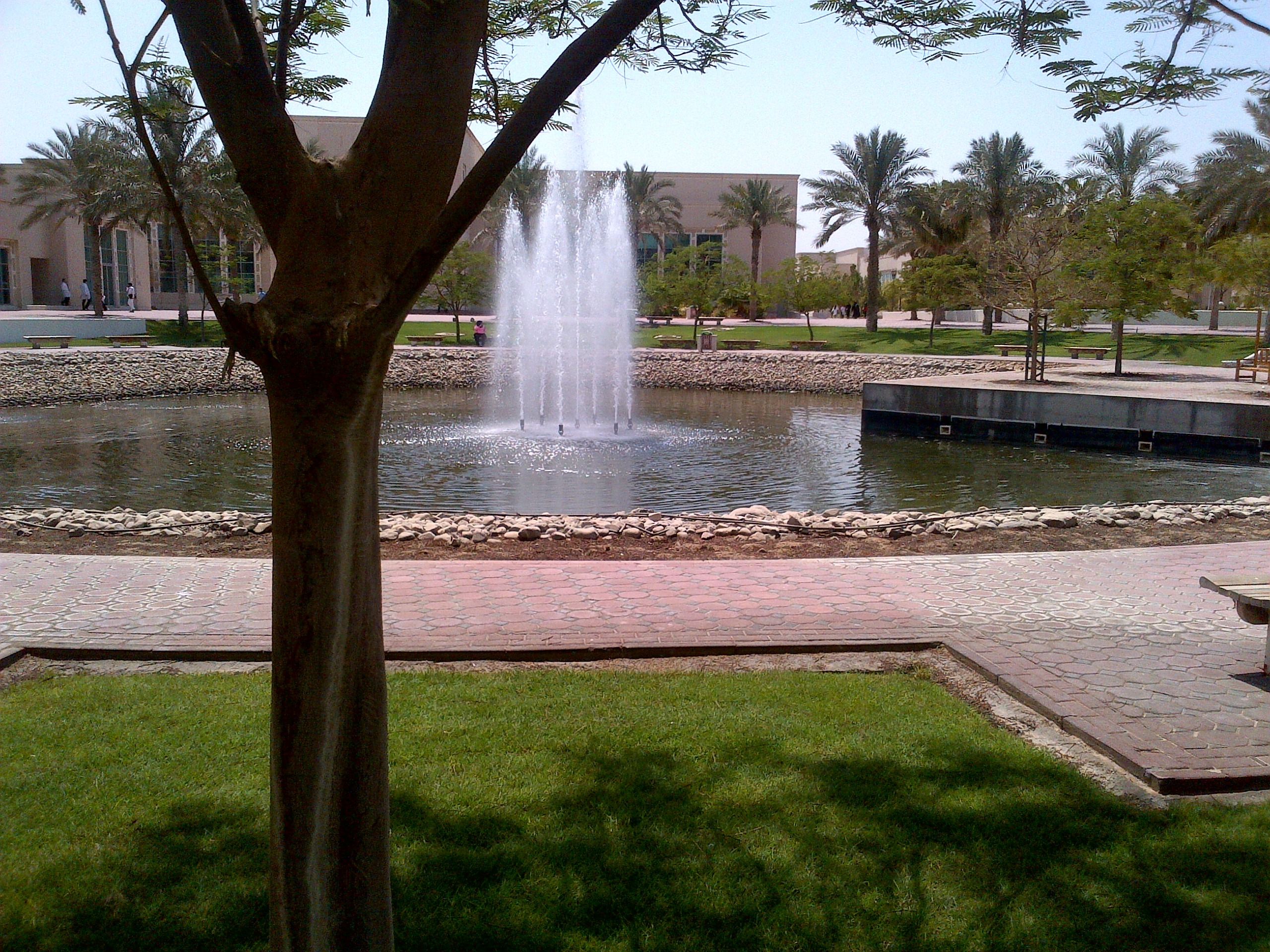
The fountain at the center of the Medical & Health Sciences campus, a central campus landmark.

=== Student Center ===
There are two student centers around University city campus which are designed to house dean of student affairs office, student unions offices, offices for student clubs and societies, a fine arts room, a bookstore, branches for the Sharjah Cooperative Society and Sharjah Islamic Bank, and a number of small convenience commercial shops. Other services available in the student center include, barbershops, and various restaurants and coffee shops.

=== Dormitory ===
The University of Sharjah has two separate dormitories on University City campus which are under the supervision of the dormitory supervisors. The Deanship of students affairs is responsible for organizing entertainment, sports events and weekly outings for all students living in the dorms.

The university offers students the choice from one, two and three-bedroom dorm rooms. Dorms are provided with clinics, study halls, computer labs, laundry facilities, garden areas, TV rooms, reception halls, and other areas for recreational activities.

=== Transportation ===
Transportation services offered for dormitory students include transport to shopping centres, transport to Sharjah and Dubai airports for female students, and emergency transportation to hospitals or medical centres for female students. Bus services are also offered between the dormitories and the colleges. Other transport services include in-campus bus services and transportation for students attending off-campus training.

== Academics ==
The University of Sharjah offers the largest number of accredited programs in the United Arab Emirates.[RH1] [RH2] The university currently offers a total of 150 academic degree programs including 63 bachelor's degrees, 60 master's degrees, 23 PhD degrees, 4 diploma degrees. The university is fully licensed and all its programs are accredited by the Commission for Academic Accreditation (CAA) of the Ministry of Education in the United Arab Emirates. All Engineering Programs are accredited by ABET. The Bachelor of Science in Computer Science degree, Bachelor of Science in IT and Multimedia degree, Bachelor of Science in Chemistry, Bachelor of Science in Mathematics, and Bachelor of Science in Biotechnology are accredited internationally by ABET (Applied Science branch). All Communication programs accredited by ACEJMC (Accrediting Council on Education in Journalism and Mass Communication) and All College of Business Administration Programs are accredited by AACSB (International Accreditation). All undergraduate degrees in applied biology, mathematics and chemistry are accredited by US ABET.

=== Medical Centers and Surgical Institutions ===
Additionally, the Sharjah Surgical Institute (SSI), which is located in the Medical and Health Sciences campus and offers training program for surgeons from the region, was established with the cooperation of international partners, including Johnson and Johnson and Olympus. The Clinical Training Center (CTC) is accredited as a medical training and testing center by the: Royal College of Surgeons of England, International Federation of Surgery and Obesity and Metabolic Disorders(IFSO), European Association for Endoscopic Surgery (EAES), American Heart Association, and the Ministry of Health in United Arab Emirates.

University rankings

Global – Overall
- QS World: =328 (2025)
- THE World: 301–350 (2025)
- USNWR Global: =245 (2025)

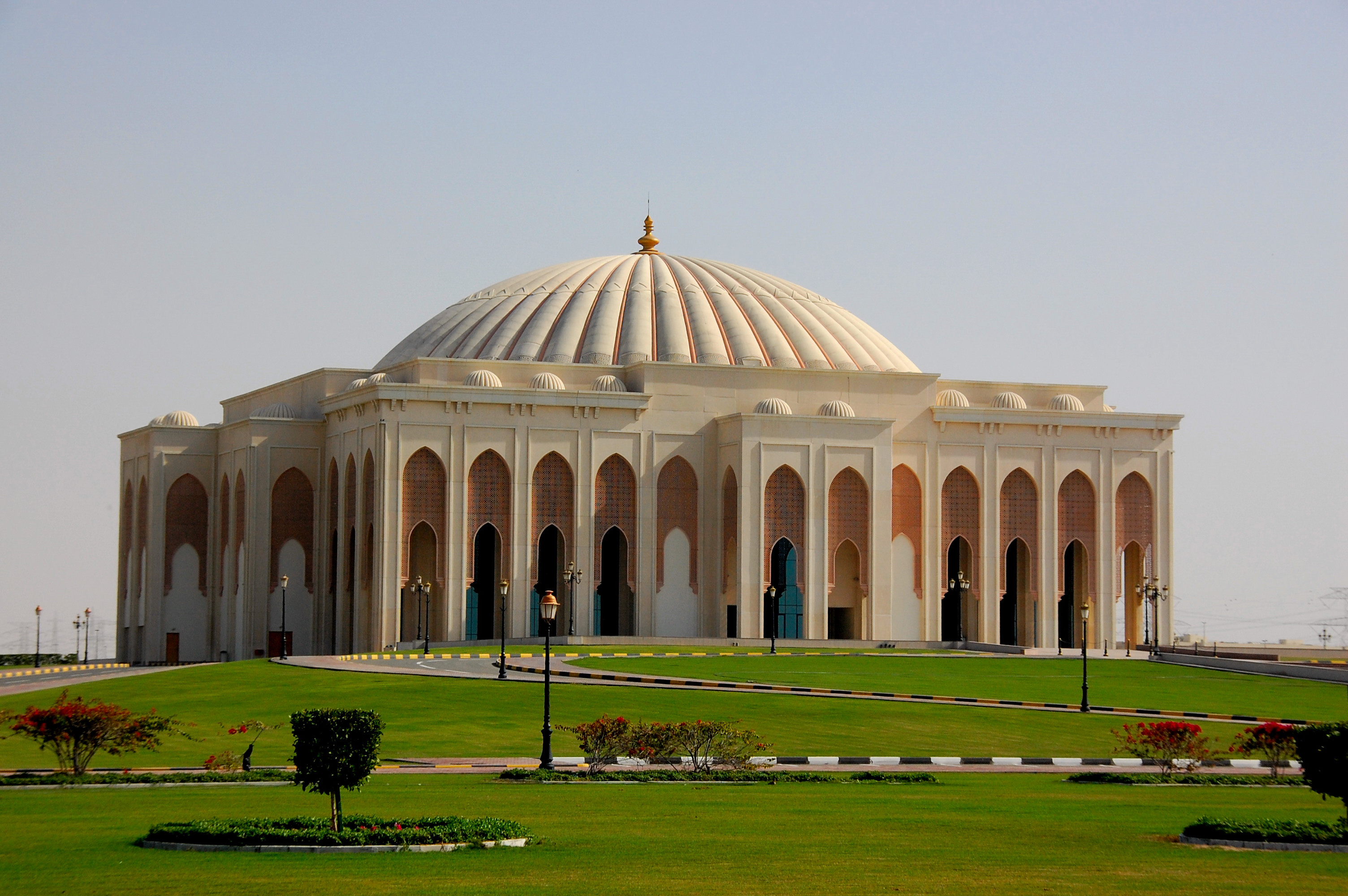
University City Hall is the largest hall located in main campus. Graduation ceremonies are notably held here.

=== Student body ===
As of Fall semester, 2025-2026 the university had an enrollment of 21,174 students: 17,309undergraduate students and 3865 academic degree-seeking graduate students. Of all students, 11,934 are Emirati nationals, 5,192 are other Arabs, 2,154 are from GCC countries, and 1,894 are international students.

=== Research institutes and centres ===
The University of Sharjah houses three research institutes: the Research Institute of Humanities and Social Science (RIHSS), the Research Institute of Medical and Health Sciences (RIMHS), and the Research Institute of Sciences and Engineering (RISE). Each of the research institutes is further divided into research centres.

The Research Institute of Humanities and Social Science houses four research centres: the Centre for Applied Sociology Studies, the Centre for Family and Child Studies, the Sharjah Centre for Public Opinion Polls, and the Sharjah Innovation Centre for Legal and Judicial Studies.

The Research Institute of Medical and Health Sciences includes three reseach centres: the Centre of Excellence for Cancer Research, the Centre of Excellence for Public Health, and the Centre of Excellence for Precision Medicine.

The Research Institute of Sciences and Engineering includes seven research centres: the Advanced Biotechnology Research Centre, the Centre for Advanced Materials Research, the Centre for Data Analytics and Cybersecurity, the Centre for Sustainable Energy and Power Systems Research, the Smart Automation and Communication Technologies Research Centre, the Sustainable Systems, Technologies and Infrastructure Research Centre, and the Water and Environment Conservation Research Centre.

== Athletics ==
The Sport Department regulates students participation in a variety of sports and other recreational activities in the University of Sharjah. The university is equipped with two separate sports centers designated one for males and the other for females, both of which are equipped with a swimming pool, sports hall, and gymnasium.

Some of the athletic activities organized by the Sport Department include swimming, volleyball, karate, shooting, aerobics, yoga, table tennis, chess, billiards, ground tennis, squash, football and basketball. The Sports Complex in the male campus also houses a fully equipped football field. The university awards students who excel in athletics grants and scholarships.

== Gallery ==
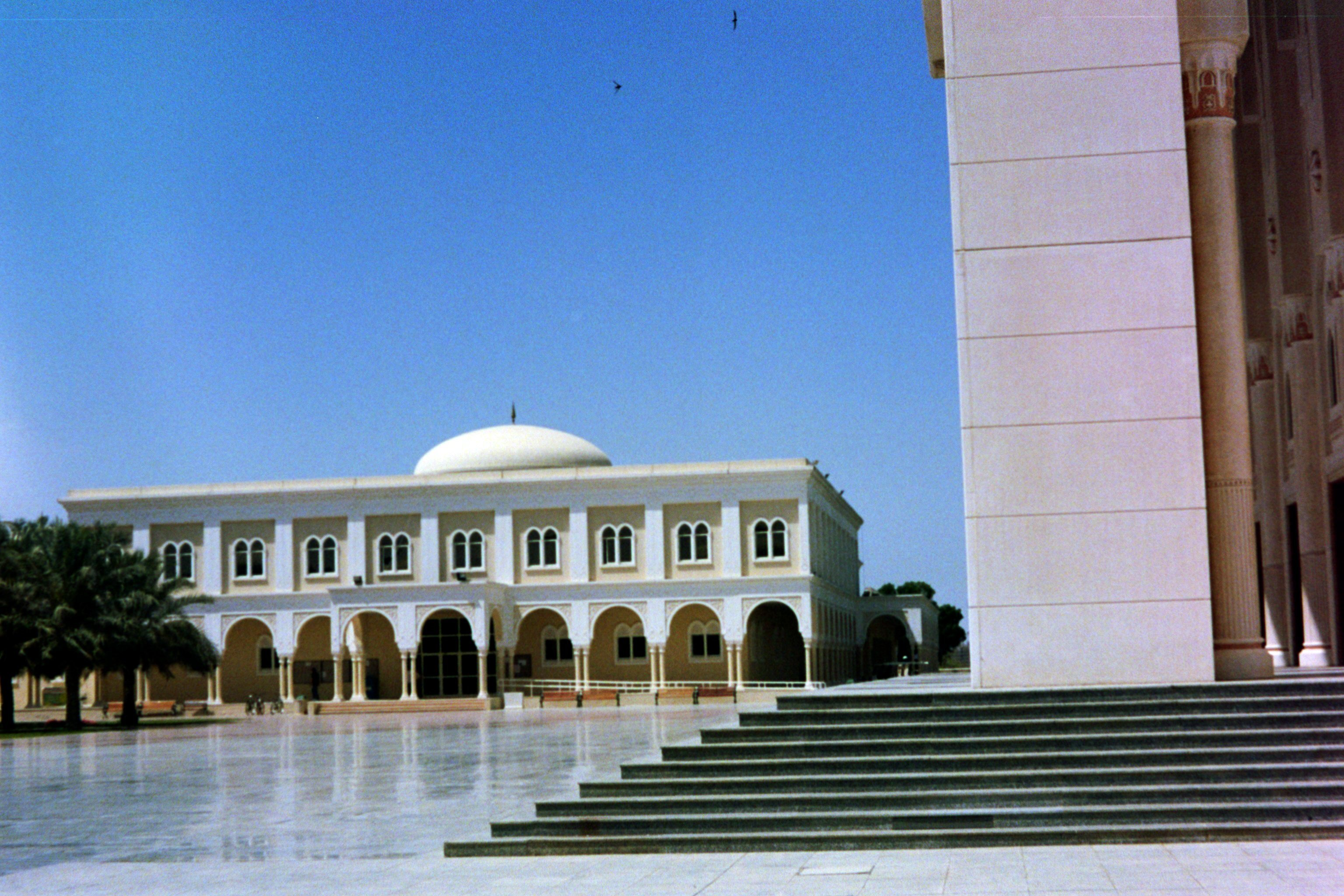
University of Sharjah campus

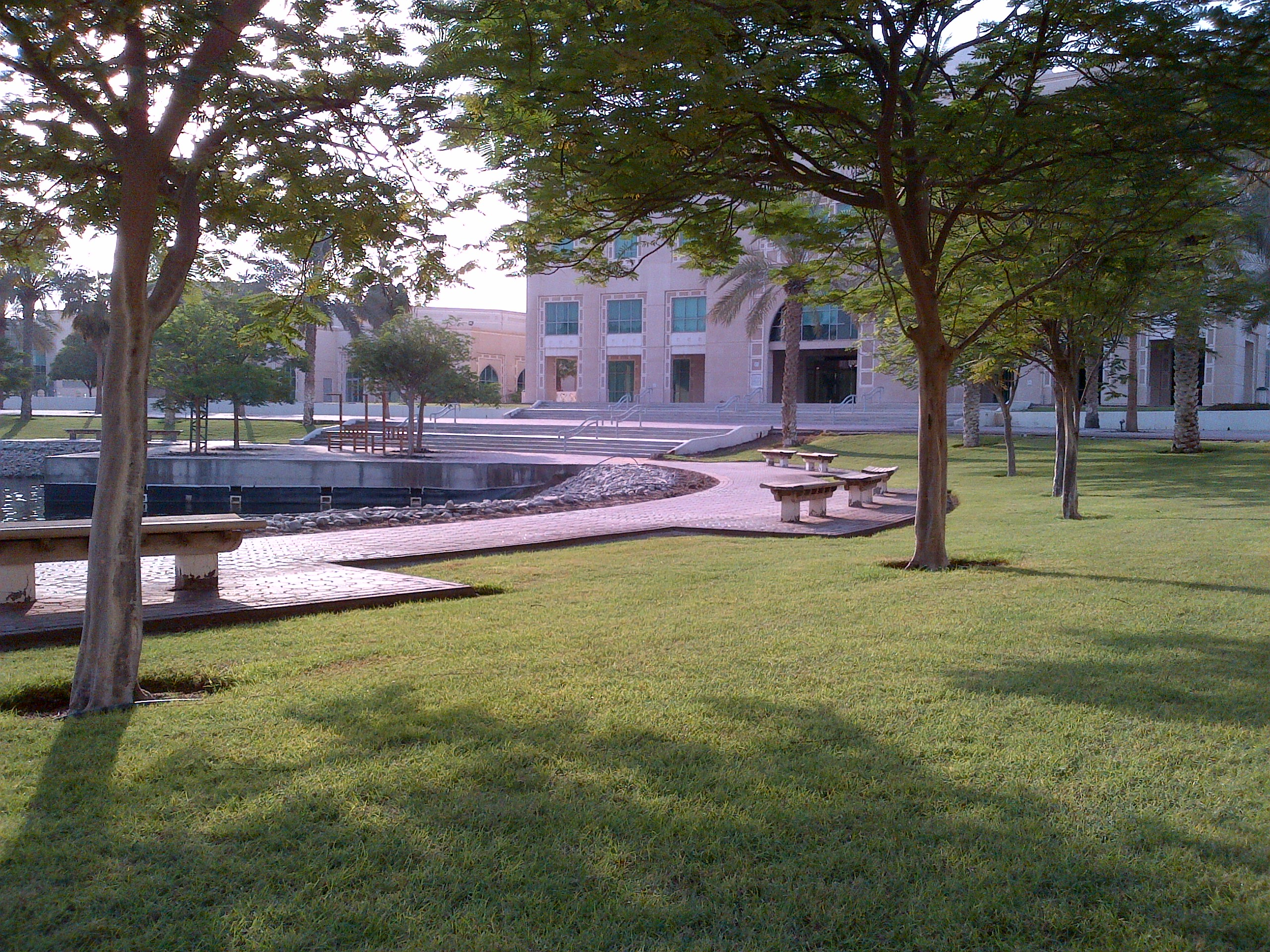
Medical and Health Sciences campus view

== See also ==
- List of Islamic educational institutions
