= Ministry of Education (United Arab Emirates) =

Government ministry of the United Arab Emirates

- وزارة التربية والتعليم
- Logo of the UAE Ministry of Education

Ministry overview
- Formed: 2 February 1972; 54 years ago
- Preceding agencies: Ministry of Education; Ministry of Higher Education and Scientific Research
- Jurisdiction: Federal government of the United Arab Emirates
- Headquarters: Dubai, United Arab Emirates
- Annual budget: AED 9.8 billion (US$2.67 billion) (2023)
- Ministers responsible: Sarah bint Yousif Al Amiri, Minister of Education; Sara Musallam, Minister of State for Early Education
- Child Ministry: Commission for Academic Accreditation
- Website: moe.gov.ae

The Ministry of Education (MoE) (Arabic: وزارة التربية والتعليم) is a federal government ministry in the United Arab Emirates that is responsible for regulating all forms of education in the country. Established by through the Federal Law No. (1) of 1972 issued by Sheikh Zayed, it has its main offices in Abu Dhabi, Dubai and Ajman.

Public education is fully funded by the government and is free to UAE citizens at all levels.

== COVID-19 Response ==
After all schools had to be closed as of March 2020 to control the spread of COVID-19, the UAE Ministry of Education turned to distance learning for all academic levels.

The UAE Ministry of Education installed in March 2020 a FOR-A HVS-1200 video switcher at its headquarters in Ajman to drive a virtual studio system for distance learning programs, which has become essential due to the COVID-19 pandemic.

== Higher Education ==
The Ministry of Education also oversees universities across the United Arab Emirates through accreditation and quality assurance, including institutions like Ajman University.
