= Knowledge and Human Development Authority =

Educational quality assurance agency of the Emirate of Dubai

Coordinates: 25°7′26″N 55°24′37″E

- Arabic: هيئة المعرفة والتنمية البشرية

Agency overview
- Formed: 28 December 2006; 19 years ago
- Jurisdiction: Government of Dubai
- Headquarters: Dubai, United Arab Emirates
- Agency executive: Aisha Abdulla Miran, Director General
- Website: www.khda.gov.ae

Knowledge and Human Development Authority (KHDA) (Arabic: هيئة المعرفة والتنمية البشرية) is the educational quality assurance and regulatory authority of the Government of Dubai, United Arab Emirates which is responsible for evaluation and accreditation of higher educational institutions and universities in the Emirate of Dubai. Established in 2006 by the country's Vice President and Prime Minister Sheikh Mohammed bin Rashid al-Maktoum, it is the main body that oversees the growth of private education sector in the emirate, including early childhood education centers and schools.

KHDA oversees the private education sector in Dubai, higher education providers, and training institutes. KHDA is responsible for the growth and quality of private education in Dubai.

Between 2008 and 2018, the number of students attending schools rated good or better has more than doubled - from 30% in 2008/09 to 66% in the 2017/18 academic year. Likewise the number of Emirati students attending schools rated good or better has increased significantly, from 26% in 2008/09, to 62% in 2017/18.

== Areas of Authority ==
=== Early Childhood Education Centres ===
Early childhood centers or nurseries should follow certain guidelines set by the local Ministry of Social Affairs. There are over 120 child care centers registered in Dubai. KHDA offers a method to help parents choose a nursery wisely. In KHDA's webpage, there are three steps that parents should consider when choosing a nursery. Firstly, the curriculum and learning approach of the center, whether it be through the languages spoken or the methods used to teach the children. Secondly, the quality of provision, and that comes within caring and nurturing the child. Lastly, the environment, as to how many people are monitoring the children and making sure they are safe.

=== Schools ===
The Dubai Schools Inspection Bureau (DSIB), a part of the KHDA, is a group of inspectors who assess the schools in Dubai, United Arab Emirates. Inspectors use a six-point scale to express their judgements. The four levels on the scale are defined as follows:

1. Outstanding - Exceptionally high quality of performance or practice.
2. Very Good - The expected level for every school in Dubai.
3. Good - The minimum level of acceptability required for Dubai. All key aspects of performance and practice in every school should meet or exceed this level.
4. Weak - Quality not yet at the level acceptable for schools in Dubai. Schools will be expected to take urgent measures to improve the quality of any aspect of their performance or practice that is judged at this level.
5. Very Weak - the measures to protect and safeguard students are not founded.

What are schools assessed on?

Students Progress	Language, Sciences, and Mathematics attainments and progress
Teaching for effective learning	Islamic Education and Social Studies attainments and progresses
The effectiveness of leadership	Social Responsibility, Development and Innovation
Improvement Planning	Health and Safety
Partnership with parents and community	Management and Resources

=== DSIB Ratings ===
KHDA publishes the rating of each inspected school in Dubai on its website and in the Dubai School Inspections Bureau (DSIB) Annual Report. The DSIB annual report is released each September. A detailed report on each inspected school is also available online.

=== Additional Inspection Focus Areas ===
Other inspection areas include assessing the Inclusive Education as well as attaining the school's curriculum. The Inclusive Education part of the School Inspection Supplement has been initiated to abide by Dubai's 2020 vision to become on the most inclusive cities. Moreover, students of SEND (special educational needs and disabilities) or students of determination should be accompanied by a Learning Support Assistants (LSAs) whom will be assessed according to their implementation of the Strategic Inclusive Education Plan.
Additionally, Moral Education was announced by Sheikh Mohammed bin Zayed to be part of school curricula in the UAE. Moral Education is formed by four pillars,

- character and morality
- the individual and the community
- cultural studies
- civic studies.

KHDA will be assessing the school's Moral Education's provision with the curriculum, teaching style, and parents. Moral Education is entitled with UAE's moral values which seeks to help in the student's personal development and growth. It is to emphasize on the importance of students' behavior to ensure affective domains.

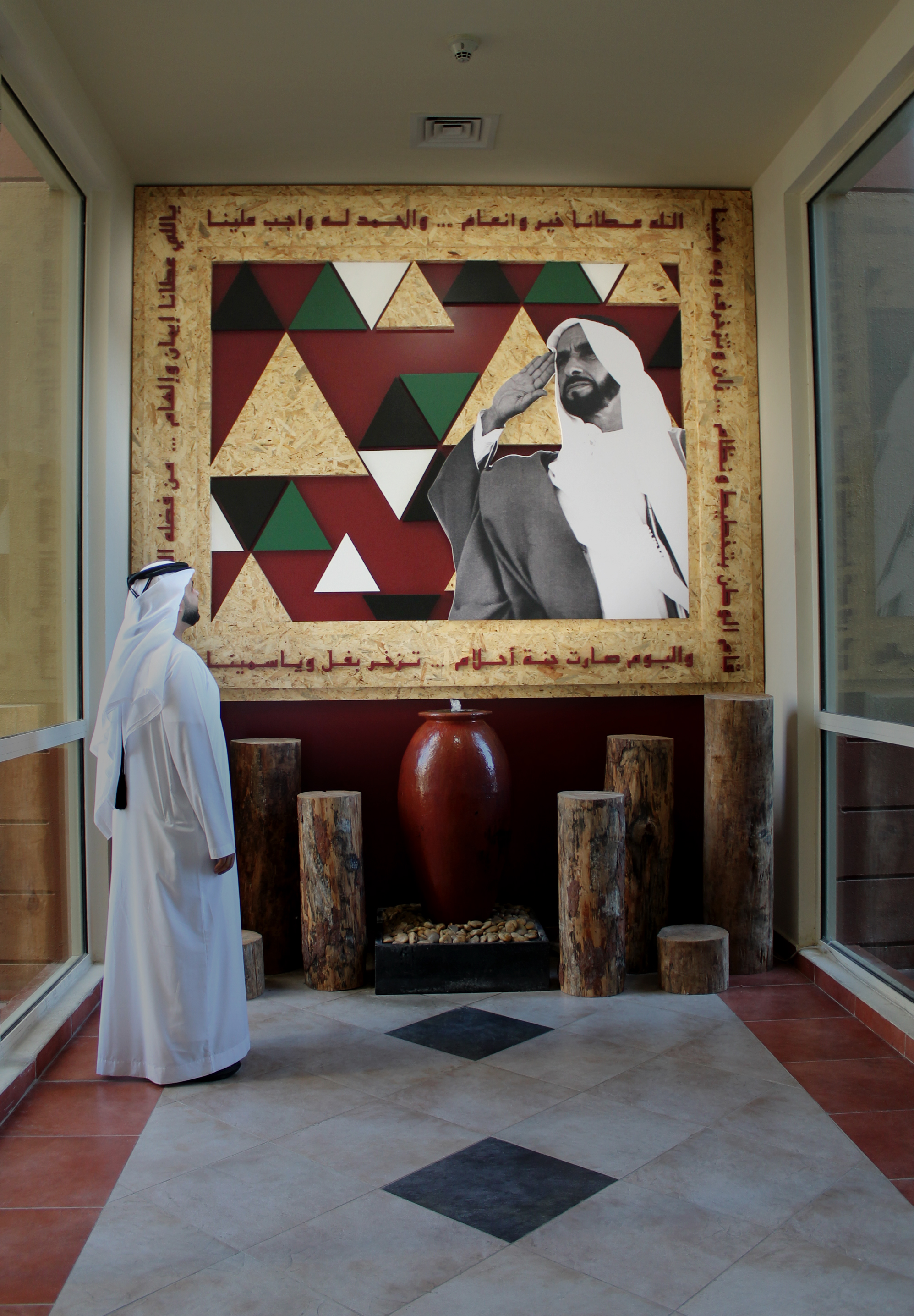

=== School Parent Contract ===
KHDA launched a new legally binding initiative outlining the rights and responsibilities of both parents and schools in June 2013. The first schools to introduce the contracts at the start of the 2013/2014 academic year will be Dubai Modern Education School, Al Ittihad Private School – Al Mamzar, Al Ittihad Private School – Jumeirah, School of Modern Skills, Greenwood International School and American Academy in Al Mizhar.

Statistics
1,416 Inspections
137,208 Lessons Observed
12,566 Hours Spent in Classes
113, 242 Students Surveyed

=== Higher Education / Universities ===
Dubai has encouraged the establishment of international university branch campuses (HEP Branches), whose home-base campuses (HEP Home) are located outside the country, to provide high quality international degrees to its citizens and expatriate residents. HEP Branches are located across several Free Zones which allow 100% foreign ownership in tax-free environments. Clarification of the different types of HEPs operating in Dubai, is necessary to understand the higher education landscape. HEPs in Dubai can be located either in- or outside a Free Zone. Three main types of HEPs operate in the Emirate: HEP Branch, HEP Local and HEP Federal.

=== Training Institutions ===
With more than 800 approved training institutes offering a broad range of courses – from foreign languages and computer training to engineering, banking and finance – Dubai is an important regional destination for professional development. KHDA aims to support the delivery of high quality technical and vocational education and training, thus meeting the needs of residents and employers in Dubai.

== KHDA Initiatives ==
=== What Works ===
What Works is an initiative to help transform Dubai's private education sector through collaboration. With the support of private schools in Dubai and local community partners, What Works was initiated in September 2012. Based on the principles of Appreciative Inquiry, What Works is a programme for teachers and school leaders in Dubai's private education sector, designed to increase collaboration within the sector and improve student outcomes. Centred on six events taking place each academic year, What Works brings together subject teachers, heads and principals to share what they do best at their schools.

A central tenet of What Works is that it relies on local expertise to strengthen the overall quality of education in Dubai. During each What Works event, teachers participate in workshops given by their colleagues at other schools. What Works also promotes a culture of collaboration between schools throughout the year. In its Head to Head programme, principals and subject heads visit on another's schools to share best practices. This is a unique innovation given Dubai's private schools landscape, which includes schools teaching 15 different curricula. Quite often, the learning exchanges involve schools offering different curricula.

=== Abundance ===
In 2016, the KHDA the Abundance Group project, which invited high-achieving schools in Dubai to share their learning with others to help improve the quality of all schools in Dubai. Schools rated Very Good or Good during annual inspections were offered the option of a differentiated inspection based on self-evaluation, allowing them to focus their resources on giving back to other schools. Sixteen Outstanding-rated schools participated in the project, offering workshops and training for teachers and senior leaders from schools rated Acceptable or lower during the project's first year, with partnerships continuing since.

=== Dubai Student Wellbeing Census ===
Dubai's vision to be one of the happiest cities in the world by 2021 has pushed forward KHDA to investigate students’ satisfaction. KHDA has partnered with the Department of Education and Child Development of South Australia to deliver a five-year project to measure students’ wellbeing. It was first conducted in November 2017, asking around 65,000 students across 168 schools about their happiness, relationships, lifestyle, among other questions. The results of the Census said that the three main contributing factors to a student's wellbeing is a good breakfast, good night's sleep, and good relationships with adults. Furthermore, according to the data:

- 84% of students are happy most of the time
- 77% of students feel safe at school
- 76% of students enjoy close friendships

Report

=== Lighthouse ===
KHDA's strategy to improve the quality of education starts with the principals. The formation of Lighthouse is to provide a platform for principals to share ideas with one another that will help in the development of all schools in Dubai. Each year, there is a theme that is discussed among the school leaders. An example would be of this year's theme: proposing a research explaining different methods to enhance students’ wellbeing.

=== Living Arabic ===
Launched in October 2015, Living Arabic is a programme organised by Arabic teachers in Dubai, for teachers in Dubai. It shares the best of what language teachers are doing to inspire the love of Arabic in their students, and helps inspire other Arabic teachers to deliver lessons that harmonize with how students want to learn. The events are open to existing Arabic teachers, and all other teachers interested in incorporating Arabic into their lessons.

=== IPEN in Dubai ===
KHDA's partnership with International Positive Education Network is to encourage improvement in not only academics but also character building. KHDA was invited to showcase private school sector in the Festival of Positive Education. KHDA's team along with “Happiness Ambassadors” (school teachers), traveled to Dallas to attend festival. The festival brought together educational providers and psychologists to help foster positive education in schools all around the world.

=== Dubai Saturday Clubs and Hatta Wellbeing Camp ===
The initiation of Dubai Saturday Clubs is inspired by Sorrell's Foundation National Saturday Club. KHDA offered a programme along with social entrepreneurs especially to enhance students’ wellbeing by creating meaningful community projects. It has brought together students of different schools to work with one another and promoted meaningful skills. KHDA concentrates on students’ wellbeing as much as it does on their perseverance of the highest quality of education. The Hatta Wellbeing Camp is an overnight excursion for students’ of different schools.

=== Rahhal ===
Rahhal is part of 10x – a Dubai Future Foundation initiative to take Dubai ten years into the future – in just two years. Meaning traveller in Arabic, the message of Rahhal is simple: the world is a classroom, and all learning counts. Rahhal is a fully customisable platform that will help turn anyone, and any organisation, into a learning provider, and turn all Dubai residents into lifelong learners. It will be a conduit that harnesses the community's knowledge and skills and channels it to each individual learner. All learning on the platform will be given the stamp of approval by Dubai government. Rahhal provides a creative and innovative alternative to mainstream education – an alternative that brings out the best from within the community and recognises learning wherever it occurs. It is a platform that helps to integrate learning with life, and life with learning.

By providing a supportive regulatory environment, Rahhal will enhance learning opportunities for all members of the community, whether they're children or adults. It will support learners with special education needs as well as those with special gifts and talents; It will diversify the choices for parents who wish to supplement their children's education; and it will provide adults with a flexible, modular form of learning that can be used to further their careers or enrich their lives. KHDA is currently working with parents, schools, government bodies and private organisations to bring Rahhal to life, united by a grand vision and a common purpose. Rahhal is currently in pilot phase and will be made available to a greater number of learners in the months.
