= GEMS Our Own Indian School =

- جيمس مدرستنا الهندية
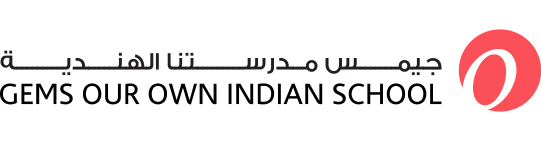

Location
- Dubai, 26845; United Arab Emirates; 25.1707°N 55.2618°E

Information
- Former name: Varkey International Private School
- Motto: Nurturing Dynamic Learners in an Inclusive Environment (رعاية المتعلمين الديناميكيين في بيئة شاملة)
- Established: 1991 (35 years ago)
- Founders: Mariamma Varkey; K.S. Varkey; Sunny Varkey
- School board: CBSE (India)
- Authority: KHDA (Emirate of Dubai)
- Principal: Lalitha Suresh
- Staff: ~171 Teachers
- Enrollment: ~3735 Students
- Student to teacher ratio: 22:1
- Language: English
- Hours in school day: Regular Days: 6 Hours . Fridays: 3.5 Hours .
- Houses: Aries; Taurus; Aquarius; Leo
- Nickname: OIS
- School fees: 7,209 - 14,696
- Affiliation: GEMS Education; Eco-Schools; UNESCO Associated Schools Network; Microsoft Showcase School; HP Idea School; Toastmasters International; Emirates Scout Association
- Website: www.gemsoo-alquoz.com/en

GEMS Our Own Indian School is a CBSE-affiliated school in Dubai, United Arab Emirates. The school was established in 1991 to provide education to children from the Indian diaspora living in the Emirates. The school has been rated as "very good" by the KHDA during the DSIB Inspections for the academic year 2023-2024. The school started in 1991 as Varkey International Private School and renamed itself to GEMS Our Own Indian School in 2012. The school saw its relocation to its current campus in Al Quoz 1 in 2002. The school vision is 'Nurturing Dynamic Learners in an Inclusive Environment'

== History ==
The school started as Varkey International Private School in an effort to provide education to the Keralite community living in the Emirates and was affiliated with the Kerala State Board. The school was located in Al Gharoud until it moved to the current campus on Al Meydan Street. The school opened its doors to children in 1991 with Mrs. Annie George as its first principal who led the school until 1999. The school began with 438 students and 30 teachers and basic support staff. After its relocation in 2002, it was renamed Our Own Indian School in 2004 and again to its current name GEMS Our Own Indian School in 2012. Lalitha Suresh became the school's principal in 2012 along with other major changes that laid the foundation for the current school. The school received their first "Very-Good" DSIB rating for the academic year 2022-23. The school became a fully co-ed school starting from the academic year 2024-25. The school is rumoured to again relocate its campus in the academic year 2027-28 from the current location to which it had relocated in 2002, marking the end of 25 years in the current campus.

=== The early leadership ===
The school was founded by the Mariamma Varkey, her husband K.S. Varkey and their son, Sunny Varkey. Mariamma Varkey and her family moved to the Emirate of Dubai in 1959, 12 years before the Unification of the Emirates. She was an English teacher from the Indian state of Kerala who moved to the Emirate. She and her husband K.S. Varkey established the Our Own English High School in 1968. She was also a key role in establishing the Varkey International Private School in 1991 and was a major part of its leadership till her death at the age of 89 in 2021.

== Overview ==
The school has approximately 171 teachers and 3735 students of which 349 are children of determination. The largest nationality for both students and teachers at the school is Indian. A regular school day starts at 7:40 am and ends at 1:35 pm, whereas on Fridays, in light of the Jumu'ah prayer offered by Muslim students, the school day starts at 7:40 am and ends at 11:10 am.

=== Campus ===
The school campus covers an area of 11,994 square meters (129,102 square feet) with the average classroom measuring 50 square meters, there are 106 classrooms. The school also has 6 laboratories measuring 70 square meters on average.

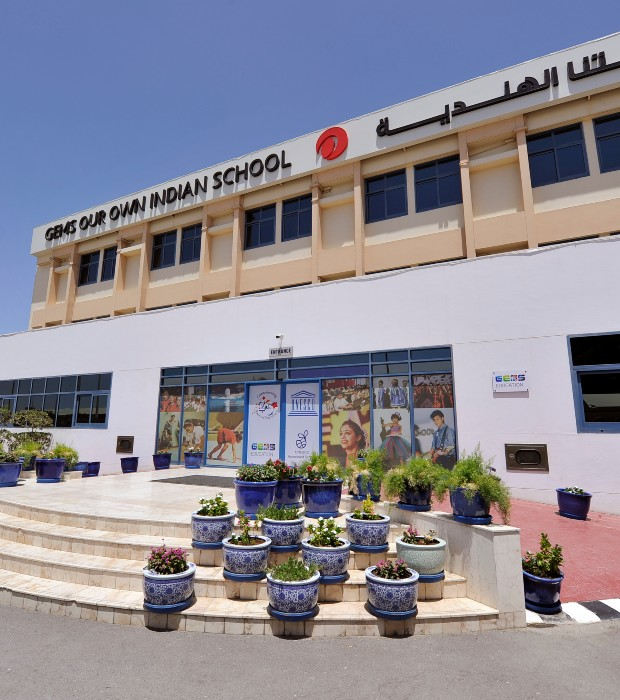
The Main Entrance to the school

=== Extra-curricular activities ===
The school promotes extra-curricular activities of all kinds. It has multiple student-led clubs that promote communication skills, photography, art, music and others. The school also offers a volleyball, basketball court and a cricket net. Every year the school hosts a United Nations Simulation conference debate with students representing different countries.

=== KHDA inspection report ===
The KHDA (Knowledge and Human Development Authority) is the primary authority for education in the Emirate of Dubai. They create an inspection report every year of all the educational institutions in the emirate. This is done by the DSIB (Dubai School Inspection Bureau), a branch of the KHDA. Inspections normally start in October every year and go on till February and occasionally beyond.

School name	Curriculum	Year	Rating
Our Own Indian School	CBSE	2009-2010	Acceptable
Our Own Indian School	CBSE	2010-2011	Good
Our Own Indian School	CBSE	2011-2012	Good
GEMS Our Own Indian School	CBSE	2012-2013	Good
GEMS Our Own Indian School	CBSE	2013-2014	Good
GEMS Our Own Indian School	CBSE	2014-2015	Acceptable
GEMS Our Own Indian School	CBSE	2015-2016	Good
GEMS Our Own Indian School	CBSE	2016-2017	Good
GEMS Our Own Indian School	CBSE	2017-2018	Good
GEMS Our Own Indian School	CBSE	2018-2019	Good
GEMS Our Own Indian School	CBSE	2019-2020	Good
GEMS Our Own Indian School	CBSE	2022-2023	Very-Good
GEMS Our Own Indian School	CBSE	2023-2024	Very-Good

=== Uniforms ===
The school's uniforms consist of a white shirt with blue stripes and navy trousers or shorts (boys and girls), navy skirts (for girls), a navy-blue tie (grades 9-12 boys), a navy-blue neck scarf (grades 9-12 girls), navy socks (grades 1-10), black shoes and white shoes (core and physical education respectively), and black leather belts. The grades 11 and 12 students have special dark grey blazers, trousers and socks. The physical education uniform consists of a t-shirt and trackpants in either of the four house colours. The kindergarten uniform consists of a blue and white polo with navy blue trackpants or shorts. The school uniform is issued by Threads.

== CBSE and other affiliations ==
The school is a for-profit managed by GEMS Education since 2000 when the company was established and administered by the Varkey Group until then. The school is recognized by the United Arab Emirates Ministry of Education and the Central Board of Secondary Education, New Delhi (Affiliation No. 6630046) which is India's national-level education board managed by the Government of India.
