= Saeed Khalifa Mohammed al‑Fuqaei =

Saeed Khalifa Mohammed Al-Fuqaei
- Born: November 30, 1976 (age 49); Rashidiya, Dubai, United Arab Emirates
- Father: Khalifa Mohammed Al-Fuqaei

Saeed Khalifa Mohammed Al‑Fuqaei (born November 30, 1976) is an Emirati entrepreneur and businessman, founder and chairman of Shuraa Group and Voltron Group.

== Early life and education ==
Al‑Fuqaei was born in Rashidiya, Dubai, United Arab Emirates, as one of 16 children. From 1993 to 1998, he attended a military boarding school. He has stated that his father, Khalifa Mohammed Al‑Fuqaei (1921–2014), who worked as a sea captain, influenced his approach to work and personal values.

== Career ==
Al‑Fuqaei began his professional career in the maritime and logistics sector. From 1998 to 2000, he worked at Sheikh Zayed Port, followed by a tenure at Jebel Ali Port from 2000 to 2008. In 2001, while still working at the port, Al‑Fuqaei launched a 150-square-foot typing center in Rashidiya with one public relations officer (PRO), which laid the groundwork for Shuraa Management & Consultancy.

The company offered business setup services, trade licensing, government documentation, tax, accounting, and other corporate solutions in Dubai. Shuraa has reportedly facilitated between 35,000 and 50,000 business setups, with monthly company formations ranging from 300 to 1,300.

Shuraa Group operates a range of subsidiaries and ventures, including Shuraa Business Setup, Shuraa Tax & Accounting, Shuraa Business Centers, Shuraa Medical Center (AMARA Aesthetic Studio), Shuraa Banking Services, and Shuraa Education, which was launched in 2021.

The group has also developed hospitality projects such as the Pulse Hotel in Jaddaf and the Orchid View Hotel in Bur Dubai, the latter of which was later sold. Additional ventures include the original Legend Business Setup, Carpe Diem Factory, and various service-oriented entities.

In addition to Shuraa, Al‑Fuqaei founded the Voltron Group, a separate entity focused on electromechanical and design services.
