= Nad Shamma =

Nad Shamma ند شما
- Community
- Interactive map of Nad Shamma
- Coordinates: 25.22001°N 55.38895°E
- Country: United Arab Emirates
- Emirate: Dubai
- City: Dubai

Area
  - Total: 1.36 km^{2} (0.53 sq mi)

Population (2000)
  - Total: 1,208
  - Density: 888/km^{2} (2,300/sq mi)
- Community number: 213

Nad Shamma (Arabic: ند شما) or Nad Al Shamma is a locality in Dubai, United Arab Emirates (UAE). It is located south of Dubai International Airport and was originally part of the locality of Al Rashidiya. Nad Shamma is bordered to the south by Nad Al Hammar, to the east by Umm Ramool, to the north by Mirdif and to the west by Al Rashidiya.

Route E 311 ( Sheikh Mohammed Bin Zayed Road ) forms the eastern periphery of the locality. Nad Shamma is a developing area and is largely residential. It houses several villas and town houses.
