= Al Warqa =

Al Warqaa ٱلْوَرْقَاء
- Community
- A view of Al Warqa town centre
- Interactive map of Al Warqaa
- Coordinates: 25°11′30.55″N 55°24′29.41″E
- Country: United Arab Emirates
- Emirate: Dubai
- City: Dubai

Area
  - Total: 21.6 km^{2} (8.3 sq mi)

Population (2018)
  - Total: 59,111
  - Density: 2,740/km^{2} (7,090/sq mi)
- Community number: 421–425

Al Warqa (Arabic: ٱلْوَرْقَاء, Al-Warqāʾ), sometimes spelled Al Warqa`a or Al Warqaa, is a locality in Dubai, the U.A.E. Located southeast of Dubai Creek, Al Warqa is bordered to the north by Mirdif, the west by Nad Al Hammar- Awir and the south by Warsan or International City.

== Geography and history ==
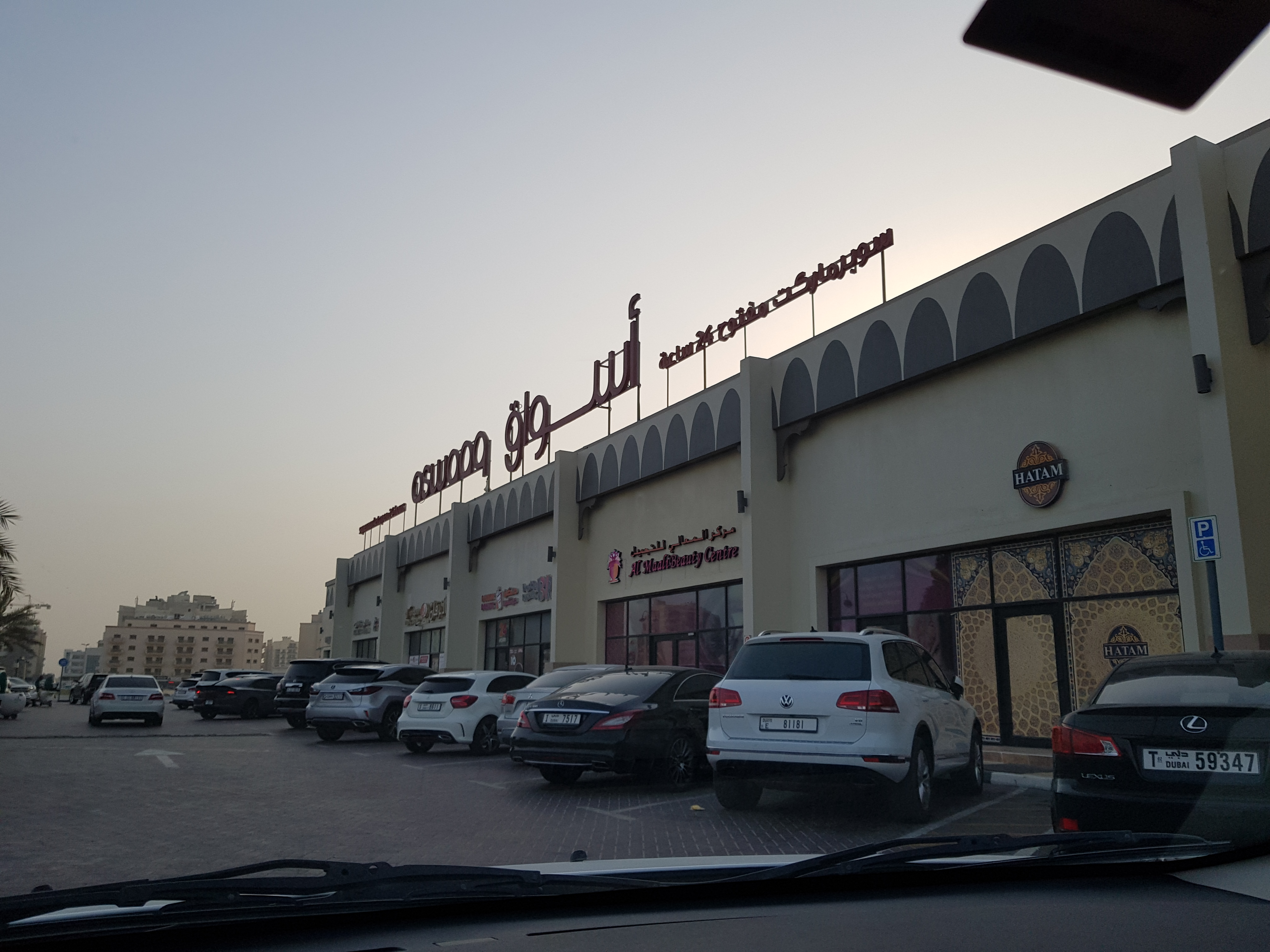
Aswaaq Mall in Al Warqa 2

The routes E 311 (Emirates Road) and E 44 (Al Awir Road) form the western and southern peripheries of Al Warqa. Once a sparsely populated industrial locality close to Dubai city limits, Al Warqaa is now experiencing considerable growth due to the development of International City and other real estate projects near the area. Al Warqaa is divided into subcommunities, from Al Warqa 1 to Al Warqa 5.

Landmarks in Al Warqaa include Dubai Municipality garbage disposal centre, Aswaaq Mall and Al Warqa Grand Mosque.

In 2001, as part of Dubai's rapid urban expansion, Al Warqa was officially established as a planned residential area with the launch of Al Warqa 1 and Al Warqa 2. These initial phases introduced structured road networks, modern villas, public schools, and municipal services to accommodate the growing population. Over the following decade, the area continued to evolve with the addition of Al Warqa 3, 4, and 5, alongside the development of public parks, mosques, healthcare centers, and retail outlets.

== Schools ==
- Sharjah American International School (Dubai Campus)
- Our Own English High School for Girls (Al Warqa 1)
- Our Own High School for Boys (Al Warqa)
- Primus Private School (Al Warqa 1)
- Ignite School (Al Warqa 1)
- International Academic School (Al Warqa 1)
- Cedar School (Al Warqa 1)
- International School of Arts and Science (Al Warqa 1) - Closed as of July 4, 2021
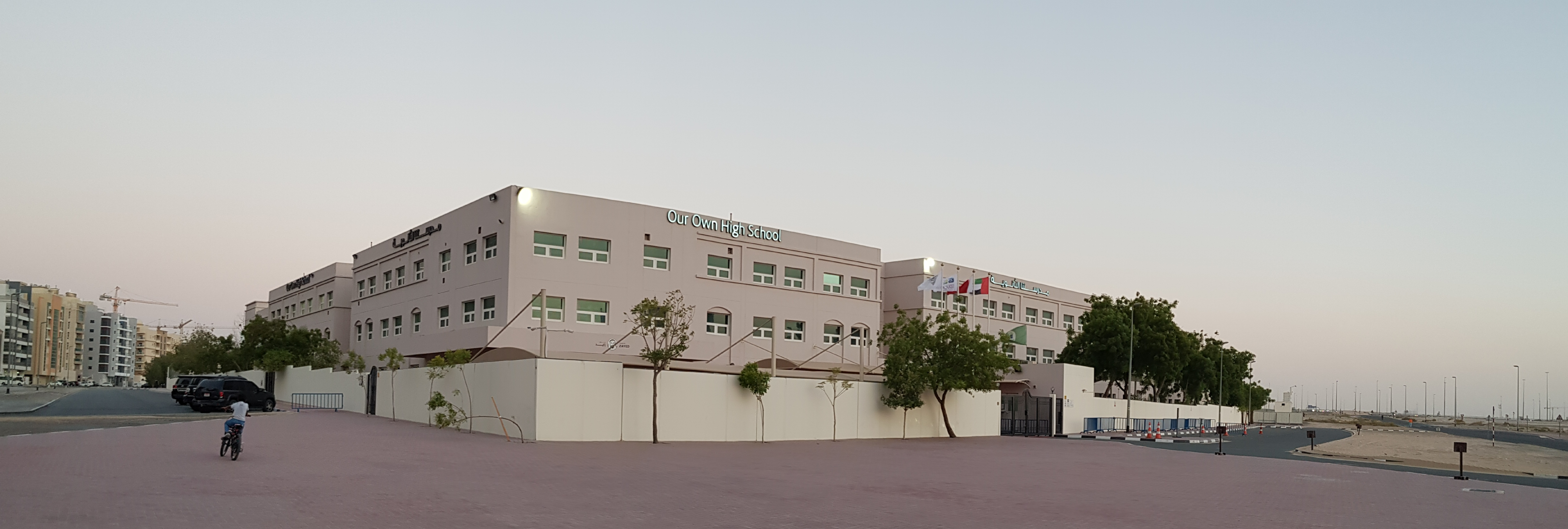
Our Own High School, Al Warqa

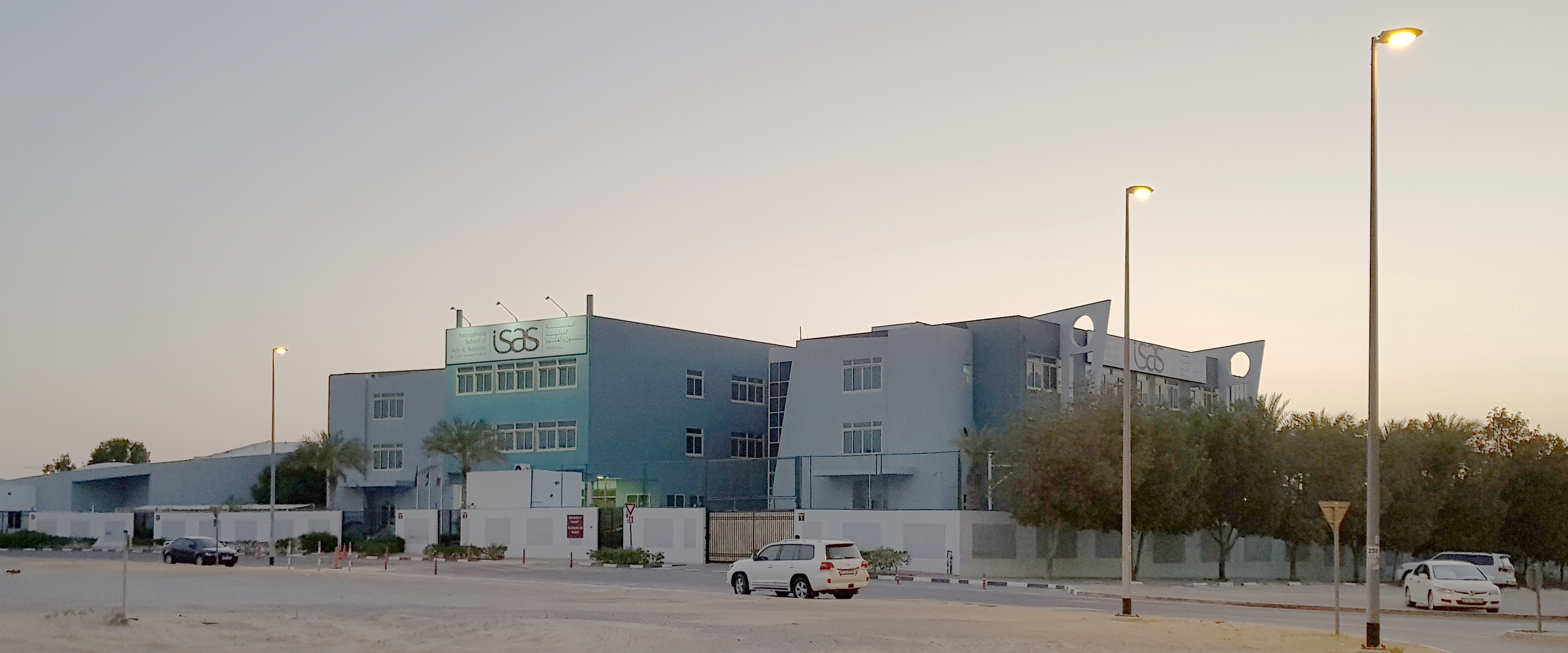
International School of Arts and Science

== Parks ==
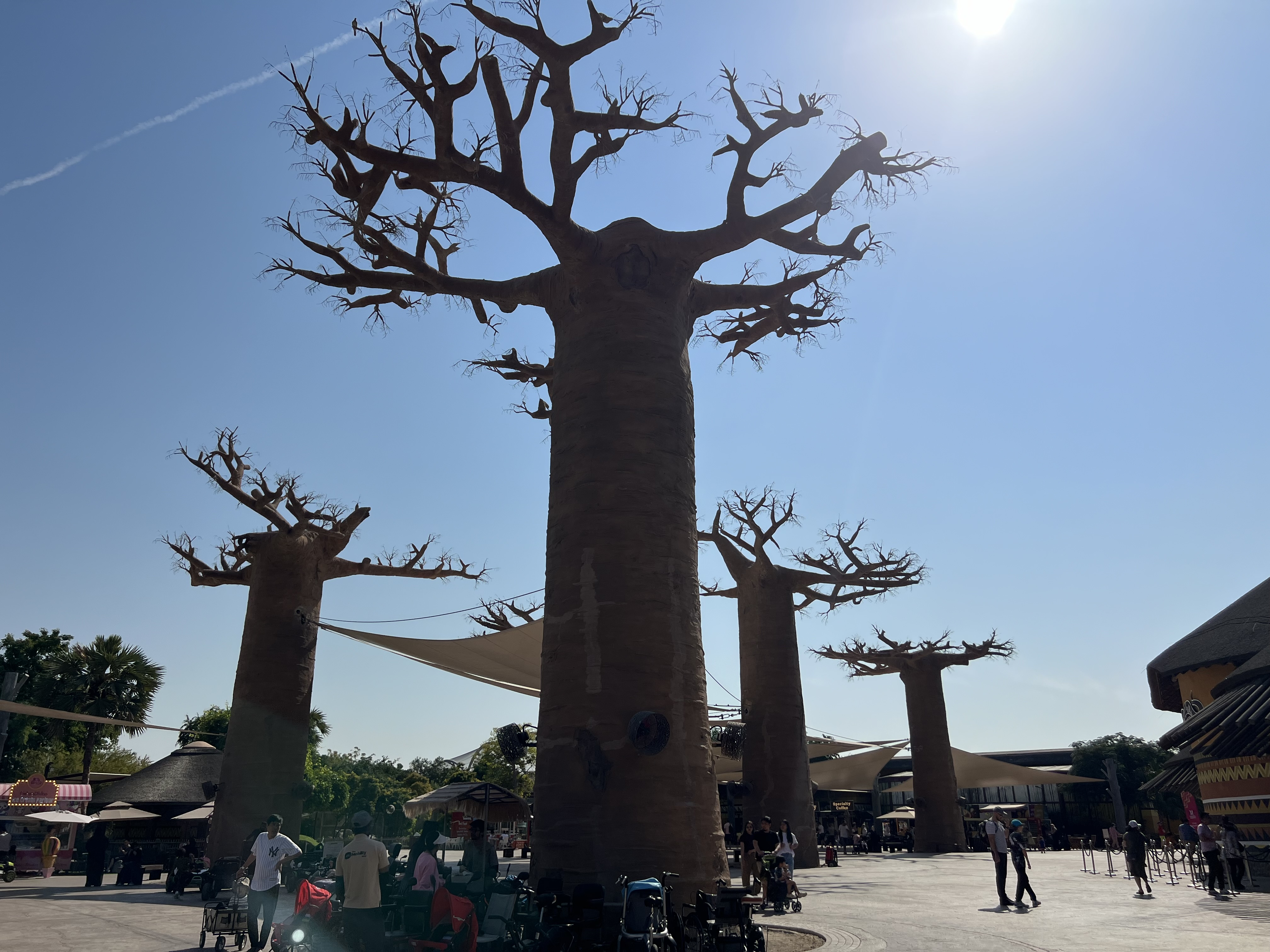
The biggest animal park in UAE, situated in Al Warqa 5

Al Warqa has three parks in its vicinity. Mushrif Park borders Warqa although it is located in Mushrif. Another park recently opened was constructed at a cost of Dh22 million, on 27.1 ha (67 acres) at Al Warqa 3, with recreational, sports and service facilities such as a 3.5 km running track, a 3.55 km (2.21 miles) cycle track, a 3.5 km sandy track, two football fields planted with natural grass, and basketball and tennis courts.

Al Warqa 2 has its own park. The total area of the park is 1.7 hectares. It has areas for children to plays, sandy areas for ball games for adults, a synthetic jogging track and other buildings and services.

A larger safari park, Dubai Safari Park, constructed in Al Warqa 5 on Aweer Road on an area of 400 hectares, includes a safari park, butterfly park, golf courses, entertainment and recreational areas. It replaced the ailing Dubai Zoo. 2,500 animals of around 250 species were relocated to the new site.

== Religious sites ==
Al Warqa Grand Mosque (Arabic: جَامِع ٱلْوَرْقَاء ٱلْكَبِيْر, romanized: Jāmiʿ Al-Warqāʾ Al-Kabīr; 25°11′32.96″N 55°24′31.23″E) is styled after the Prophet's Mosque in Medina, western Saudi Arabia.

The Grand Mosque of Al Warqa
