= STS Group (Dubai) =

School bus transportation company based in Dubai

Coordinates: 25.14582°N 55.22372°E

- Industry: Transport
- Founded: 2008, in Dubai, the United Arab Emirates
- Headquarters: Dubai, United Arab Emirates
- Area served: Gulf Cooperation Council
- Key people: Steve Burnell (managing director)
- Number of employees: 4,500
- Website: https://sts-group.com/

STS Group, also known as the School Transport Services Group, is a Dubai-based organisation offering transportation and mechanic services in the GCC region. The organisation predominantly serves school transportation for private schools in the United Arab Emirates, and is one of the biggest school bus operators in the country.

== Transportation ==
The group transports 80,000 students daily in the United Arab Emirates, in a fleet of over 2,500 buses. The Operations Control Center for the group functions as the central operational hub, with each bus being equipped with internal and external video surveillance to monitor passenger behaviour. The group mainly operates for schools under GEMS Education, with each bus holding an adult driver and either male or female nanny. Each bus has a GPS tracking system. In 2025, the company launched the Middle East's first fully electric bus fleet, powered by biofuel, which will debut in August 2025 at GEMS School of Research and Innovation.

== Charity work ==
In 2023, the company organised the Stuff the Bus with Hope campaign in collaboration with the Bring Hope Humanitarian Foundation, a non-profit focusing on refugees and displaced people across the Middle East, Africa and Asia. The campaign encouraged donations of items such as toys, clothes, stationary and more, with it receiving 1,200 donations on the first day.

== Awards ==
The company won the Innovation Products Award at the 2020 GESS Education Awards. The organisation received the Dubai Chamber CSR Label from 2016-2022.
