= Umm Ramool =

Umm Ramool أم رمول
- Community
- Interactive map of Umm Ramool
- Coordinates: 25.23150°N 55.36963°E
- Country: United Arab Emirates
- Emirate: Dubai
- City: Dubai
- Area: Al Rashidiya

Area
  - Total: 3.61 km^{2} (1.39 sq mi)

Population (2000)
  - Total: 4,629
  - Density: 1,280/km^{2} (3,320/sq mi)

Umm Ramool (Arabic: أم رمول) is a locality in Dubai, United Arab Emirates (UAE). It is located in Deira in eastern Dubai and is bordered to the north by Dubai International Airport, to the east by Nad Shamma, to the west by Al Garhoud and to the south by Ras Al Khor. Umm Ramool is a residential and commercial community.

Umm Ramool is one of the oldest industrial areas in Dubai. The area was connected to the Dubai Metro Red Line with the opening of the Emirates Station on 30 April 2010. The station is connected to the Emirates Office Building.
