= Sunny Varkey =

Indian entrepreneur and businessman

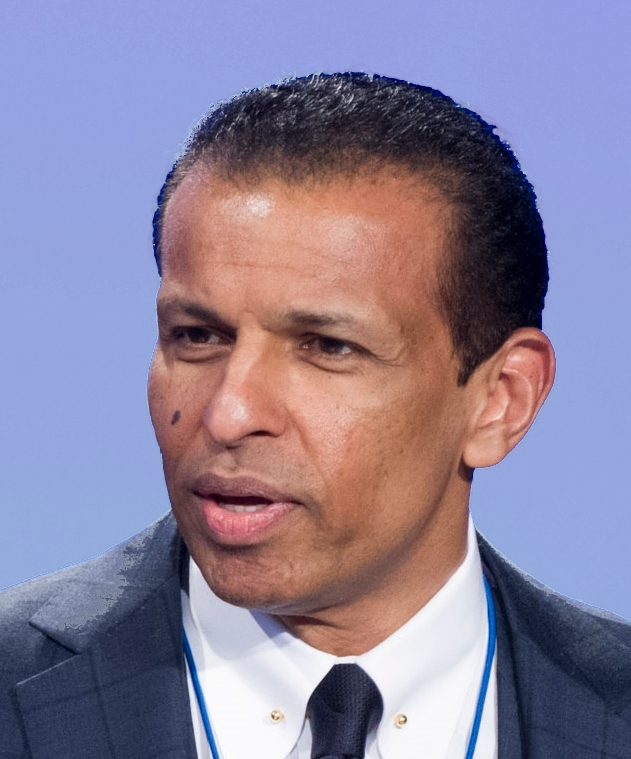
- Varkey in 2015
- Born: 9 April 1957 (age 69); Ranni, Kerala, India
- Occupations: Entrepreneur; Educationist; Philanthropist
- Known for: GEMS Education; Varkey Foundation
- Children: 2

Sunny Varkey (born 9 April 1957) is an Indian education entrepreneur and philanthropist based in Dubai. He is the founder and executive chairman of the global advisory and educational management firm GEMS Education, which is the largest operator of private kindergarten-to-grade-12 schools in the world, with a network of over 80 schools in over a dozen countries.

He is also the chairman of the umbrella business organisation the Varkey Group, and the founder and trustee of the philanthropic Varkey Foundation. As of 2012, Varkey is also a UNESCO Goodwill Ambassador. And in June 2015, Varkey committed to The Giving Pledge, vowing to donate at least half of his money to philanthropic causes over his lifetime. He is the first education entrepreneur to join the pledge.

According to Forbes, Varkey is one of India's richest billionaires with a net worth of $3.5 billion.

== Early life and education ==
Varkey was born in Ranni, Kerala, India in 1957. His father, K. S. Varkey, and mother, Mariamma, were Kerala Syrian Christians, and educators. The family moved to Dubai in 1959, when the emirate was still very undeveloped. His father worked for the British Bank of the Middle East (now called HSBC Bank Middle East), and both of his parents taught English to local Arabs, including members of the royal family.

At the age of four, Sunny was sent back to Kerala to attend Infant Jesus Anglo-Indian Boys' School, a Catholic boarding school in Kollam city. When he was 11 years old, he sold fruit on the side of the road to make a little extra money. He and his elder sister returned to Dubai in 1970, and Sunny completed his O-Levels at St. Mary's Catholic High School. He pursued his A-Levels at Bembridge School in the UK for a year, and completed his A-Levels in Dubai at the British Council.

== Career ==
=== GEMS Education ===
Varkey's parents founded Our Own English High School in Dubai in 1968. Varkey returned to Dubai in 1977, and his employment included work at Standard Chartered bank, opening a small trading company and a maintenance company, becoming part owner of the Dubai Plaza Hotel, and entering the healthcare industry.

When in 1980 local authorities insisted that his parents' Our Own English High School be housed in a purpose-built facility, Varkey took over the operation of the school, which had under 400 students at the time. He dropped his other businesses, expanded the school, and added new schools as well. The education situation in Dubai was ripe for expansion, since local schools were only for native Arabs, and the children of the ever-increasing number of expats needed education of their own. Varkey opened Indian, Pakistani, and British schools, and offered education under the different curricula: Indian (CBSE and ICSE), U.S., British, and later International Baccalaureate.

In 2000, Varkey established Global Education Management Systems (GEMS), an advisory and educational management firm, in advance of his worldwide overseas expansion. In 2003, he began opening GEMS schools in England and elsewhere.

=== Varkey Foundation ===
In December 2010, Varkey consolidated and structured his various donations and charitable initiatives by creating the Varkey Foundation (initially the Varkey GEMS Foundation) as the philanthropic arm of GEMS. The foundation intends to impact 100 impoverished children for every child enrolled at GEMS schools, via enrolment and education-access initiatives, worldwide teacher training programs, advocacy campaigns, and physical projects such as building classrooms, schools, and learning centres. Bill Clinton launched the foundation.

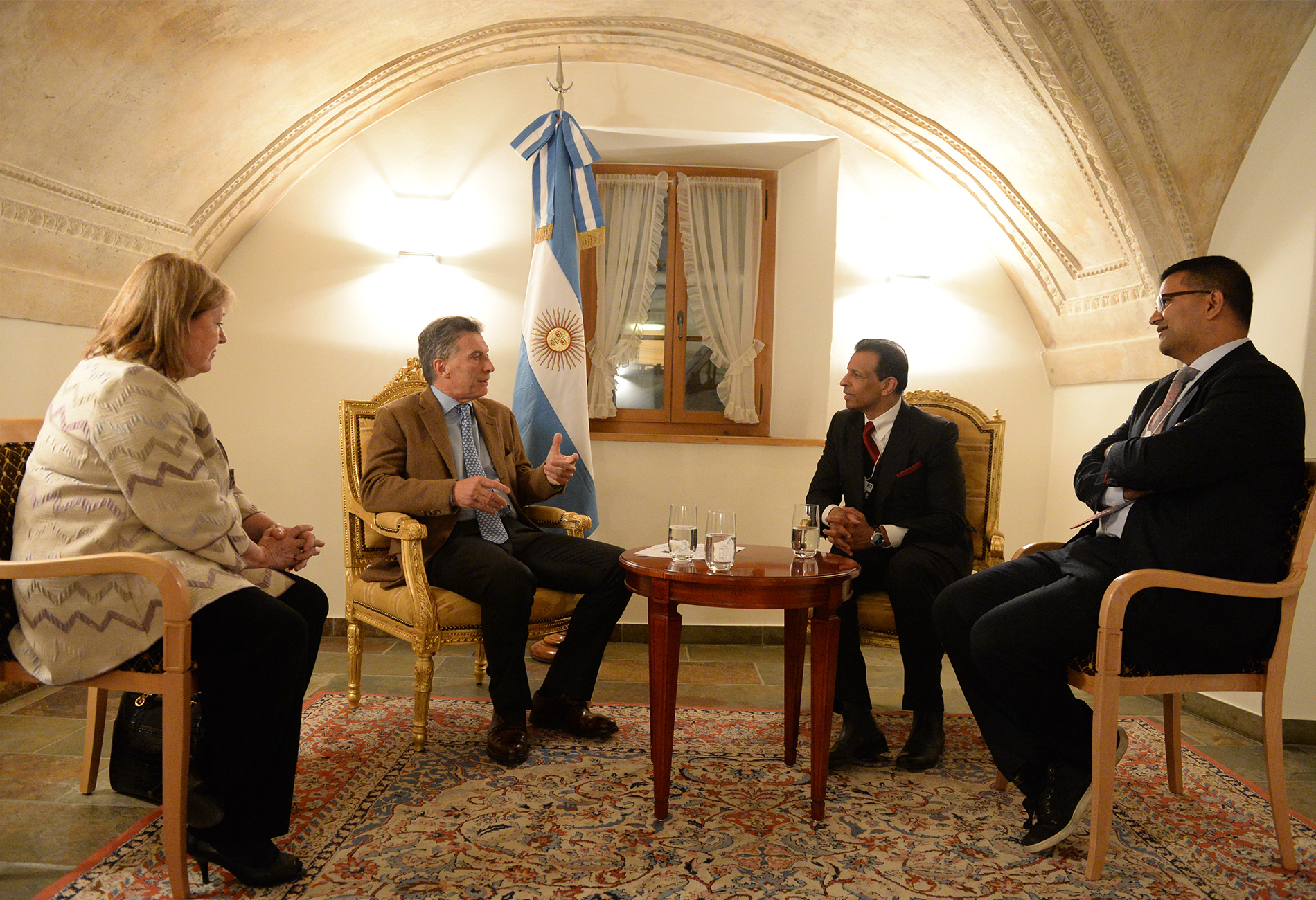
Argentine president Mauricio Macri met with Varkey (third from left) at the World Economic Forum in 2016.

In March 2011, the foundation partnered with UNESCO for girls' education in Lesotho and Kenya, and donated $1,000,000 to the effort. In September 2011, a further $1 million was pledged with UNESCO to train 10,000 school principals in India, Ghana, and Kenya. In 2014, the foundation's Teacher Training Programme committed to train 250,000 teachers within 10 years in under-served communities across the world.

In 2013, the Varkey Foundation helped launch the annual Global Education and Skills Forum, in partnership with UNESCO and the U.A.E. Ministry of Education. Bill Clinton gave the inaugural keynote address. At the second annual forum in March 2014, Varkey announced the Global Teacher Prize, a $1 million award to an exceptional teacher who has made an outstanding contribution to the profession, to be presented at the third annual GESF in 2015.

=== Varkey Group ===
Varkey Group is the umbrella organisation covering GEMS Education and Varkey's other businesses, including healthcare and, previously, construction. Varkey founded the company in 1979, and it is based in Dubai, with additional offices in the UK, U.S., and India.

In 1984 Varkey founded Welcare, a healthcare consultancy and management venture which developed a number of hospitals and clinics. A controlling interest in Emirates Healthcare, the Varkey Group's umbrella company which held Welcare, was purchased by Mediclinic International in 2012. The sale of his healthcare sector allowed Varkey to focus on education and educational philanthropy.

== Honors ==
- Global Indian Business Award (2007)
- CEO Middle East Award – Corporate Social Responsibility (2007)
- Outstanding Asian Businessman of the Year (2007)
- Rajiv Gandhi Award for Eminent Educationist (2008)
- Padma Shri Award (2009)
- Honorary Order – Public Recognition award from the Government of Russia (2011)
- Middle East Excellence CEO of the Year – Knowledge Development and Education Partnership (2012)
- UNESCO Goodwill Ambassador (2012)
- Education Business Leader of the Year, Gulf Business Industry Awards (2012)
- Honorary Doctorate, Heriot-Watt University (2012)
- Entrepreneur of the Year, The Asian Awards (2018)

== Personal life ==
Varkey lives in Dubai. He is married and has two sons, Dino and Jay, who have taken leadership roles in GEMS Education, allowing him to focus on his philanthropic foundation. Varkey's sister, Susan Mathews, runs pre-schools, and his wife and mother have both offered advice on the GEMS family business.
