= Dubai Sports City =

Multi-venue sports complex in Dubai, United Arab Emirates

- Interactive map of Dubai Sports City
- Full name: Dubai Sports City
- Location: Al Hebiah 4, Dubai, United Arab Emirates
- Coordinates: 25.0416°N 55.2194°E
- Owner: Dubai Sports City
- Operator: Dubai Sports City
- Capacity: 50,000,000 square feet of sport-integrated, master-planned development, 25,000 seating capacity for major events, 6,470,000 est square feet of office space

Construction
- Groundbreaking: 2004
- Opened: 2008

Tenants
- International Cricket Council; ICC Academy

Website
- www.dsc.ae

Dubai Sports City or DSC is a multi-venue sports complex in Dubai, United Arab Emirates, developed by Dubai. It is located in Al Hebiah 4. It provides a mix of residential, retail, leisure and recreational facilities. It is built around five major sports venues and features a number of sports academies. Located on Mohammad Bin Zayed Road, the residential aspect of the project consists of mid-rise apartment buildings, townhouses and villas. Sports City contains three distinct residential districts: Canal Residence, Victory Heights and Gallery Villas.

== Venues ==
Dubai Sports City contains the following sporting complexes:

- Dubai International Stadium, a 25,000 seat cricket stadium.
- ISD Dubai Sports City, a sports complex including football, athletics, tennis, padel and table tennis venues, hosting United FC (Dubai), a professional football team playing in UAE First Division League
- ICC Academy, Facilities include two full-sized (ICC Academy Ground & ICC Academy Ground No 2), one-day international floodlit ovals, alongside the ICC Academy's building and pitches, which offer indoor and outdoor training facilities. These include technology tools for bowlers and batsmen, practice pitches of different surfaces, and indoor nets. The ICC Academy is the only training complex anywhere in the world to offer South Asian, English and Australian practice turf.
- Rugby Park, a 5,000 seat rugby stadium. The newest sports initiative of Dubai Sports City, the Rugby Park provides facilities for players, coaches, referees, at all levels of the game. The Rugby Park in future will also boast a gymnasium, sports science and rehabilitation facilities as well as a sports medical clinic.
- The Els Club Golf Course is golf park. It is a world's first and is also the first golf course designed by Ernie Els in the Middle East.
- The DSC Indoor Arena is a multi-use indoor arena that was being built until construction stopped because of the late-2000s recession. Its planned use is mainly for basketball, tennis, ice hockey, and other indoor sports, as well as music concerts. It was due to open in 2009 with a seating capacity of 10,000 spectators.

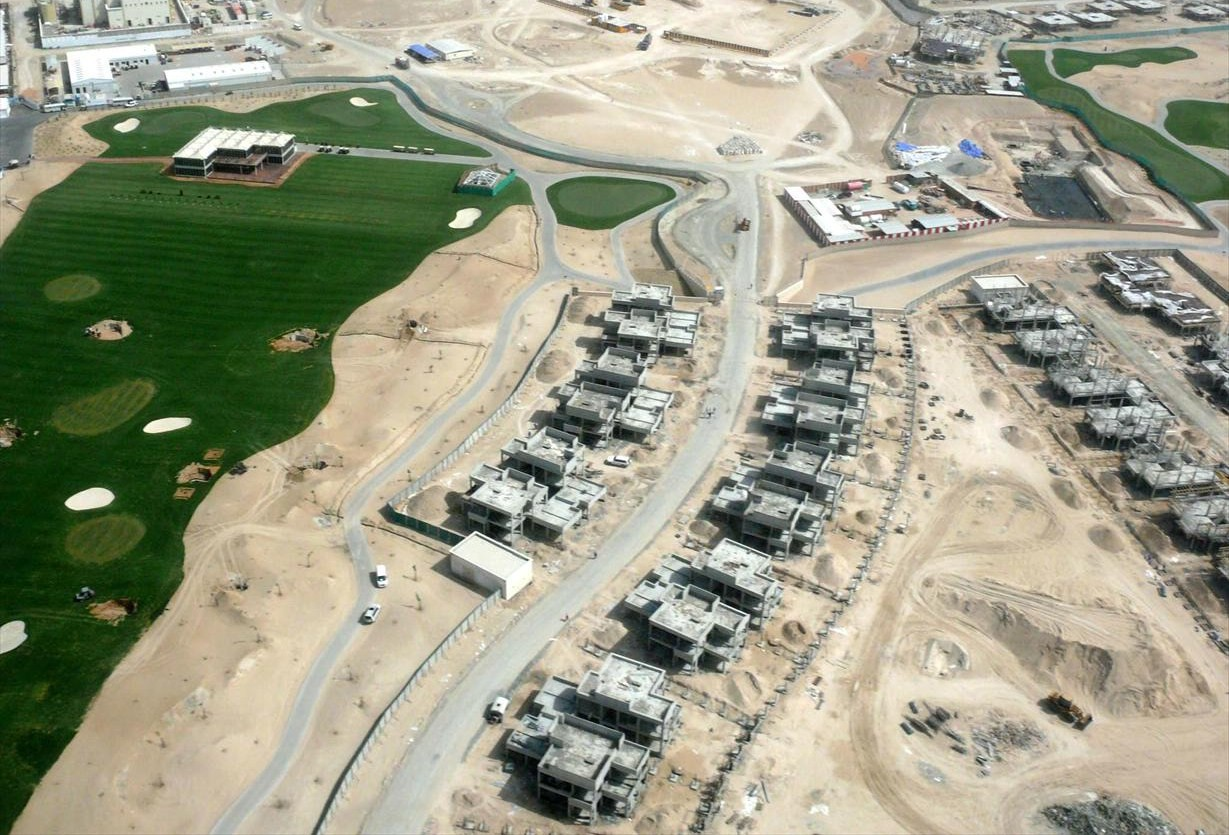
Dubai Sports City in May 2008

== Academies ==
- ICC Academy is a cricket academy which helps players, coaches, umpires, curators, and administrators focus on progress, training, and achievement.
- Real Madrid Educational Football Program (previously LaLiga Academy Dubai)
- United Football Academy - academy of United FC.
- Butch Harmon School of Golf is run by Butch Harmon who is widely regarded as one of the best golf coaches in the world.
- Danube Padel Academy is a padel academy at Danube Sports World offering training for players of all levels, with coaching from qualified coaches.
- Danube Cricket Academy offers indoor cricket training led by ICC-qualified coaches and technical experts, with programmes designed for different age groups.

== Residential towers ==
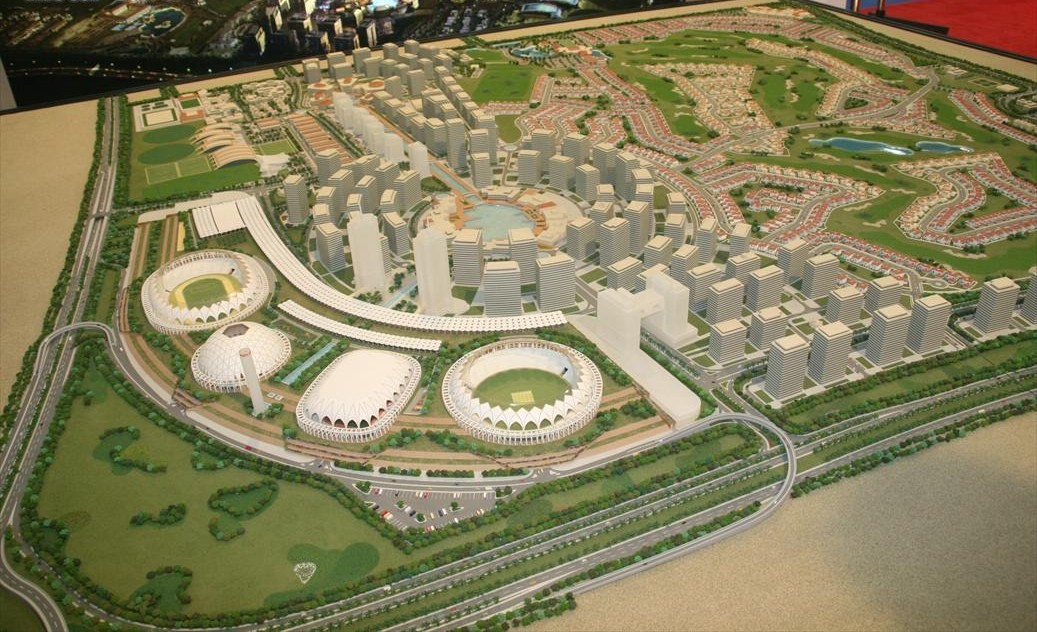
Model of Dubai Sports City

- Elite sports Residence Towers from 1 to 10
- Olympic Park Towers OP from 1 to 4
- Betslio Guncel Giris from 1 to 10

== Schools ==
- GEMS School of Research and Innovation
- Queen Elizabeth's School Dubai Sports City
- Dwight School
