= Sharjah American International School =

- مدرسة الشارقة الأمريكةالدولية الخاصة

Location
- Al Ramaqia; Sharjah, Emirate of Sharjah; United Arab Emirates
- Coordinates: 25.357121°N 55.460659°E

Information
- Other name: SAIS
- Type: Private international school
- Established: 1997
- Principal: Mr. Salah Jadayel
- Grades: K–12
- Website: www.saissharjah.com

Sharjah American International School (SAIS, Arabic: مدرسة الشارقة الأمريكية الدولية) is a K–12 private international school in Sharjah, Emirate of Sharjah, United Arab Emirates.

The school, located in Al Warqa, was established in 2005, and the SAIS family of schools has branches in 4 emirates - Sharjah, Dubai, Umm Al Quwain and Abu Dhabi. Dubai School is the second branch to be opened for SAIS schools. The school was officially opened in 2005 and offers classes from KG - to Gr. 12. It is an American curriculum school and started with 60 students and a small staff. The school building is located off the main Sharjah to Dubai highway - Sheikh Mohammed Bin Zayed Road - to the east of the city in the Mirdif/Al Warqa area. The school is situated on a large site with good outdoor space for several activities and sports programmes.

== See also ==
- Americans in the United Arab Emirates
- Education in the United Arab Emirates
