= GEMS Education =

Dubai-based education company

- Type: Education
- Founded: 2000; 26 years ago
- Founder: Sunny Varkey
- Headquarters: Dubai, United Arab Emirates
- Area served: Worldwide
- Key people: Sunny Varkey (Founder); Dino Varkey (CEO)
- Website: www.gemseducation.com

GEMS Education, founded as Global Education Management Systems (GEMS), is an international education company. It is one of the world's largest private school operators, and as of late 2022 it operates more than 60 schools across the Middle East and North Africa, and also has schools in Asia, Europe, and North America. Founded in Dubai by Sunny Varkey, the firm provides pre-school, primary, and secondary education.

== History ==
=== Early schools and the Varkey Group ===
GEMS Education had its roots in a family tutoring business in Dubai started by Indian-born teachers Mariama and K.S. Varkey in 1959. The discovery of oil in Dubai in 1966 brought in many foreign workers to the undeveloped emirate, including many from the Indian subcontinent. With the increased demand for an English-language education for the children of Indian expatriates, the Varkeys founded Our Own English High School in Dubai in 1968.

When in 1980 local authorities insisted that Our Own English High School be housed in a purpose-built facility, the Varkeys' son Sunny Varkey took over the operation of the school, which had fewer than 400 students at the time. He expanded the school, and added new schools as well. The education situation in Dubai was ripe for expansion, since local schools were only for native Arabs, and the children of the ever-increasing number of expats needed education of their own. Under his umbrella business organization the Varkey Group, Sunny Varkey opened Indian, Pakistani, and British schools, and offered education under the different curricula: Indian (Central Board of Secondary Education and Indian Certificate of Secondary Education), U.S., British, and later International Baccalaureate, French, and dual and local curricula.

In June 2024, SOFAZ (The State Oil Fund of Azerbaijan) announced it would invest US$100 million into GEMS education.

=== Founding of GEMS ===
After creating a network of schools in the Gulf Arab states, in 2000 Varkey established Global Education Management Systems (GEMS), an advisory and educational management firm, in advance of his overseas expansion. In 2003, he began opening GEMS schools in England, beginning with Sherborne House in Hampshire and Bury Lawn in Milton Keynes. Soon afterwards, he took over Sherfield School in Hampshire, and purchased another 10 schools in England, mainly in the north.

In 2004, the group opened its first schools in India. It continued to add schools in the subcontinent, and also purchased a controlling interest in the India-based Everonn Education, which the Varkey Group and GEMS managed. GEMS subsequently opened schools in Africa, Southeast Asia, the U.S., and Europe.

In 2010, the firm became an official member of the World Economic Forum (WEF) as one of WEF's Global Growth Companies. In 2012, it became a Global Growth Company 'Partner', entitling it to attend the World Economic Forum's flagship annual meeting in Davos. Also in 2010, former U.S. president Bill Clinton named GEMS Education a strategic partner of the Clinton Global Initiative, which convened global leaders to devise and implement innovative solutions to some of the world's pressing challenges.

In 2012, the firm received the School of Educators Global Education Awards' Lifetime Achievement Award for Global School Education. That year, it was also named Education Company of the Year at the Gulf Business Industry Awards, and it also received that same award in 2013.

== Structure and philosophy ==
The schools are established in various price brackets, to serve various markets and income levels. The more expensive schools have spacious grounds and amenities such as golf and tennis facilities, as well as smaller class sizes.

When entering into new markets, according to the company, its schools use local partners who understand local conditions, and provide local knowledge that may not be obvious through standard market research.

According to the company, its schools aim to instill students with universal values, and to form graduates who are global citizens with leadership qualities. The company states that the schools aim to equip children to live in a multicultural environment, and stresses the importance of giving back to others both locally and globally.

== GEMS Education Solutions ==
GEMS Education Solutions was the consultancy arm of GEMS Education, providing educational services and advice. It was established in 2011, taking on projects mainly in the UK, Africa, and Asia. It worked with governments and non-profits, and public and private clients.

One of its projects was assisting and advising the state school system in the United Arab Emirates. In Saudi Arabia, via the Oxford Partnership, it co-managed three newly built women's vocational colleges; the three-year diploma programmes include training in IT, communication, basic sciences, and English language, before moving on to specialisation and on-the-job training.

In Ghana, the consultancy implemented MGCubed – Making Ghana Girls Great – which equipped two classrooms in each Ghanaian primary school with a computer, projector, satellite modem, and solar panels, creating an interactive distance-learning platform to deliver formal in-school teaching and informal after-school training. The project initially taught 8,000 students in 72 Ghanaian schools, and was Sub-Saharan Africa's first interactive distance-learning project. The program aims to prevent dropping out and under-achieving among girls.

In 2014, GEMS Education Solutions published "The Efficiency Index", analyzing which public education systems, by country, deliver the best value for money. Basing its analysis on Programme for International Student Assessment (PISA) scores, the study also detailed teacher salaries and class sizes in nationwide schools. The study was analyzed in periodicals such as The Economist, Forbes, and BBC News.

== Corporate governance ==
Sunny Varkey is the founder of GEMS Education, and as of 2018, was its executive chairman. His elder son Dino Varkey has been CEO since 2017. As of 2018, Sunny's younger son Jay Varkey was an executive director and board member.

== Schools ==
=== Middle East and North Africa ===
==== United Arab Emirates ====
GEMS Education was founded in Dubai, and its first school there, Our Own English High School, originally opened in 1968. It was later renamed to GEMS United Indian School in 2015. The company still has its strongest presence in Dubai and in the United Arab Emirates. GEMS is the largest education provider in the UAE, and the UAE accounts for more than 90% of its business.

Following its initial years catering mainly to immigrant Indian workers, GEMS grew rapidly in Dubai. As the emirate developed into an international hub, the expat demographics shifted from short-term workers from a few countries to longterm expat residents with their entire families from countries around the world. The firm adapted with schools for each demographic, varying and adding new curricula and price ranges for each income level and nationality.

With steadily rising immigration, since public schooling was only available for Emirati natives, demand for private schools in Dubai and the UAE often outstripped supply, causing lengthy waiting lists at many schools. Many native Emiratis as well choose to send their children to private schools, and from 2011 to 2015 the number of native Emirati students in GEMS schools rose faster than any other nationality. Approximately 90% of students in Dubai were in private schools as of 2013, and with rapidly increasing population, private-school enrolment in Dubai doubled in the decade from 2003 to 2013.

As of 2012, GEMS schools overall in the UAE were reported to have had a general reputation for high-quality academic outcomes, outscoring national testing averages and out-performing originating counterparts in official international curricula examinations, and nearly all students continued on to university.

In December 2015, GEMS Education and the UAE Ministry of Education launched an annual UAE National Teacher Prize. The winner receives AED1 million, and the 21 top nominees train outside the country at some of the best educational institutions in the world. Winners of the prize, now called the Emirates Innovative Teacher Award, are announced annually in February at the Government Summit.

GEMS World Academy in Dubai, which opened in 2008, is the company's flagship school, and is one of the most expensive schools in Dubai. An International Baccalaureate school, its enrolment consists of approximately 2,000 students from more than 80 nationalities. It has extensive facilities for sciences, the arts, languages, sports, and dining.

Our Own English High School in Dubai, now exclusively for girls, had a 2014 enrollment of 10,000 and tuition that is approximately one-tenth that of GEMS World Academy (Dubai). As of 2014, it was the world's largest single-location girls school, and offered an Indian curriculum.

GEMS American Academy, Abu Dhabi opened in 2011. In 2015, a team of three students from the school competed at New York University's annual Digital Forensics Competition, along with 11 other teams chosen from over 800 teams around the world.

In 2012, Cambridge International School, Dubai was the only school in the UAE to be named by Microsoft as one of the Innovative Pathfinder Schools from around the world. In 2015 the school, which follows the English curriculum, was recognized as the top school for Arabic in Dubai, in the Education Perfect's global language-learning competition.

In 2016, GEMS Founders School Dubai (GFS) opened its doors in September 2016 to over 1800 students from FS1 – Year 8. This is the most successful school opening in GEMS Education history in terms of enrolment.

GEMS improved safety measures for bus transportation of students by the STS Group.

GEMS Our Own Indian School, Dubai developed GardenX, a digital garden and produce-management app built in collaboration with Falak.me, enabling the school community to track and order vegetables grown through on-campus hydroponic and aquaponic systems. Through this initiative, the school sold over 100,000 kg of fruits and vegetables in a single year, supporting sustainability education and community engagement.

In January 2025, GEMS Education announced that it would open GEMS School of Research and Innovation. The US$100M school will be the most expensive ever opened, and will have the highest fees of any school, when it opens in August 2025. The English curriculum school will specialise in Artificial Intelligence, and its facilities include an Olympics-standard 50M swimming Pool.

==== Elsewhere in MENA/WANA ====
In 2010, the firm took over the management of Kingdom Schools, a subsidiary of Kingdom Holding Company, in Riyadh, Saudi Arabia. The two school campuses, one for boys and one for girls, cover kindergarten through to high school and were established in 2000. The school caters to affluent, mainly Saudi families, and teaches a bilingual English-Arabic and international curriculum.

In 2012, GEMS opened The World Academy in King Abdullah Economic City (KAEC) in Saudi Arabia. It covers kindergarten through to high school, and was the new city's first school. It offers the International American curriculum leading to International Baccalaureate certification.

The company opened its first school in Qatar, GEMS American Academy, in September 2014. Located in Al Wakrah, and covering kindergarten through to high school, it offers an American curriculum based around the United States Common Core State Standards.

In the fall of 2015, the firm opened GEMS Wellington School–Qatar, in Al Wakrah. It features the English National Curriculum, and covers pre-school through to high school.

=== Europe ===
GEMS acquired and opened schools in England beginning in 2003. Most of its schools in the UK were independent coeducational day schools.

In the fall of 2003, it acquired Sherborne House in Hampshire – a school for ages 3–11 that was founded in 1933. It is sited on a four-acre campus, and in 2013 a new block of classrooms was added.

Also in the fall of 2003, the company acquired Bury Lawn School in Milton Keynes, northwest of London. The school had been founded in 1970 and was moved to its current site in 1987, and it caters to ages 3–18. In 2005, parents complained publicly following the departure of the fourth head teacher in two years; some parents had also objected to the increase in class sizes from 18 to 24 after GEMS acquired the school. GEMS subsequently withdrew from plans to sponsor two academies, or state-funded independent schools, in Milton Keynes. At Bury Lawn it added a new sports hall, music room, dance and drama studio, ICT lab, mathematics department, and four new science labs. In September 2011 the school was renamed after urban designer Melvin M. Webber, who was responsible for Milton Keynes' unique city layout, and it became the Webber Independent School, with a new head teacher and a new focus.

In 2004, the firm acquired the site for Sherfield School – the historic estate Sherfield Manor in Hampshire, set on more than 70 acres. The site had previously been a girls' boarding school, North Foreland Lodge, since 1947. GEMS started Sherfield School as a coeducational day school, and added boarding facilities in 2010 and 2015. The school covers ages 3 months to 18 years, and is an International Baccalaureate school.

In 2004, GEMS also acquired The Hampshire School, Chelsea in Chelsea, London. The school was founded by June Hampshire in Surrey in 1928, and moved to London in 1933. It is an independent co-educational day school for children between the ages of 3 and 13, and since 2009 has been housed in the historic Chelsea Library. The company had acquired The Hampshire School, Chelsea from Nord Anglia Education. At that time in 2004 GEMS acquired a total of 10 schools, seven of them in northern England, from Nord Anglia, which had re-focused on its nursery-school business. In 2007 GEMS announced the sale of Kingswood College in Lancashire to developers, citing the high costs of maintaining its premises, Scarisbrick Hall, a historic 19th-century Grade I listed building; local supporters purchased it and kept it open as a school. By July 2013 GEMS had sold all of its schools in the north of England. After class sizes dropped to less than half, GEMS also sold Bolitho School in Penzance in 2015; it had taken over the school in 2010 when it was in receivership and when pupil numbers were already in decline.

In 2013, the company set up GEMS Learning Trust, an education charity with academy-sponsorship status approved by the Department for Education, and established to run no-fee free schools and academies in the UK. It was sponsored by GEMS Education Solutions, the public-sector management and delivery arm of GEMS Education. Its Twickenham Primary Academy opened in September 2015 in Twickenham, Richmond upon Thames, London; beginning with Reception classes, it catered to children ages 4 to 11. Its Didcot Primary Academy, for nursery to age 11, opened in September 2016 in Didcot, Oxfordshire in a new development designed to accommodate the town's expanding population.

The firm's first school in continental Europe was the GEMS World Academy Switzerland, opened in the fall of 2013 in Etoy, Switzerland in the Lake Geneva. It opened in the fall of 2013 for students from pre-school through grade 12, and up to 1,000 students. It was an English-speaking school with an added emphasis on French, and catered to the international populace of the area as well as to local Swiss families seeking an international education for their children. The school closed in June 2019, and an agreement was reached with La Côte International School to ensure enrolment for the school's students.

In November 2013, GEMS Education acquired its first school in France, Ecole des Roches, a 60-acre international boarding school founded in 1899 in Normandy. The school, for students age 6 to 19, caters to a clientele from over 100 countries. It invested €5 million for a five-year large-scale expansion, redevelopment, and modernization of the school. 2014 was the first year of GEMS operation of the school, and it announced an intention to double or triple Ecole des Roches's 400-student boarding and day enrolment over five years. The school offers a combination of the English and French curriculums. As of 2015, it also offered French immersion courses for international students during the summer, French-immersion exchange programmes throughout the year, and summer English courses.

=== India ===
GEMS International School in Gurgaon, Haryana opened in 2010.

GEMS Modern Academy in Kochi, Kerala opened in 2019. The school is set in an 8.3-acre campus in Smart City and offers an International Baccalaureate syllabus as well as the Cambridge curriculum.

=== United States ===
In the fall of 2012, GEMS Education opened its first school in the United States, Little GEMS International-Chicago, a pre-school in Chicago's Lincoln Park neighborhood, for ages six weeks to five years.

Also in Chicago, in 2014 the company opened GEMS World Academy-Chicago, an International Baccalaureate school located in Chicago's Lakeshore East development. A preschool to eighth grade building opened in 2014, with an upper school for grades nine through 12 scheduled to open in 2017. In 2014, the school instituted a citywide $50,000 GEMS Education Chicago Teacher Award.

In 2013, the company sought a location to build a school on the Upper East Side of New York City; proceedings were eventually abandoned amidst litigation relating to property contracts.

In the early 2010s, the firm's consultancy arm, GEMS Education Solutions, partnered in managing some U.S. schools. In 2009 Manny Rivera, at the time CEO of GEMS Education Solutions and GEMS Americas, formed Global Partnership Schools with former New York City Schools Chancellor Rudy Crew. Global Partnership Schools, in partnership with GEMS Education Solutions, and financed by newly available three-year federal School Improvement Grants (SIG), managed some previously failing schools in the U.S. beginning in 2010. Results, as with many SIG recipients from 2010 to 2012, were mixed; in August 2012, the company declined to renew its contract with one school district. The combined partnership company also sponsored two new charter schools in Ohio called Believe to Achieve Academies beginning in the fall of 2012; they closed in late June 2014 due to inability to meet enrollment goals.

=== Sub-Saharan Africa ===
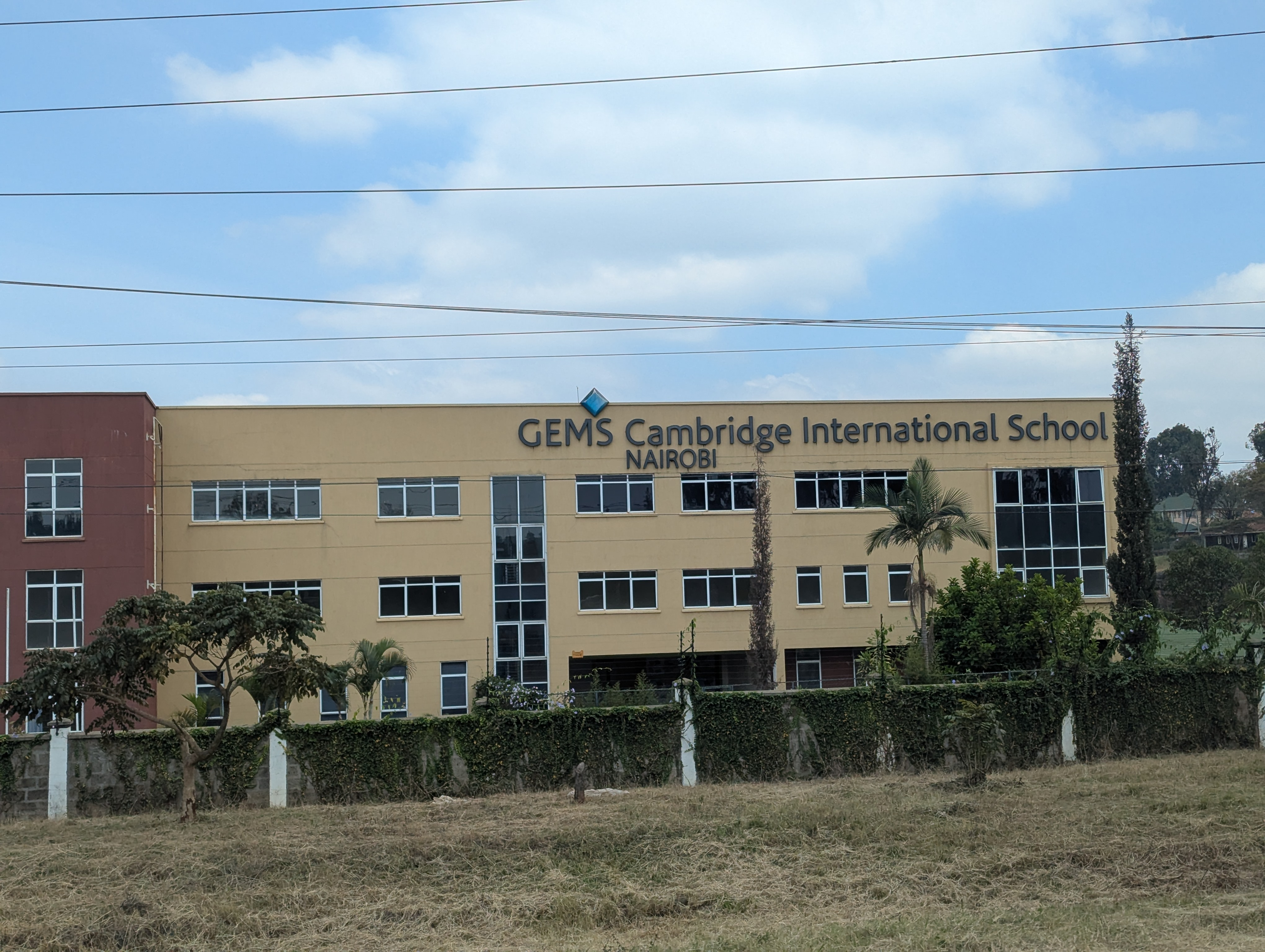
GEMS Cambridge International School Nairobi

The company opened its first school in sub-Saharan Africa in Kenya – GEMS Cambridge International School in Nairobi – in September 2012. The school's capacity was 2,000 students, including boarders, from kindergarten through year 13. It offered the National Curriculum for England, and IGCSE exams and A-levels.

GEMS Cambridge International School in Uganda opened in 2013 in Kampala. It served pupils ages 3 to 18, with the English curriculum geared toward IGCSE, AS-level, and A-level qualifications.

In 2019, the firm acquired the Nairobi-based Hillcrest International Schools. GEMS sold the schools in 2022 and exited the Kenyan market in 2023.

=== Southeast Asia ===
The company operated GEMS World Academy (Singapore), its first school in Southeast Asia, from September 2014 to June 2021. It is now operated by TPG Capital–backed XCL Education as the XCL World Academy, after its acquisition from GEMS.

In 2015, the firm opened GEMS International School Pearl City, in Penang, Malaysia. The school is for ages three to 18, and follows the English National Curriculum leading to the IGCSE/CIE and AS/A-level qualifications. It also accommodates the Malaysian Education Ministry guidelines and teaches Malaysian language, Mandarin, Malaysian social studies, and Islamic and moral studies. It was the first international school in Mainland Penang.

== Philanthropy ==
The owners run the Varkey Foundation, formerly known as the Varkey GEMS Foundation, as their family philanthropic arm.
