= GEMS School of Research and Innovation =

Private school in Dubai, the United Arab Emirates

Location
- Dubai Sports City; Dubai; United Arab Emirates
- Coordinates: 25.0357°N 55.2269°E

Information
- School type: Private independent school
- Patron saint: William Hague
- Established: 2025
- Founder: GEMS Education
- Authority: Knowledge and Human Development Authority
- Principal: James Monaghan
- Years offered: FS-1 - 13
- Gender: Co-educational
- Education system: English National Curriculum
- Campus type: Urban
- Athletics: Yes
- Nickname: SRI
- School fees: AED 116,000 - 206,000
- Website: www.gems-sri.com

GEMS School of Research and Innovation, also abbreviated to SRI, is a private school in Dubai Sports City, Dubai, following the National Curriculum for England. Following its opening in August 2025, it became the most expensive school in the country.

== History ==
The school campus is located in Dubai Sports City, Dubai, the United Arab Emirates, covering 47,600 square metres. It was built at a cost of around USD 100 million (AED 367 million). The school opened in August 2025. School fees range from AED 116,000 (USD 31,500) in foundation stage to AED 206,000 (USD 56,000) in Year 13. It has been referred to as the most expensive school in Dubai. The school offers the English National Curriculum. William Hague, a former United Kingdom Foreign Secretary and current Chancellor of the University of Oxford, is set to serve as the honorary patron of the school. The founding and current principal is James Monaghan, formerly a principal for North London Collegiate School in Dubai and South Korea. Sebastian Coe, a two-time Olympic gold medalist, is set to be the sports advisor to the school.

== Facilities ==
The school's facilities include a helipad, 600-seat auditorium, a 400 meter running track, a football field, and a swimming pool certified by World Aquatics.
