= Al Rashidiya =

Al Rashidiya الراشدية
- Community
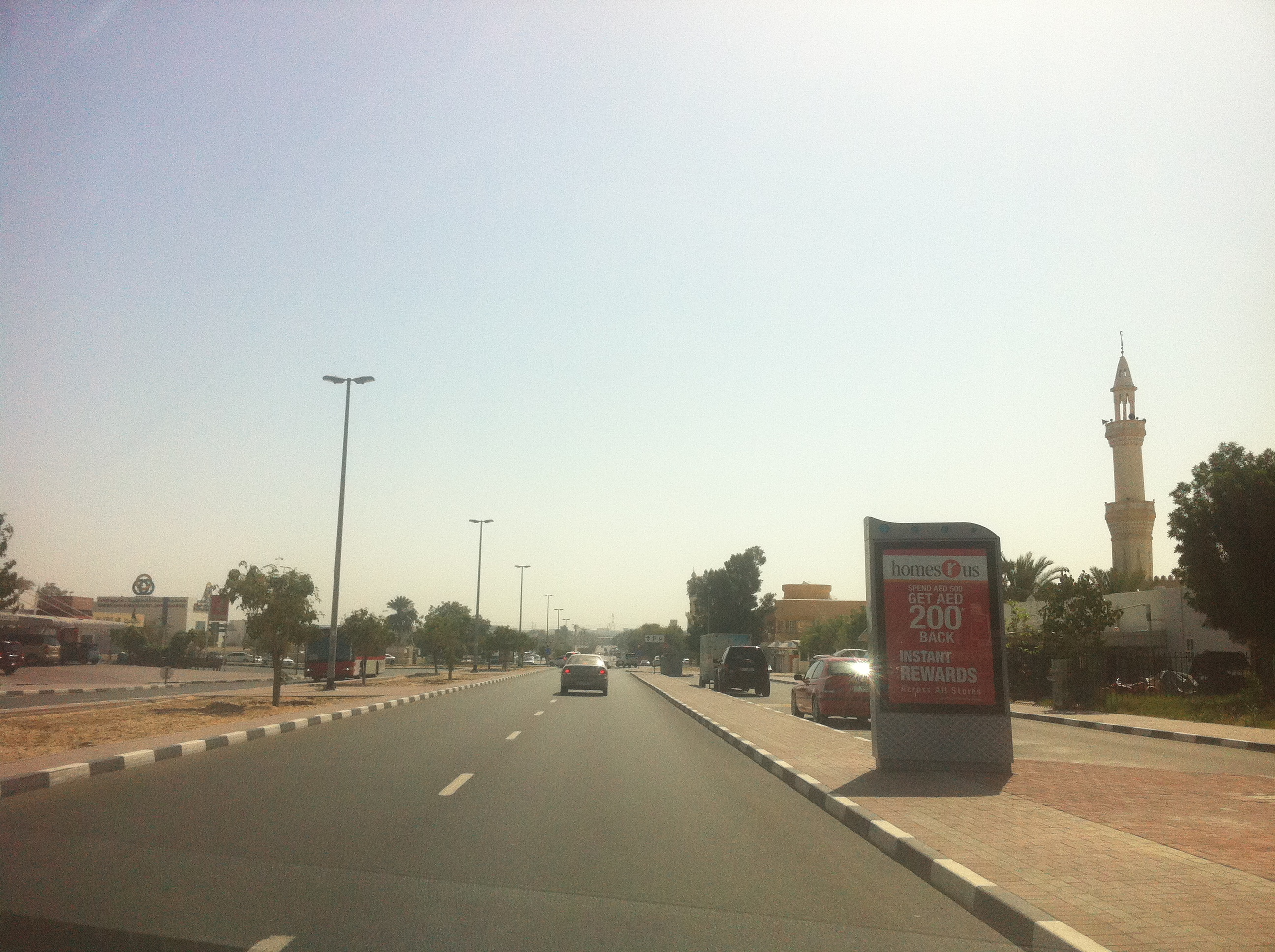
- Rashidiya Grand Mosque, a night view
- Interactive map of Al Rashidiya
- Coordinates: 25.22746°N 55.39144°E
- Country: United Arab Emirates
- Emirate: Dubai
- City: Dubai

Area
  - Total: 4.41 km^{2} (1.70 sq mi)

Population (2022)
  - Total: 38,408
  - Density: 8,710/km^{2} (22,600/sq mi)
- Community number: 216

Al Rashidiya (Arabic: الراشدية) is a locality in Dubai, United Arab Emirates (UAE). Al Rashidiya is located south of Dubai International Airport in Deira, the eastern region of Dubai. The locality is bounded to the north by route D 89 (Al Khawaneej Road), the west by route D 62 (Nad Al Hammar Road) and the east by route E 311 (Emirates Road). A local street, "201 Road", separates Al Rashidiya from the locality of Nad Al Shamma.

Al Rashidiya borders Dubai International Airport to the north, Umm Ramool to the west, Nad Al Shamma to the south and Mirdif to the east. Local roads in Al Rashidiya follow a grid plan, with even-numbered roads running northeast–southwest, and odd-numbered roads running northwest–southeast. Al Rashidiya shares the local road addressing system with the locality of Nad Al Shamma.

Important landmarks in Al Rashidiya include Al Rashidiya Park, Nad Al Shamma Park, Rashidiya Grand Mosque and Bin Sougat Shopping Mall. Al Rashidiya is a relatively wealthy neighbourhood of expatriates and Emiratis. The locality is dotted with independent villas and town homes. Dubai's Airport Tunnel, part of which connects Al Rashidiya to Al Qusais, was the longest tunnel in the Middle East when it was built. The tunnel is 1.6 km (0.99 mi) long and cost Dh. 686 million (US$ 190 million).
