= Nad Al Hammar =

Nad Al Hammar ند الحمر
- Community
- Interactive map of Nad Al Hammar
- Coordinates: 25.19997°N 55.38483°E
- Country: United Arab Emirates
- Emirate: Dubai
- City: Dubai

Area
  - Total: 8.4 km^{2} (3.2 sq mi)

Population (2000)
  - Total: 2,563
  - Density: 310/km^{2} (790/sq mi)
- Community number: 416

Nad Al Hammar (Arabic: ند الحمر) is a locality in Dubai, United Arab Emirates (UAE). Nad Al Hammar is a small, residential and industrial community located in Dubai.

The routes E 311 (Sheikh Mohammed Bin Zayed Road) and E 44 (Ras Al Khor Road) form the eastern and southern peripheries of Nad Al Hammar. Nad Al Hammar is on the outskirts of Dubai city limits and has a small residential community. A Dubai Electricity and Water Authority (DEWA) substation is located in the southeast of Nad Al Hammar.
