= Our Own English High School =

School in the United Arab Emirates

Coordinates: 25°11′37.1″N 55°25′32.8″E

GEMS Our Own English High School, Dubai
- Dubai; Other Branches: Abu Dhabi; Al Ain; Fujairah; Al Warqa; Sharjah; United Arab Emirates

Information
- Motto: Lead Kindly Light
- Established: 1968
- Founder: K. S. Varkey
- School board: CBSE
- Principal: Thomas Mathew
- Grades: KG to Grade 12
- Language: English
- School fees: AED 7,648-16,182
- Website: www.gemsoo-dubai.com

Our Own English High School, Dubai (Arabic: جيمس مدر ستنا الثانوية الإنجليزية، دبي) is a private Indian school situated in Al Warqa, Dubai. It is one of the oldest schools in the city of Dubai, being founded in 1968. It is an Indian school following the CBSE curriculum. The first campus opened in Bastakia and moved to Oud Metha near St. Mary's Church in 1983. The school moved once again to its current location in Al Warqa. It is a mixed sex school until grade 4, and a girls only school from grades 5 to 12.

== Other branches ==
This school is a subsidiary of GEMS Education

- Our Own English High School, Al Ain
- Our Own High School, Al Warqa
- Our Own English High School, Fujairah (formerly)
- Our Own English High School, Sharjah
- Our Own English High School, Ras al-Khaimah

== Notable alumni ==
- Adhitya, actor
- Naeemuddin Aslam, cricketer
- Roshni Chopra, actress, television presenter, reality series winner
- Keba Jeremiah, musician
- Anjali Menon, filmmaker
- Parvati Nair, model
- Nazriya Nazim, actor
