= Reel Palestine =

- Location: Al Quoz, Dubai, UAE
- Founded: 2015
- Founded by: Cinema Akil
- Most recent: 11th Edition, February 2025
- Awards: Advanced Media Audience Award
- Language: Arabic, English
- Website: http://www.reelpalestine.org/

Reel Palestine (Arabic: ريل فلسطين) is an annual non‑profit film festival held in Al Quoz, Dubai, UAE that showcases independent Palestinian cinema through curated screenings of feature films, documentaries, and shorts. Founded in 2015 by a volunteer collective in the UAE, the festival aims to amplify Palestinian cultural narratives through cinema and engage audiences in cross‑cultural dialogue. Each edition takes place at Cinema Akil in Alserkal Avenue, Al Quoz, and often occurs during Quoz Arts Fest. Past editions have included pop‑up screenings in Sharjah and Abu Dhabi in collaboration with cultural institutions such as the Sharjah Art Foundation and Warehouse421.

Complementary events include filmmaker Q&A sessions, workshops, and the Reel Palestine Souk, which during the 2025 edition featured nearly 60 business stalls—from food and art to crafts—many sourced directly from Palestine or the UAE. In 2025, the festival launched its inaugural audience award at the end of the screening programme.

Reel Palestine is recognized for providing a platform to Palestinian filmmakers and stories that often fall outside mainstream distribution channels, fostering community around cinema and cultural exchange in the Gulf region.

== Programming and themes ==
The festival showcases a diverse range of genres and themes—from experimental shorts and coming-of-age dramas to archival documentaries and diasporic storytelling. Its programming reflects the plurality of Palestinian identity and often explores topics such as displacement, memory, resistance, and everyday life under occupation.

== Venues and partnerships ==
Reel Palestine's primary venue is Cinema Akil in Alserkal Avenue, Al Quoz, Dubai. The festival is also known for its traveling pop-ups across the UAE, including cities like Sharjah and Abu Dhabi, as well as collaborative events with institutions and cultural spaces in the Gulf region.

In addition to Cinema Akil, Reel Palestine has partnered with organizations such as Bristol, Palestine Film Foundation, Sharjah Art Foundation, and local arts foundations to facilitate educational and community-based initiatives.

== Editions ==
Reel Palestine has been held annually since its inception in 2015, typically taking place each January/February, often coinciding with Quoz Art Fest, at Cinema Akil in Dubai. Each edition features a curated program of feature films, documentaries, shorts, and panel discussions centered on Palestinian life and storytelling.

In 2021, in response to the COVID-19 pandemic, Reel Palestine launched the Home Edition, making a selection of its films available for streaming within the UAE. This pivot to digital access aimed to maintain audience engagement and broaden reach during a period of restricted public gatherings.

Each edition is accompanied by a Palestinian-inspired souq, featuring local and regional vendors offering crafts, books, food, and handmade goods that reflect the cultural heritage of Palestine.

Edition	Year	Date	Films
1	2015	January 16-25	Full Feature Films: Trip Along Exodus by Hind Shoufani | 2015 (Documentary) Giraffada by Rani Massalha | 2013 (Drama) My Love Awaits Me By the Sea by Mais Darwazah | 2013 (Documentary) Encounter With a Lost Land by Maryse Gargour | 2013 (Documentary) Open Bethlehem by Leila Sansour | 2014 (Documentary) Shorts: Suspended Time (9 Shorts by Palestinian Filmmakers) | 2014 Eid by Saaheb Collective | 2011 Ismail by Nora Sharif | 2012 Maqloubeh by Nicolas Damuni | 2012 Ramallah by Flavi Pinatel | 2014 A Sketch of Manners by Jumana Manna | 2015 No News by Eyas Salman | 2011 Pink Bullet by Ramzi Hazboun | 2014 Izriqaq by Rama Mari | 2013
2	2016	1	1
3	2017	1	1
4	2018	1	1
5	2019	1	1
6	2020	1	1
7	2021	1	1
8	2022	1	1
9	2023	1	1
10	2024	1	1
11	2025	1	1

== See also ==
- Cinema of the United Arab Emirates
- Cinema of Palestine
- Cinema Akil
- Arab cinema
- Alserkal Avenue
- Art in Dubai
