= Cinema Akil =

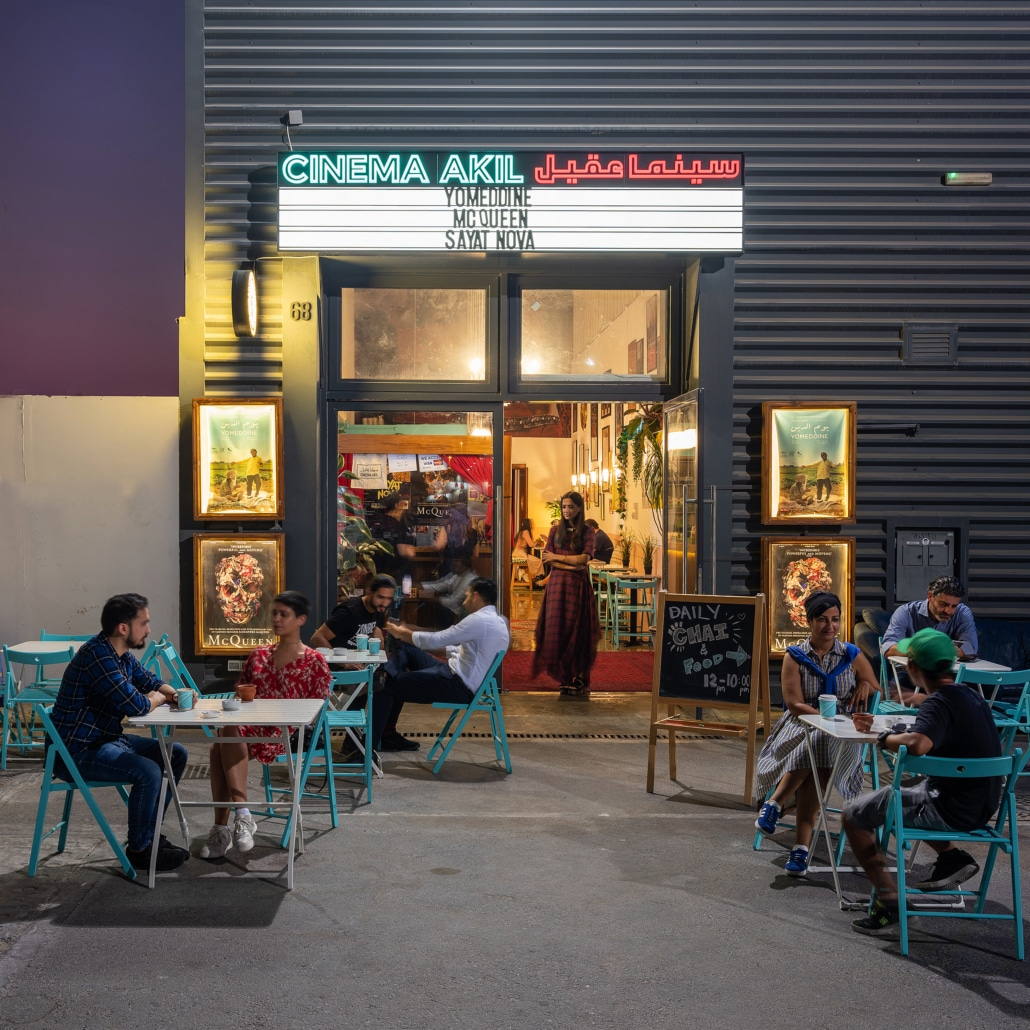
- Native name: سينما عقيل
- Industry: Entertainment (movie theater)
- Genre: Art Film
- Founded: June 24, 2014 (12 years ago)
- Founder: Butheina Kazim
- Headquarters: Alserkal Avenue, Al Quoz, Dubai, United Arab Emirates 25.1421548°N 55.2241697°E
- Number of locations: 2
- Website: cinemaakil.com

Cinema Akil (Arabic: سينما عقيل) is an independent arthouse cinema located in Al Quoz, Dubai, United Arab Emirates. Founded in 2014 by Butheina Kazim, it is the first arthouse cinema in the Gulf Cooperation Council (GCC) region. Cinema Akil specializes in screening independent, classic, and world cinema, with a curatorial focus on films that are not typically distributed in the commercial cinema circuit of the Middle East. It operates a flagship location in Alserkal Avenue, a satellite venue at 25hours Hotel One Central, and has hosted pop-up screenings across the Middle East, including in Sharjah, Abu Dhabi, Saudi Arabia, and Qatar. The cinema also serves as the main venue for regional film festivals such as Reel Palestine, Arab Cinema Week, and the FrancoFilm Festival.

Cinema Akil is a member of the Network of Arab Alternative Screens (NAAS), International Confederation of Art Cinemas (CICAE), International Documentary Association (IDA), and the Programmers of Colour Collective (POC2).

== History ==
Cinema Akil was established in 2014 as a nomadic cinema project, organizing pop-up screenings across various venues in the United Arab Emirates, including art galleries, cultural centers, and public spaces. The project aimed to introduce a wider audience in the region to global cinema and to create a platform for film as a medium of cultural discourse.

In September 2018, Cinema Akil inaugurated its first permanent location in Alserkal Avenue, a cultural district in the Al Quoz industrial area of Dubai. The space, designed to accommodate 133 viewers, was repurposed from an industrial warehouse and features vintage furnishings and a tea bar, Project Chaiwala, which serves South Asian-style street tea and snacks.

In 2022, Cinema Akil expanded its operations with a second venue at the 25hours Hotel One Central in Downtown Dubai.

== Mission ==
Cinema Akil's stated mission is to promote film literacy and appreciation in the Gulf region by providing access to independent and non-mainstream cinema. It seeks to foster cross-cultural dialogue, support regional filmmakers, and offer educational programming to diverse audiences.

== Programming ==
Cinema Akil's programming includes a wide range of international films, documentaries, retrospectives, and regionally produced works. The cinema regularly hosts thematic series and film festivals, often in collaboration with local and international cultural institutions.

Notable recurring events and collaborations include:

- Reel Palestine – An annual film festival showcasing Palestinian cinema.
- FrancoFilm Festival – A festival celebrating Francophone cinema in collaboration with Sorbonne University Abu Dhabi, and the Embassies of France, Switzerland, Canada, Luxembourg, and Belgium.
- Italian Film Festival, in collaboration with the Italian Cultural Institute in Abu Dhabi.
- Hong Kong Film Festival, in collaboration with the Asian Film Awards Academy.
- Arab Cinema Week, featuring contemporary films from across the Arab world.

Cinema Akil also organizes post-screening discussions, Q&A sessions with filmmakers, and educational screenings for students.

== Cultural impact ==
Cinema Akil is widely regarded as a pioneering institution in the Middle Eastern independent film scene. By offering a consistent venue for non-commercial film, it has played a significant role in cultivating a cinephile community in Dubai and the wider UAE. It also contributes to the broader discourse on cultural representation, identity, and artistic freedom in the Gulf region.

Its presence in Al Quoz aligns it with other contemporary art and culture spaces, contributing to the development of Dubai’s creative industries.

== Founder ==
Cinema Akil was founded in 2014 by Butheina Kazim, an Emirati media professional, cultural curator, and filmmaker. Born in 1984 in Manama, Bahrain and raised in Dubai, Kazim earned her undergraduate degree in design from the York University in Toronto. She later completed a Master’s degree in Media, Culture, and Communication at New York University as a Fulbright scholar. Prior to founding Cinema Akil, Kazim worked in media development and television production with the Arab Media Group and Dubai Media.

== See also ==
- Cinema of the United Arab Emirates
- Arab cinema
- Alserkal Avenue
- Art in Dubai
