= Dubai Hills Mall =

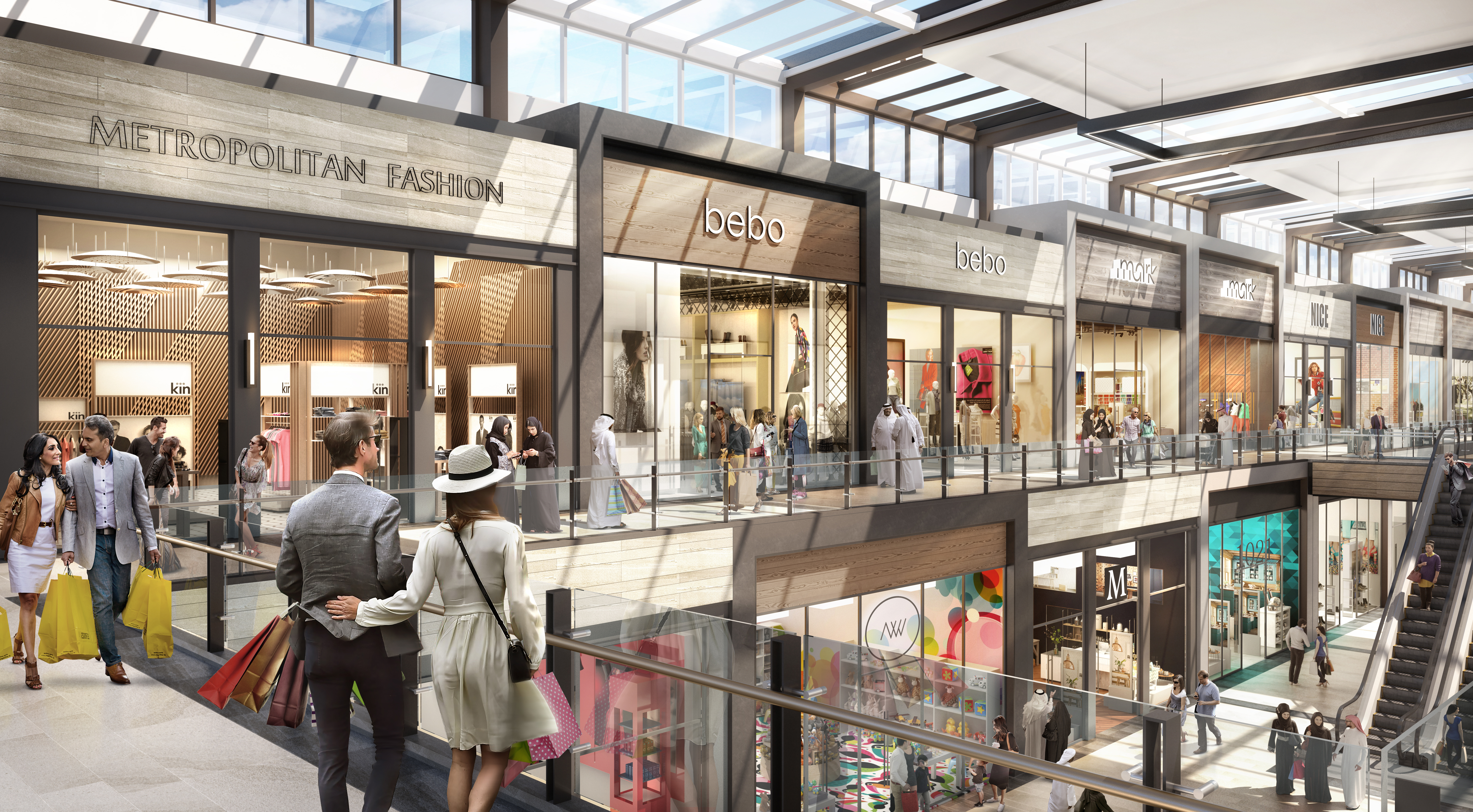
- Location: Dubai Hills, Dubai, United Arab Emirates
- Coordinates: 25.10125°N 55.23795°E
- Opened: 17 February 2022; 4 years ago
- Developer: Emaar Properties
- Num. of stores: 750
- Floor area: 2,000,000 sq ft (190,000 m^{2})
- Website: emaar.com

Dubai Hills Mall is a retail, leisure, and entertainment complex situated in Dubai, United Arab Emirates. Located in the Dubai Hills Estate, at an intersection between Al Khail and Umm Suqeim. Dubai Hills Estate constitutes as one of the first stages in the development of Mohammed bin Rashid City (MBR City) and Dubai Hills Mall will be the primary regional mall in the area. The mall opened on 17 February 2022.

== Background ==
Dubai Hills Mall is owned and operated by Emaar Malls, a subsidiary of Emaar Properties. Emaar Malls is responsible for the construction of The Dubai Mall, the largest shopping centre in the world by total area after The Avenues (Kuwait) mall it is considered to be one of the largest shopping malls in the world. Plans for the Dubai Hills Mall were announced in August 2017 and the completion date was planned for late 2019. It actually opened in 2022.

== Development ==
Upon completion, Dubai Hills Mall will encompass a gross leasable area of over 2,000,000 sq ft (190,000 m^{2}). This will be used as space for 750 retail and dining outlets. The mall will be accessible from Umm Suqeim Road and Al Khail Road. Dubai Hills Mall has mix of retail and also includes F&B, 'fast fashion' outlets and trendy cafes.

== Location ==
Dubai Hills Mall is situated in the development, Dubai Hills Estate. Within the immediate vicinity, there are numerous residential developments, an 18-hole championship golf course, Dubai Hills Park and Dubai Hills Boulevard. Its prominent road links, inclusive of Umm Suqeim Street and Al Khail Road, means it can be accessed from Downtown Dubai, Dubai Marina and the residential enclaves of Emirates Hills and Arabian Ranches.

== Features ==
=== Design ===
Current plans for the Dubai Hills Mall show that it will be based around a central courtyard, from which a series of interconnected streetscapes branch out. Its layout is designed to offer easy orientation and provide a clear focus on the central courtyard. This space will be used for events and special features in the future. The mall includes anchor retail experience stores and also parking spaces available for over 7,000 vehicles.

=== Retail ===
Dubai Hills Mall will consist of approximately 650 retail and dining outlets spread over two levels. Also scheduled for the space is a 63,500 sq ft (5,900 m^{2}), hypermarket and numerous department stores. Three ‘pocket parks’ are included in the design, providing space for dining facilities, leisure activities, and community events. A large skylight canopy will act as a projection screen for advertising purposes and during events.

=== Leisure ===
Dubai Hills Mall is one of the latest retail projects by Emaar. 4 major entertainment and leisure complexes are planned for construction, including a 17-screen cinema complex and an outdoor concert arena.

== See also ==
- Dubai Hills
- Emaar Properties
