= Abdelmonem Bin Eisa Alserkal =

Emirati businessman

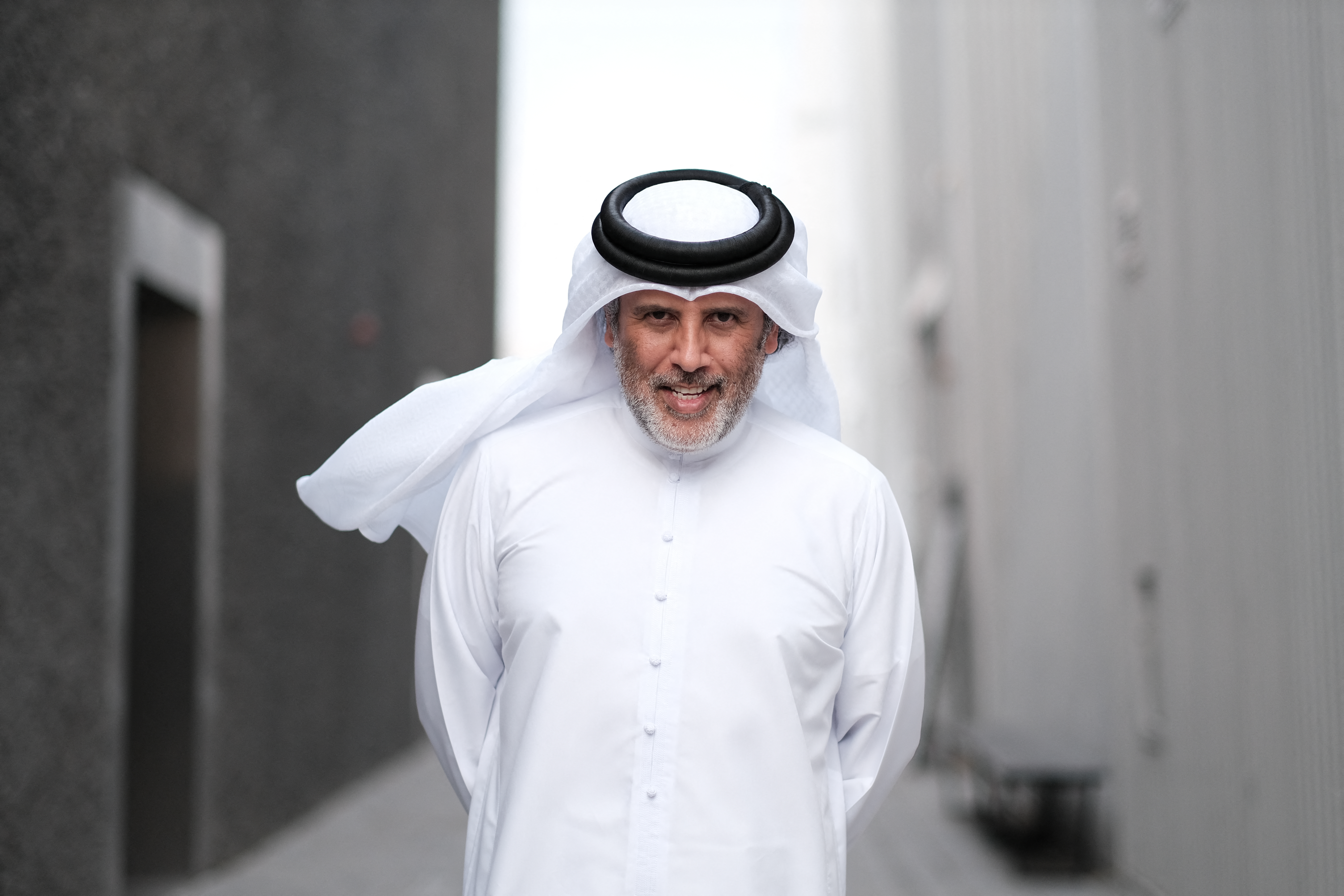
- Abdelmonem Bin Eisa Alserkal
- Born: Abdelmonem Bin Eisa Alserkal; United Arab Emirates
- Education: Point Loma Nazarene University
- Occupation: Businessman
- Known for: Founder of Alserkal Avenue
- Awards: Patron of the Arts (UAE); Chevalier of the Ordre des Arts et des Lettres; Medal for Culture and Creativity (UAE); Abu Dhabi Award

Abdelmonem Bin Eisa Alserkal (Arabic: عبد المنعم بن عيسى السركال) is an Emirati businessman and founder of Alserkal, Alserkal Avenue, Alserkal Arts Foundation and Alserkal Advisory.

== Early years and education ==
Abdul Monem bin Eisa bin Nasser Alserkal was born and raised in the United Arab Emirates, and is one of seven siblings. His grandfather Nasser bin Abdullatif Alserkal (1917-1990) was involved in setting up Dubai State Telephone Company Limited, the UAE's first telecommunication firm. His father, Eisa bin Nasser Alserkal, is a businessman involved in international trade. As a child, Alserkal was introduced to art through his father's collection of books on Islamic art and Western masterpieces.

After graduating with a bachelor degree in Business Administration (emphasis on Economics), from Point Loma Nazarene University in the 1990s, he began his career in real estate development in the UAE.

== Career ==
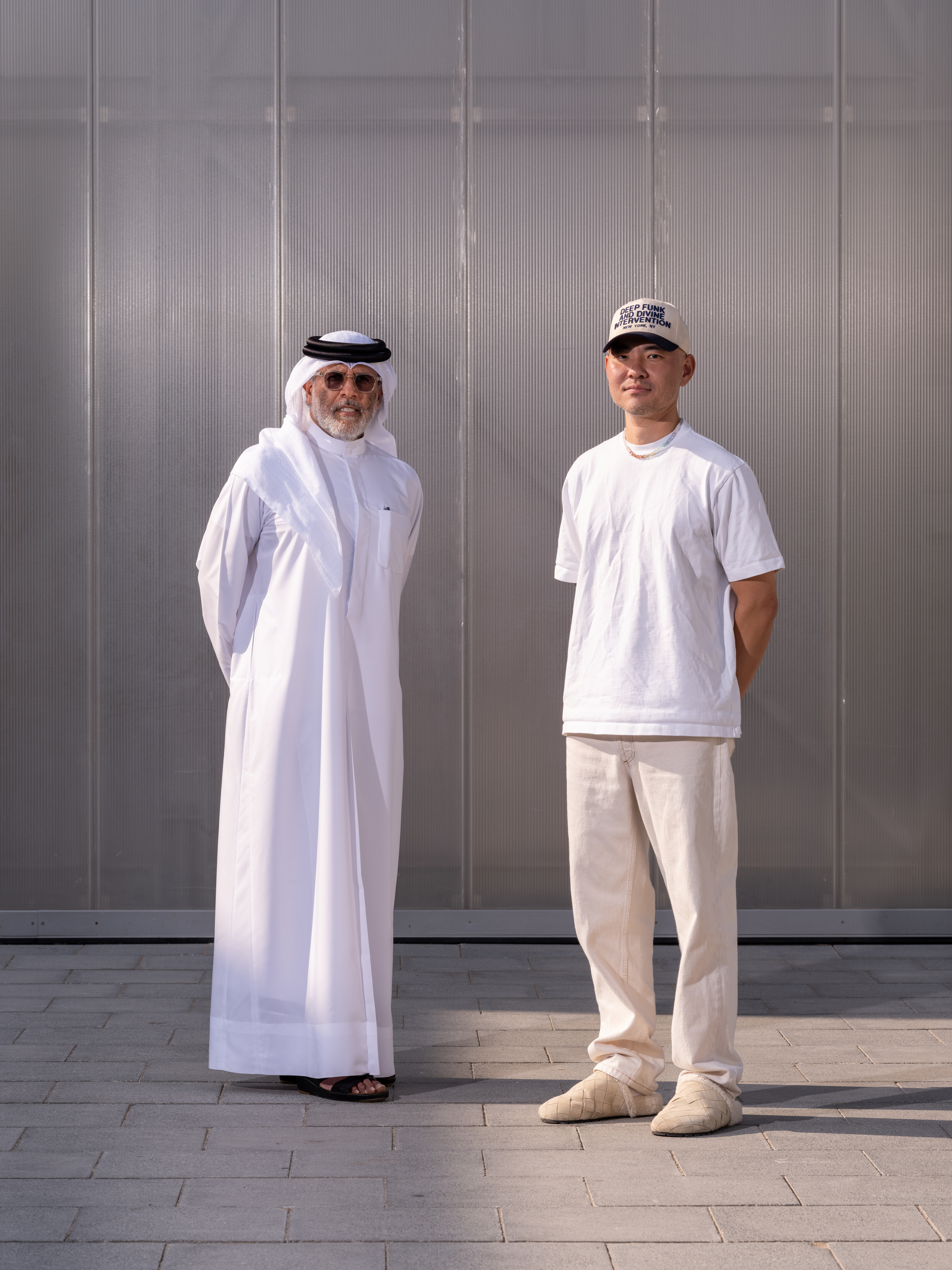
Alserkal with Jesse Lee, chairman of Design Miami, at Alserkal Avenue, at the launch of their planned Design Miami 2027 collaboration.

A patron of the arts, he is the founder of Alserkal, and Alserkal Avenue, an arts district and established cultural hub housed in a former industrial district in the Al Quoz area of Dubai. Launched in 2008, Alserkal Avenue is home a to mix of art galleries, restaurants, performance venues, and co-working spaces. Alserkal initiated an expansion of Alserkal Avenue in early 2015. In addition to more gallery space, the expansion added a black box theatre, independent cinema, and outdoor performance venue.

In March 2017, Abdelmonem inaugurated Concrete (Alserkal Avenue), a multipurpose venue and the first building in the UAE to be completed by the Office for Metropolitan Architecture (OMA). In April 2019, Concrete was shortlisted for the 2019 Aga Khan Award for Architecture. Alserkal and the Alserkal family launched Alserkal Arts Foundation in March 2019, to support multidisciplinary practices across public art commissions, residencies, research grants and educational programmes. Alserkal Advisory was launched in 2021.

Featured in Surface magazine's 2016 Power 100 list, Abdelmonem serves on the British Museum's Contemporary and Modern Middle Eastern Art Acquisition Group, the Tate's Middle East and North Africa Acquisition Committee, and the Solomon R. Guggenheim Foundation's Middle Eastern Circle.

Alserkal is also a board member of Etisalat Group.

== Awards ==
Alserkal and his family have been awarded the Patron of the Arts award twice, in 2012 and 2013, by Mohammed bin Rashid Al Maktoum, Vice President of the UAE and Prime Minister and Ruler of Dubai.

In 2023, he was appointed a Chevalier (Knight) of the French Ordre des Arts et des Lettres, in a presentation by Ambassador Nicolas Niemtchinow.

In 2024, the UAE Ministry of Culture awarded him the Medal for Culture and Creativity. In November 2025, he received the Abu Dhabi Award, that "celebrates inspiring individuals who have selflessly dedicated themselves to supporting others, while contributing to the betterment of the UAE community" under the patronage of Mohamed bin Zayed Al Nahyan, President of the UAE.
