= Ibrahim Mubarak =

Emirati writer

- Born: 1952 (age 73–74); Umm Suqeim, Jumeirah, Dubai
- Occupations: Writer, storyteller

Ibrahim Mubarak (Arabic: إبراهيم مبارك) is an Emirati writer and storyteller.

== His life ==
Ibrahim Mubarak was born in 1952 in the village of Umm Suqeim in the district of Jumeirah in Dubai, his uprising has been influenced by the realities of the village whose people live on the sea and fish, and his life came to revolve around the sea and the palm tree, and just like most of the village's hard-working people who suffer in silence for living, despite their difficult circumstances and lack of resources and poor living conditions, they were connected by affection and love. Had it not been for the oil boom, which had brought about significant changes in the society, Ibrahim Mubarak and his peers would still be fishing, and living that difficult and inevitable life and face it with patience. In the 1970s, when the wind of change was blown by improved economic conditions, a number of convictions formed in Ibrahim Mubarak that made him more determined to move towards education in order to change his reality, and then changing the lifestyle of society as a whole, He then went on the path of science, not only with a higher diploma in teaching, but also with a Bachelor of Psychology and a master's in Education from the United Arab Emirates University. He began his career as a teacher, administrative supervisor and school agent, and then head of the Education Section in Dubai Education District, then Head of the Sports Education Section of the Sports Education Department of the Ministry of Education and Youth. In addition to being a member of the Emirates Writers Union, and in the Cultural and Scientific Association, and Emirates Scout Association, and a member of the Teachers Association. In addition, he is a writer for Al-Ittihad and Al-Bayan newspapers and Al-Ahwal Magazine.

== His beginnings ==
His beginnings with writing was when he was a student in high school, where social anxiety was overwhelming and that was reflected in a group of young people and that's when he joined the “Al-Nasr club” and the club formed the Cultural Committee in Dubai, which took on the task of raising social awareness. They issued bulletins and distributed them to the members of the club or to those who they could reach. During that period, his readings varied from science, knowledge and literature, which were enhanced by the library of the club, these readings then turned into personal and private interest and were associated with his writing, especially after he entered the university. Ibrahim Mubarak has always paid tribute to his old teachers, who have come from Egypt and who have played a great role in consolidating the meaning of science and promoting society. During that time, their target was not the substance of their courses, but the Arab human race and the project of Arab nationalism, especially in the 1960s, when the United Arab Emirates was still under English occupation, their ultimate goal was to promote the Arab nation. Ibrahim Mubarak's first storyline was in 1974, when he wrote “(Arabic title: Tharybat Al-Matharib)” which speaks of “the subjugation of women” the ground from which his stories began was the Arab national grounds, which was more inclusive and his small village “Umm Suqeim” has become more open to all questions, so he took to writing more relaxed and broader humane texts while still sticking to his environmental and spatial specificity.

His marine city “Jumeirah” inhabited by fishermen and sailors, was his first reference to storytelling, he said:

“We have only a few meters between our houses and the sea, so when a child is born in this village, the first thing he hears is the sound of the sea.”

From there, Ibrahim began to store the sounds, colors, and properties of the sea.

== His Work ==
He has many books, studies and contributions, and one of his literary creations is his five-story collection:

- “The Moss” (Arabic title: Al-Tahlab).
- “Snowbird” (Arabic title: Asfoor Al-Thalg)published by Emirates Writers Union in 1991.
- “Khan” published by Emirates Writers Union in 1998.
- “Snagr Night Bird”(Arabic title: ‘thagir ta’er Al-lail) published by Emirates Writers Union in 2005.
- “The Guardian’s Grave” (Arabic title: qabir Al-wale).

He has many book:

- “The Scouting movement in the UAE” (Arabic title: Al-harakah Al-Kashfiyah fi Al-Emaraat)
- “Scouts in the Emirates” (Arabic title: Kashafat Al-Emaraat).
- “gong- Reading in cultural activities and the arts” (Arabic title: Nawaqis- qiraah fi Al-Anshi’tah Al-Thaqafiyah wa Al-Fenoon).
- “Sea coastst” (Arabic title: Sawahil Al-Bahar) published by Emirates Writers Union in 2002.
- “The resonance of the theatre” (Arabic title: Sada Al-Bahr)
- “Environmental studies; Environmental Impact Engineering for projects” (Arabic title: Al-Dirasat Al-Bieayha; handasat Al-Athar Al-Be’ei lil-Mashroat). Published by Dar El-fikr El-Arabi.

He also wrote some literary articles and poetry:

- “Sawari” an article published by Emirates Writers Union in 2009.
- “Measuring the Alleys with memories” (Arabic title: Yaqees Al-aziqah bil thikrayat) a poetry book published by Arab Scientific Publishers in 2014.

In addition, he has been distinguished by contributions to the curriculum, teaching the story “Saif and the arugula” (Arabic title: Siaf wa Al-gargoor) in the first-grade's education curriculum for more than 7 years, and he taught “Beaks” in the education curriculum of the same level. He also had contributions in the fields of Scouts education and activities; he also attended world conferences and camps in Switzerland, South Africa, Thailand, Oslo, Norway, South Korea and France. In addition to Arab conferences and camps in Morocco, Tunisia, Libya, Sultanate of Oman, Yemen, Unites Arab Emirates and Egypt.
