= Mosque of the Late Mohamed Abdulkhaliq Gargash =

Mosque in Dubai, United Arab Emirates

Coordinates: 25.1165°N 55.2132°E

Religion
- Affiliation: Islam

Location
- Location: Dubai, United Arab Emirates
- Interactive map of Mosque of the Late Mohamed Abdulkhaliq Gargash

Architecture
- Style: Contemporary architecture
- Established: 2021

Specifications
- Dome: 1
- Minaret: 1

The Mosque of the Late Mohamed Abdulkhaliq Gargash is a mosque located in the Al Quoz district of Dubai, United Arab Emirates.

The mosque was patronized by the Gargash family in honor of their patriarch, Mohamed Abdulkhaliq Gargash, who died in 2016. It was designed by Sumaya Dabbagh and is one of the first mosques in the UAE to be designed by a woman. The mosque was completed in 2021. Spread over an area of 1,680 square metres (18,100 ft^{2}), it can accommodate 1,000 worshippers. The mosque's design follows a contemporary, minimalist style. Its facade is built out of white stone, which is adorned by geometric and calligraphic patterns. A verse from the Quran, etched into the facade, provides a metaphoric "protective band", while recessed triangular perforations allow natural light into the building.

A courtyard divides the mosque into two blocks. The larger of the blocks is surmounted by a dome. Perforations in the dome illuminate the interior. This block contains the men's prayer hall on the ground floor and the women's prayer hall on the first floor. The mihrab is backlit in order to draw attention to the direction towards Mecca. The smaller of the blocks includes an ablution space on the ground floor and the residences for the mosque's imam and muezzin on the first floor. The courtyard separating the two blocks is shaded by a canopy perforated to allow light to penetrate. The courtyard represents a division of the building's spiritual and material functions. A freestanding minaret is situated near the main building.
