= Economical Printing Press =

The Economical Printing Press
- Trade name: The Economical Printing Press L.L.C
- Native name: المطبعة الاقتصادية و مكتبها ذ.م.م
- Type: Commercial printing press
- Industry: Printing
- Founded: Dubai, United Arab Emirates (July 22, 1975))
- Founder: "Hassan Fahmi" Saleh Al Shunnar
- Headquarters: Dubai, United Arab Emirates
- Number of locations: Al Quoz
- Key people: Hassan Al Shunnar (CEO)
- Services: Business cards, stationery, office supplies
- Number of employees: 51
- Website: www.economicalprintingdubai.com

This is the first logo the company used back in 1975 for its identity, which was replaced in 2013 in favor of a modern approach

The Economical Printing Press is the second commercial printing press to be established in Dubai. The Economical Printing Press is specialized in ABT and BLT media.

== History ==
The company was founded by Mr. "Hassan Fahmi" Saleh AlShunnar, an architectural engineer who migrated to Dubai in the early 1960's looking for work.

The Economical Printing Press was forced to downsize its employee count in 2009 due to the great recession that hit Dubai in that period.

The company relocated its headquarters to Al Quoz in Dubai.
