= English College Dubai =

Coordinates: 25°10′11.2″N 55°14′16.9″E

The English College, Dubai

Location
- Sheikh Zayed Road; Al Safa 1, Dubai; United Arab Emirates

Information
- School type: Independent school
- Opened: 1992
- Principal: Emily Hopkinson
- Gender: Coeducational
- Education system: British National Curriculum
- Language: English
- Houses: Eagle Falcon Hawk Kestrel
- Colour
- Sports: Rugby, football, netball, rock climbing, swimming, cricket, athletics
- Website: https://englishcollegedubai.com

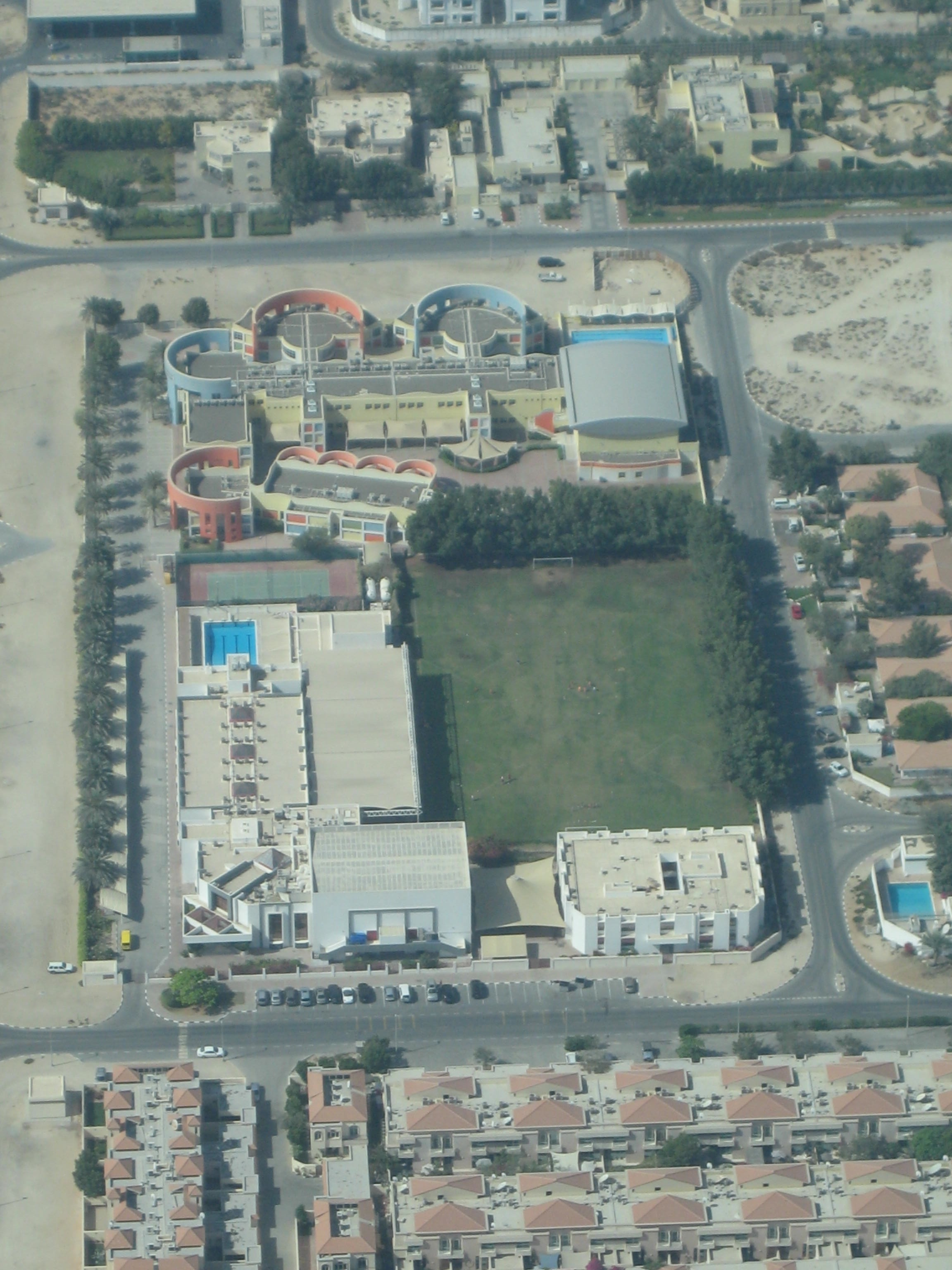
The English College, Dubai as seen from the air

The English College, Dubai is a non-selective day school in Dubai for pupils between the ages of 4 and 18 years. The English College follows the National Curriculum for England and has 1,480 students from a variety of nationalities. The school offers IGCSE and International A-levels with some exceptions

The premises are located in the Al Safa and house a swimming pool, sports hall, two libraries, football field, basketball court, art studio and a Sixth Form common room.

== History ==
The English College, Dubai is an independent school which was opened on April 1, 1992. In January 2019, the English College merged with Manor Primary School and became an all-through school: Primary school (FS1 to Year 6), and Secondary school (Year 7 to Year 13).

== School rating ==
The Knowledge and Human Development Authority (KHDA) is an educational quality assurance authority based in Dubai that undertakes early learning, school, and higher learning institution management and inspections for which it then publishes comprehensive reports. KHDA has awarded The English College, Dubai a ranking of "Very Good" in terms of overall performance for the last two consecutive years.
