= Salsali Private Museum =

Museum in Dubai, United Arab Emirates

Coordinates: 25°08′24″N 55°13′32″E

Salsali Private Museum [ SPM ] صلصالــي
- Established: 2011
- Dissolved: 2019
- Location: Alserkal Avenue, Al Quoz, Dubai
- Collection size: Contemporary art
- President: Ramin Salsali
- Curator: Ramin Salsali
- Website: www.salsalipm.com

The Salsali Private Museum [SPM], in Dubai, United Arab Emirates, was one of the first private museums in the region for contemporary Middle Eastern and international art. It was founded in November 2011 by Ramin Salsali and was located in the industrial area of Al Quoz on Alserkal Avenue, a complex known in the region for its concentration of galleries and creative spaces.

Exhibitions at SPM featured artworks from the Salsali collection and exhibits from across the globe. SPM served as an independent center for art collectors.

The museum was permanently closed in March 2019

== Founder ==
Ramin Salsali began collecting art at the age of 21. Born in Tehran in 1964, he studied economics, strategic management, and marketing with a focus on industry design in Germany and England.

In April 2011, Salsali established the museum in Dubai. SPM opened in November 2011 as the first private museum for contemporary art in the region. It exhibits Salsali's collection of over 900 pieces of painting, photography, video art, sculpture, and installation art.

== Past exhibitions ==
- SHOW OFF! (November 2011)
- LIFE IS TOO SHORT (March 2012)
- THE SEISMIC SANCTUARY by Pantea Rahmani (September 2012)
- IRAN - RPM (November 2012)
- OLYMPIA by Bryan Ferry (December 2012)
- REZA DERAKSHANI (March 2013)
- CHRISTIAN VOIGT (September 2013)
- CINEMA (December 2013)
- IMRAN QURESHI (January 2014)
- AMIR HOSSEIN ZANJANI] (March 2014)
- HIDDEN CONSCIOUSNESS by Mohammed Ehsai (March 2014)
- THE INVISIBLE LANDSCAPE AND CONCRETE FUTURES by Hazem Harb (March 2015)
- GERMAN COOL (November 2015)

== Publications ==
- "Reza Derakshani - Selected works"
- The Seismics Sanctuary - Pantea Rahmani
- Amir Hossein Zanjani solo exhibition catalogue
- "GERMAN COOL" exhibition catalogue
