= Pantea Rahmani =

Iranian artist

Pantea Rahmani (Persian: پانته‌آ رحمانی. Born 10 September 1971, in Tehran) is an Iranian contemporary artist, known for her self-portraits.

== Life ==
Rahmani was born on 10 September 1971 in Tehran, Iran. She studied visual art at the Fine Department of the Art at University of Tehran and in 1999, she graduated with a B.F.A in Painting and Drawing.

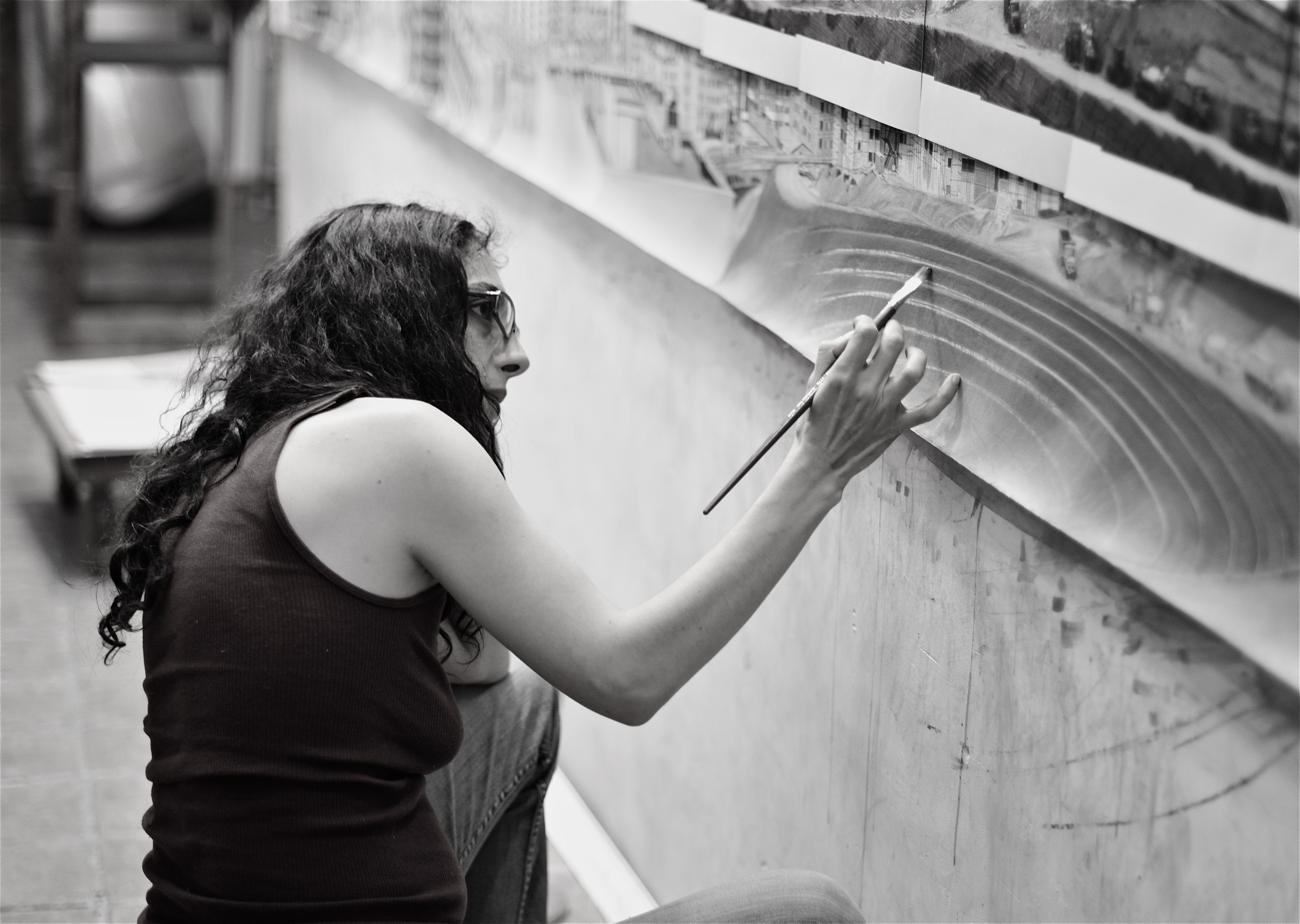
Rahmani working on the Tehran pictures at her atelier

== Work ==
Rahmani often uses dark and acherontic shades of grey for her self portraits on large canvas.

Both of her Tehran pictures and her "NO.7", were shown at a 2012 solo exhibition called "The Seismic Sanctuary" at the Salsali Private Museum in Dubai. Rahmani has had exhibitions at Iranian art galleries and museums such as Niavaran Cultural Center, and The Museum of Contemporary Arts. She also has participated in exhibitions such as Dessin, Drawing exhibition in Kyoto University of Arts & Design, Japan and CROQU'ART (women's movements) in Brussels, Belgium.

== See also ==
- List of Iranian women artists
