= Umm Al Sheif =

Umm Al Sheif ام الشيف
- Community
- Location within Dubai
- Coordinates: 25.13138°N 55.20381°E
- Country: United Arab Emirates
- Emirate: Dubai
- City: Dubai

Area
  - Total: 1.87 km^{2} (0.72 sq mi)

Population (2000)
  - Total: 6,263
  - Density: 3,350/km^{2} (8,670/sq mi)
- Community number: 367

Umm Al Sheif (Arabic: أم الشيف) is a locality in Dubai, United Arab Emirates (UAE). Umm Al Sheif is a small, residential locality in western Dubai. It is bordered to the north by Umm Suqeim, the northeast by Al Manara, the south by Al Barsha and Al Quoz and the west by Al Sufouh. It is bounded to the north by route D 92 (Al Wasl Road) and to the south by route E 11 (Sheikh Zayed Road). A local road (Al Thaniya Road) separates Umm Al Sheif from Al Manara.

Umm Al Sheif is a developing, affluent residential community with villas and town houses. The local road system primarily conforms to the grid plan, however, residential communities are divided typically into lots. Even-numbered roads run northeast–southwest, while odd-numbered roads sun northwest–southeast. The Emirates International School is located in Umm Al Sheif.

Umm Al Sheif is around a 15-minute drive from Burj khalifa, and around same distance from Palm Jumeirah Island.

== Archaeological monuments ==
One of the most important heritage landmarks in the region is the Umm Al Sheif Chamber Council building, which was built in 1955 and was used by Sheikh Rashid bin Saeed Al Maktoum as his summer residence, where he used to spend some evening periods during the summer season.
