= DUCTAC =

Non-profit community center in Dubai, UAE

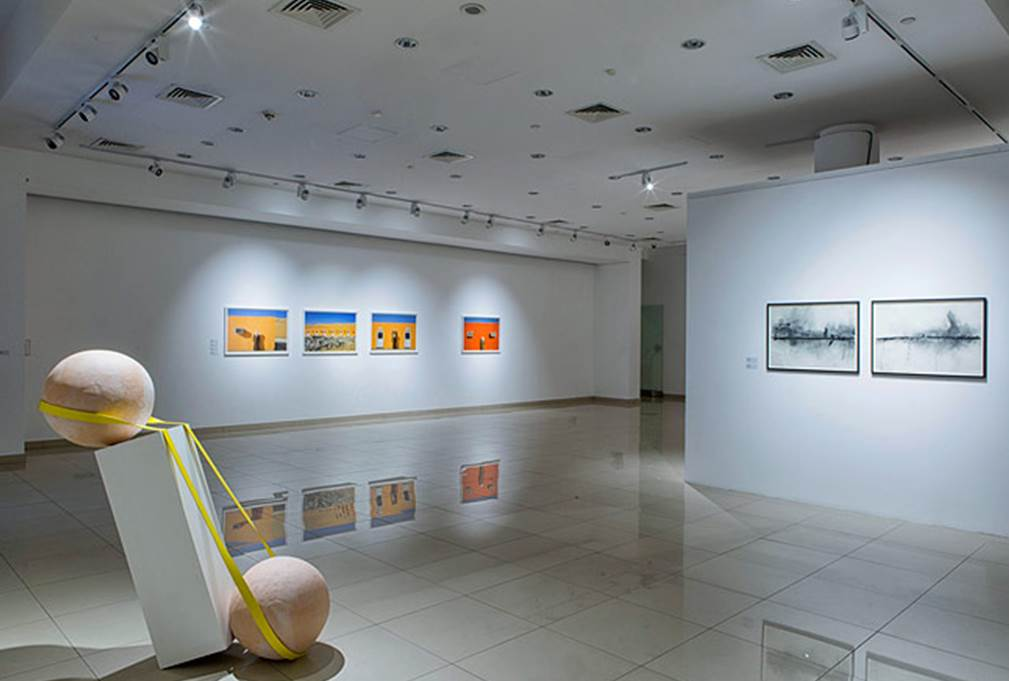
Exhibition at the Dubai Community Theatre & Arts Centre

Dubai Community Theatre & Arts Centre (DUCTAC) is a non-profit community center based in the city of Dubai, United Arab Emirates, hosting events program, courses and art exhibitions. Founded in 2006, the DUCTAC was located in the Mall of the Emirates, covering an area of 77,952 ft sq (7,424 m sq). The center included:

- Centrepoint Theatre: two levels theatre featuring a 120 m2 (1291 ft2) proscenium stage with 543 seat capacity.
- Kilachand Studio Theatre: a smaller theatre divided into 10 raked tiers that hold 151 seats
- Gallery of Light: contemporary art gallery space that is dedicated to working with local artists
- Dance Studios: Three different capacity woonden floor studios.
- Art Studios: 14 Art Studios ranging in size and capacity
- Balcony Lounge: 3,240 sq2 ft carpet fitted area with a capacity of 100 people suitable for seminars and talks

In July 2018, Dubai Community Theatre & Arts Centre (DUCTAC) closed at the Mall of the Emirates. At the time it announced plans to relocate to the Mirdif City Centre in September 2018.

== See also ==
- Art in Dubai
- Dubai Culture
