= Mall of the World =

Planned shopping center in Dubai

Mall of the World was a project to build the largest shopping center of its kind in the world, which envisioned a fully air conditioned city, comprising more than 4,500,000 square metres (48 million square feet). Mall of the World was originally announced in November 2012 and was planned to be the largest shopping mall in the world, to be located in Mohammed bin Rashid City, a mixed-use development in Dubai, United Arab Emirates. In August 2016, Dubai Holding announced Mall of the World would be relocated to Sheikh Mohammad bin Zayed Road. The original plan included eight million square feet of shopping areas, the largest indoor game park in the world with a dome that can be opened during the winter time, and areas for theaters, cultural events, medical tourism, and about 20,000 hotel rooms. The mall was expected to be able to receive 180 million visitors annually.

As of 2025, construction has yet to start.

== See also ==
- List of shopping malls in Dubai
- List of the world's largest shopping malls
- Mall of Arabia (Dubai) – in Mohammed bin Rashid City
- Mall of the Emirates
