= Art in Dubai =

Art in Dubai is an emerging activity in Dubai, United Arab Emirates. New galleries such as Carbon 12 Dubai, art fairs, artists, art patrons and collectors have grown in number.

== Art fairs ==
Dubai hosts several international art fairs, including Art Dubai and Sikka Art Fair. Art Dubai takes place every March at Madinat Jumeirah. It was the nation's first contemporary art fair. The 2009 fair hosted nearly seventy galleries from the Middle East, Asia, Europe, North and South America, North Africa and Australia. In addition, artists' projects were initiated, including the launch of The Abraaj Group Art Prize and Global Art Forum:3.

== Media ==
The arts in Dubai and the surrounding Gulf and Middle East arts scene are covered in magazines, film, radio and online.

=== Magazines ===
- Vision is a Dubai-based Magazine presenting Dubai's perspective on art, music, culture, business and life in the Emirate.
- Brownbook, based in Dubai, is an urban lifestyle guide focusing on art, design, and travel across the Middle East and North Africa.
- Canvas is an international bi-monthly magazine dedicated to art and culture from the Middle East and Arab world.
- Bidoun covers art and culture from the Middle East.
- Harpers Bazaar Art Arabia was launched in early 2012 and has now become a bi-monthly, dedicated to contemporary art from the Middle East and the Arab World.
- Contemporary Art Practices is another journal.
- Selections Magazine is a bi-monthly portfolio of arts, culture, design, and style from the Arab world and beyond.

=== Film ===
Director Katy Chang's Glitter Dust: Finding Art in Dubai is a documentary about cultural integration and immigration through the lens of the Dubai art scene. The film features Dubai-based artists Shaqayeq Arabi, Vivek Premachandran (UBIK) and Hazem Mahdi, with commentary from art historian Marcelo Lima and others. Chang runs the Twitter feed, Art in Dubai, covering Middle Eastern art and reviews.

=== Radio ===
Siobhan Leydon's weekly lunchtime Dubai Eye 103.8 radio show The Edge covers art, culture, architecture, design, world music, books, theatre etc., in the region and internationally.

=== Online ===
A number of online galleries are emerging Dubai as entrepreneurs in emirate compete for new collectors in the lucrative art dealing market.

== See also ==
- Culture of Dubai
- Dubai Culture and Arts Authority
- DUCTAC
- Tashkeel Dubai
- Alserkal Avenue
