= Concrete (Alserkal Avenue) =

- Interactive map of the Concrete area

General information
- Location: Al Quoz, Dubai
- Coordinates: 25.1420°N 55.2253°E

Design and construction
- Architecture firm: Office for Metropolitan Architecture, OMA

Concrete is a multi-disciplinary space located on Alserkal Avenue in the Al Quoz district of Dubai. It is the first building in the United Arab Emirates to be completed by the Office for Metropolitan Architecture (OMA). With multiple configurations, the 600-square-metre Concrete has double-height ceilings, movable walls and a translucent facade that can be positioned to create indoor-outdoor experiences.

Iyad Alsaka of OMA's Dubai office was the lead architect on the project, which opened to public in March 2017 with the exhibition Syria: Into the Light, organized the Atassi Foundation. Non-profit exhibitions held in Concrete since its inauguration are: While We Wait, commissioned by the Victoria & Albert Museum; Ishara: Signs, Symbols and Shared Languages, in partnership with UAE Unlimited; Adapt to Survive in collaboration with Hayward Gallery, London, and Fabric(ated) Fractures, in collaboration with Samdani Art Foundation.

In April 2019, Concrete was shortlisted for the 2019 Aga Khan Award for Architecture.
