= Glitter Dust: Finding Art in Dubai =

- Directed by: Katy Chang; J.R. Osborn
- Music by: Ben Bracken; Ashley Bellouin
- Release date: 2011

Glitter Dust: Finding Art in Dubai is a feature-length documentary about cultural integration and immigration through the lens of the Dubai art scene. The film features Dubai-based artists Shaqayeq Arabi, Vivek Premachandran (UBIK) and Hazem Mahdi, with commentary from art historian Marcelo Lima and others.

The artists come to terms with life in the city. Hand-drawn animations interplay with live footage. The documentary explores the artists behind the flash of Dubai.

The film was directed Katy Chang and J.R. Osborn, with music from Ben Bracken and Ashley Bellouin, and sound by Drew Kennedy.

The film premiered at the Gulf Film Festival, and also screened at the Carmel Art and Film Festival, Beloit International Film Festival, Jerusalem Film Festival, Brisbane International Film Festival, among others.
