= Al Safa =

Al Safa الصفا
- Community
- Interactive map of Al Safa
- Coordinates: 25.17046°N 55.23273°E
- Country: United Arab Emirates
- Emirate: Dubai
- City: Dubai

Area
  - Total: 4.5 km^{2} (1.7 sq mi)

Population (2024)
  - Total: 16,986
  - Density: 3,800/km^{2} (9,800/sq mi)
- Community number: 353; 357

Al Safa (Arabic: الصفا) is a locality in Dubai, United Arab Emirates (UAE). Al Safa is located in western Dubai and is bordered to the north by Jumeirah, to the south by Al Quoz, to the east by Al Wasl, and to the west by Al Manara. Al Safa is bounded to the northwest and southwest by routes D 92 (Al Wasl Road) and E 11 (Sheikh Zayed Road) respectively.

Al Safa is a residential area; Interchange No. 2 (Pepsi Interchange) of Sheikh Zayed Road forms the southeastern periphery of the locality. Al Safa terminates at Interchange No. 3. Al Safa is divided into two subcommunities — Al Safa 1 and Al Safa 2, which house extremely affluent residential communities. Important landmarks in Al Safa include Emirates English Speaking School, Jumeirah English Speaking School, Jumeirah Primary School and English College Dubai.
