= Umm Suqeim =

Umm Suqeim ام سقيم
- Community
- Interactive map of Umm Suqeim
- Coordinates: 25.16362°N 55.21454°E
- Country: United Arab Emirates
- Emirate: Dubai
- City: Dubai

Area
  - Total: 7.2 km^{2} (2.8 sq mi)

Population (2000)
  - Total: 16,459
  - Density: 2,300/km^{2} (5,900/sq mi)
- Community number: 356 (Umm Suqeim 1); 362 (Umm Suqeim 2); 366 (Umm Suqeim 3)

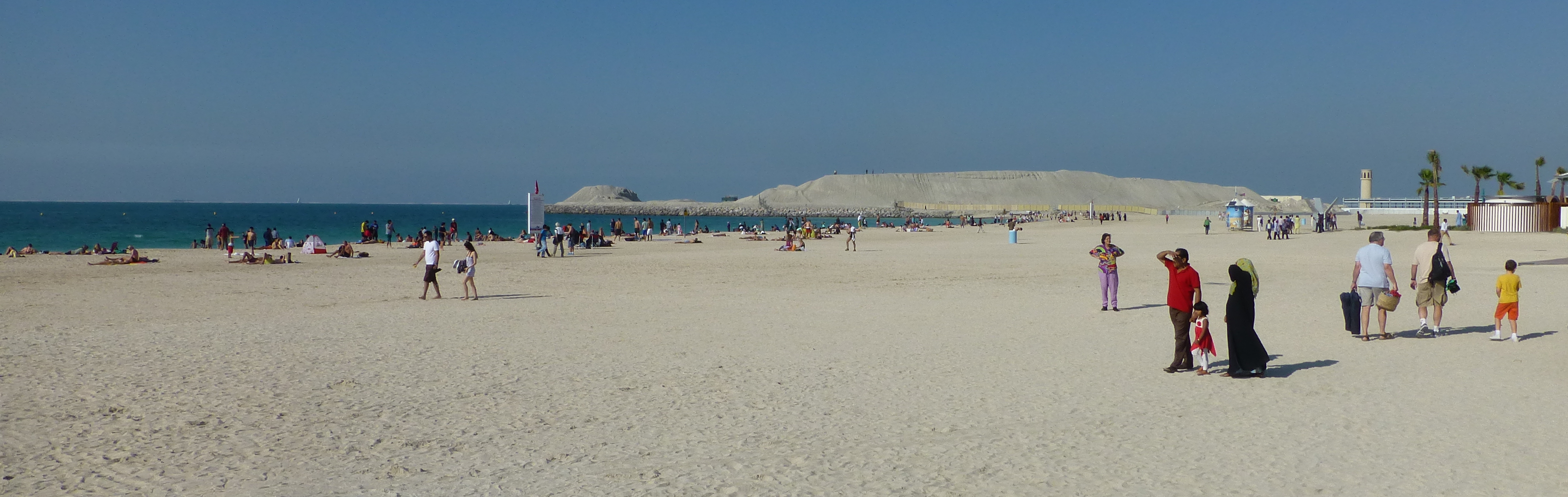

Umm Suqeim (Arabic: أم سقيم) is a locality in Dubai, United Arab Emirates (UAE). Umm Suqeim is located in western Dubai, along the Jumeirah Beach coastline. It is bordered to the north by Jumeirah, to the south by Al Sufouh, and to the west by Al Safa, Al Manara and Umm Al Sheif.

Umm Suqeim comprises three sub-communities - — Umm Suqeim 1, Umm Suqeim 2 and Umm Suqeim 3 — which house affluent residential communities and tourist attractions. Umm Al Sheif Road separates Umm Suqeim from Jumeirah while routing D 65 (Al Manara Road) separates Umm Suqeim 1 from Umm Suqeim 2 and Al Thanya Road separates Umm Suqeim 2 from Umm Suqeim 3. Al Thanya Road is the most important road in all of Umm Suqeim because of the residents that live on it.

Several important tourist attractions and commercial centers are located in Umm Suqeim. Emirates International School, Suqeim Public Park are located in Umm Suqeim 2, while Jumeirah Beach Hotel, Burj Al Arab and Wild Wadi Water Park is located in Umm Suqeim 3, along the sub-community Jumeirah Beach coast. Schools in the area include Emirates International School – Jumeirah, and King's Dubai School, a private primary school with around 900 students enrolled.

The Umm Suqeim Park is a public park that provides various recreational activities suitable for visitors of all ages. The park is close to Umm Suqeim Beach (also called Sunset Beach) and the Burj al Arab.
