= Emirates International School – Jumeirah =

Private selective school in Dubai, United Arab Emirates

Emirates International School - Jumeirah

Location
- Al Thanya Street; Umm Al Sheif; Dubai, P.O. Box 6446; United Arab Emirates; 25.1347°N 55.2100°E

Information
- Former name: Emirates International School
- School type: Private
- Established: 1991
- Founder: Sheikh Dr. Majid Al Qassimi
- Authority: KHDA
- Principal: Jayne Needham
- Chief Academic Officer: Sir Christopher Stone
- Teaching staff: 182
- Years: EY1-13
- Gender: Both
- Age range: 3-18
- Enrollment: 2,260
- Average class size: 22
- Student to teacher ratio: 1:12
- Education system: International Baccalaureate
- Language: English
- Hours in school day: 6 hours 45 minutes
- Campus: Suburban
- Campus size: 12 acres
- Campus type: suburb
- Slogan: Achieving Excellence
- Nickname: Jaguars
- School fees: AED 38,636 to AED 81,872
- Affiliations: Council of International Schools (CIS) Accreditation
- Website: eischools.ae/jumeirah/

Emirates International School – Jumeirah (EISJ), formerly known as Emirates International School, is a private international IB world school, in Dubai. Established in 1991, the school caters for students from KG1 to year 13, and is situated in the Umm Al Sheif area of Jumeirah. Students prepare for the IB PYP, MYP and DP examinations. It is a private LLC owned by the Al Habtoor group. In 2005, a secondary sister school was founded, Emirates International school - Meadows and the original branch was renamed Emirates International School – Jumeirah.

The school is a member of the Council of international of Schools and The Alliance for Sustainable Schools (TASS).

== Educational curriculum ==
In 1991, EISJ was the first school in Dubai authorized to offer the International Baccalaureate Diploma Programme. Globaly it is one of the few schools that over all 4 International Baccalaureate programmes IBPYP, IBMYP, IBDP and IBCP. In particular, the IB Career-related Programme (IBCP), an alternative to the IBDP with career related courses, is not frequently offered by other schools locally or internationally.

- Primary Years Programme (PYP) – EY 1 to Year 6, ages 3–11
- Middle Years Programme (MYP) – Grades 7 to 11, ages 11–16
- IB Diploma Programme (DP) – Grades 12 to 13, ages 16–18
- IB Career-Related Certificates (IBCC) – Grades 12 to 13, ages 16–18

== KHDA inspection report ==
The Knowledge and Human Development Authority (KHDA) is an educational quality assurance authority based in Dubai, United Arab Emirates. It undertakes early learning, school and higher learning institution management and rates them as well.

A summary of the inspection ratings for Emirates International School.

2023-2024	2022-2023	2021-2022	2020-2021	2019-2020	2018-2019	2017-2018	2016-2017	2015-2016	2014-2015	2013-2014	2012-2013	2011-2012	2010-2011	2009-2010	2008-2009
Very good	Good	Good	Good	Good	Good	Good	Good	Good	Good	Good	Good	Good	Good	Good	Acceptable

=== School fees ===
The school fees for 2024-2025 are AED 38,636 for EY1 to Year 1, AED 45,994 for Year 2 to Year 3, AED 51,510 for Year 4 to Year 6, 60,716 for Year 7 to Year 9, AED 69,913 for Year 10 to Year 11, and AED 81,872 for Year 12-13.

== Campus ==
The campus of Emirates International school offers many facilities such as 11 science laboratories, a robotic lab, multiple art and music roopms, 3 libraries, a 568 seat theatre, a swimming pool, 2 grass sports pitches, and a fitness suite.

The school renovated with an extension building to the campus in 2016.

== Student body ==
There are over 2000 students of approximately 100 nationalities from EY1 to Year 13.

== Extracurricular activities ==
The school has hosted an annual Model United Nations conference, EISJMUN, since 2018 that is attended by around 700 students from schools across the United Arab Emirates.
