= Vision (magazine) =

Quarterly magazine in Dubai, UAE

Vision Magazine
- Categories: Magazine
- Frequency: Quarterly
- First issue: December 2010
- Company: Falcon and Associates
- Country: UAE
- Based in: Dubai
- Language: English
- Website: Vision

Vision magazine is a quarterly magazine published by Falcon and Associates, a strategic advisory concern working on behalf of the Dubai government. The magazine was first published in December 2010. The quarterly covers business, music, culture, life and sports in the Emirate

Published by Falcon and Associates, the brand comprises a quarterly print magazine, a digital edition for iPad and desktop and the website, all published in English. A Chinese print magazine and website are also available, both in Mandarin.

Vision magazine is the second largest audited publication in the UAE with a BPA* audited figure of 61,986 copies. Its contributors include leading journalists and thought leaders from across the world. Previous cover stars have included Richard Branson, Bill Gates, Pelé and Kevin Spacey.

The brand’s print editions are distributed in airline lounges in all major cities, on board key international airlines, at exhibitions and conferences and in all Jumeirah Group properties around the world.

== Vision Digital Edition ==
In 2015, the Vision Digital Edition was made available via the Apple App Store and Apple Newsstand for iPad.
