= Dubai Hills =

Residential area in Dubai

Coordinates: 25.09449°N 55.24518°E

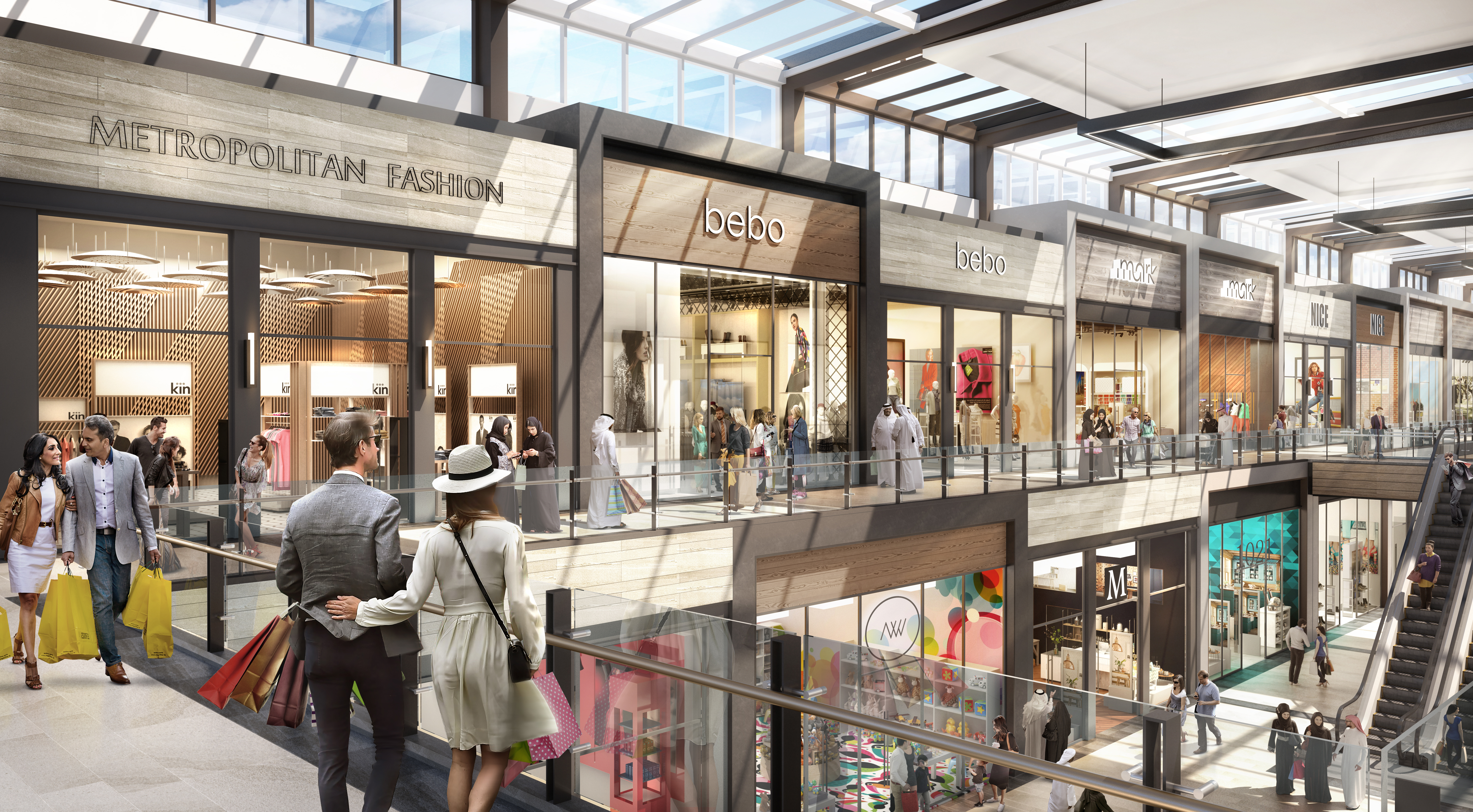
Inside Dubai Hills Mall

Dubai Hills, also known as Dubai Hills Estate, is a luxury residential area located within Mohammed bin Rashid City, Dubai, United Arab Emirates.

It is home to the expatriate community of Dubai. Dubai Hills includes villas, apartments, business parks and the Dubai Hills Mall. The villas and apartments are grouped around an 18-hole golf course.

Dubai Hills has been developed by Emaar Properties. It is close to the Dubai Hills Hospital of King's College Hospital Dubai, GEMS Wellington Academy, Al Khail, and the Mall of the Emirates.

Dubai Hills is home to Dubai Hills Golf Club, a course that was awarded the World's Best New Golf Course 2019 at the World Golf Awards, Abu Dhabi. Dubai Hills Golf Club also won United Arab Emirates' Best Golf Course in 2021.

== See also ==
- Dubai Hills Mall
