= Emirates International School - Meadows =

Emirates International School – Meadows

Location
- Emirates Hills, Dubai; Dubai; United Arab Emirates
- Coordinates: 25.0640°N 55.1579°E

Information
- School type: Private international school
- Motto: "Excellence Through Innovation"
- Established: 10 September 2005
- Founder: Khalaf Ahmad Al Habtoor
- Principal: Mr. Ian Ward
- Grades: EY1–Year 13 (Ages 3–18)
- Education system: International Baccalaureate
- Language: English
- Campus size: 25 acres
- Campus type: Suburban
- Colours: Red and White
- Mascot: Phoenix
- Accreditation: CIS, NEASC, IBO
- Affiliation: Al Habtoor Group
- Website: www.eischools.ae/Meadows

Emirates International School – Meadows (EISM) is a private co-educational international school located in the Meadows area of Emirates Hills, Dubai, United Arab Emirates. The school was established on 10 September 2005 and operates under the ownership of the Al Habtoor Group. It is the second Emirates international school, with its sister school founded in 1991 and located in Jumeirah.

== Overview ==
The school provides international education for students from Early Years through Year 13 (ages 3–18). It is situated on a 25-acre suburban campus near Dubai Marina, The Lakes, and Jumeirah Lake Towers.

== Educational curriculum ==
The school is an authorized International Baccalaureate (IB) World School and offers:

- Primary Years Programme (PYP) – EY 1 to Year 6
- Middle Years Programme (MYP) – Grades 7 to 11
- IB Diploma Programme (DP) – Grades 12 to 13

The curriculum emphasizes inquiry-based learning, global citizenship, and critical thinking.

== Facilities ==
The campus includes:

- Digital classrooms
- Science labs and libraries
- Art and music studios
- Gymnasium and Drama studio
- Swimming pool and football field
- basketball court
- Cafeteria and medical clinic

== Student demographics ==
As of 2023/24, the school has ~1,850 students of 85+ nationalities and over 180 faculty members, with a student–teacher ratio of 10:1. The school celebrates diversity and inclusion.

== Extracurricular activities ==
Activities include:

- Sports: Football, swimming, basketball, tennis, cricket, athletics
- Academics: Model United Nations, debate, robotics, coding
- Arts: Theatre, music, visual arts
- Awards: The Duke of Edinburgh's Award
- Environmental and sustainability clubs

The school regularly competes in local and global events such as the World Scholar's Cup.

== Community engagement ==
The school encourages civic involvement and supports:

- Expo 2020
- Environmental projects
- Charity fundraising
- Cultural exchanges
- Social responsibility campaigns

== Academic achievement ==
EIS Meadows students perform above IB world averages and gain admission to top universities such as Oxford, Cambridge, Harvard, and MIT.

== Accreditation ==
The school is accredited by:

- Council of International Schools (CIS)
- New England Association of Schools and Colleges (NEASC)
- International Baccalaureate Organization (IBO)

It is inspected by the Knowledge and Human Development Authority (KHDA).

== Leadership ==
The school is led by Principal Mr. Ian Ward, supported by Deputy Principals and divisional Heads. It is governed by a Board of Directors appointed by the Al Habtoor Group.

== Jumeirah campus ==
The sister campus in Umm Suqeim was founded in 1991 and serves over 2,100 students through the full IB continuum.

== Notable alumni ==
- Fahim bin Sultan Al Qasimi – Businessman and entrepreneur
- Dina Shihabi – Actress
- Raha Moharrak – First Saudi woman to summit Mount Everest
