= Al Manara, Dubai =

Al Manara المنارة
- Community
- Interactive map of Al Manara
- Coordinates: 25.14451°N 55.21317°E
- Country: United Arab Emirates
- Emirate: Dubai
- City: Dubai

Area
  - Total: 2.1 km^{2} (0.81 sq mi)

Population (2000)
  - Total: 2,147
  - Density: 1,000/km^{2} (2,600/sq mi)
- Community number: 363

Al Manara (Arabic: المنارة) is a locality in Dubai, United Arab Emirates (UAE). Located in western Dubai, Al Manara is bordered to the north by Umm Suqeim, the east and south by Al Quoz and the west by Umm Al Sheif. Al Manara, literally meaning The Beacon, is a developing residential community and houses many affluent villas and town housees. The locality is bounded to the southeast by route E 11 (Sheikh Zayed Road). Interchange No. 3 on Sheikh Zayed Road (also known as Al Manara Interchange) forms the southeasternmost section of the locality. Al Manara is separated from Umm Al Sheif by a local road (Al Thaniya Road).
