= Al Quoz =

Al Quoz القوز
- Community
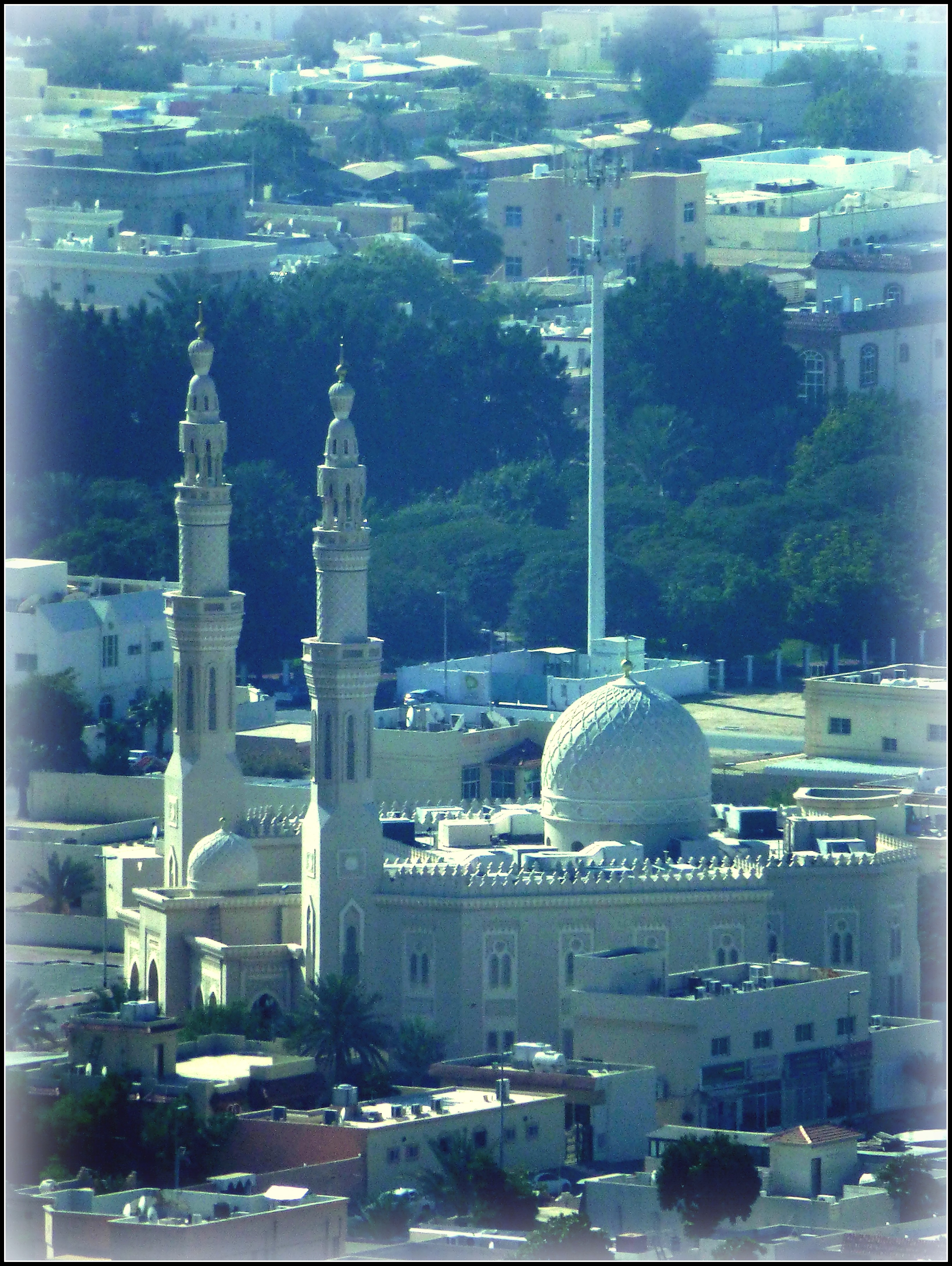
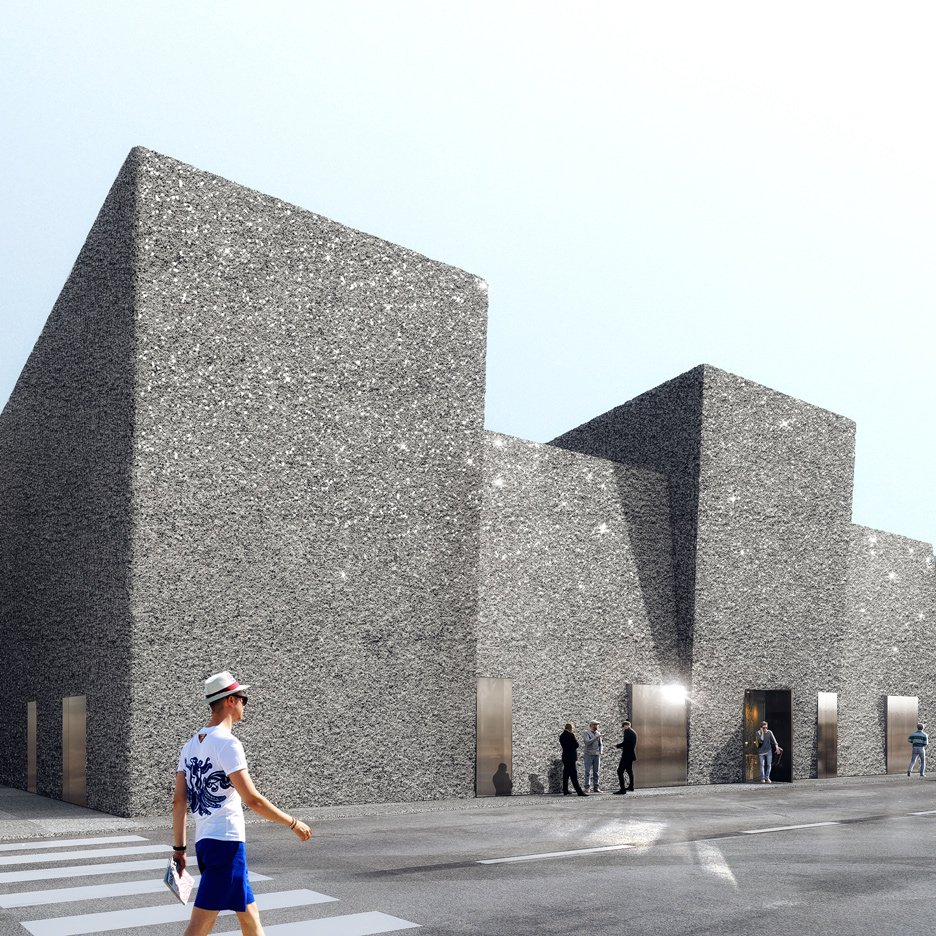
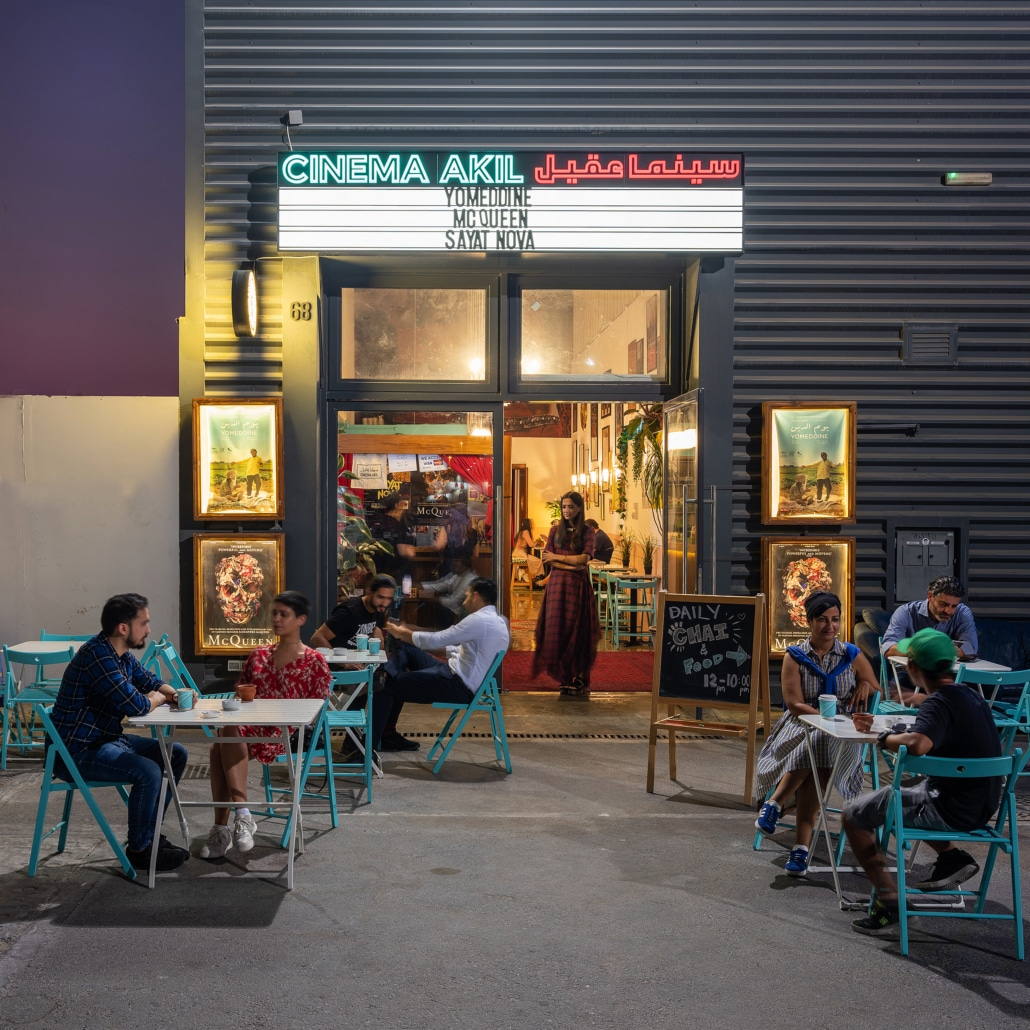
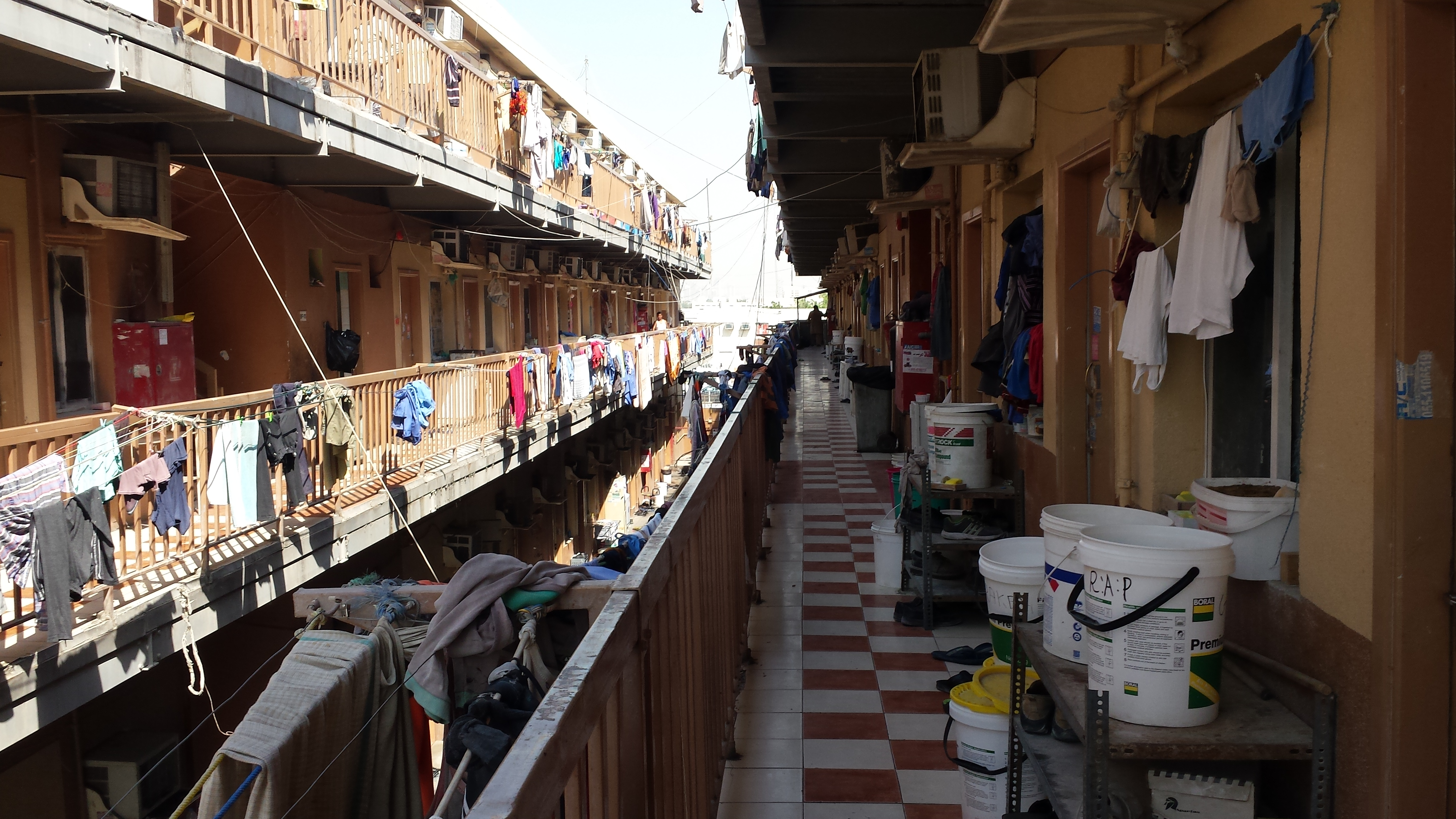
- Clockwise, from top: Masjid Imam al Montadhar, Alserkal Avenue, Cinema Akil, and labor camp in Al Quoz Industrial 4

- Interactive map of Al Quoz
- Coordinates: 25°07′51″N 55°13′58″E
- Country: United Arab Emirates
- Emirate: Dubai
- City: Dubai
- Boroughs: Al Quoz 1; Al Quoz 3; Al Quoz 4; Al Quoz Industrial 1; Al Quoz Industrial 2; Al Quoz Industrial 3; Al Quoz Industrial 4

Population (2024)
  - Total: 355,356
- Community number: 354; 358-359; 364-365; 368-369

Al Quoz (Arabic: القوز) or El Goze in Emirati Arabic is a district of Dubai, United Arab Emirates (UAE). Al Quoz is located in western Dubai. With a population of 355,356, Al Quoz stands as one of the most densely populated districts in both the Emirate of Dubai and the UAE as a whole. Al Quoz is primarily an industrial area, but is also known for its contemporary art galleries, shops, theaters, and restaurants.

It is bordered to the north by Al Wasl, Business Bay, and MBR City, to the south by Al Barsha and Dubai Hills, to the east by Nad Al Sheba, and to the west by Umm Al Sheif, Al Manara, and Al Safa, forming a long rectangle between Al Khail and Sheikh Zayed roads.

== Etymology ==
Al Quoz derives its name from Arabic, where "Al" means "the" and "Quoz" (قوز) refers to a barchan, a type of crescent-shaped sand dune formed by wind. These dunes are typical in desert regions and reflect the area's original desert landscape prior to development. The name Al Quoz may also have a potential Persian etymology. In Persian, the word "قوز" (Quoz) can mean "hump" or "elevation", similar to its Arabic meaning.

== History ==
Al Quoz originated as a small settlement centered around a natural pond, historically serving as a watering point for Bedouin tribes and desert travelers. In the early 20th century, it functioned primarily as an agrarian area, with residents engaged in farming and livestock rearing.

During the 1970s and 1980s, Al Quoz was designated by the Dubai government for industrial development. Its strategic location between Sheikh Zayed Road and Al Khail Road facilitated its emergence as a key logistics and manufacturing hub, with a concentration of factories, warehouses, and labor accommodations.

In the late 1990s, the district began to develop a parallel identity as a cultural centre. The Courtyard, established in 1998, and Alserkal Avenue, launched in 2008 within a former warehouse complex, marked the beginning of Al Quoz's role in the arts sector. These spaces have since become prominent venues for contemporary art, performance, and creative industries.

In 2021, the Dubai government announced the Al Quoz Creative Zone to support the growth of the cultural economy.

== Organization ==
Al Quoz consists of a mainly residential area in the northeast and an industrial area in the southwest with four subcommunities each.

The residential areas of Al Quoz 1, 2, and 4 are home to mainly Emirati families. The newest of them, Al Quoz 2, is an ex-landfill south of Al Khail road towards Meydan and is the only area outside the rectangle. It hosts Al Quoz Pond Park and borders the newly built MBR City. On 12 January 2024, Al Quoz 2 got renamed "Ghadeer Al Tair". Al Quoz 3 is mainly industrial.

Al Quoz industrial areas 1, 2, 3, and 4 are in the southwest of the rectangle and are being developed by Dubai Municipality as an industrial and mass accommodation area. There are a number of car showrooms in the Al Quoz Industrial Area 1.

== Population ==
Map of boroughs in Al Quoz

As of the latest data from the Dubai Statistics Centre, the total population of Al Quoz is approximately 355,356.

Borough	Population
Al Quoz 1	23,088
Al Quoz 2 (Ghadeer Al Tair)	6,103
Al Quoz 3	57,045
Al Quoz 4	23,471
Al Quoz Industrial 1	37,309
Al Quoz Industrial 2	139,444
Al Quoz Industrial 3	23,157
Al Quoz Industrial 4	45,739
Al Quoz	355,356

== Economy ==
Al Quoz plays a critical role in Dubai's diversified economy, functioning as one of the city's principal industrial and commercial zones. Strategically located between Sheikh Zayed Road (E11) and Al Khail Road (E44), the district is divided into residential sectors—Al Quoz 1 to 4—and industrial sectors—Al Quoz Industrial Areas 1 to 4. This geographic segmentation supports a broad spectrum of economic activities, from heavy manufacturing and logistics to creative industries and retail.

According to a report issued by the Business Registration & Licensing (BRL) sector of Dubai Economy, Al Quoz is home to approximately 12,437 registered and active businesses as of the latest data. Of these, 73% are classified under commercial activities, 20% under professional services, and the remainder in tourism and industrial operations. The highest concentration of active licenses is found in Al Quoz 3, Al Quoz 1, and Al Quoz Industrial Area 2, which collectively account for 59% of the district's businesses.

The legal structures of these enterprises reflect Dubai's broader business environment, with Limited Liability Companies (LLCs) representing 68% of licenses, followed by Sole Establishments (21%) and Civil Companies (6%). The remainder includes a variety of forms such as branches of companies based in other emirates or countries, one-person LLCs, general partnerships, and branches of free zone entities.

The industrial zones of Al Quoz contain a dense network of factories, warehouses, and workshops, including sectors focused on construction materials, metal fabrication, textiles, plastic molding, printing, food processing, and bottling. The area hosts major facilities such as the Dubai Refreshments (PepsiCo) bottling plant, which supplies soft drinks across the UAE and GCC region, and several automotive-related businesses including parts suppliers, modification garages, and showrooms.

The commercial corridor along Sheikh Zayed Road, on the western edge of Al Quoz, is also a significant contributor to the local economy. It includes flagship dealerships for major automotive brands such as Tesla, BMW, Nissan, and Toyota, alongside high-end used car showrooms and automotive service centers. These establishments cater to both individual consumers and corporate fleets, reinforcing Dubai's status as a regional automotive hub.

In recent years, Al Quoz has emerged as a focal point for Dubai's growing creative economy. The launch of the Al Quoz Creative Zone in April 2021 formalized this shift. Spearheaded by the Government of Dubai, the initiative aims to transform the area into a global hub for creative industries by 2025, in alignment with directives from Sheikh Mohammed bin Rashid Al Maktoum. The zone encompasses sectors such as publishing, film, design, fashion, architecture, gaming, and software development. Infrastructure enhancements, regulatory incentives, and streamlined licensing processes are intended to attract artists, designers, and entrepreneurs from around the world.

== Al Quoz Creative District ==
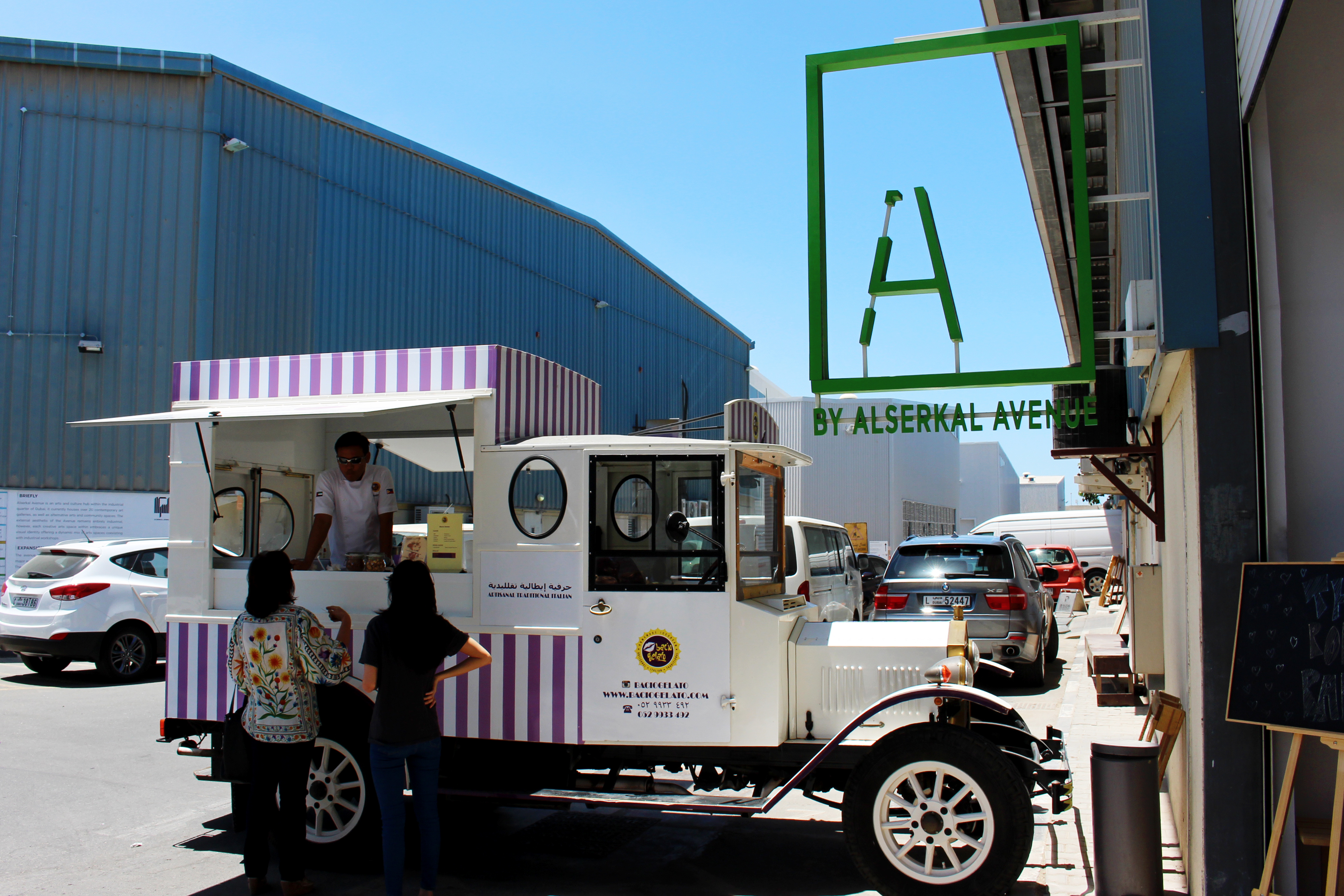
Bacio Gelato Food Truck in Alserkal Avenue, Al Quoz

The government of Dubai launched the Al Quoz Creative District as part of the Dubai 2040 cityplan; it will serve as a one‑stop shop and free zone area for creative‑related services, and as a centre for issuing relevant business permits and visas.

The new zone will be an integrated development, with multipurpose spaces for artists, designers, and other creatives to live, work, exhibit, and sell their products. Suitable operatives registered in the new zone will be eligible for the Al Quoz Creative membership programme that will provide benefits such as exemptions on import, export, and visa issuance fees; licensing fees; and Dubai Chamber of Commerce and Industry fees. Other incentives will include low rents and logistical business support. For entrepreneurial start‑ups, training programmes will also be available to help in turning creative ideas into businesses.

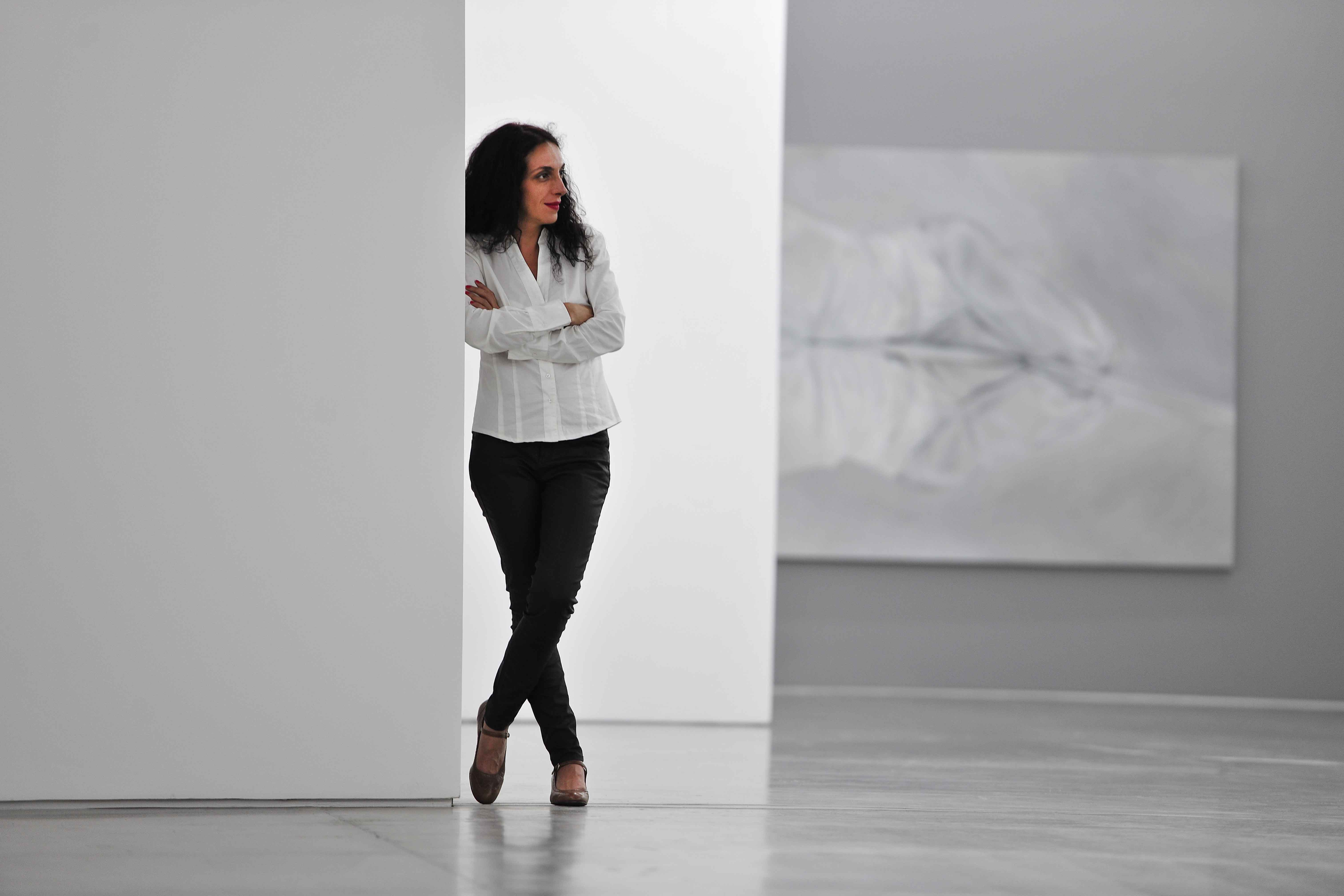
Pantea Rahmani at Salsali Private Museum, Al Quoz

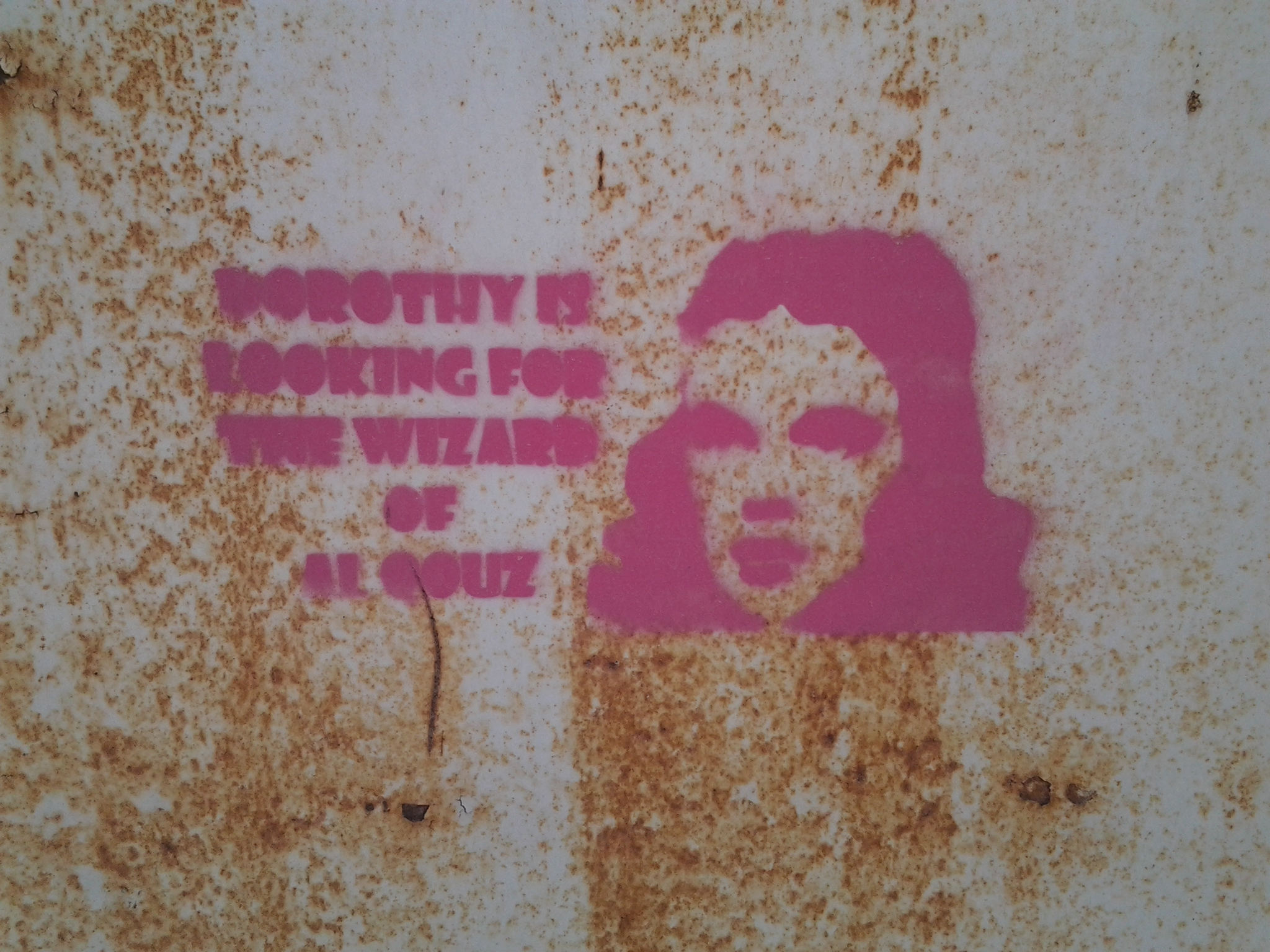
Graffiti on a side street in Al Quoz

Creative fields targeted for the district include writing, publishing and print; audio‑visual media, such as cinema, music, and video; and artistic and cultural industries, such as historic‑site‑related, cultural heritage museums, libraries, and major cultural events. Video gaming and software industries will also be encouraged, along with the full sweep of commercial design including fashion, gaming, software, and architecture.

The project is the first of a number of government initiatives launched under the Dubai Creative Economy Strategy that seeks to improve Dubai's attractiveness to creators, entrepreneurs, investors, and local and global investments in creative industries. The goal is to transform the emirate into a global capital for innovation by 2025.

== Quoz Arts Fest ==
The Quoz Arts Fest is an annual arts and culture festival held in Al Quoz, Dubai. Established in 2012 by Alserkal Avenue, the festival has evolved into one of the Middle East's prominent cultural events, attracting over 35,000 visitors annually.

Spanning two days each January, the festival activates Alserkal Avenue and the surrounding Al Quoz Creative District, featuring a diverse program that includes art exhibitions, live music performances, film screenings, workshops, talks, and culinary experiences. Notable installations have included works by international and regional artists, such as immersive experiences by Australian studio ENESS and site-specific interventions by Brazilian artist Zé Tepedino.

The festival emphasizes community engagement and accessibility, offering activities suitable for all ages, including dedicated children's programming.

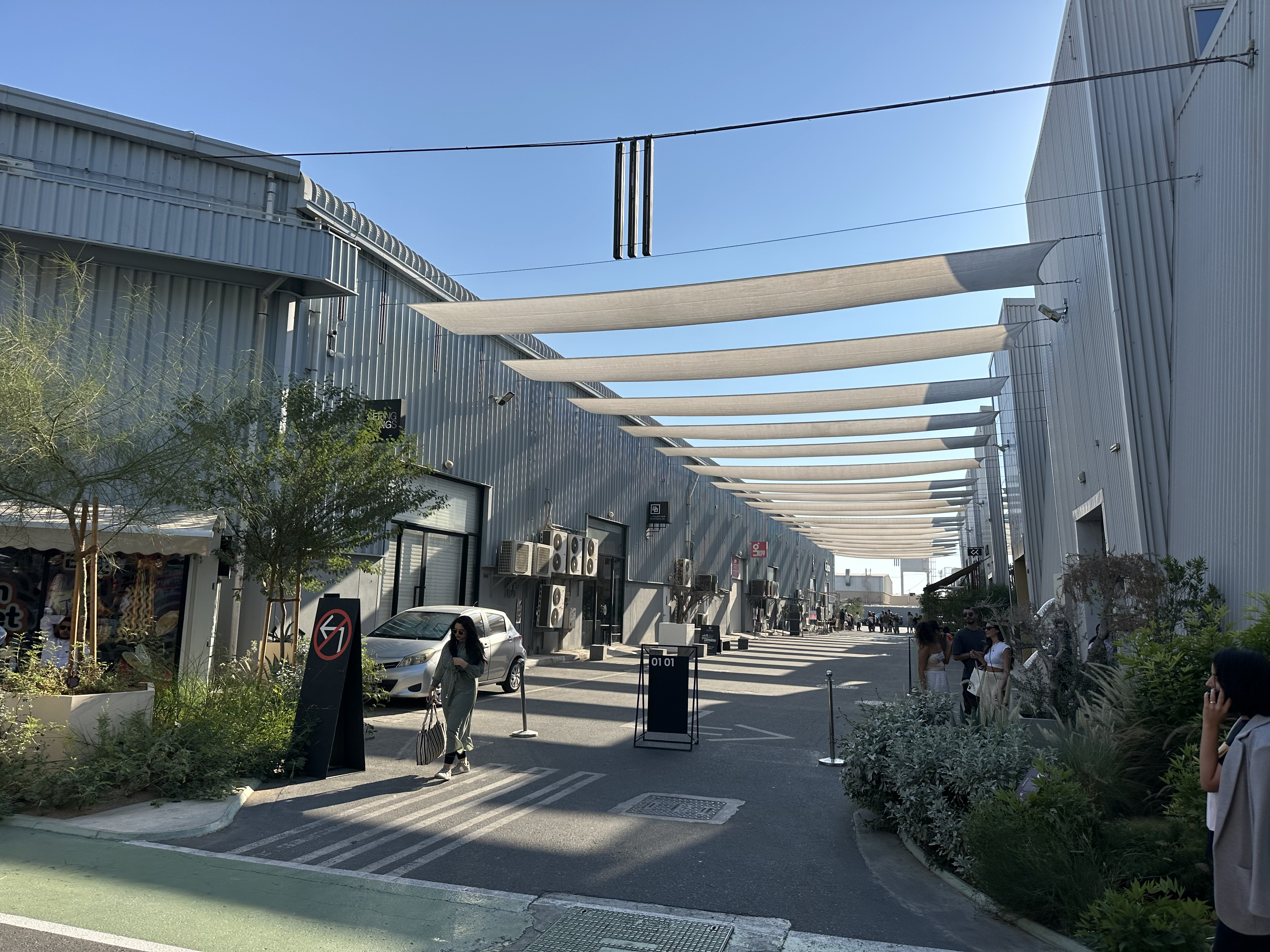
Alserkal Avenue, Al Quoz

== Attractions and landmarks ==
Al Quoz features a diverse array of cultural, recreational, and commercial attractions that reflect its transformation from an industrial district into a creative and leisure-oriented hub.

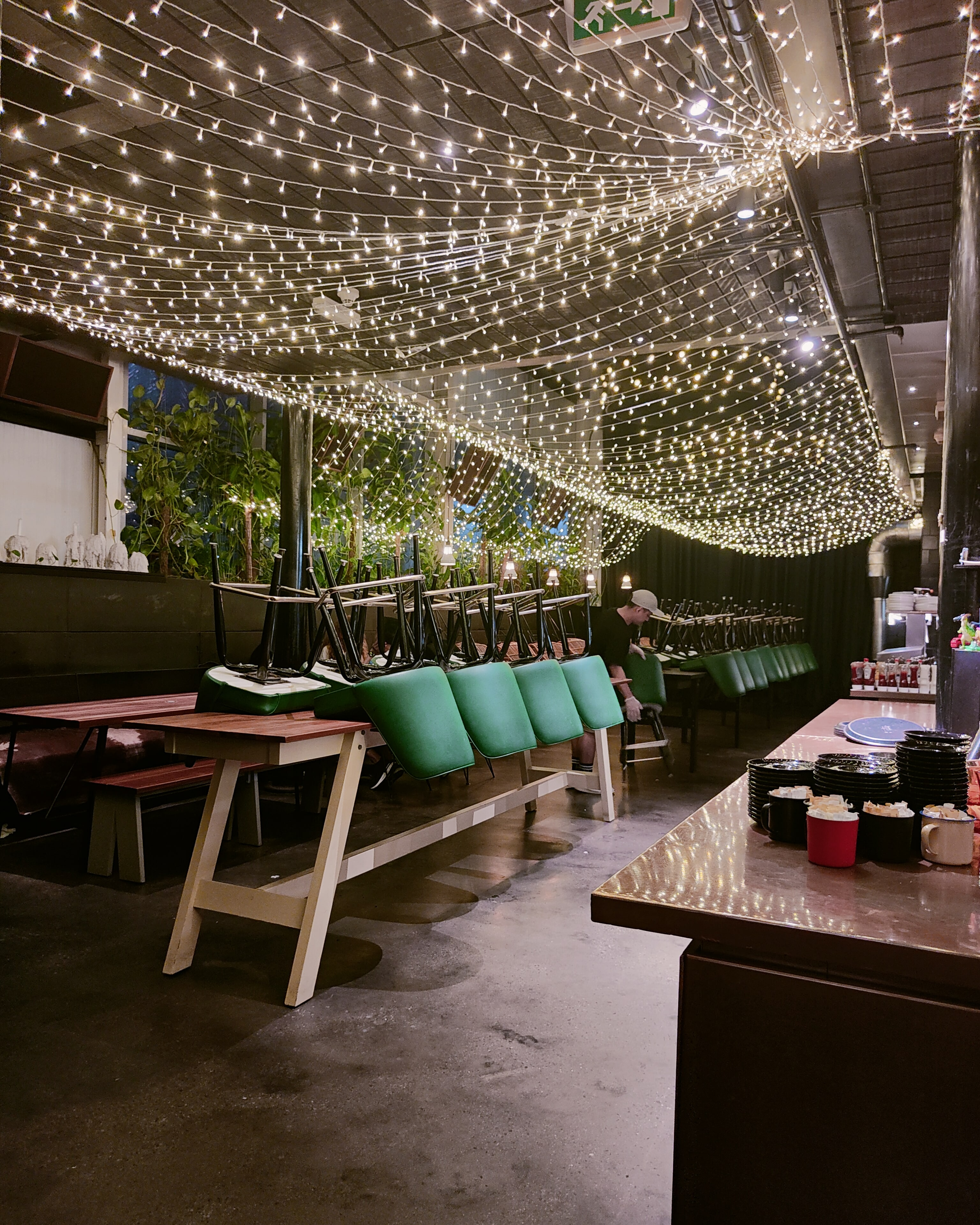
Christina Pravi, Al Quoz

Alserkal Avenue, a prominent cultural quarter, houses contemporary art galleries, creative studios, performance venues, and independent cafes. Within the complex, Cinema Akil operates as the GCC's first independent arthouse cinema, while The Junction offers a space for multilingual theatre productions, stand-up comedy, and live music. The Flip Side, also located in Alserkal, is the UAE's first independent record store, catering to vinyl collectors and music enthusiasts.

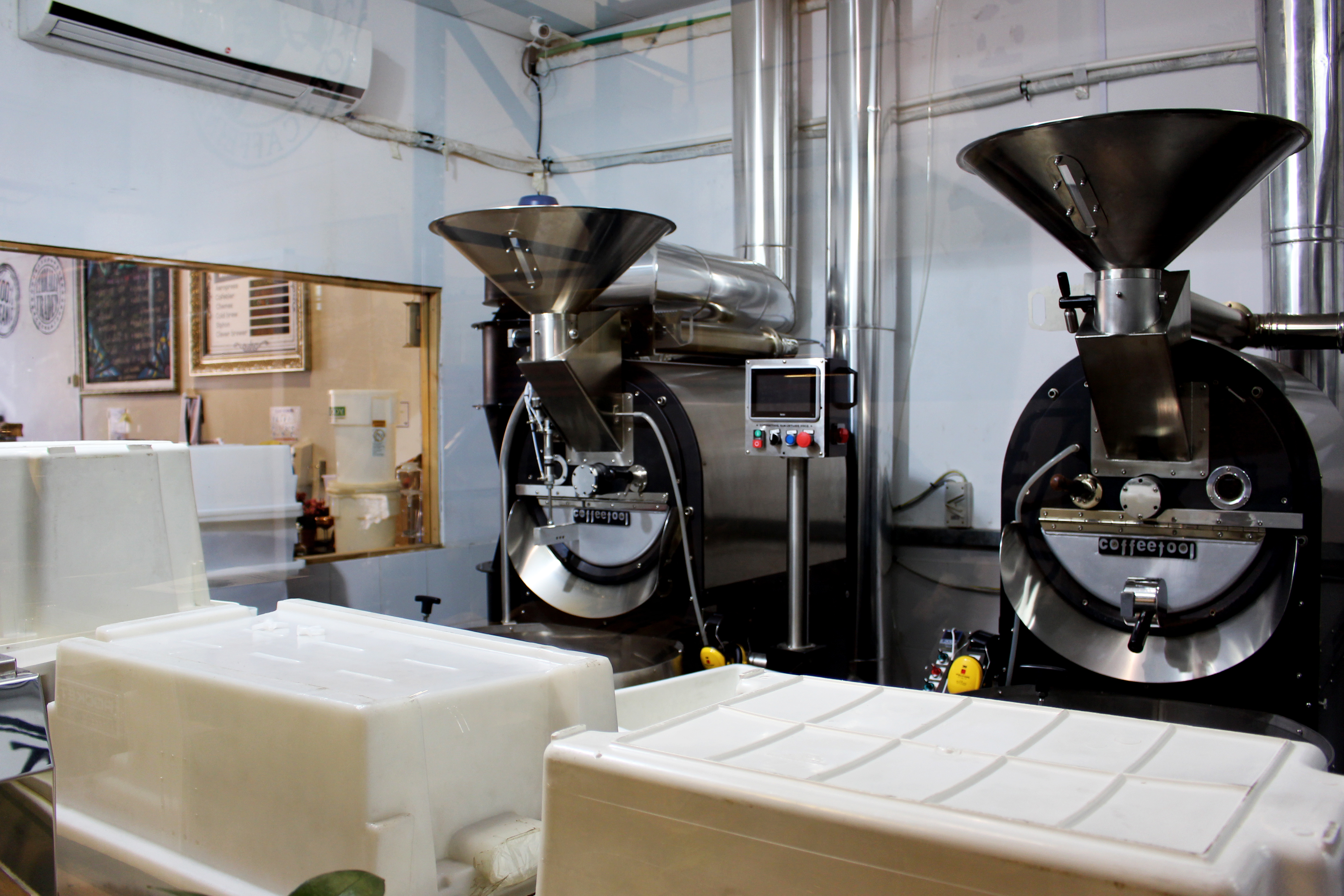
Raw Coffee, Al Quoz

Adjacent to Alserkal is The Courtyard, a mixed-use arts and community space established in 1998 that includes design studios, cafes, and exhibition venues. It is also home to The Courtyard Playhouse, a performing arts theatre focused on improvisational and interactive productions.

Recreational facilities in Al Quoz include the Dubai Bowling Center, an entertainment complex with bowling lanes and arcade games, and Al Quoz Pond Park (Ghadeer Al Tair), a public park offering walking tracks, green spaces, and playgrounds. Family-oriented attractions include OliOli, a children's experiential play museum, and Bounce Dubai, an indoor trampoline park. The Smash Room provides an alternative leisure activity where visitors can safely break objects for stress relief. Al Quoz is also home to the Dubai Little League Park, a dedicated baseball facility that has served as a hub for youth baseball and softball in the UAE since the early 1990s.

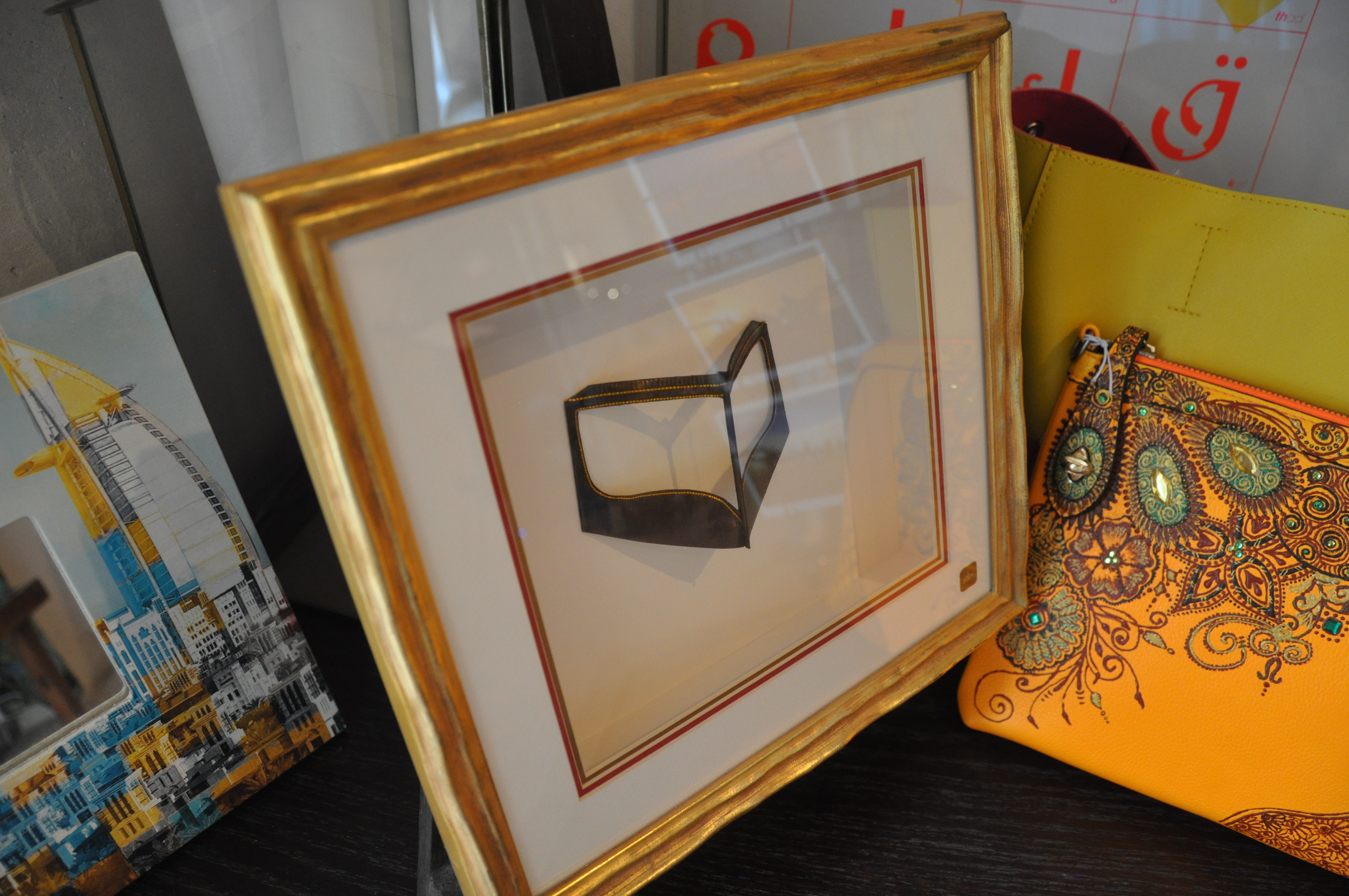
Alserkal Cultural Foundation

Retail destinations include Times Square Center and Oasis Mall, both offering a range of shops, dining options, and entertainment facilities. Specialty venues such as Nostalgia Classic Cars exhibit vintage automobiles, while Art of Guitar serves musicians with a curated selection of instruments and accessories. Al Quoz is also known for its concentration of automobile showrooms and service centers along the stretch bordering Sheikh Zayed Road. This corridor includes a range of international car dealerships.

Al Quoz also features a growing number of cafes, shopping and concept spaces. The JamJar, a community-focused art studio, offers workshops, exhibitions, and public access to creative resources.

== Education ==
Al Quoz hosts several educational institutions catering to its diverse population. Jumeira University offers undergraduate and graduate programs in business, health sciences, and Islamic studies. International schools in the area include Lycée Français Jean Mermoz, following the French curriculum; GEMS Our Own Indian School and Springdales School, which follow the Indian CBSE curriculum; and Oaktree Primary School, offering a British curriculum. The Towheed Iranian Boys School provides education based on the Iranian national curriculum. In addition, the district contains public Emirati schools managed by the UAE Ministry of Education, serving the local Emirati community.

== Incidents ==
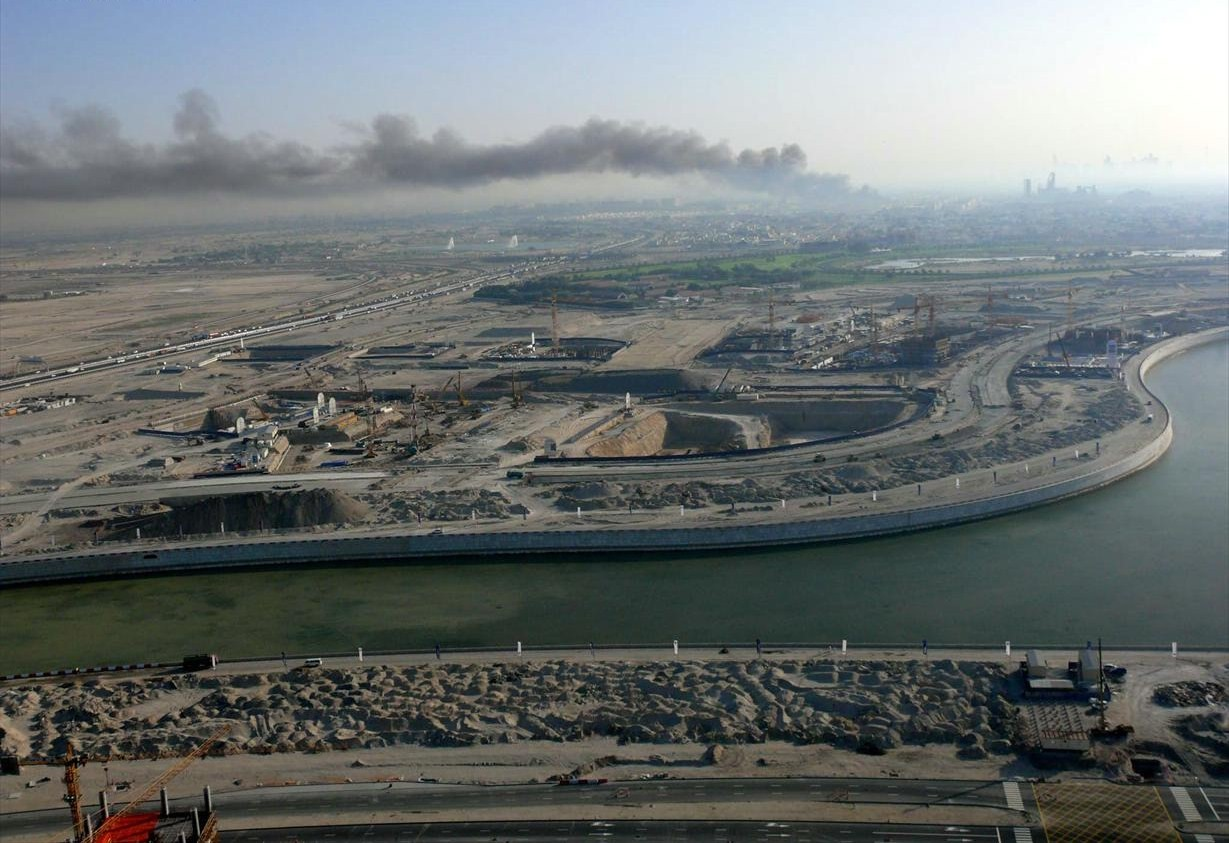
Explosion at a warehouse in Al Quoz on 26 March 2008

In March 2007, labourers from Al Quoz Industrial rioted, as part of a larger 8,000 strong protest against contracting companies, demanding better living conditions and a wage increase of 200 dirhams (US$55) and a food allowance of 50 dirhams (US$14) per month.

On 26 March 2008, an explosion ripped through two warehouses in Al Quoz industrial killing at least two people. The explosion originated from a warehouse storing gas and subsequently ignited a warehouse next door containing fireworks. Flames from the explosion spread to seventy warehouses nearby, causing at least AED 600,000,000 ($170 million) of damage. Debris from the gas warehouse and fireworks warehouse landed as far away as the communities of Al Safa and Jumeirah. This was the seventh industrial accident in Al Quoz in five years.

On 25 April 2022, a worker in Al Quoz industrial was sentenced to life in jail for killing his employer who rejected his leave request to travel back home. The 23-year-old man, who worked at a garage in Al Quoz Industrial area, had a heated argument with his manager before slitting his throat with a sharp knife and then smashing his head with a hammer.

In May 2025, Al Quoz Industrial 1 experienced two separate warehouse fires within a short period. The first fire broke out on April 30, leading to significant smoke but no reported injuries. The following day, a second fire occurred in a nearby warehouse storing flammable materials. Dubai Civil Defence teams responded promptly to both incidents, containing the fires and preventing their spread to adjacent facilities.
