= Mohammed Bin Rashid City =

Planned mixed-use development in Dubai

Coordinates: 25°07′00″N 55°17′18″E

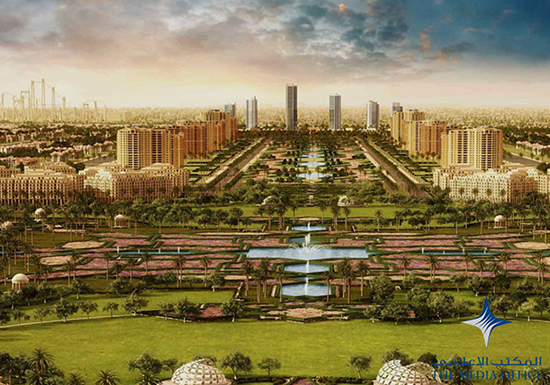
View of MBR City

Mohammed Bin Rashid City, also known as MBR City, is a planned mixed-use development in Dubai, United Arab Emirates.

== History ==
In November 2012, the Ruler of Dubai, Mohammed bin Rashid Al Maktoum, announced the establishment of what he termed a new "city" within Dubai. The complex was to contain four components:

- Family tourism, including a park established in collaboration with Universal Studios, with an annual capacity of 35 million visitors and more than 100 hotel facilities, the largest family leisure and entertainment complex in the Middle East, Africa, and Indian subcontinent;
- Retail, featuring the largest mall in the world, the Mall of the World, with 750,000 m^{2}. of air-conditioned space;
- Arts, including the largest area for art galleries in the MENA region; and
- Entrepreneurship and innovation.

The drawings showed the allocated land for the development to be bordered by Emirates Road, Al Khail Road and Sheikh Zayed Road. The complex would also include Mohammad bin Rashid Gardens and the Downtown Dubai, Burj Khalifa, and Business Bay developments.

In 2013, Meydan and Sobha began development of District One, a low-density luxury residential estate within MBR City, as the first phase of development. Crystal Lagoons also began construction of a 40-hectare lagoon, the world's largest man-made lagoon.

In 2016, it was announced that the Mall of the World would be relocated away from the city to the Al Suhouf district of Dubai, opposite the Mall of the Emirates.

In 2019, a 7-bedroom villa in District One was sold for AED 90 million (US$24.5 million), making it the most expensive real estate property sold in Dubai.

== See also ==
- Dubai Hills
