= Alserkal Avenue =

Industrial compound in Dubai, UAE

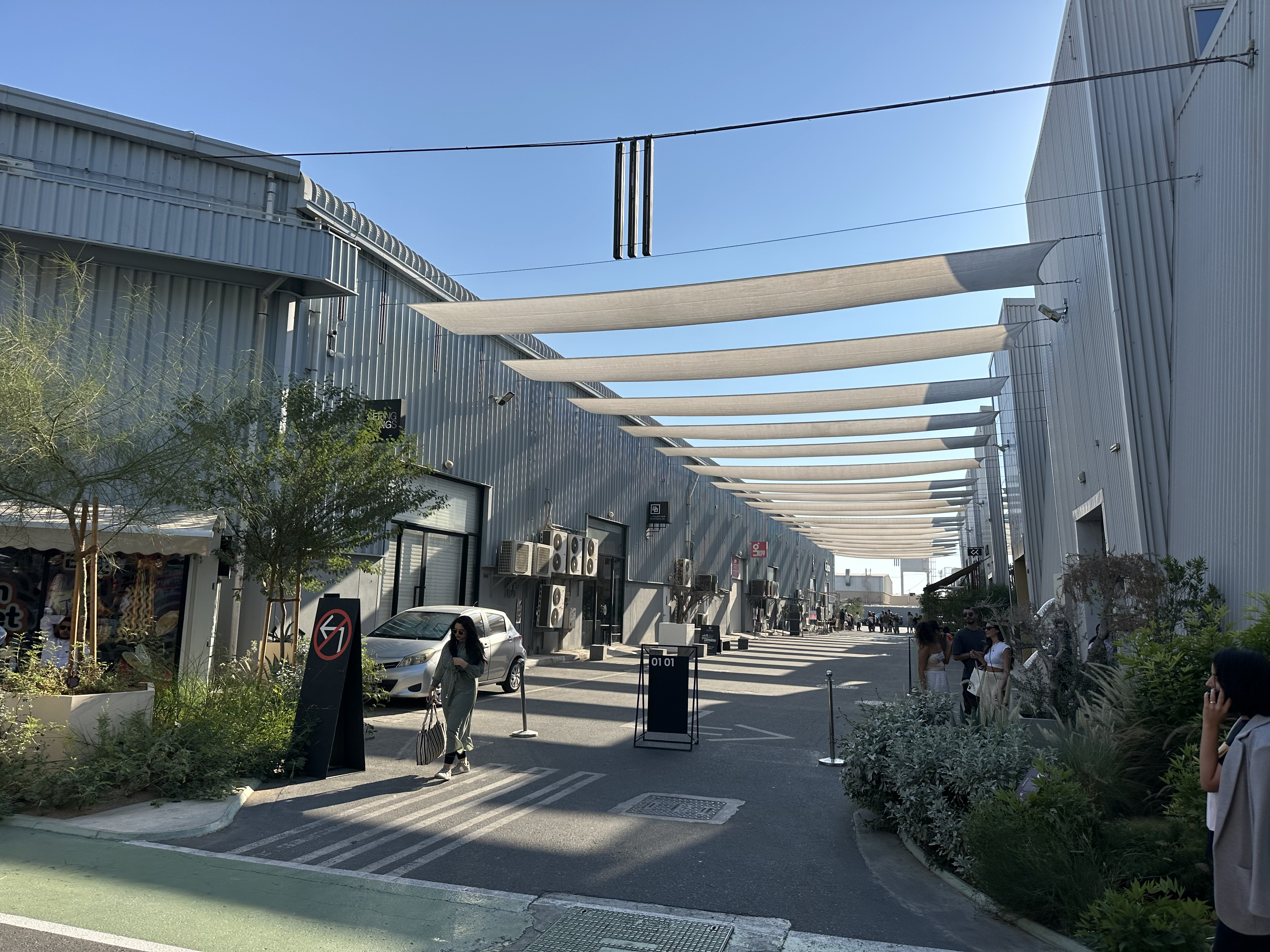
- Alserkal Avenue in 2024
- Founded: 2008
- Location: 17th Street, Al Quoz, Dubai, UAE 25.1421°N 55.2255°E
- Founder: Abdelmonem Bin Eisa Alserkal
- Website: Official Website

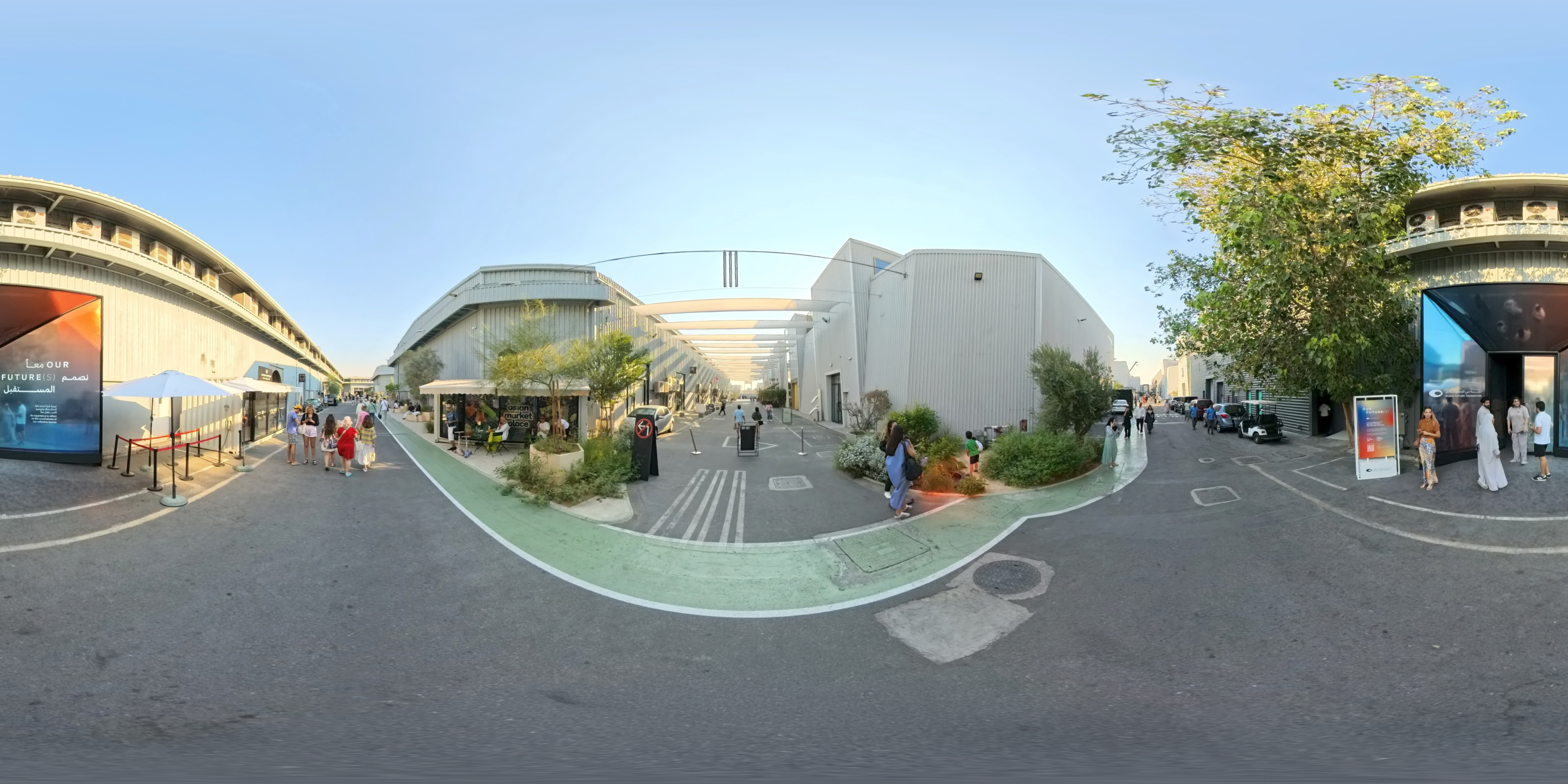
Alserkal Avenue in 2024 (view as a 360° interactive panorama)

Alserkal Avenue is an industrial compound hosting warehouses in the industrial zone of Al Quoz, in Dubai. The area is an arts and culture district for Dubai with lineup of galleries, facilities and platforms, such as Alserkal Avenue that houses residencies for local and global artists. In March 2017, Alserkal Avenue inaugurated Concrete (Alserkal Avenue), its new space in the Avenue and the first project to be completed in the United Arab Emirates by the Office for Metropolitan Architecture (OMA), founded by Pritzker Architecture Prize Laureate Rem Koolhaas.

== History ==
Originally an industrial area consisting of thirty-nine warehouses, the district evolved naturally, with the first contemporary art gallery, Ayyam Gallery, moving into the district in 2008. The original warehouses have since been converted into art galleries, design studios, a private museum and a performing arts space.

After Carbon 12 Dubai, one of the most active contemporary art galleries of the region, moved to Alserkal Avenue in October 2009, other modern art galleries followed, and the industrial compound's function evolved to become a "focal point of artistic activity."

Alserkal Avenue is now a mix of industrial business and creative spaces. It now houses more than 60 art, design and creative venues that include foundations, private collections and community projects. It is home to twenty-five contemporary art galleries and arts spaces in a one-block radius, the highest concentration of art galleries in one area in the region.

Galleries in Alserkal Avenue are distinct and characterized by individual arts and culture programs that represent emerging, mid-career and established artists as well as hosting exhibitions, talks, panel discussions, young collector's auctions and community events.

In March 2012, the area's developer, Abdelmonem Bin Eisa Alserkal, announced plans to double the size of the art district, adding 62 units of varying sizes to the existing 39, and also adding an events centre and additional parking, giving the district a total area of 92,000 square metres (990,000 sq ft). By September 2012 Alserkal Avenue had 20 art spaces and the Al Quoz neighborhood had a total of 33. The expansion was completed in 2015, doubling Alserkal's square footage to about 500,000. The same year, it launched is programming arm to support local talent, focusing primarily on artists from the Middle East, North Africa and South Asia.

Two contemporary art galleries from the district, Gallery Isabelle van den Eynde and Green Art Gallery, were selected to participate in Art Basel in the Art Statements section, "for the first time in the history of the region".

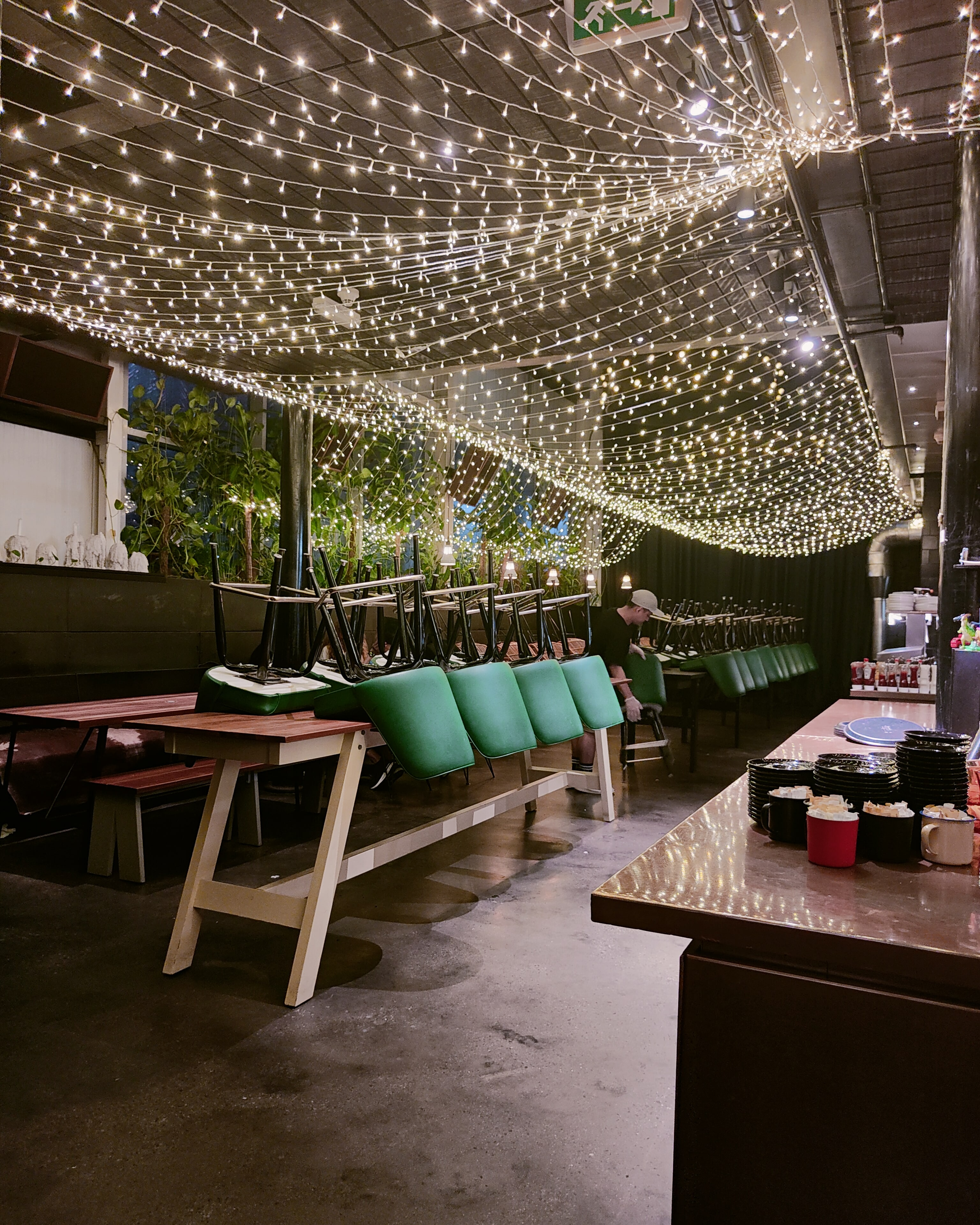
A café in Alserkal avenue, at closing time, 2023

In 2022, Alserkal organised the Quoz Arts Fest, which welcomed 40,000 visitors over two days and offered close to 200 activations. These included contemporary art exhibitions, outdoor art installations, culinary experiences and educations seminars. This was with the aim of demonstrating the variety of arts available in the UAE.

== Alserkal Arts Foundation ==
In March 2019, a new Alserkal Arts Foundation was announced by Alserkal Avenue's Founder, Abdelmonem Bin Eisa Alserkal, and Director, Vilma Jurkute. The foundation was to funnel the artistic endeavors that until now had operated under Alserkal Avenue, notably, the Art Residency Program and the Public Art Commissions. It is supported by Abdelmonem Bin Eisa Alserkal, Ahmad Bin Eisa Alserkal and the Alserkal family and focuses on not-for-profit initiatives.

=== Artist Residency Program ===
Since 2018, Alserkal Avenue has been running an art residency program. The Spring and Fall cycles are invitation only for artists operating globally. The Summer cycle is selected from a pool of applicants from the MENA-South Asia Region.

Members of the Selection committee include: Pierre Belanger, Filipa Ramos, Raja'a Khalid, César García-Alvarez, iLiana Fokianaki, and Monica Narula.

=== Public Art Commissions ===
Since the opening of Alserkal Avenue, a number of internationally acclaimed artists have been commissioned public artworks, such as Vikram Divecha, Mary Ellen Carroll, METASITU and Farah Alqasimi.
