= List of communities in Dubai =

Sectors of Dubai

This is a list of communities in Dubai, United Arab Emirates. Dubai is mainly divided into 19 sectors which are then divided into 224 communities, which are listed below.

== Corniche Deira ==
Bridge to Dubai Islands

This sector develops on the northern coastal area of Dubai, on the north bank of Dubai Creek. It is west of the historic sector of Deira and has an artificial island. With a population of approximately 3,194 residents on an area of just under 102.3 km^{2}, it is the most densely populated sector (density of approximately 3,950 inhabitants/km^{2}).

Community Name	Arabic Name	Area (km^{2})	Population (2022)
Nakhlat Deira	نخلة ديرة	99.6	2
Al Hamriya Port	ميناء الحمرية	1.2	507
Corniche Deira	كورنيش ديرة	0.9	15
Al Corniche	الكورنيش	0.6	2,670

== Deira ==
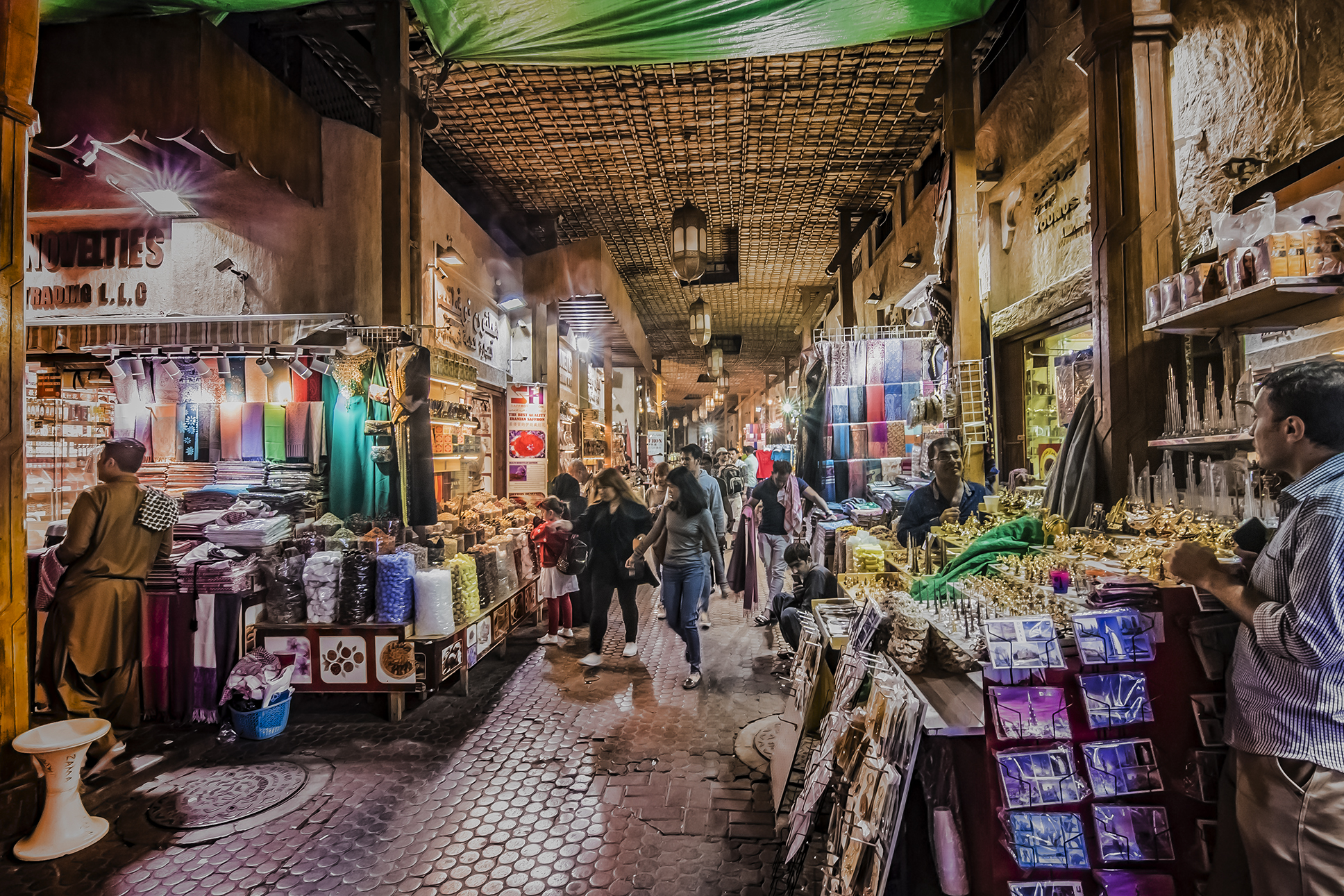
Spice Souq in Deira

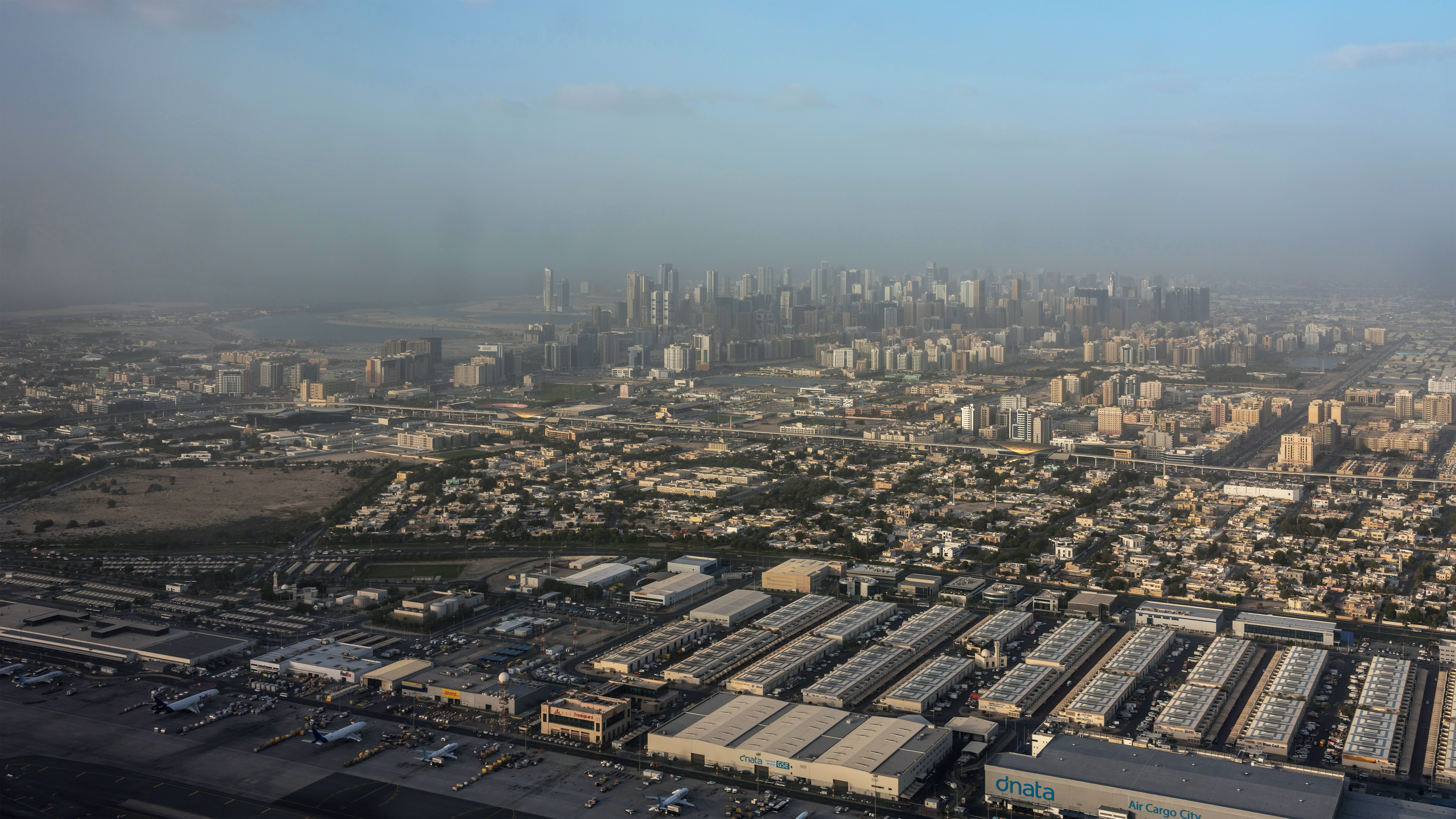
The view of Dubai International Airport facing north to Sharjah.

This sector develops on the northern coastal area of Dubai, on the north bank of Dubai Creek and on the border of Sharjah. It corresponds to the historic district of Deira and its artificial island. Within its territory are some of Dubai's most populous neighborhoods and communities, including Al Nahda and Al Qusais. Dubai International Airport. With a population of approximately 494,000 residents on an area of just under 125 km^{2}, it is the most densely populated sector (density of approximately 3,950 inhabitants/km^{2}).

Community Name	Arabic Name	Area (km^{2})	Population (2022)
Al Mamzar	الممزر	5.8	16,901
Al Nahda First	النهدة الأولى	1.7	32,757
Al Qusais Ind. Third	القصيص الصناعية الثالثة	0.9	2,802
Al Qusais Ind. Fourth	القصيص الصناعية الرابعة	0.7	2,865
Al Qusais Ind. Fifth	القصيص الصناعية الخامسة	2.4	2,722
Al Nahda Second	النهدة الثانية	2.2	64,458
Al Qusais Ind. First	القصيص الصناعية الأولى	1.4	10,813
Al Qusais Ind. Second	القصيص الصناعية الثانية	1.7	9,410
Muhaisanah Fourth	محيصنة الرابعة	2.3	35,861
Muhaisanah Third	محيصنة الثالثة	1.8	6,865
Al Qusais	القصيص	2.7	48,378
Al Twar Fifth	الطوار الخامسة	1.8	12,851
Al Twar Fourth	الطوار الرابعة	2.3	7,513
Al Wuheida	الوحيدة	1.4	21,686
Hor Al Anz East	هور العنز شرق	1.4	22,143
Al Twar First	الطوار الأولى	2.6	14,403
Al Twar Second	الطوار الثانية	1.1	5,184
Al Twar Third	الطوار الثالثة	3.0	11,185
Abu Hail	أبو هيل	1.3	18,116
Hor Al Anz	هورالعنز	1.8	85,080
Al Baraha	البراحة	1.0	26,115
Al Muteena	المطينة	1.1	49,276
Al Murar	المرر	0.4	40,456
Ayal Nasir	عيال ناصر	0.2	20,139
Naif	نايف	0.7	53,403
Al Daghaya	الضغاية	0.2	16,873
Al Ras	الراس	0.3	8,143
Al Buteen	البطين	0.1	3,081
Al Sabkha	السبخة	0.1	4,291
Al Rigga	الرقة	0.7	11318
Al Muraqqabat	المرقبات	1.5	73,879
Al Khabaisi	الخبيصي	1.2	2,042
Dubai Int'l Airport	مطار دبي الدولي	14.2	121
Riggat Al Buteen	رقة البطين	0.8	7,687
Port Saeed	بور سعيد	2.7	14,425
Al Garhoud	القرهود	4.0	20,168
Umm Ramool	أم رمول	3.6	3,119
Nadd Shamma	ند شما	1.1	3,378
Al Rashidiya	الراشدية	4.8	38,408

== Bur Dubai ==
Historical neighbourhood of Al Bastakiya (Al Fahidi).

This sector develops along the north-central coastal area of Dubai, and on the southern bank of Dubai Creek and includes the localities of Al Shindagha, Madinat Dubai Al Melaheyah, and their immediate hinterland. It therefore includes the neighborhoods of Umm Hurair, Al Jafiliya, and Al Kifaf. Along the coast it includes the port area of Al Mina with Port Rashid to the west. There are no artificial islands in front of the relevant section of coast are also part of the sector. It is the most populous sector of Dubai with a presence of over 1,200,000 residents (2021 data).

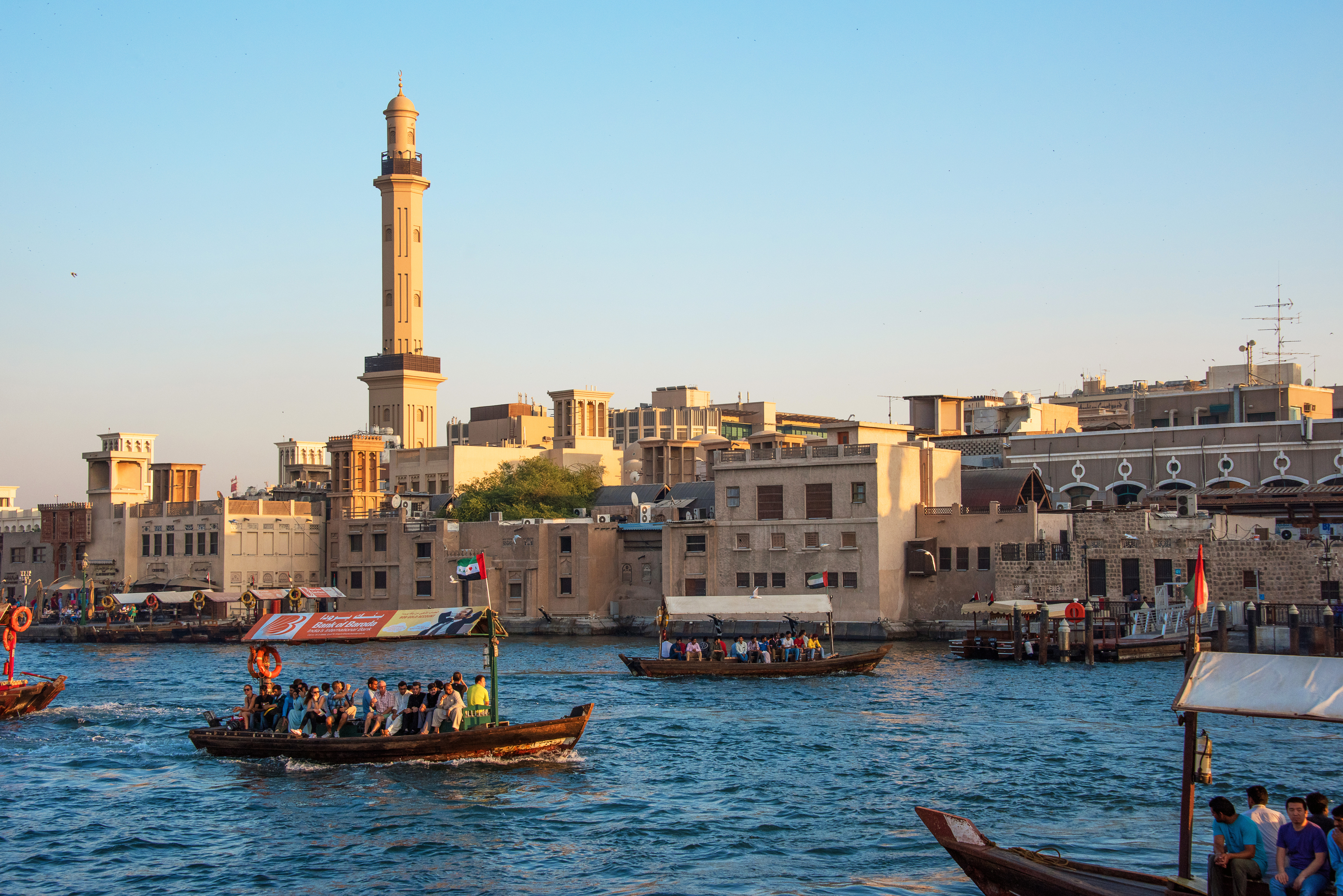
Bur Dubai from the view in Dubai Creek

Community Name	Arabic Name	Area (km^{2})	Population (2021)
Madinat Dubai Al Melaheyah	مدينة دبي الملاحية	22.1	8,391
Al Shindagha	الشندغة	0.3	7
Al Souq Al Kabeer	السوق الكبير	0.9	52,439
Al Hamriya	الحمرية	0.8	38,215
Umm Hurair First	أم هرير الأولى	1.0	6,482
Umm Hurair Second	أم هرير الأولى	3.4	5,633
Al Raffa	الرفاعة	1.2	48,546
Mankhool	منخول	2.0	41,244
Al Karama	الكرامة	2.1	76,591
Oud Metha	عود ميثاء	1.5	15,568
Al Hudaiba	الحضيبة	0.9	14,504
Al Jafiliya	الجافلية	1.7	25,033

== Ras Al Khor ==
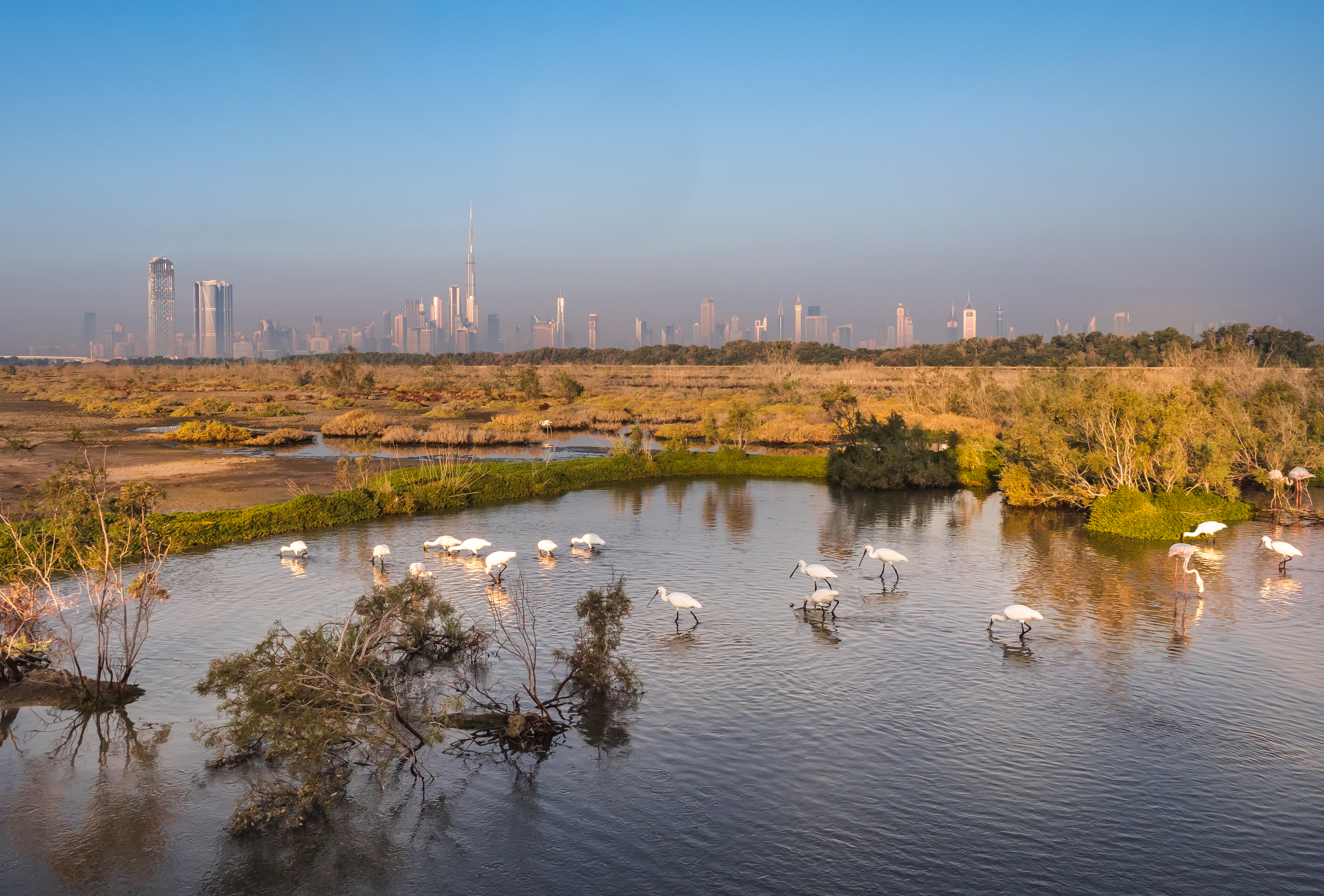
Ras Al Khor Wildlife Sanctuary with the Dubai Skyline

This sector develops in the west-north-central area of Dubai. It includes the Ras Al Khor area with its protected nature reserve and the territories east of that area. The communities of Al Kheeran, Al Kheeran First, and Al Jadaf, and the areas south of them after Ras Al Khor of Ras Al Khor Industrial Area, Bu Kadra, and Nadd Al Shiba therefore fall within it. It is the smallest of Dubai's sectors with an area of just 61.8 km^{2}.

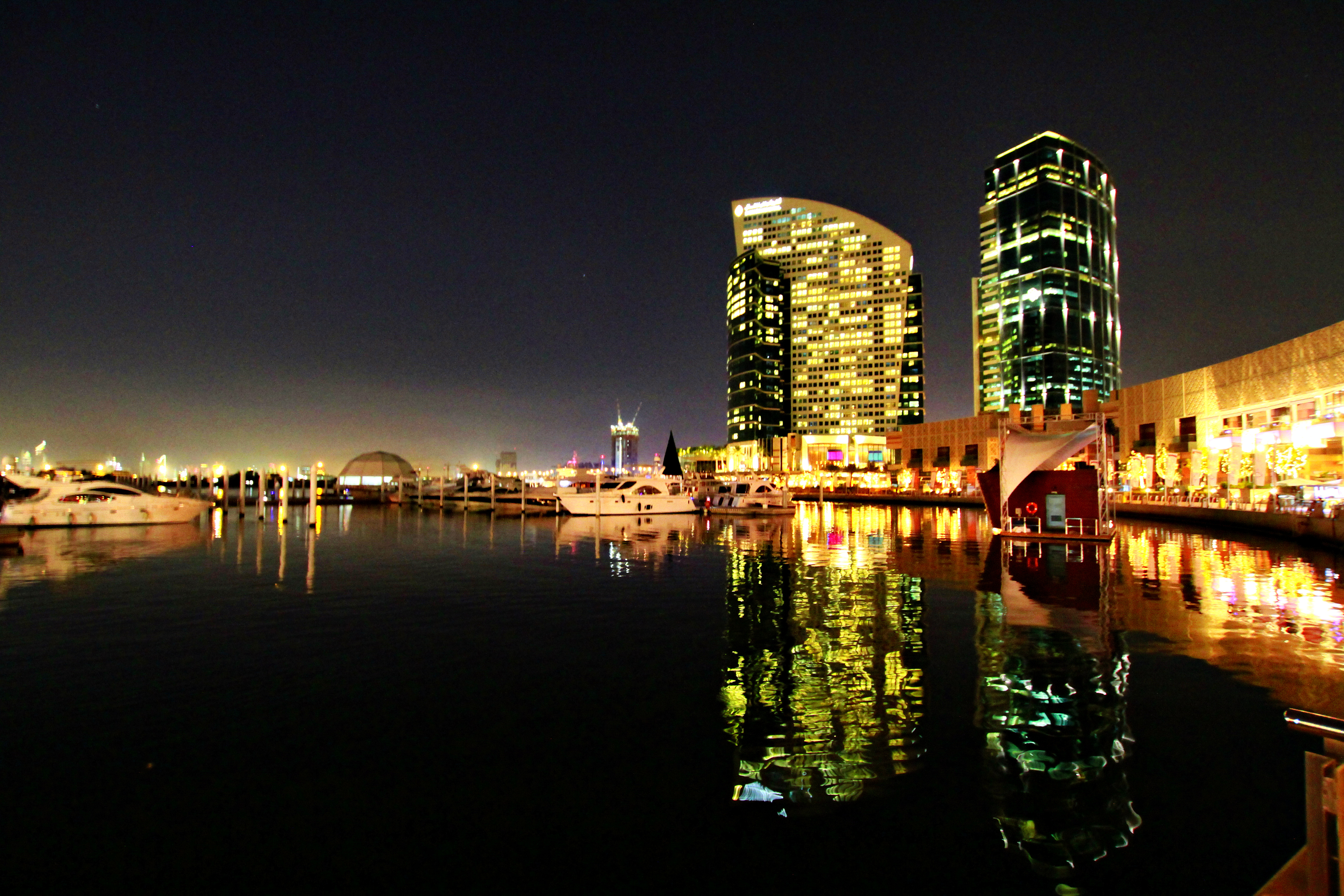
Dubai Festival City

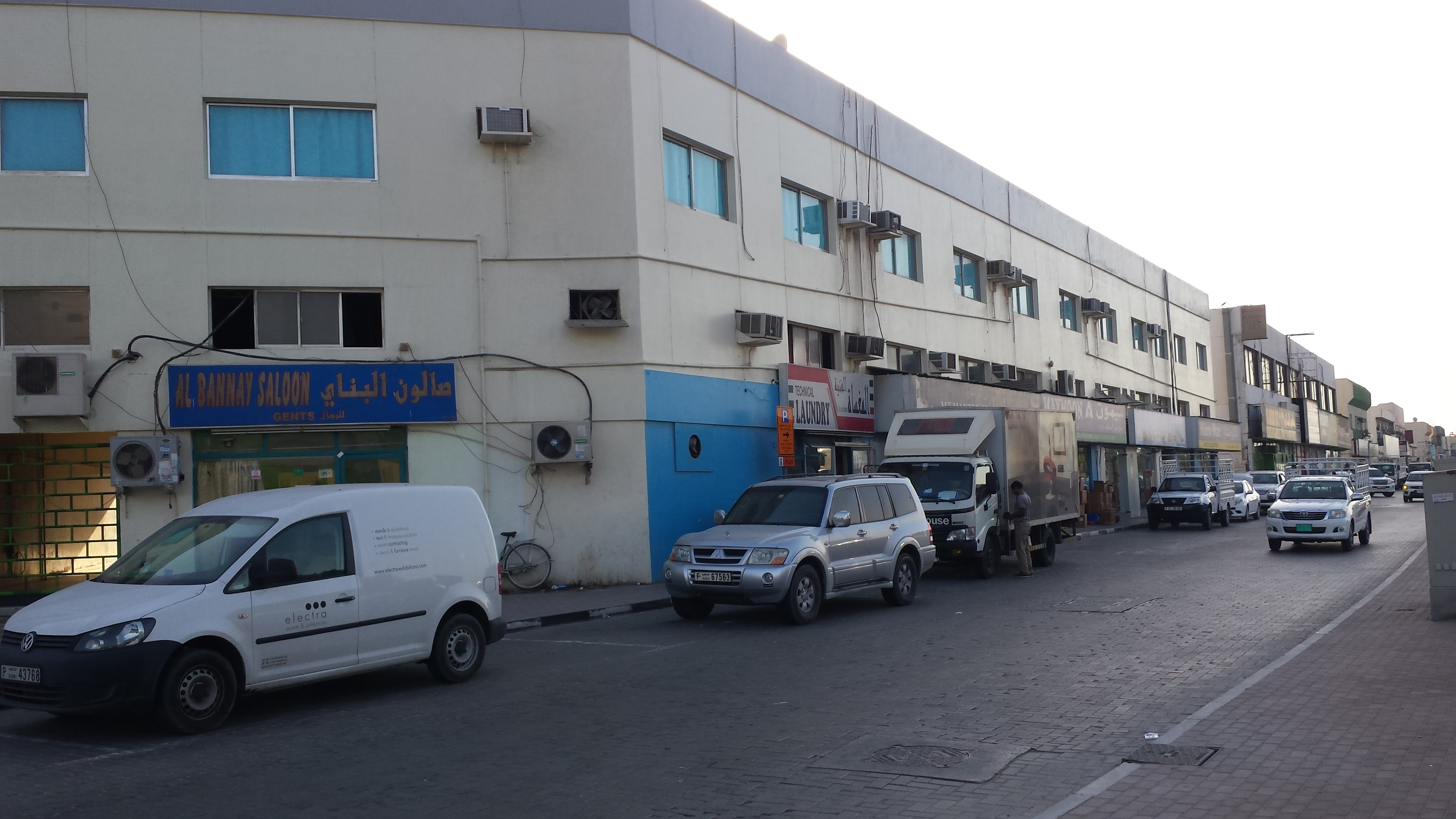
Ras Al Khor Industrial Area 1.

It is bordered, in broad terms, by Sheikh Mohammed Bin Zayed Road (E 311) to the east, by Dubai-Al Ain Road (E 66) to the south, by Sheikh Rashid Road (E 11), to the west and from Al Rebat Street (D 83) to the north.

Community Name	Arabic Name	Area (km^{2})	Population (2021)
Al Jadaf	الجداف	7.2	6,947
Al Kheeran	الخيران	6.3	5,270
Ras Al Khor	رأس الخور	7.8	2
Al Kheeran First	الخيران الأولى	7.3	2,086
Nadd Al Hamar	ند الحمر	8.3	16,930
Ras Al Khor Industrial Second	رأس الخور الصناعية الثانية	4.2	1,833
Ras Al Khor Industrial Third	رأس الخور الصناعية الثالثة	5.4	22,247
Ras Al Khor Industrial First	رأس الخور الصناعية الأولى	2.6	2,160
Bu Kadra	بو كدرة	1.7	112
Nadd Al Shiba Second	ند الشبا الثانية	7.5	2,569
Nadd Al Shiba Third	ند الشبا الثالثة	6.3	1,137
Nadd Al Shiba Fourth	ند الشبا الرابعة	6.2	3,898

== Mushraif ==
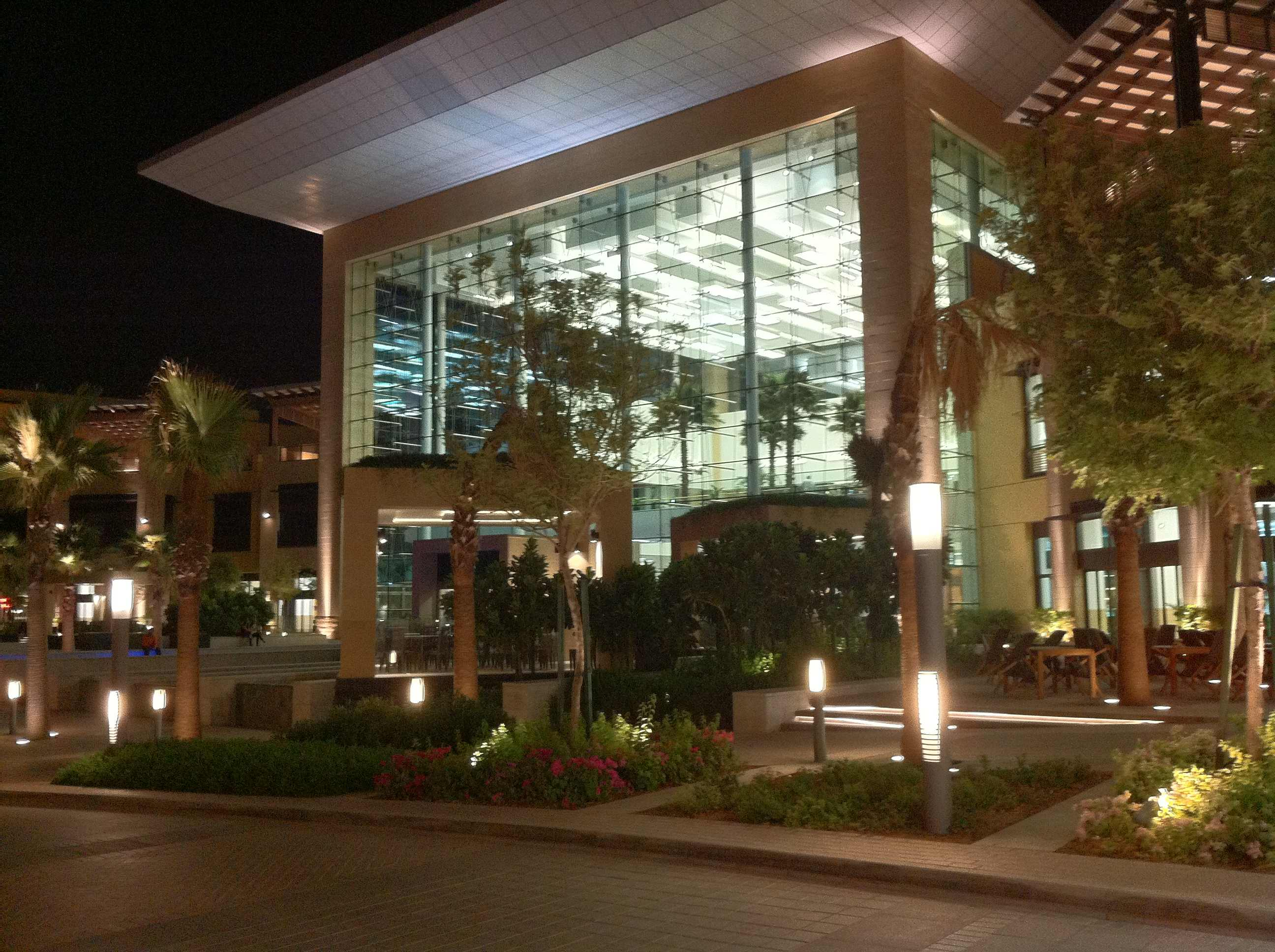
Mirdif City Center

This sector develops in the northern area of Dubai, on the border with the Emirate of Sharjah. Within its territory are some of Dubai's most populous neighborhoods and communities, including Muhaisnah, Mirdif, Al Warqa'a and Warsan. Al Khwaneej and Mushrif Public Park are also located in the sector.

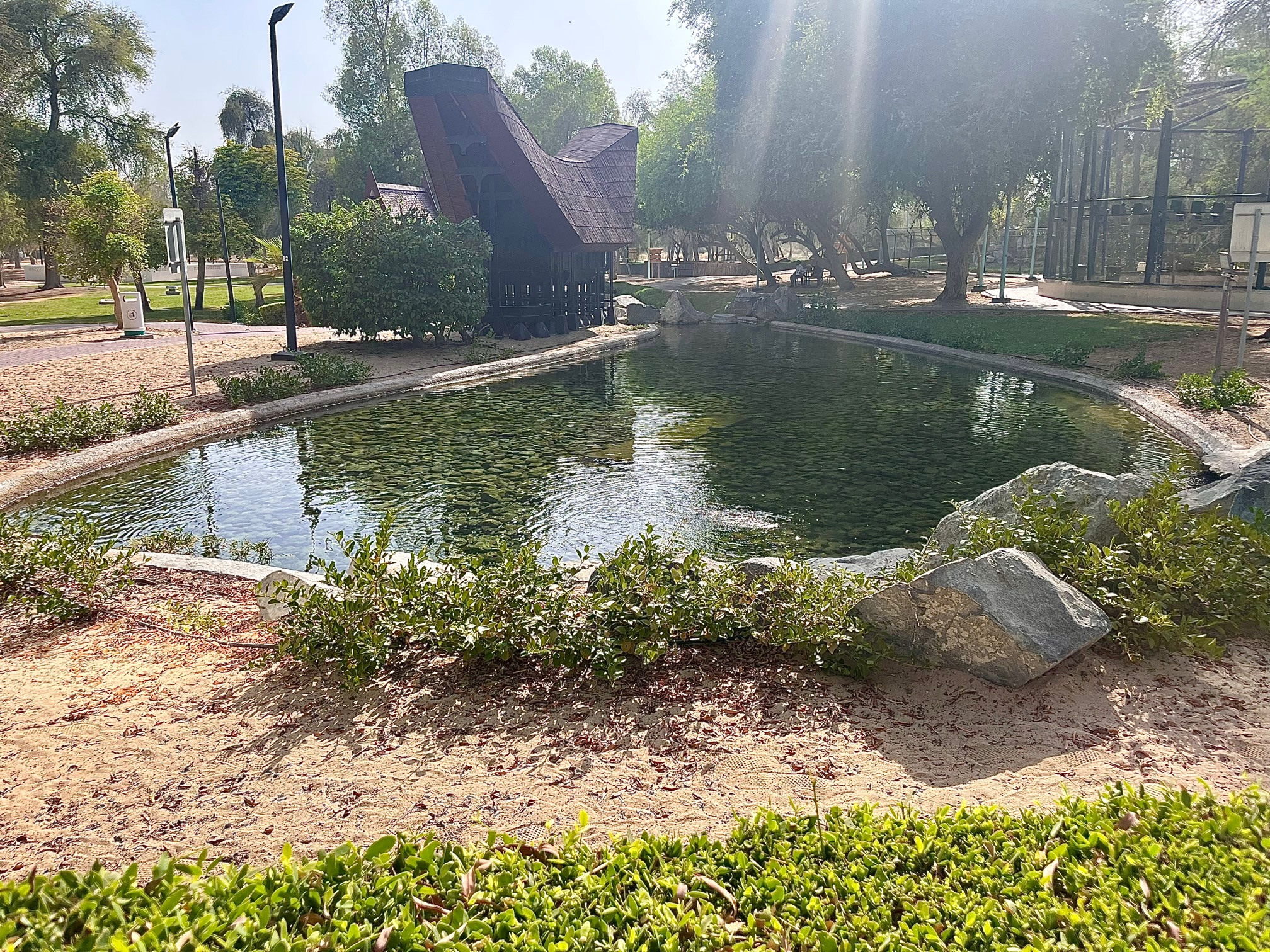
Mushrif Park

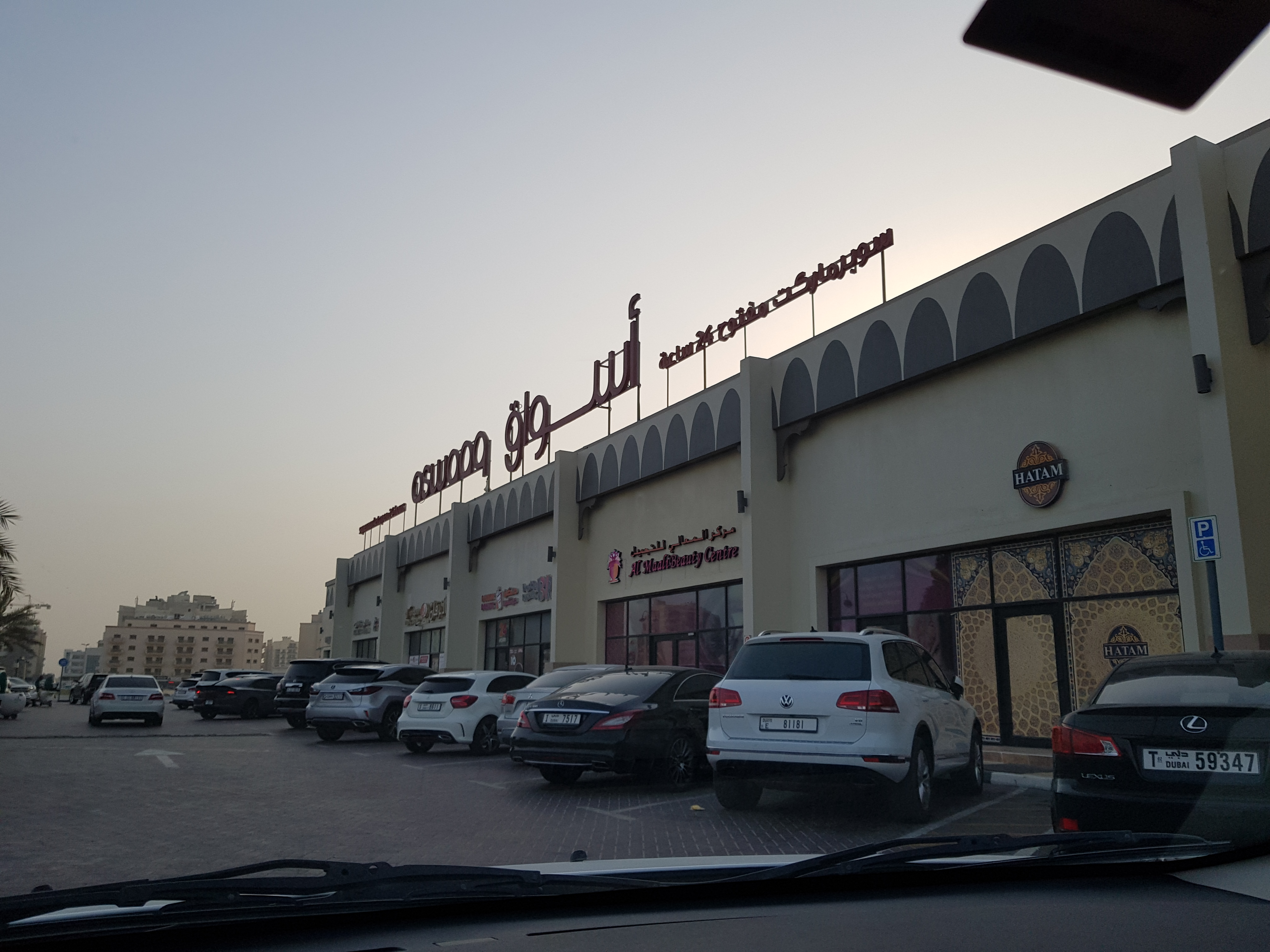
Aswaaq Mall - Al Warqa'a in 2018

Community Code	Community Name	Arabic Name	Area (km^{2})	Population (2022)
Muhaisanah Fifth	محصينة الخامسة	2.7	2	
Oud Al Muteena	عود المطينة	1.4	7,061	
Muhaisanah Second	محيصنة الثانية	5.6	148,832	
Al Mizhar Fourth	المزهر الرابعة	3.6	15,514	
Al Mizhar Third	المزهر الثالثة	2.4	5,820	
Muhaisanah First	محيصنة الأولى	5.0	8,616	
Al Mizhar First	المزهر الأولى	6.9	17,498	
Al Mizhar Second	المزهر الثانية	4.3	11,967	
Al Khwaneej First	الخوانيج الأولى	16.4	13,634	
Al Ttay	الطي	3.3	10,659	
Al Khwaneej Second	الخوانيج الثانية	12.7	5,507	
Aleyas	العياص	10.5	1,843	
Mirdif	مردف	9.4	66,736	
Mushraif	مشرف	10.5	70	
Wadi Alamardi	وادي العمردي	24.2	3,565	
Al Warqa'a Second	الورقاء الثانية	3.6	11,323	
Al Warqa'a First	الورقاء الأولى	2.4	26,405	
Al Warqa'a Third	الورقاء الثالثة	6.2	15,613	
Al Warqa'a Fourth	الورقاء الرابعة	5.1	14,308	
Al Warqa'a Fifth	الورقاء الخامسة	4.3	0	
Al Athbah	العذبة	10.5	3	
Warsan First	ورسان الاولى	8.4	108,176	
Warsan Second	ورسان الثانية	8.6	1,409	
Warsan Third	ورسان الثالثة	10.4	12,613	
Warsan Fourth	ورسان الرابعة	7.9	10,104	
Al Rowaiyah First	الرويه الأولى	11.5	3,263	
Nadd Hessa	ند حصة	9.8	40,819	
Al Rowaiyah Second	الرويه الثانية	7.5	0	

== Al Awir ==
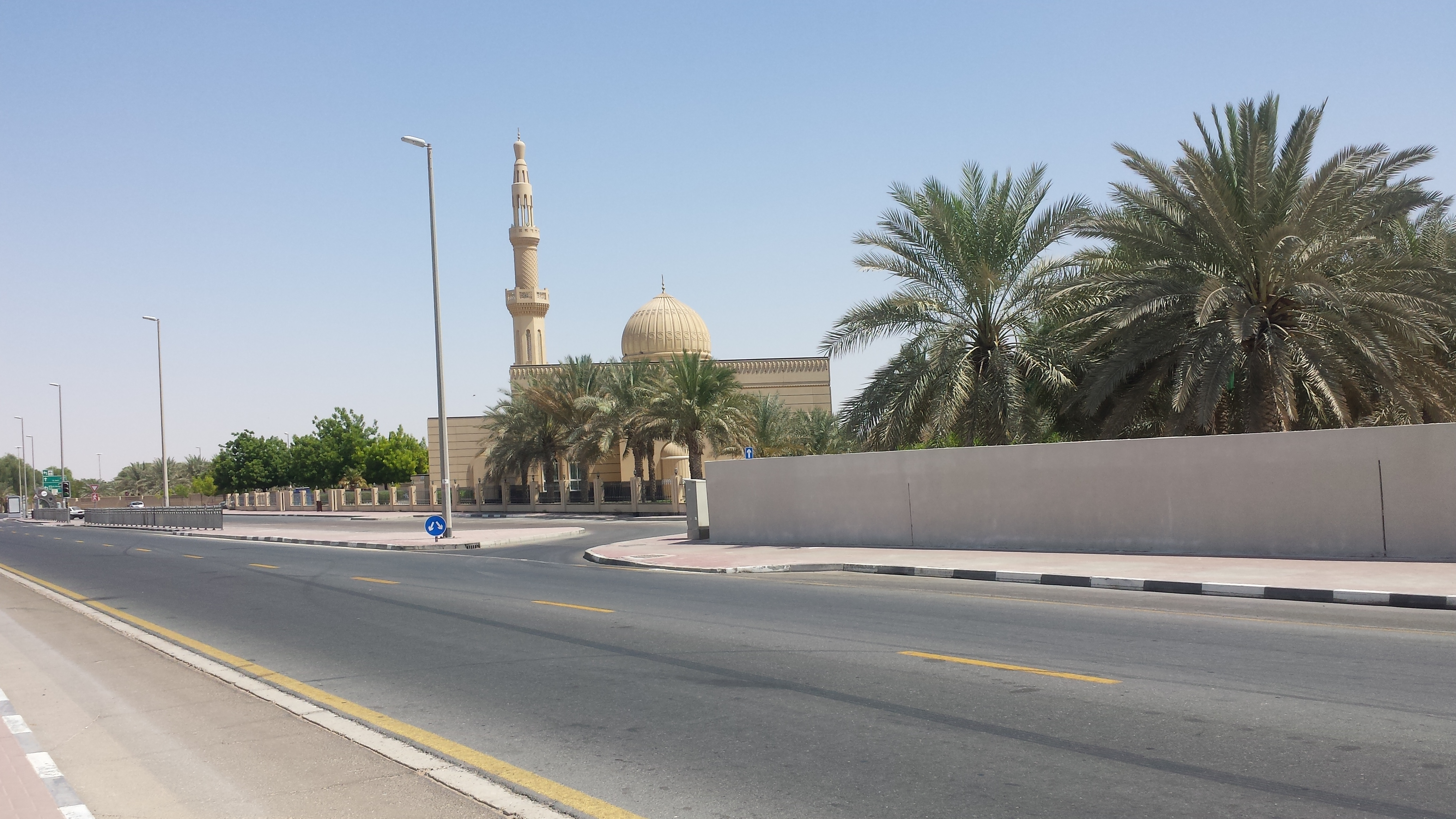
Mosque in Al Awir

This sector is located in the north-central-eastern part of the Emirate of Dubai and is bordered to the north and north by the Emirate of Sharjah. The external border is marked to the north by the Maleha Road, while the internal borders with the other sectors are marked to the west by the Emirates Road, and to the south by the Al Awir Road (E 44) which however in that stretch is called Dubai-Hatta Road.

The Sector is part of the Dubai Non-Urban Area and contains sparsely populated communities, such as Al Awir, Lehbab, Al Meryal, Al Rowaiyah, Mereiyeel, and Umm Al Daman and mostly desert and virtually uninhabited areas such as Al Wohoosh Enkhali, Le Hemaira, and Umm Al Mo'meneen. For these reasons the sector is the least populated with a presence of just over 15,000 residents (2021 data).

Community Name	Arabic Name	Area (km^{2})	Population (2021)
Al Awir First	العوير الأولى	39.7	4,488
Al Awir Second	العوير الثانية	52.4	5,874
Al Wohoosh	الوحوش	25.4	48
Al Meryal	المريال	15.5	769
Enkhali	نخلي	49.0	2
Lehbab First	لهباب الأولى	33.8	3,389
Al Meryal	المريال	15.5	769
Al Rowaiyah Third	الرويه الثالثة	60.0	4,897
Mereiyeel	مرييل	30.7	424
Lehbab Second	لهباب الثانية	63.2	1,601
Umm Al Daman	أم الدمن	35.2	299
Le Hemaira	الحميرا	36.4	56
Umm Al Mo'meneen	أم المؤمنين	32.7	169

== Margham ==
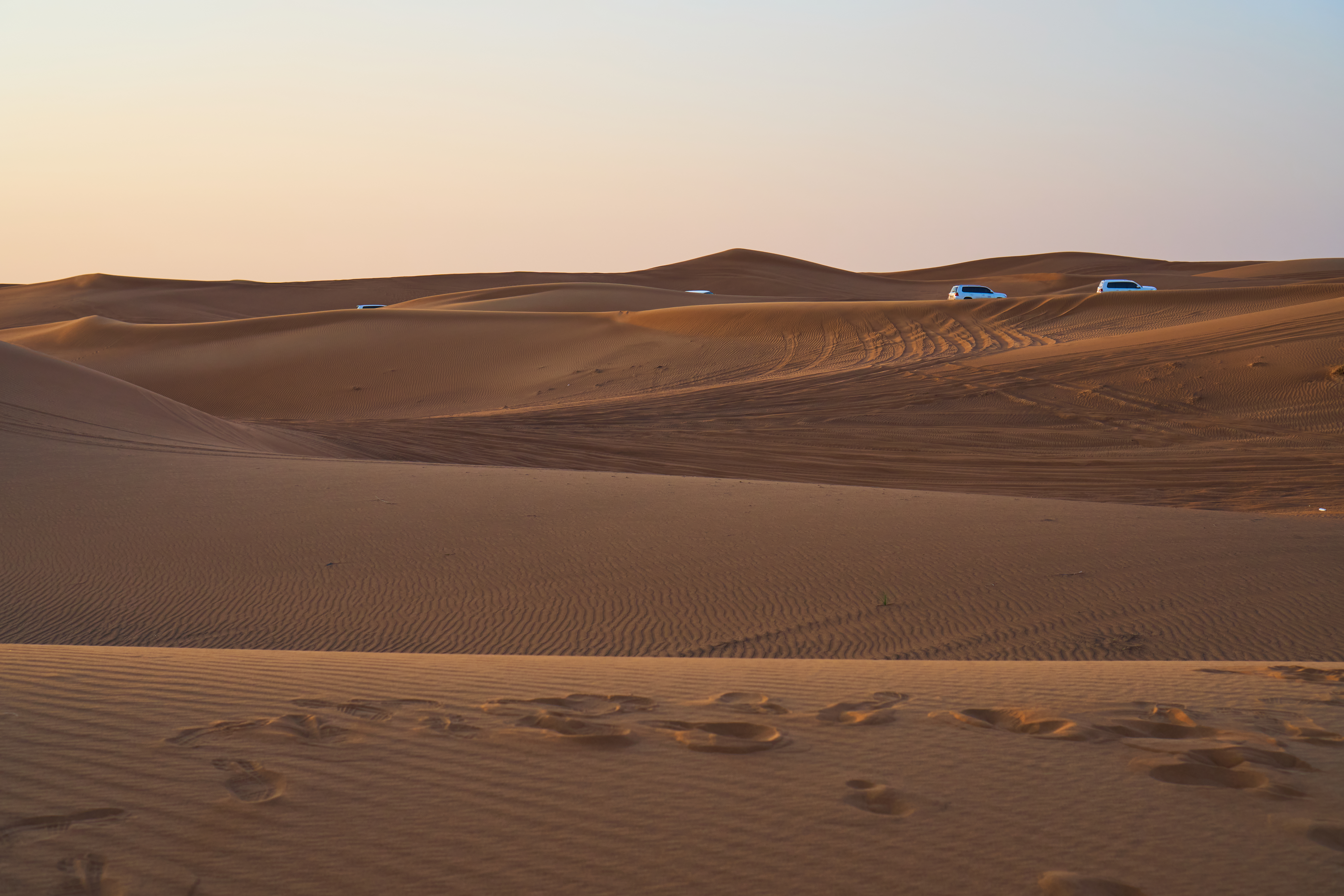
Nazwah Desert.

This sector is located in the north-eastern area of the Emirate of Dubai and borders to the east with the Emirate of Abu Dhabi and to the south with the Emirate of Sharjah. The external border to the east and south coincides with the similar borders of the Desert Conservation Reserve of Dubai, which occupies much of the southern surface of the Sector.

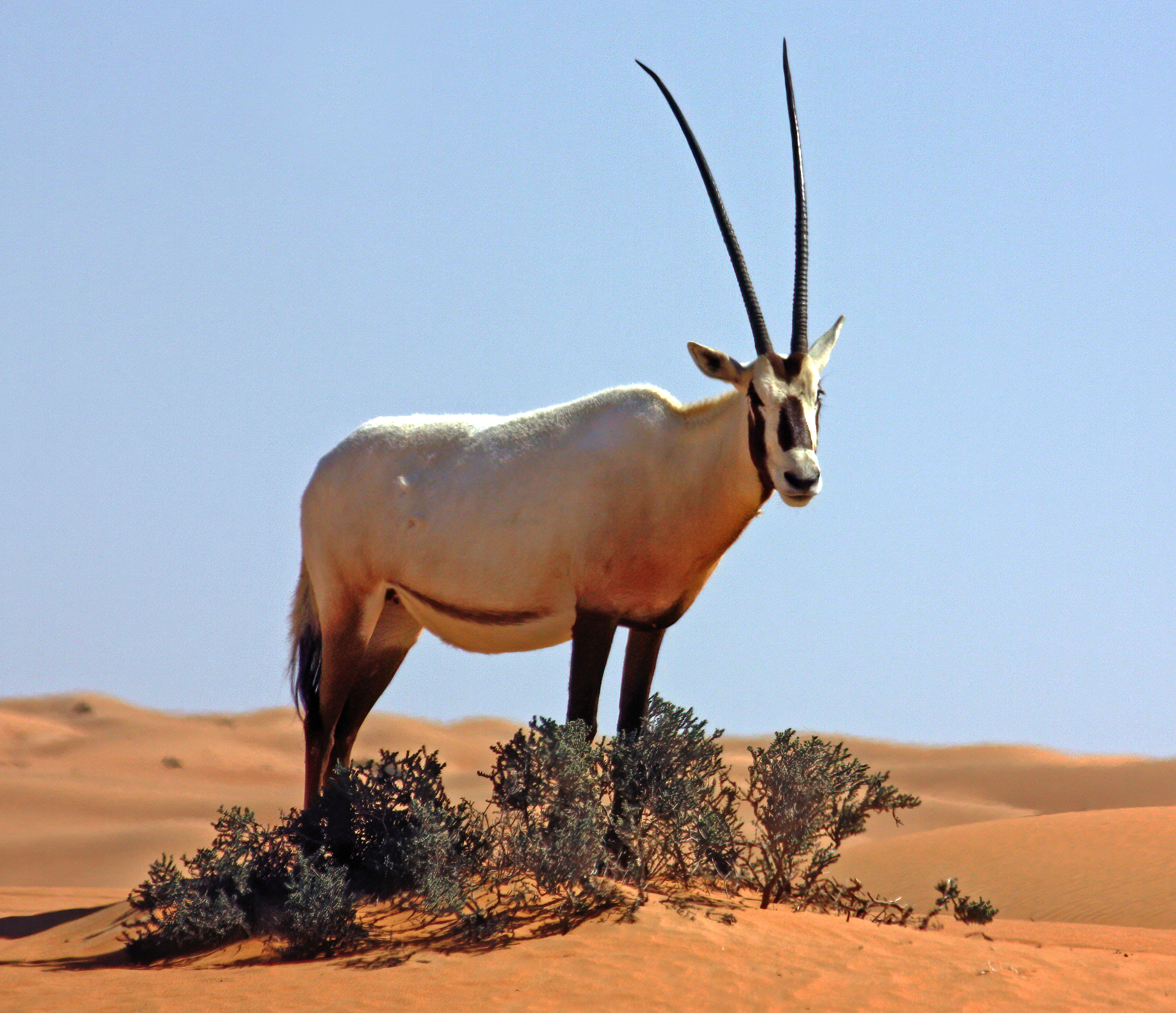
The Arabian Oryx (Oryx leucoryx) at the Dubai Desert Conservation Reserve.

Community Name	Arabic Name	Area (km^{2})	Population (2021)
Margham	مرغم	152.6	1,217
Al Maha	المها	41.7	205
Umm Eselay	أم السلي	35.2	216
Remah	رماح	82.9	195
Margab	مرقب	34.6	666
Yaraah	يراح	76.5	100

== Jumeira ==
This sector develops along the central coastal area of Dubai and includes the localities of Jumeira, Umm Suqeim, and their immediate hinterland. It therefore includes the neighborhoods of Al Safa, Al Manara, and Umm Al Sheif. Along the coast it includes the residential district of Dubai Marina to the south. All the artificial islands in front of the relevant section of coast are also part of the sector. It is the most populous sector of Dubai with a presence of over 1,200,000 residents (2021 data).

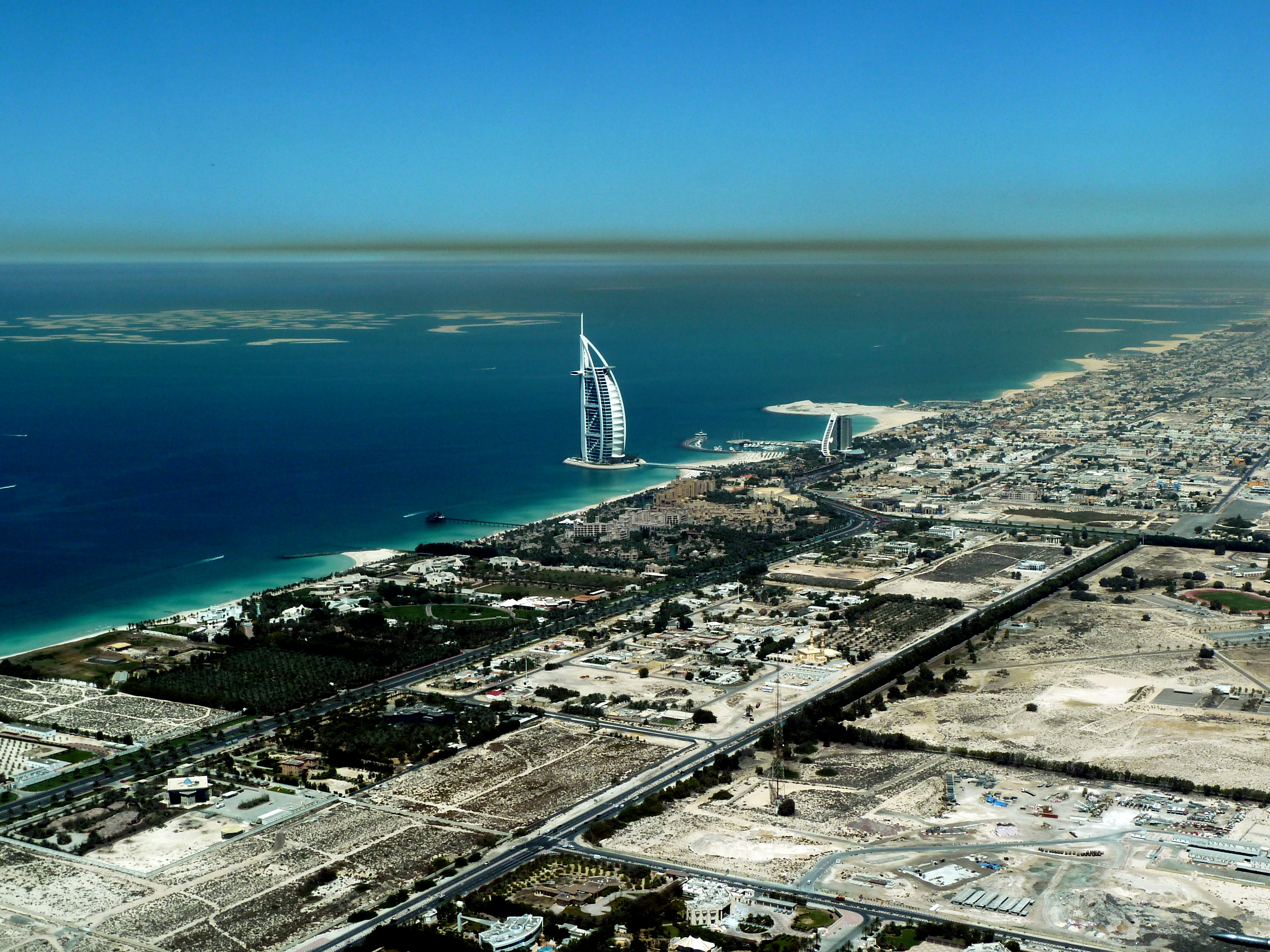
Burj Al Arab

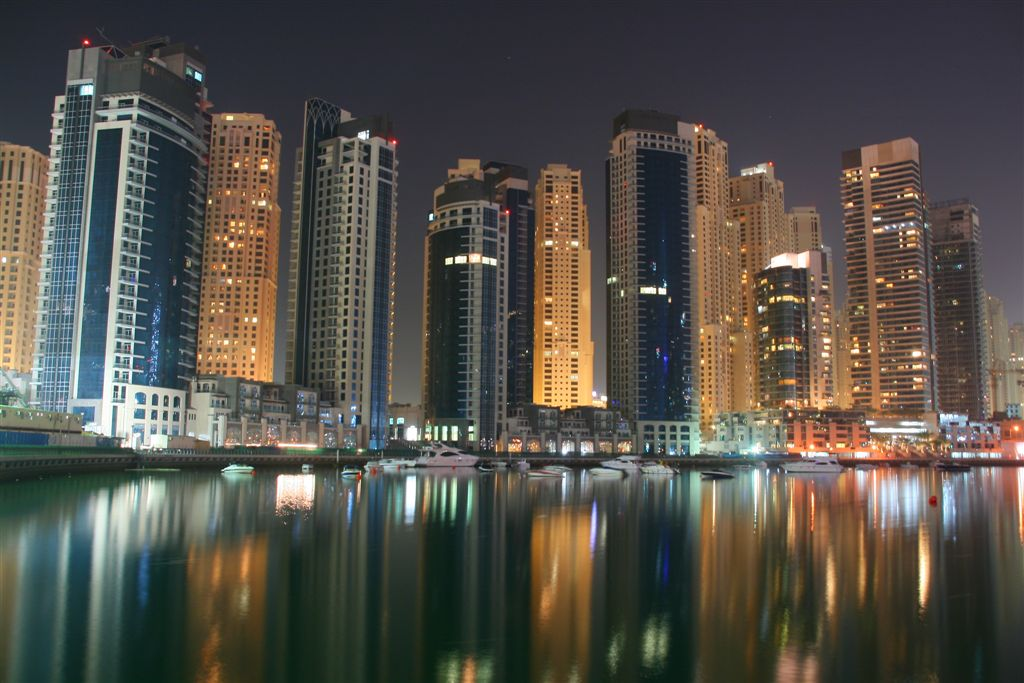
Dubai Marina (2008)

Community Name	Arabic Name	Area (km^{2})	Population (2021)
Jumeira First	جميرا الأولى	10.0	21,496
Al Bada'	البدع	2.0	58,437
Al Satwa	السطوة	2.7	40,997
Trade Centre First	المركز التجاري الأولى	0.8	17,676
Jumeira Bay	جميرا باي	1.0	41
Jumeira Second	جميرا الثانية	3.3	10,660
Al Wasl	الوصل	4.9	12,185
World Islands	جزر العالم	74.1	7
Jumeirah Island 2	جزيرة جميرا 2	0.1	3
Jumeira Third	جميرا الثالثة	3.4	14,188
Al Safa First	الصفا الأولى	2.4	9,043
Umm Suqeim First	أم سقيم الأولى	2.8	12,468
Al Safa Second	الصفا الثانية	1.9	7,062
Umm Suqeim Second	أم سقيم الثانية	3.2	13,236
Al Manara	المنارة	2.2	8,745
Umm Suqeim Third	أم سقيم الثالثة	2.6	7,777
Umm Al Sheif	أم الشيف	1.8	4,618
Al Safouh First	الصفوح الأولى	5.9	4,686
Nakhlat Jumeira	نخلة جميرا	26.7	25,050
Al Safouh Second	الصفوح الثانية	4.3	6,478
Marsa Dubai	مرسى دبي	8.9	62,570

== Zaa'beel ==
This sector develops along the central-western area of Dubai and includes the localities of Zaa'beel, Downtown Dubai, and their immediate hinterland. It therefore includes the financial districts of Dubai International Financial Centre and Business Bay

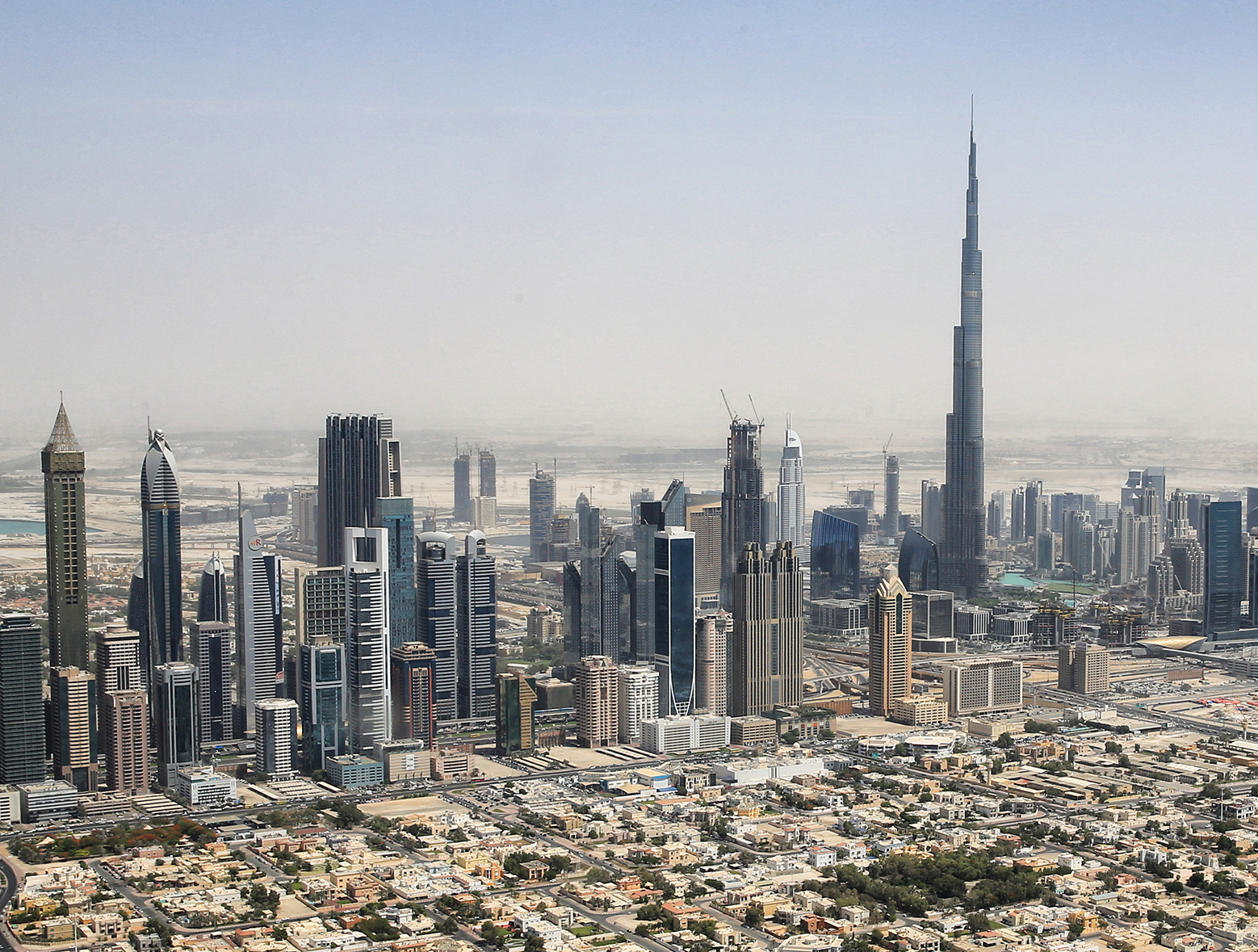
Financial Center (Trade Center 1 & 2) and Downtown Dubai

Community Name	Arabic Name	Area (km^{2})	Population (2021)
Al Kifaf	الكفاف	0.8	602
Zaa'beel First	زعبيل الأولى	4.1	3,449
Trade Center Second	المركز التجاري| الثانية	1.441	13,515
Zaa'beel Second	زعبيل الثانية	10.8	8,568
Downtown Dubai	برج خليفة	2.7	21,862
Business Bay	الخليج التجاري	6.63	23,943

== Madinat Mohammed Bin Rashid ==
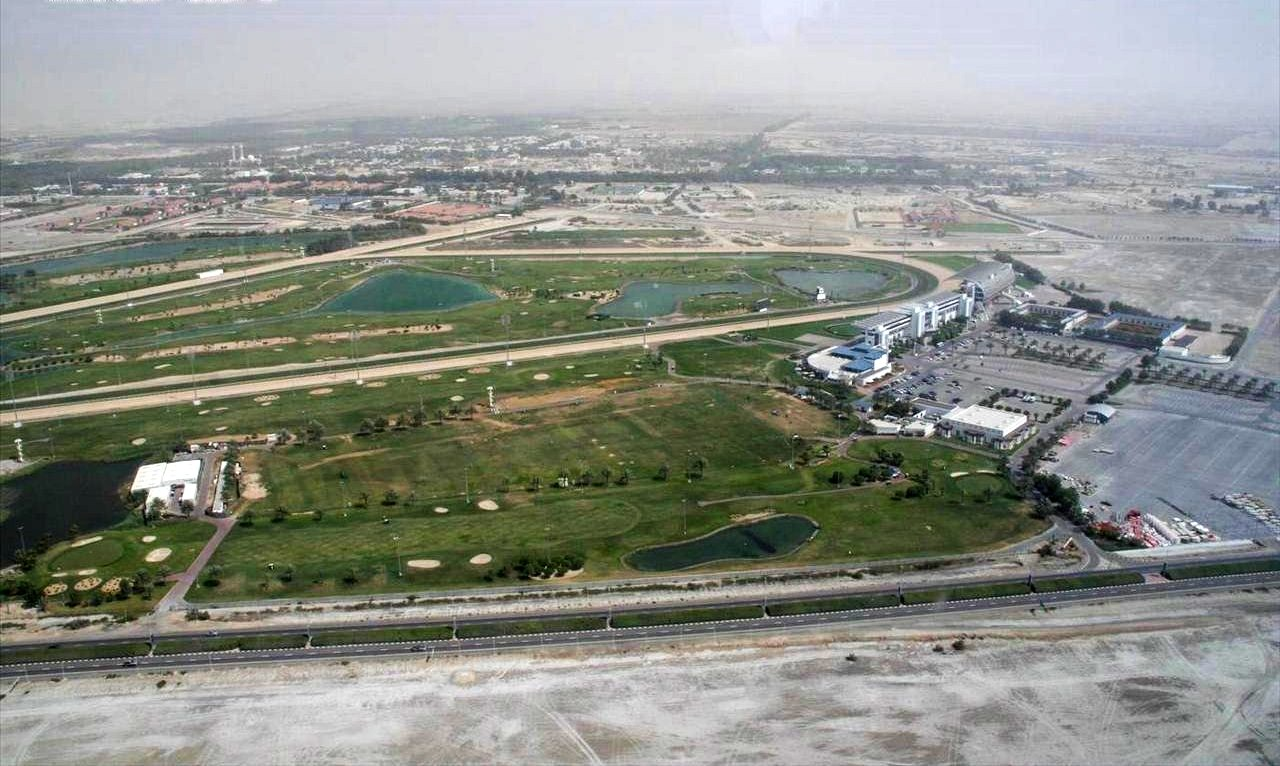
Meydan Racecourse

This sector develops along the south-central area of Dubai and includes the localities of Nadd Al Shiba First, Al Qouz, and their immediate hinterland. It therefore includes the communities of Hadaeq Sheikh Mohammed Bin Rashid, Al Barsha, Al Barsha South, and Al Thanyah.

Al Qouz Ind. Fourth

Mall of the Emirates

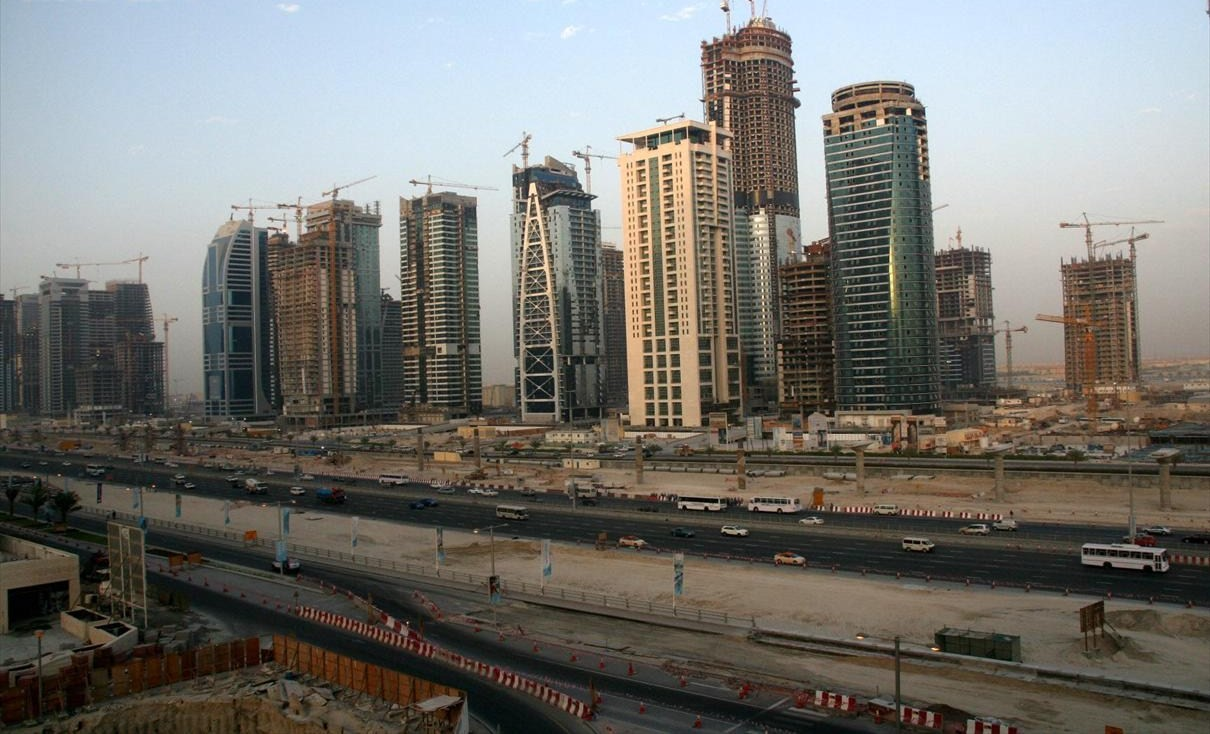
Jumeirah Lakes Towers (2007)

Community Name	Arabic Name	Area (km^{2})	Population (2021)
Al Qouz First	القوز الاولى	3.6	21,322
Al Merkadh	المركاض	10.4	1,817
Nadd Al Shiba First	ند الشبا الأولى	21.7	6,589
Wadi Al Safa 3	وادي الصفا 3	30.2	10,270
Al Qouz Third	القوز الثالثة	2.4	50,190
Al Qouz Fourth	القوز الرابعة	2.2	21,691
Ghadeer Al Tair	غدير الطير	5.3	5,543
Al Qouz Ind. First	القوز الصناعية الأولى	4.8	28,060
Al Qouz Ind. Second	القوز الصناعية الثانية	5.1	128,867
Al Qouz Ind. Third	القوز الصناعية الثالثة	4.4	17,306
Al Qouz Ind. Fourth	القوز الصناعية الرابعة	4.7	38,761
Hadaeq Sheikh Mohammed Bin Rashid	حدائق الشيخ محمد بن راشد	38.7	3,356
Al Barsha First	البرشاء الأولى	4.0	41,532
Al Barsha Second	البرشاء الثانية	6.4	16,417
Al Barsha Third	البرشاء الثالثة	4.9	15,401
Al Barsha South First	البرشاء جنوب الاولى	5.9	14,500
Al Barsha South Second	البرشاء جنوب الثانية	4.8	7,239
Al Barsha South Third	البرشاء جنوب الثالثة	3.7	8,573
Al Thanyah First	الثنيه الأولى	1.1	25,778
Al Thanyah Third	الثنيه الثالثة	3.8	22,394
Al Thanyah Second	الثنيه الثانية	6.2	0
Al Barsha South Fourth	البرشاء جنوب الرابعة	6.8	29,087
Al Thanyah Fifth	الثنيه الخامسة	9.7	40,957
Al Thanyah Fourth	الثنيه الرابعة	11.1	28,424
Al Barsha South Fifth	البرشاء جنوب الخامسة	3.0	7,809

== Wadi Al Safa ==
Liwan (Wadi Al Safa 2)

This sector is located in the central area of the Emirate of Dubai. It is bordered, in broad terms, by Emirates Road (E 611) to the east, by Expo Road (E 77) to the south, by Sheikh Mohammed Bin Zayed Road (E 311) to the west and from Dubai-Al Ain Road (E 66) to the north. It includes, among other things: the vast industrial area of Dubai Investment Park, the residential areas of Wadi Al Safa and Al Hebiah, with the Me'aisem area containing the residential complex of Jumeirah Golf Estates. The largest community in the sector is Dubai Investment Park Second, which contains DAMAC Riverside and Grand Polo Club.

Dubai Motor City in Al Hebiah First.

Community Name	Arabic Name	Area (km^{2})	Population (2021)
Wadi Al Safa 2	وادي الصفا 2	10.5	10,890
Wadi Al Safa 4	وادي الصفا 4	6.9	167
Wadi Al Safa 5	وادي الصفا 5	16.3	20,479
Wadi Al Safa 6	وادي الصفا 6	7.8	18,856
Wadi Al Safa 7	وادي الصفا 7	8.4	8,957
Al Hebiah First	الحبيه الاول	4.2	11,155
Al Hebiah Second	الحبيه الثانية	3.3	781
Al Hebiah Third	الحبيه الثالثة	4.3	7,238
Al Hebiah Sixth	الحبيه السادسة	3.3	2,455
Al Hebiah Fourth	الحبيه الرابعة	9.1	21,609
Al Hebiah Fifth	الحبيه الخامسة	8.1	10,302
Me'aisem First	معيصم الأول	16.4	18,484
Me'aisem Second	معيصم الثانية	10.4	13
Dubai Investment Park First	مجمع دبي للاستثمار الأول	17.2	63,094
Dubai Investment Park Second	مجمع دبي للاستثمار الثاني	18.8	80,118

== Madinat Hind ==
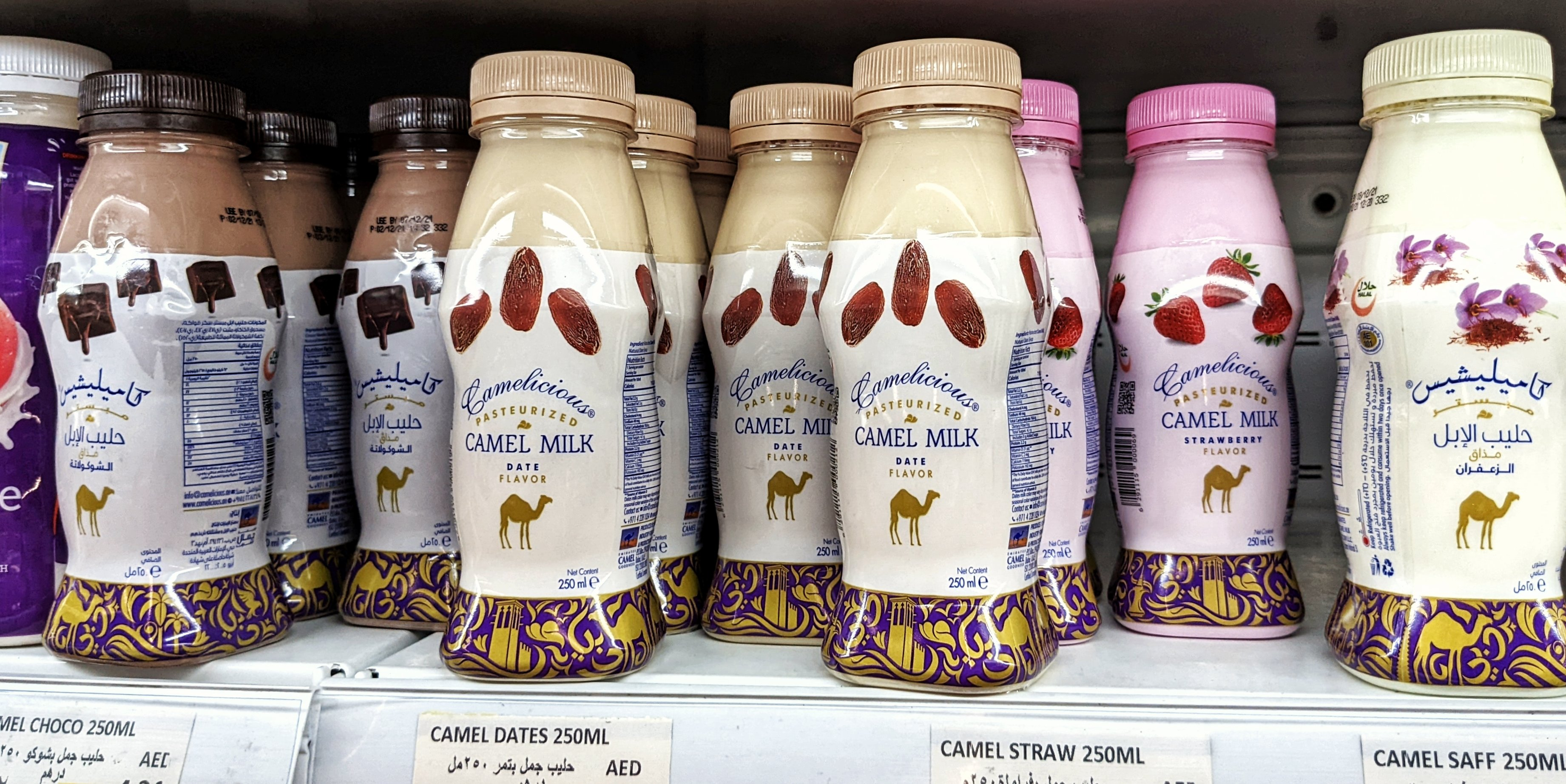
Camel Milk from Camelicious produced in Madinat Hind

This sector is located in the central-eastern area of the Emirate of Dubai. It is bordered to the east and south by Jabal Ali-Lehbab Road (E 77), west by Emirates Road (E 611), and north by Dubai-Al Ain Road (E 66). The territory is part of the Dubai Peri-Urban Area consisting largely of desert.

Sunset on the E77 road

Community Name	Arabic Name	Area (km^{2})	Population (2021)
Madinat Hind 1	مدينة هند 1	14.1	8
Madinat Hind 3	مدينة هند 3	15.3	3,623
Al Yufrah 1	اليفره 1	17.5	403
Madinat Hind 2	مدينة هند 2	8.5	2
Madinat Hind 4	مدينة هند 4	60.4	3,136
Al Yufrah 2	اليفره 2	11.8	3
Al Yalayis 1	الياليس 1	17.8	1,679
Al Yalayis 3	الياليس 3	12.3	4
Al Yalayis 2	الياليس 2	14.3	3,685
Al Yalayis 5	الياليس 5	25.2	88
Al Yalayis 4	الياليس 4	13.2	8

== Saih Al Salam ==
This sector is located in the southeastern area of the Emirate of Dubai of which it occupies a large part. It is bordered to the south by the Emirate of Abu Dhabi. The territory is part of the Dubai Non-Urban Area consisting largely of desert territories, aquifer areas, gas extraction areas, conservation areas and agricultural settlements. Within it is the Al Marmoom Desert Conservation Reserve, which is the largest reserve in the Emirates, with its famous Qudra Lakes. The Sector is the largest of Dubai's sectors with a surface area of approximately 1,664 km^{2}, but the least densely populated, with fewer than 18,000 residents (density of approximately 10.8 inhabitants/km^{2}).

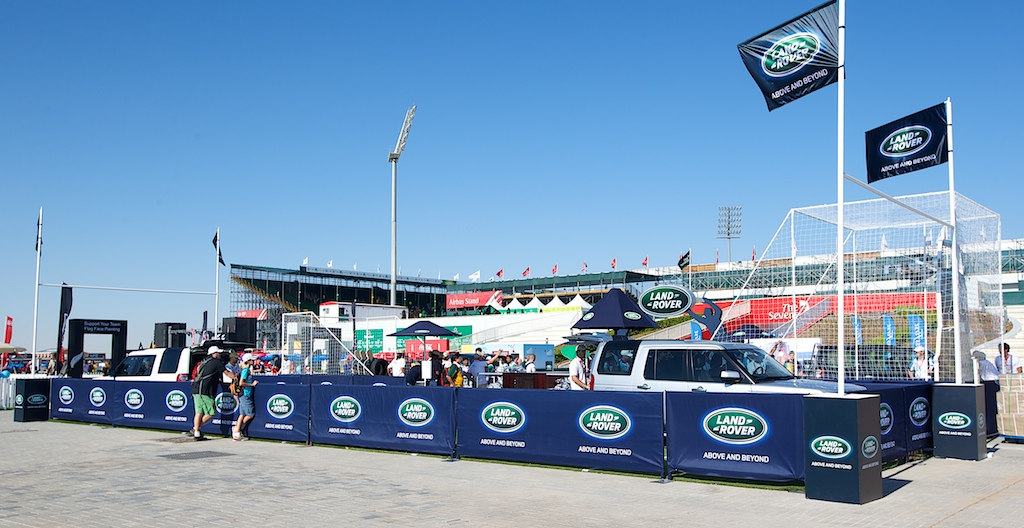
The Sevens Stadium in Al Marmoom

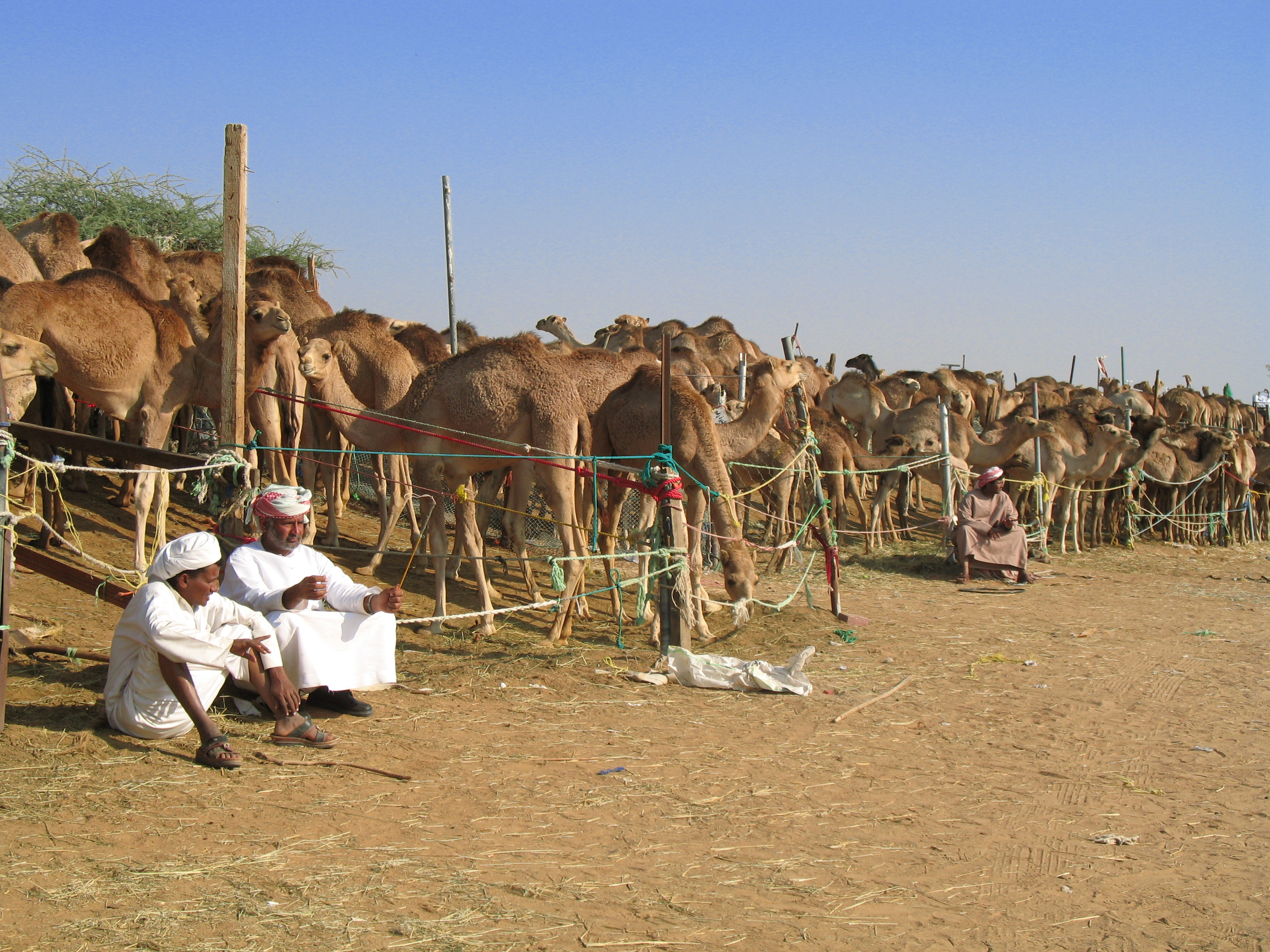
Dubai camel market in Al Lesaily

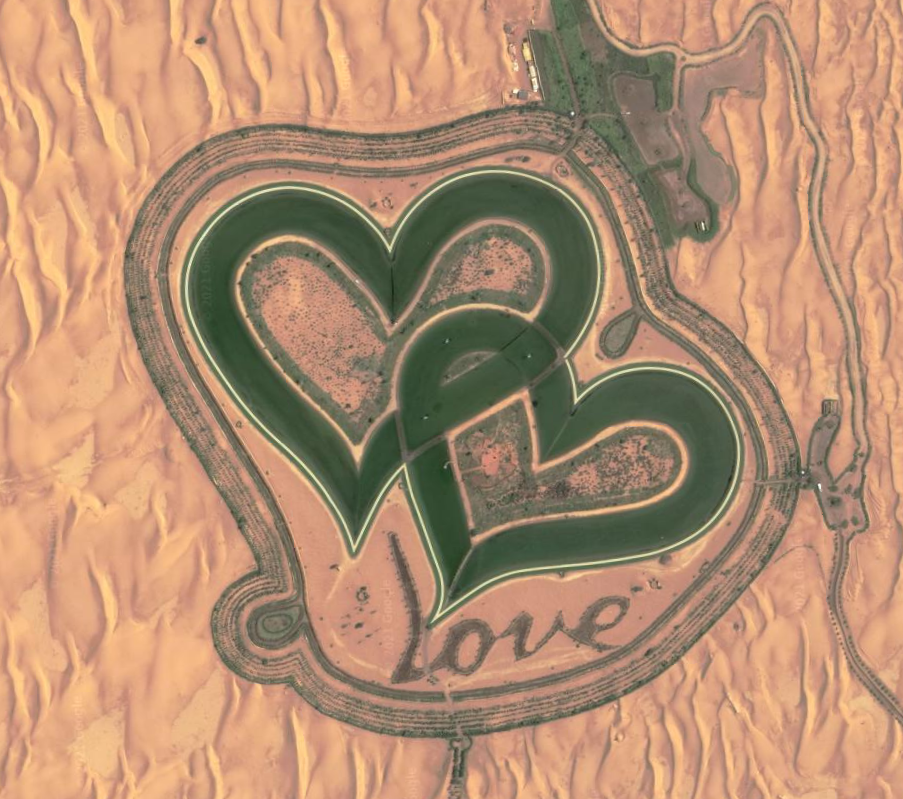
Love Lake in Saih Al Salam seen from the ISS

Community Name	Arabic Name	Area (km^{2})	Population (2021)
Al Marmoom	المرموم	27.3	141
Al Lesaily	الليسيلي	112.7	2,950
Saih Al Salam	سيح السلم	88.7	615
Madinat Latifa	مدينة لطيفة	170.7	684
Ghadeer Barashy	غدير براشي	70.9	33
Mugatrah	مقطره	139.9	347
Al Layan 1	الليان 1	28.3	0
Al Layan 2	الليان 2	37.0	0

== Al Fagaa ==
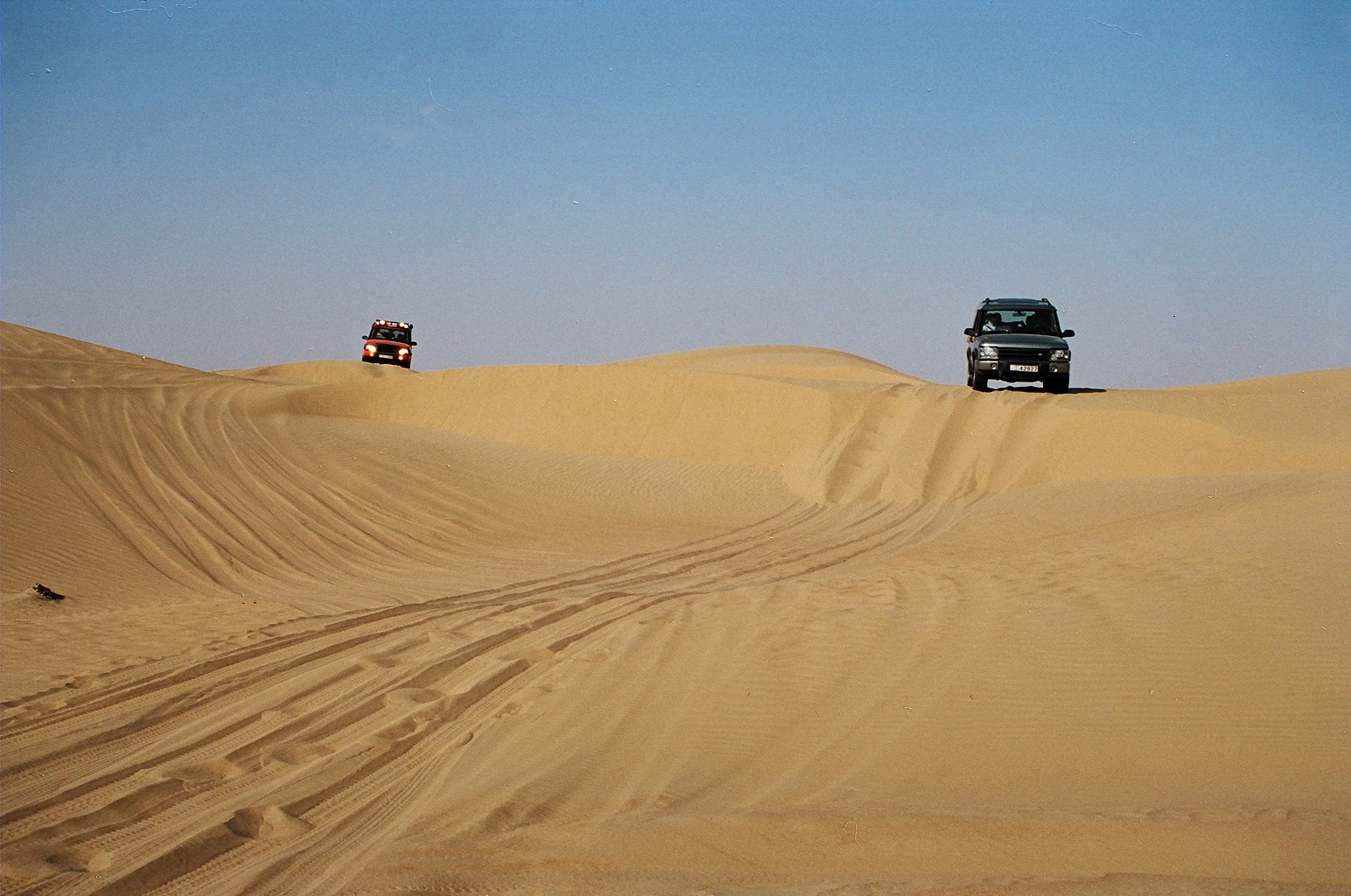
Desert of Dubai in Al Fagaa

This sector is located in the southeast area of the Emirate of Dubai of which it occupies a large part. It is bordered to the south and east by the Emirate of Abu Dhabi. The territory is part of the Dubai Non-Urban Area consisting largely of desert territories, aquifer areas, gas extraction areas, conservation areas and agricultural settlements. Within it is the Al Marmoom Desert Conservation Reserve, which is the largest reserve in the Emirates.

Camel in the desert in Grayteesah

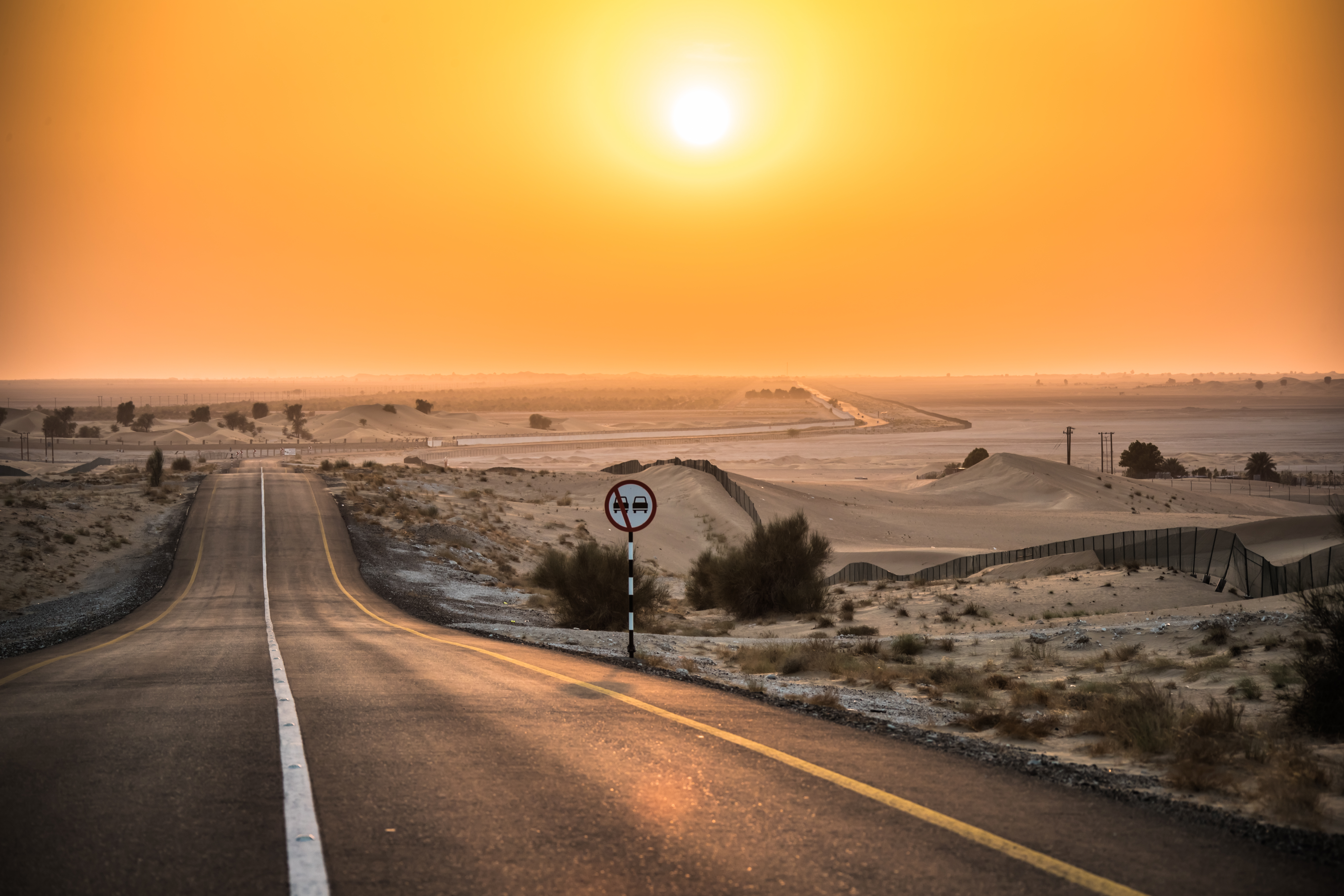
Sunset on the E14 road bordering Abu Dhabi at Al Faqa

Community Name	Arabic Name	Area (km^{2})	Population (2021)
Grayteesah	قريطيسه	91.8	58
Al Fagaa	الفقع	140.5	442
Al Hathmah	الحثمة	82.3	37
Saih Al Dahal	سيح الدحل	190.2	3
Saih Shua'alah	سيح شعيله	69.5	3
Al O'shoosh	العشوش	58.9	3
Hefair	حفير	143.6	0

== Mena Jabal Ali ==
This sector develops along the south-central coastal area of Dubai, from Marsa Dubai in the north, to Hessyan in the south. It includes Jebel Ali Port and DEWA substations.

Mena Jabal Ali from Space (May 2019).

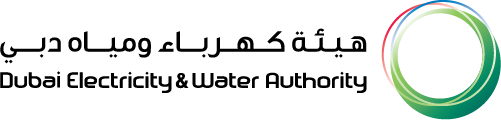
DEWA Logo.

Community Name	Arabic Name	Area (km^{2})	Population (2021)
Jabal Ali Second	جبل علي الثانية	5.1	1,008
Jebel Ali Third	جبل علي الثالثة	365.0	218
Mena Jabal Ali	ميناء جبل علي	34.8	9,467

== Hessyan ==
This sector develops along the southern coastal area of Dubai, from Mena Jabal Ali in the north, to the border with the Emirate of Abu Dhabi in the south. It includes the vast area of Hessyan with its electricity substation, the artificial island of Palm Jebel Ali and the building Al Wajeha Al Bahriah (Dubai Waterfront).

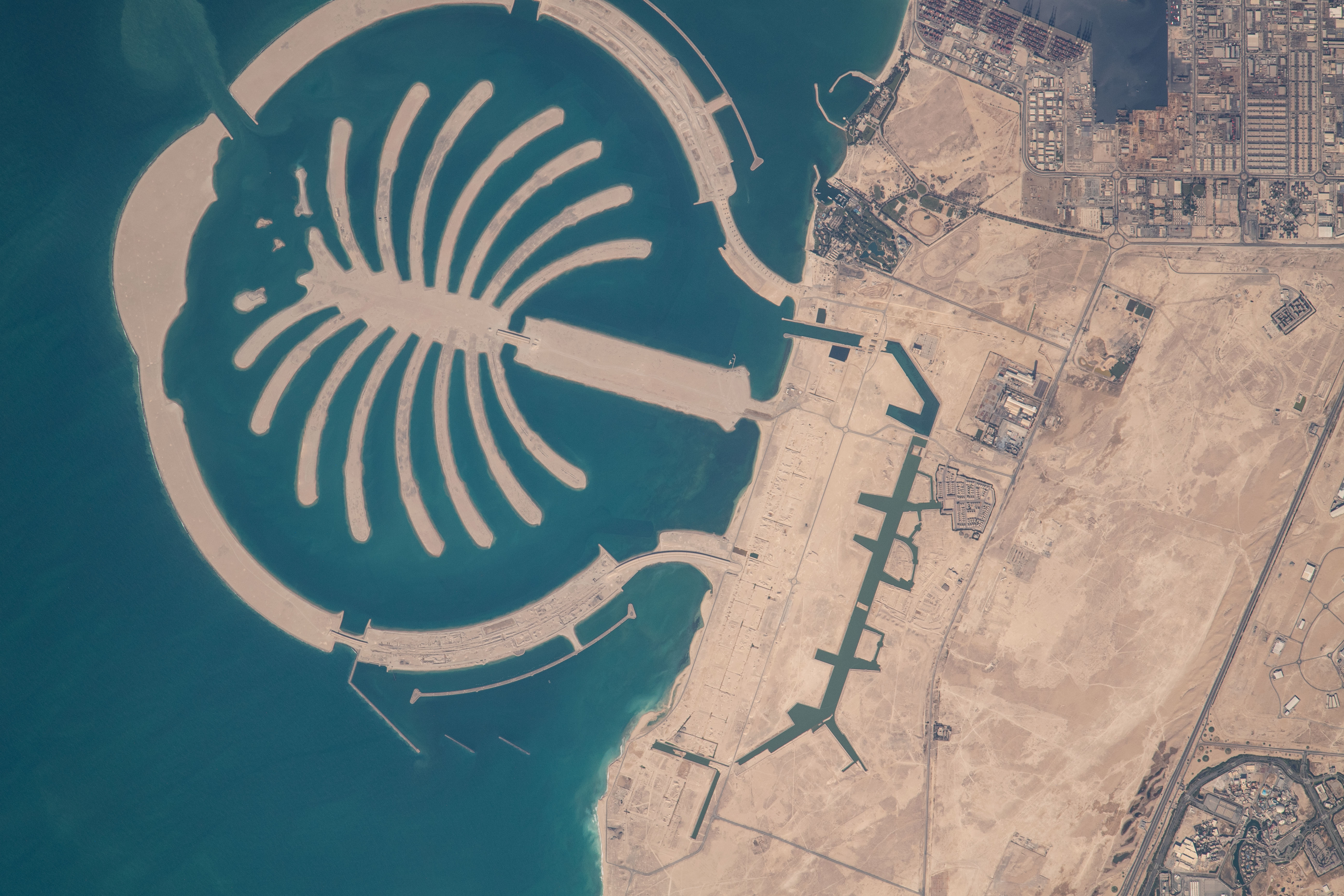
Nakhlat Jabal Ali from Space (October 2021).

Building under construction in Hessyan

Community Name	Arabic Name	Area (km^{2})	Population (2021)
Nakhlat Jabal Ali	نخلة جبل علي	58.1	5
Hessyan First	حصيان الاولى	23.8	3,341
Al Wajeha Al Bahriah	الواجهة البحرية	124.7	4
Hessyan Second	حصيان الثانية	51.9	10,381

== Jabal Ali ==
This sector develops along the southern area of Dubai, from Al Thanyah Fifth and Al Barsha South Fifth in the north, to the border with the Emirate of Abu Dhabi in the south. It includes the vast area of Jebel Ali with its industrial zone.

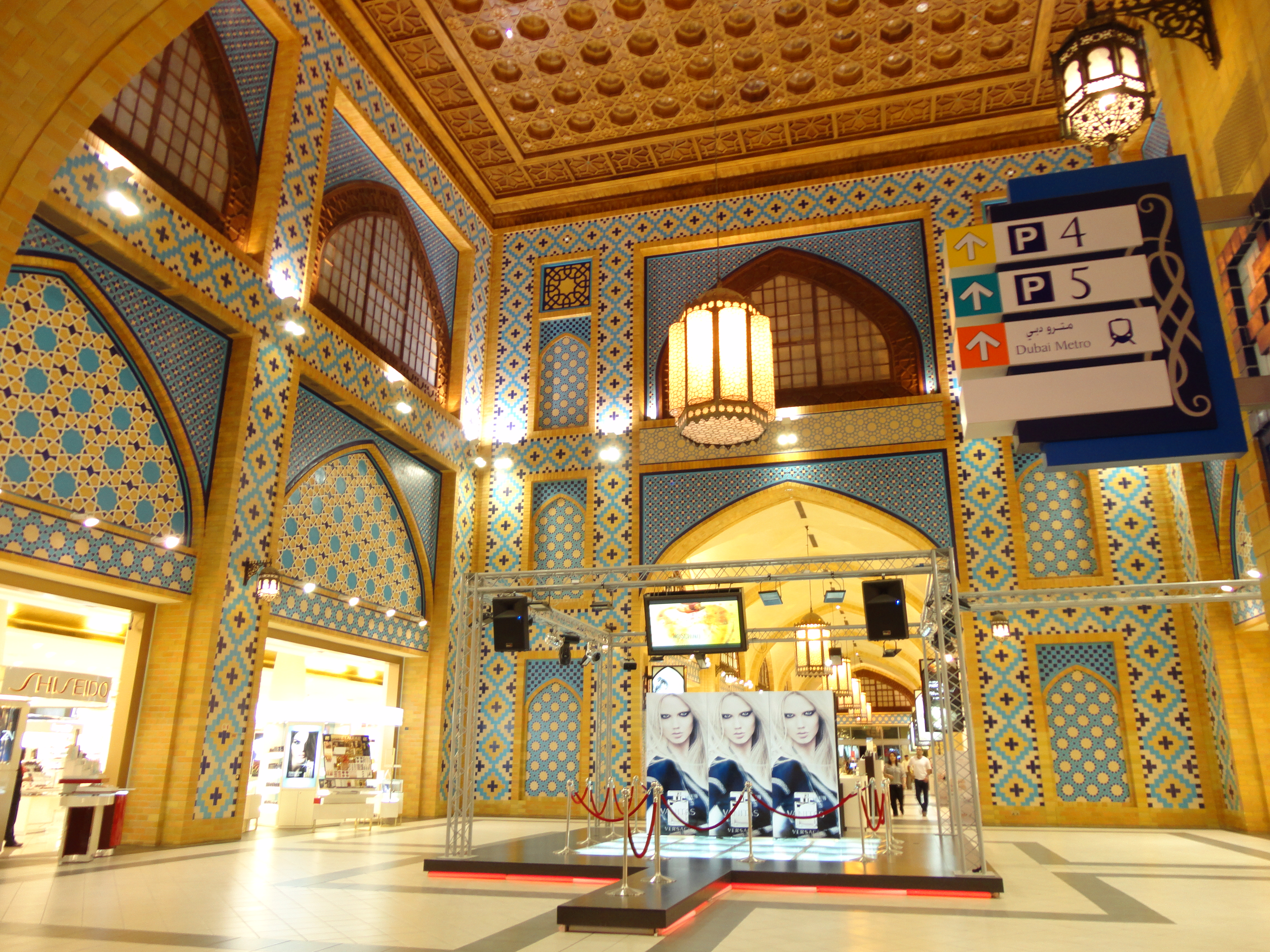
Ibn Battuta Mall.

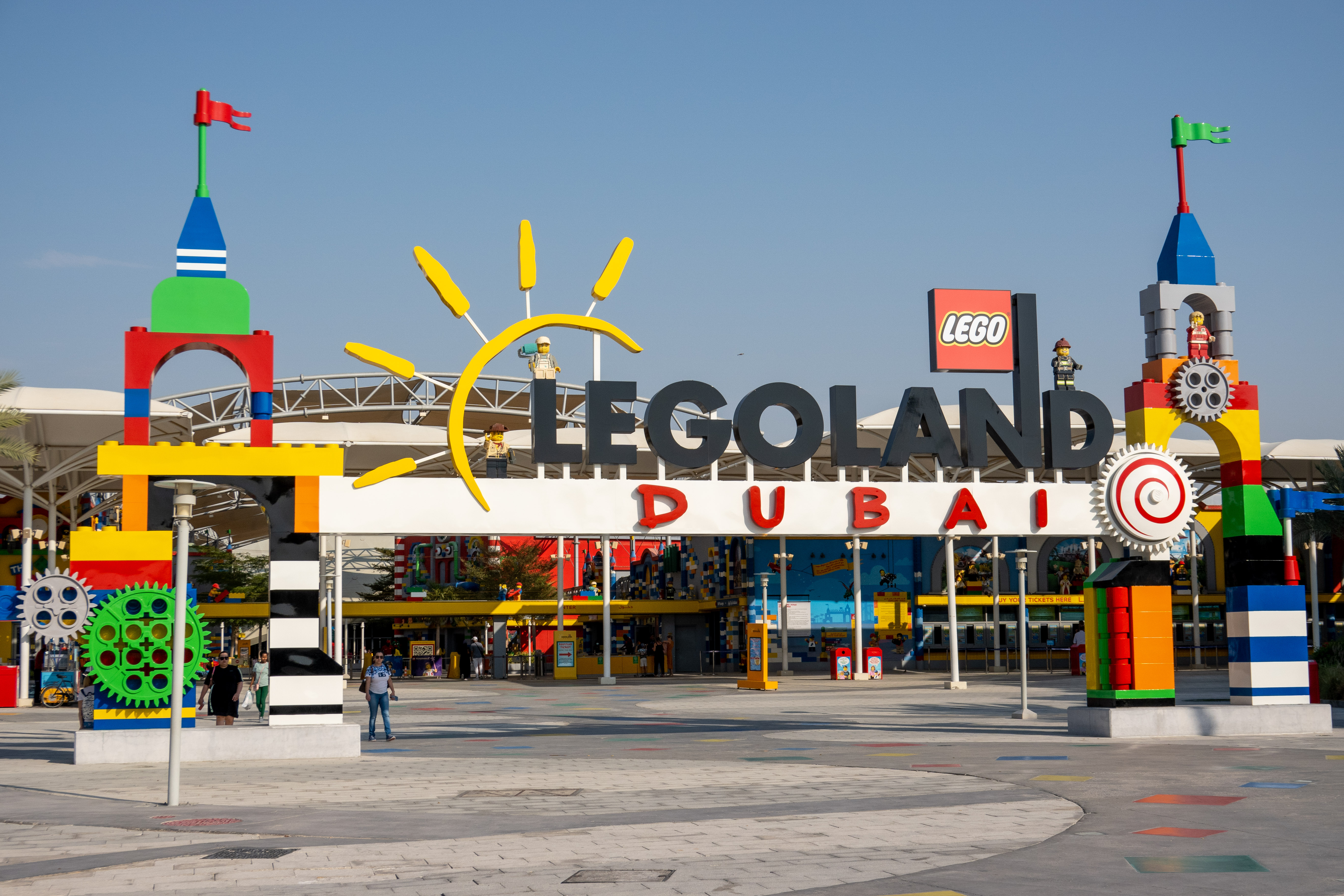
Entrance of Legoland Dubai.

Community Name	Arabic Name	Area (km^{2})	Population (2021)
Jabal Ali First	جبل علي الأولى	21.3	77,363
Jabal Ali Ind. First	جبل علي الصناعية الأولى	22.1	198,228
Jabal Ali Ind. Second	جبل علي الصناعية الثانية	32.6	28,000
Jabal Ali Ind. Third	جبل علي الصناعية الثالثة	30.0	0
Saih Shuaib 1	سيح شعيب 1	41.6	16

== Madinat Al Maktoum ==
This sector also develops along the southern area of Dubai, from Dubai Investment Park in the north, to the border with the Emirate of Abu Dhabi in the south. It includes the vast area of Dubai South with Expo 2020 and Al Maktoum International Airport, as well as the industrial area of Dubai Industrial City.

Al Wasl Plaza of EXPO 2020.

Community Name	Arabic Name	Area (km^{2})	Population (2021)
Madinat Al Mataar	مدينة المطار	141.8	4,150
Saih Shuaib 2	سيح شعيب 2	22.3	12,629
Saih Shuaib 3	سيح شعيب 3	16.0	4,684
Saih Shuaib 4	سيح شعيب 4	19.4	10,766

== Hatta ==
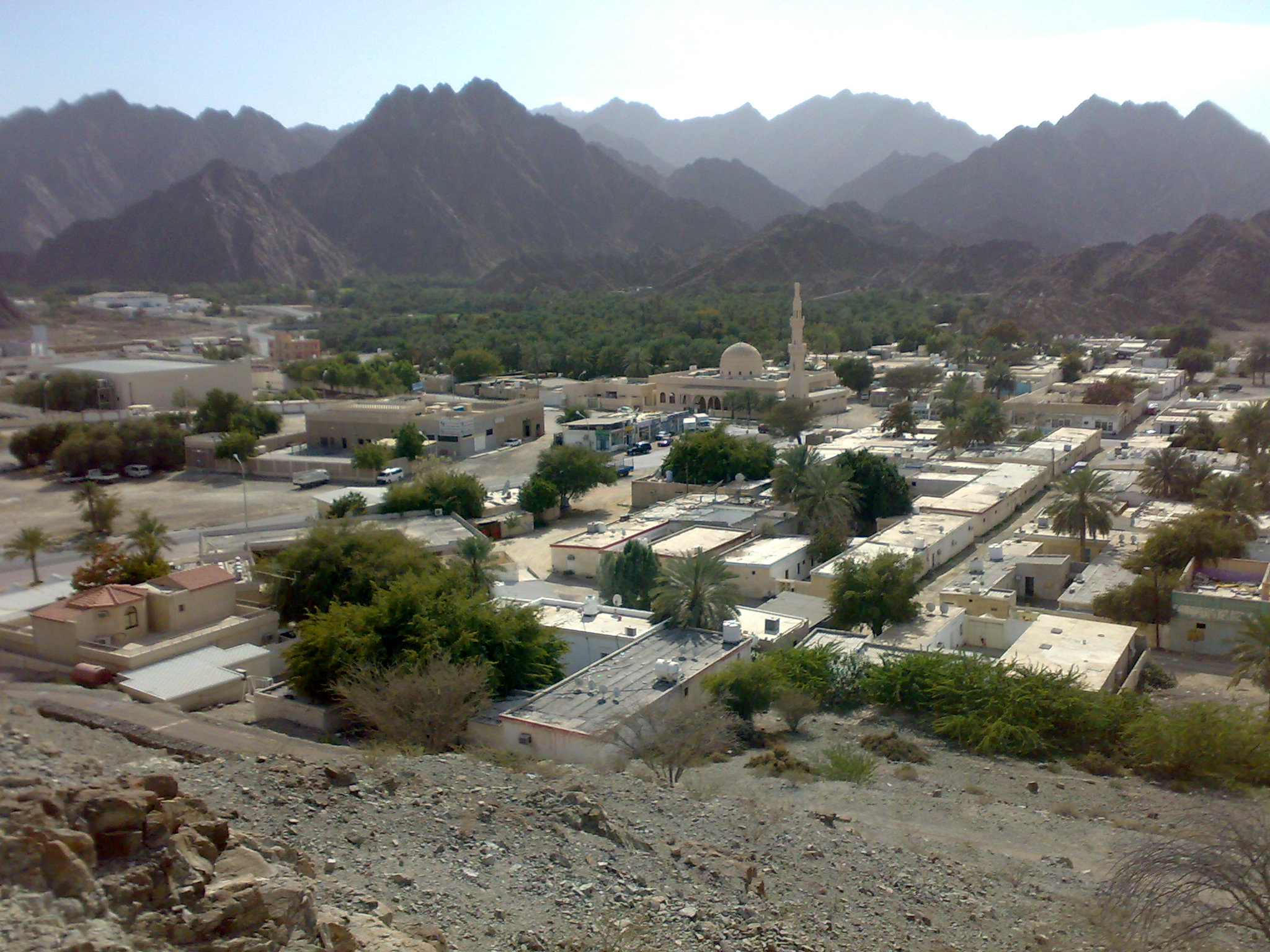
The town of Hatta.

This sector is an exclave of the Emirate of Dubai and borders to the east and south with the Oman, the west with Masfout, an exclave of the Emirate of Ajman, and the north with the Emirate of Ras Al Khaimah. This sector is located in the Hajar Mountains. The land is part of the Dubai Non-Urban Area

Community Name	Arabic Name	Area (km^{2})	Population (2021)
Hatta	حتا	128.8	14,985
