= Margab (Dubai) =

Margab مرقب
- Community
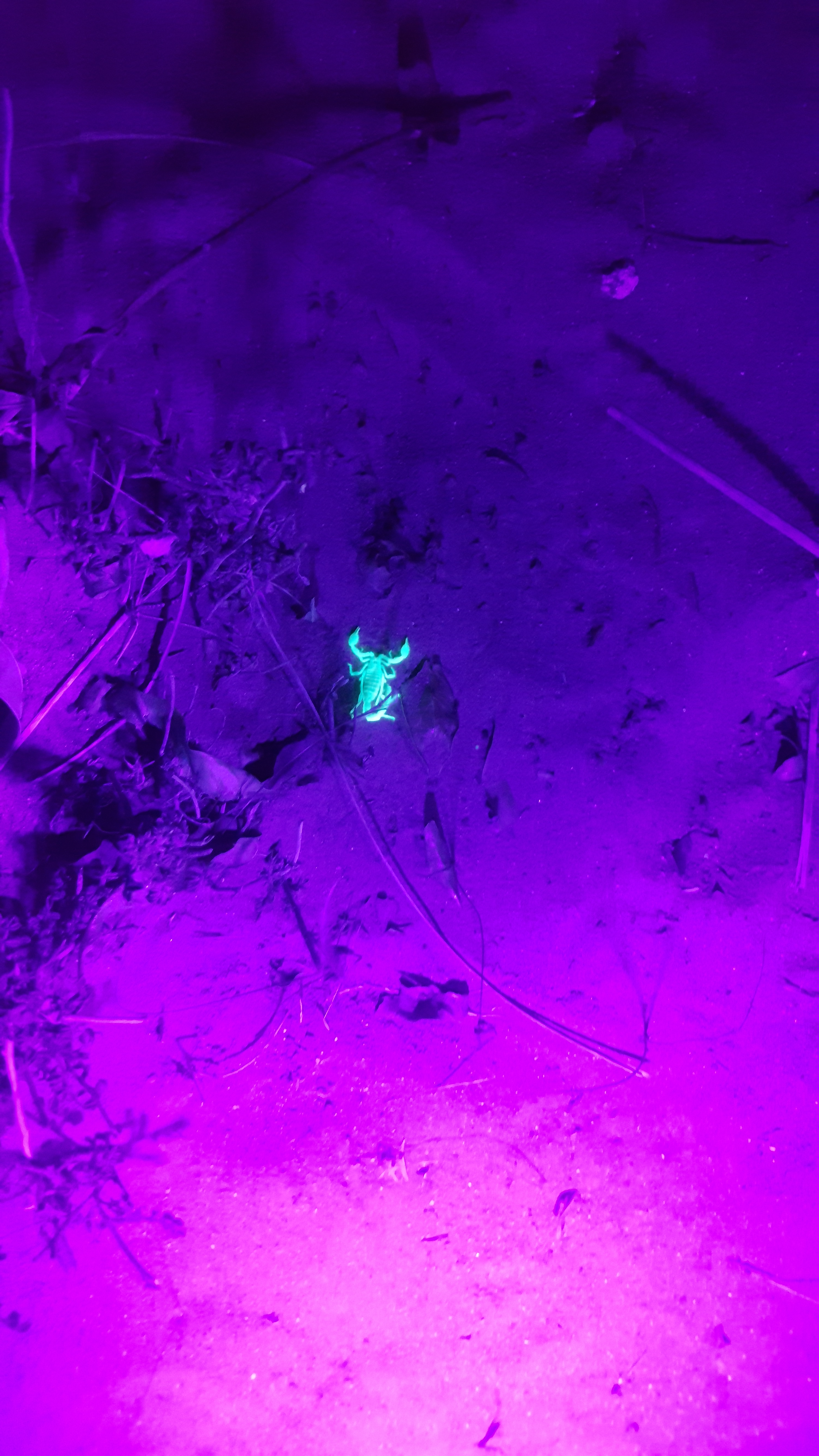
- A scorpion in desert at night in Margab
- Interactive map of Margab
- Coordinates: 24.822592°N 55.604058°E
- Country: United Arab Emirates
- Emirate: Dubai
- City: Dubai

Area
  - Total: 34.6 km^{2} (13.4 sq mi)

Population
  - Total: 666
  - Density: 19.2/km^{2} (49.9/sq mi)
- Community number: 857

Margab (Arabic: مرقب) is a community of the Emirate of Dubai, in the United Arab Emirates. It is located in Sector 8 in eastern Dubai.

== Territory ==
The territory of the community occupies an area of 34.6 km^{2} which develops in a non-urban area in eastern Dubai, on the border with the Emirate of Sharjah.

The area is bounded on the east by Remah, on the south by Yaraah, on the west by the community of Al Fagaa and north by Umm Eselay.

The territory is largely desert and falls almost entirely within the Dubai Desert Conservation Reserve, one of the oldest and largest protected areas in Dubai.

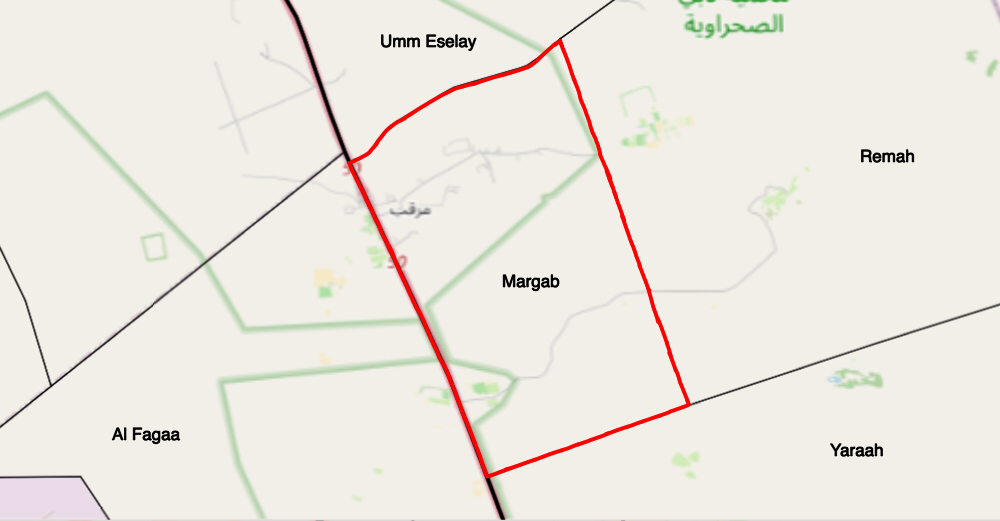
Margab map

The area is not currently served by the Dubai Metro.

== See also ==
- List of communities in Dubai
- History of the UAE

== Bibliography ==
- Dubai: The Complete Residents' Guide. Explorer Publishing & Distribution, 2006. June 2006. ISBN 9789768182760.
- Frauke Heard-Bey (1982). From Trucial States to United Arab Emirates: a society in transition. ISBN 0582780322.
