= Al Markada =

Al Markada المركاض
- Community
- Interactive map of Al Markada
- Coordinates: 25.168591°N 55.29213°E
- Country: United Arab Emirates
- Emirate: Dubai
- City: Dubai

Area
  - Total: 11.7 km^{2} (4.5 sq mi)

Population (2000)
  - Total: 139
  - Density: 11.9/km^{2} (30.8/sq mi)
- Community number: 347

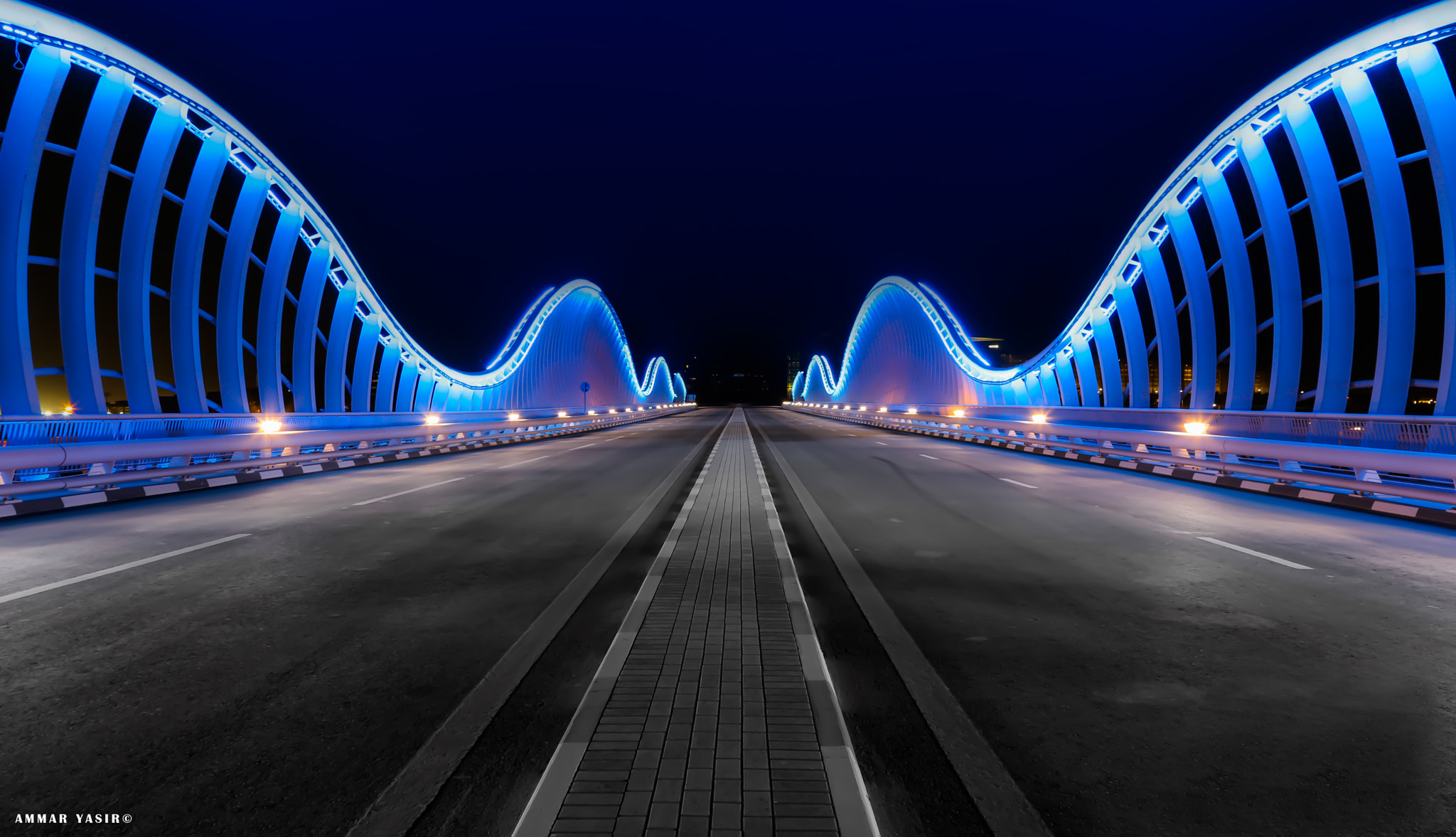
Blue Bridge

Al Markada (Arabic: المركاض), also spelled Al Marked or Al Markad or Al Merkad, is a locality in Dubai, United Arab Emirates (UAE). Located in western Dubai in Bur Dubai, Al Markada is bordered to the north by Zabeel and Business Bay, to the south by Nad Al Sheba and Al Quoz and to the east by Bu Kadra. It is bounded to the north by route E 44 (Al Khail Road) and to the south by route D 69 (Muscat Road).

Al Markada is primarily known for its camel race course and is not a residential community. The Nad Al Sheba Racecourse is located about 2.7 km southwest of Al Markada.

Pastor Obiang, the son of Equatorial Guinea’s authoritarian leader Teodoro Obiang Nguema, owns a property in Al Merkadh. Mohammad Emami and Amir Reza Farzanrad, two Iranians implicated in financial corruption, own villas in Al Markada worth $5.5 million and $12 million, respectively.
