= Al Hudaiba =

Al Hudaiba الحضيبة
- Community
- Location within Dubai
- Coordinates: 25.24004°N 55.27831°E
- Country: United Arab Emirates
- Emirate: Dubai
- City: Dubai

Area
  - Total: 0.84 km^{2} (0.32 sq mi)

Population (2000)
  - Total: 7,699
  - Density: 9,200/km^{2} (24,000/sq mi)
- Community number: 322

Al Hudaiba (Arabic: الحضيبة) is a locality in Dubai, United Arab Emirates (UAE). A small community, Al Hudaiba is located near Port Rashid.

Important landmarks in Al Hudaiba include Chelsea Hotel and the consulate of Sri Lanka. The locality is bordered by Al Mina, Port Rashid, Al Jafiliya, and Al Bada.
