= Trade Centre 1 =

Trade Centre 1 المركز التجاري الأولى
- Community
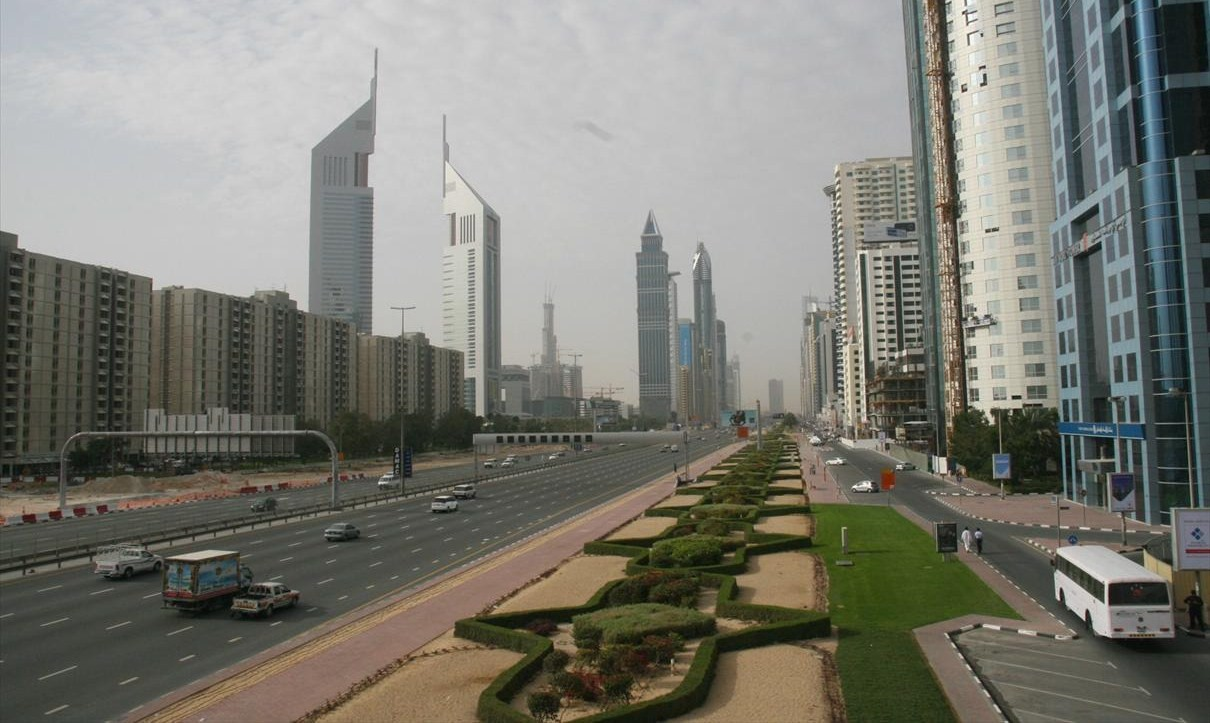
- Trade Centre 1 (right) is a residential and commercial district on Sheikh Zayed Road.
- Interactive map of Trade Centre 1
- Coordinates: 25.22505°N 55.28312°E
- Country: United Arab Emirates
- Emirate: Dubai
- City: Dubai

Area
  - Total: 0.90 km^{2} (0.35 sq mi)

Population (2000)
  - Total: 4,358
  - Density: 4,800/km^{2} (13,000/sq mi)
- Community number: 335

Trade Centre 1 (Arabic: االمركز التجاري الأول), a.k.a. Trade Centre First, is a locality in Dubai, United Arab Emirates. Located in western Dubai, Trade Centre 1 forms the northern half of the commercial and residential district on Sheikh Zayed Road. The locality begins at Trade Centre Roundabout, at the intersection of Sheikh Zayed Road and route D 73 (Al Dhiyafa Road), and terminates at the 2nd Interchange (Defence Roundabout).

Trade Centre 1 is made up almost entirely of high rises along Sheikh Zayed Road; a local road system similar to other localities in Dubai does not exist. However, a local road (15th Street) links Trade Centre 1 to Trade Centre 2.

Trade Centre 1 is bordered to the north by Al Satwa, to the south by Trade Centre 2, to the west by Al Wasl and to the east by Al Jafilia. Important landmarks in Trade Centre 1 include The Fairmont Dubai, The Monarch Office Tower, Saeed Tower 2, Four Points by Sheraton and Shangri-La Hotel.
