= Wadi Alamardi =

Wadi Alamardi وادي العمردي
- Community
- Interactive map of Wadi Alamardi
- Coordinates: 25.206348°N 55.485221°E
- Country: United Arab Emirates
- Emirate: Dubai
- City: Dubai

Area
  - Total: 24.2 km^{2} (9.3 sq mi)

Population
  - Total: 3,565
  - Density: 147/km^{2} (382/sq mi)
- Community number: 271

Wadi Alamardi (Arabic:وادي العمردي), or also Al Amardhi, is a community of the Emirate of Dubai, in the United Arab Emirates. It is located in the Sector 2 in Northern Dubai.

== Territory ==
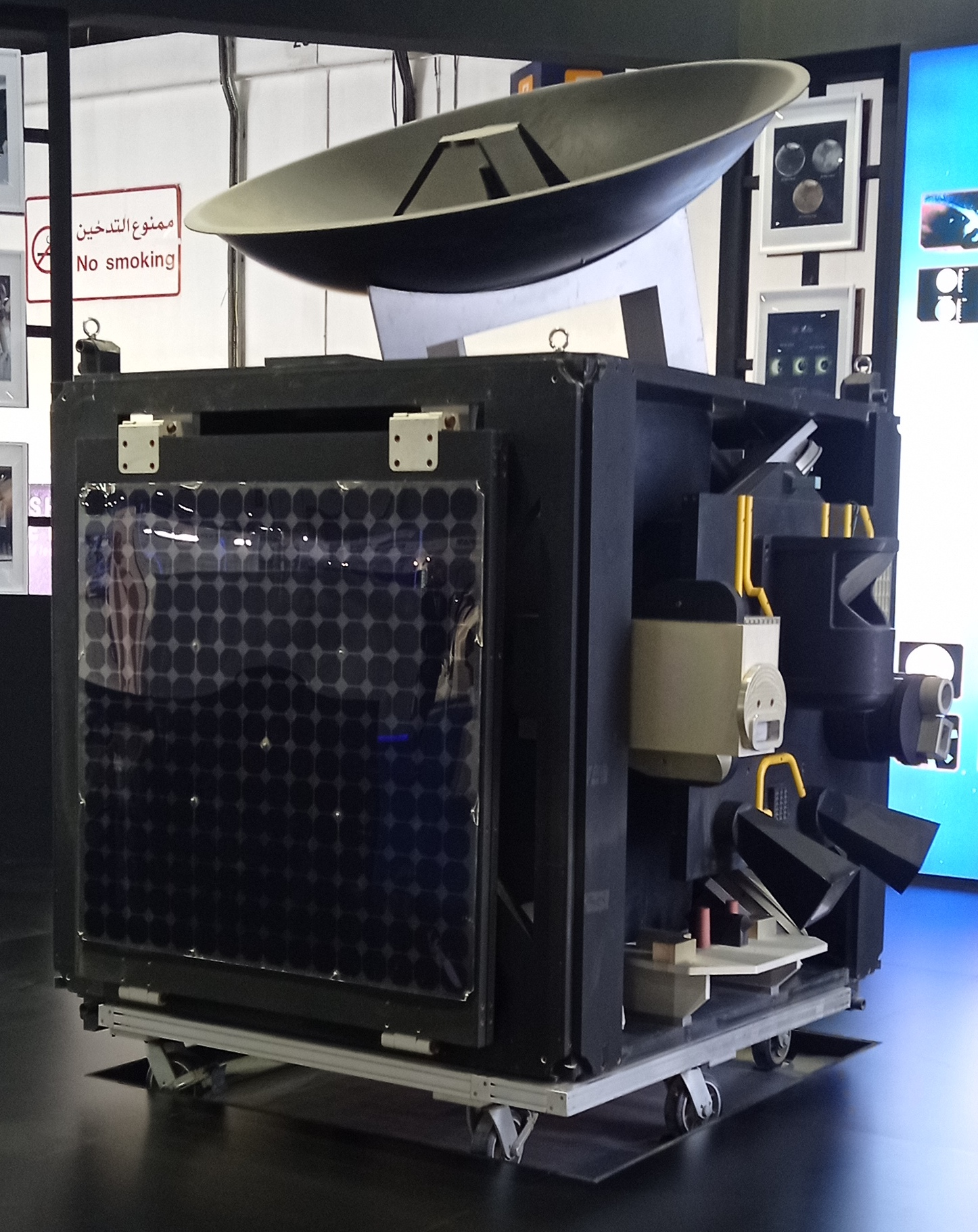
Model of the Mars Hope space probe made by the MBRSC.

The territory occupies an area of 24.2 km^{2} in northern Dubai, eastern urban area.

The area is bounded to the north by Al Khawaneej Road (D 89), to the east by Al Amardi Street (D 50) and Emirates Road (E 611), to the south by Tripoli Street (D 83) and to the west from Sheikh Zayed Bin Hamdan Al Nahyan Street (D 54).

It is a residential neighborhood with residential apartments and private villas spread over large spaces. The neighborhood's population density is very low, equal to about 147 inhabitants/km^{2}. In the neighborhood there are many equestrian clubs and riding centers with attached stables for keeping horses.

The district is home to the Mohammed bin Rashid Space Centre (MBRSC) and the Emirates Institution for Advanced Science and Technology (EIAST), which work on the implementation of the Emirates space program which also includes the Emirates Mars Mission.

There is no Metro stop in the neighborhood and the nearest stop is Centrepoint in the Al Rashidiya neighborhood which is about 12 km away The public surface lines run along the outer streets, Al Khawaneej Road and Al Amardi Street and do not enter the neighborhood. This makes the area not easily accessible by public transport.

== Bibliography ==
- Dubai: The Complete Residents' Guide. Explorer Publishing & Distribution. 2006. p. 258. ISBN 9789768182760.
