= Al Kefaf =

Al Kefaf الكفاف
- Community
- Interactive map of Al Kefaf
- Coordinates: 25.235321°N 55.296507°E
- Country: United Arab Emirates
- Emirate: Dubai
- City: Dubai

Area
  - Total: 0.8 km^{2} (0.31 sq mi)

Population (2000)
  - Total: 35
  - Density: 44/km^{2} (110/sq mi)
- Community number: 324

Al Kefaf (Arabic: الكفاف) is a locality in Dubai, United Arab Emirates (UAE). Al Kefaf is located in western Dubai in Bur Dubai and is bordered to the north by Al Jafilia and Al Karama, to the south by Zabeel and to the east by Oud Metha.

Sheikh Zayed Road's Trade Centre Roundabout forms the southwestern border of Al Kefaf, while the Al Karama Interchange forms the southeastern border. Zabeel Park covers much of Al Kefaf, while several prominent buildings are located along route D 88 (Trade Centre Road), which forms Al Kefaf's western periphery. Etisalat Tower 2, one of Etisalat's many offices in Dubai, is located in Al Kefaf.
