= Al Yalayis =

Dubai community

Al Yalayis الياليس
- Community
- Interactive map of Al Yalayis
- Coordinates: 25.017727°N 55.285913°E
- Country: United Arab Emirates
- Emirate: Dubai
- City: Dubai

Area
  - Total: 82.8 km^{2} (32.0 sq mi)

Population
  - Total: 5,464
  - Density: 66.0/km^{2} (171/sq mi)
- Community number: 921, 922, 923, 924, 925

Al Yalayis (Arabic:الياليس) is a community of the Emirate of Dubai, in the United Arab Emirates. Administratively it is part of the Sector 9 and is located in the central area of Dubai.

== Territory ==
The territory of the community occupies an area of 44.7 km^{2} which develops in a non-urban area in the central area of Dubai, in the area between Emirates Road (E 611) and Lehbab Road (E 77). The territory is crossed by Al Qudra Street (D 63).

== Communities ==
Al Yalayis is divided into five communities:

- Al Yalayis 1 (community code 921), in the northern area;
- Al Yalayis 2 (community code 922), in the central-western area;
- Al Yalayis 3 (community code 923), in the south-eastern area;
- Al Yalayis 4 (community code 924), in the south-central area
- Al Yalayis 5 (community code 925), in the south-western area.

The territory is mostly desert and the settlements are concentrated in the areas of Al Yalayis 1 and 2:

- Mira. It is a residential development project by Emaar Properties covering an area of approximately 130 hectares in the western area of Al Yalayis 1, at Al Qudra Street. The project was started in 2013 and completed in 2017. It has over 18,000 housing units consisting of individual villas and 3- and 4-bedroom townhouses. Within the area is a Spinneys retail outlet, a mosque, Dubai British School Mira, community parks, and jogging and cycling trails.
- Mira Oasis. It is a residential development project by Emaar Properties covering an area of approximately 88 hectares in the northwestern area of Al Yalayis 1, adjacent to Mira, at the intersection of Al Qudra Street and Emirates Road. The project was completed in December 2019. It features over 1,300 townhouses in 3 and 4 bedroom configurations. The architecture of the houses is inspired by contemporary styles of the 21st century.
- Town Square. It is a residential development project by NSHAMA covering an area of approximately 300 hectares in the northern area of Al Yalayis 2, at the intersection of Al Qudra Street and Emirates Road. The development was started in March 2015 and is still under development. NSHAMA has projected a time frame for completion of the entire project of 10 years. The complex includes 3,000 townhouses and 18,000 apartments located around a large community park of approximately 3 hectares. The development will also include a 180-room luxury Vida Hotel and a cinema.

== See also ==
- List of communities in Dubai
- History of the UAE
