= Al Bada =

Al Bada'a البدع
- Community
- Interactive map of Al Bada'a
- Coordinates: 25.21977°N 55.26466°E
- Country: United Arab Emirates
- Emirate: Dubai
- City: Dubai

Area
  - Total: 0.82 km^{2} (0.32 sq mi)

Population (2000)
  - Total: 18,816
  - Density: 23,000/km^{2} (59,000/sq mi)
- Community number: 333

Al Bada'a (Arabic: البدع) is a locality in Dubai, United Arab Emirates (UAE). Al Bada is located in western Dubai and is bordered by the localities of Jumeirah, Al Hudaiba and Al Satwa.

Al Bada is largely residential and is bounded by D 92 (Al Wasl Road) and D 90 (Al Satwa Road). The Iranian Hospital is located in Al Bada.
