= Bu Kadra =

Bu Kadra بو كدره
- Community
- Interactive map of Bu Kadra
- Coordinates: 25.17706°N 55.32449°E
- Country: United Arab Emirates
- Emirate: Dubai
- City: Dubai

Area
  - Total: 1.7 km^{2} (0.66 sq mi)

Population (2000)
  - Total: 195
  - Density: 110/km^{2} (300/sq mi)
- Community number: 611

Bu Kadra (Arabic: بو كدره) is a small, developing locality in Dubai, United Arab Emirates (UAE). Bu Kadra is situated south of Dubai Creek, adjacent to Ras Al Khor Industrial Areas. The community is part of Dubai Municipality's expansion, south of the Creek. Historically, Bu Kadra was not a residential area, but housed various community and sports clubs. The Dubai government has undertaken to develop Bu Kadra into Meydan City, a horseracing real estate project.
