= Al Jafilia =

Al Jafiliya الجافلية
- Community
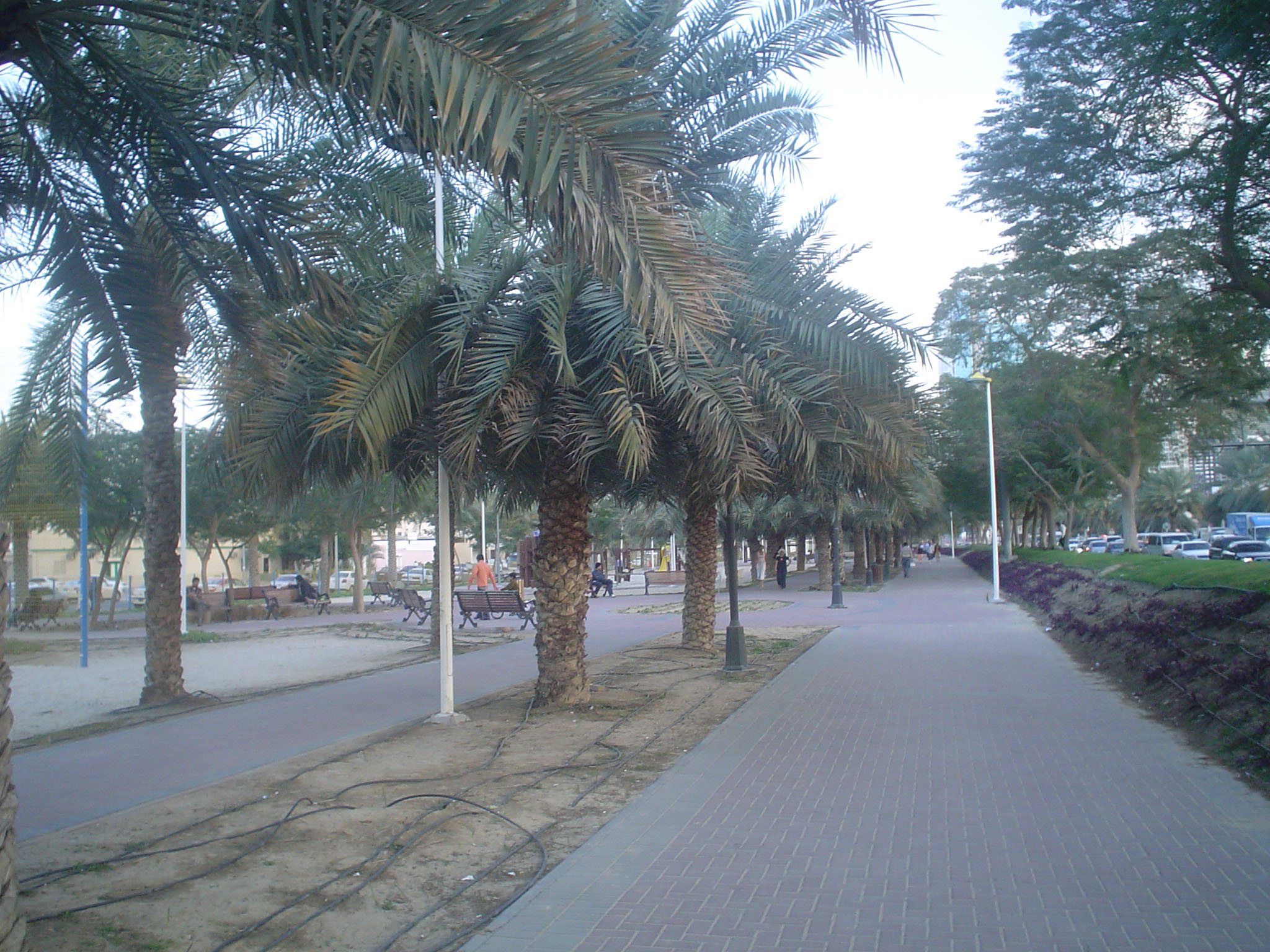
- Public park in Jafilia
- Interactive map of Al Jafiliya
- Coordinates: 25.23918°N 55.28501°E
- Country: United Arab Emirates
- Emirate: Dubai
- City: Dubai

Area
  - Total: 1.63 km^{2} (0.63 sq mi)

Population (2000)
  - Total: 11,619
  - Density: 7,130/km^{2} (18,500/sq mi)
- Community number: 323

Al Jafiliya (Arabic: الجافلية), also written Jafilia is a community in Dubai, United Arab Emirates primarily composed of private residential dwellings but also including Dubai's Department of Naturalization and Residency, Rydges Plaza Hotel and Al Hana Center shopping mall. It also includes Ministry of Interior and has a metro station for its residents.
