= List of Emirati artists =

The following list of notable Emirati artists (in alphabetical order by last name) includes artists of various genres, who are notable and are either born in United Arab Emirates, of Emirati descent or who produce works that are primarily about United Arab Emirates.

== A ==
- Ebtisam Abdulaziz (born 1975), installation artist, and performance artist

== B ==
- Nidaa Badwan (born 1987) Emirati-born visual artist, photographer; raised in Palestine
- Fāṭimah al-Baqqālī (1974–2024), Emirati calligrapher, decorator, and visual artist

== G ==
- Tamara Al-Gabbani, Saudi-born fashion designer, television personality and model; raised in Dubai

== H ==
- Moosa Al Halyan (born 1969), surrealist painter
- Mohammed Saeed Harib (born 1978), animator, filmmaker
- Rahil Hesan (born 1978), fashion designer

== I ==
- Mohamed Ahmed Ibrahim (born 1962), conceptual artist

== K ==
- Mohammed Kazem (born 1969), video artist, sound artist, photographer, assemblage, and performance artist

== L ==
- Mattar Bin Lahej (born 1968), painter, photographer, and sculptor

== M ==
- Najat Makki (born 1956), contemporary visual artist
- Wafa Hasher Al Maktoum (born 1973), visual artist, designer, and curator

== Q ==
- Farah Al Qasimi (born 1991), photographer
- Khalid bin Sultan Al Qasimi (1980–2019), fashion designer

== R ==
- Abdul Qader Al Rais (born 1951), painter of calligraphy and abstract work

== S ==
- Abdullah Al Saadi (born 1967), conceptual artist
- Maisoon Al Saleh (born 1988), painter
- Abdulraheem Salim (born 1955), painter and sculptor
- Hassan Sharif (1951–2016), conceptual artist, writer
- Hussain Sharif (born 1961), conceptual artist
- Noor Al Suwaidi (born 1981) painter, curator

== See also ==
- List of Emiratis
- List of Emirati women artists
