= List of Emirati women artists =

This is a list of women artists who are notable and are either born in United Arab Emirates, of Emirati descent or who produce works that are primarily about United Arab Emirates.

== A ==
- Ebtisam AbdulAziz (active since 2005), contemporary artist.
- Azza Sultan Al-Qasimi (born 1973) is an Emirati artist and businesswoman.
- Farah Al Qasimi (born 1991) photographer.

== M ==
- Najat Makki (born 1956), visual artist.
- Wafa Hasher Al Maktoum (active since 2009), artist, curator.

== N ==
- Noor Al Suwaidi (born 1981) is an artist and curator from the United Arab Emirates.
- Nidaa Badwan (born 17 April 1987) is an artist who was born in the United Arab Emirates.

== F ==
- Farah Al Qasimi (born 1991) is a photographer from the United Arab Emirates.

== S ==
- Maisoon Al Saleh (born 1988), painter, sculptor.
- Shamma Al Bastaki (born 1996) is an Emirati poet and artist from Dubai.

== See also ==
- List of Emiratis
- List of Emirati artists
