= Sheikha Manal's Young Artist Award =

Launched in 2006 as an annual fine arts competition for emerging artists in the United Arab Emirates, under the patronage of Manal bint Mohammed bin Rashid Al Maktoum, President of Dubai Women Establishment and the founder of Dubai Ladies Club, wife of Mansour bin Zayed Al Nayhan, Deputy Prime Minister and Minister of Presidential Affairs, UAE. The prize money of the awards totals to USD 110,000 and divided into four main categories: Fine Art, Photography, Multimedia and Design.

== Judges ==
The award is juried by a different panel of industry professionals and senior artists every year. 50 artworks are shortlisted from the online open call applications, followed by the declaration of the winners at the gala award ceremony.

- 2006: Hassan Sharif, Dr.Najat Makki, Mohammed Kazem, William Lawrie, Ian Redelinghuys, Dr. Mazen Asfour, Nelda Gildam.
- 2008: Dr.Najat Makki, Jassim Al Awadhi, Nazeem Shafi, Patricia Mills, Kimberly Lund.
- 2009: Sheikha Lateefa bint Maktoum, Salwa Mikdadi, Judith Greer, Jassim Al Awadhi.
- 2010: Antonia Carver, Jack Persekian, Jassim Al Awadhi, Sultan Sooud Al Qassemi, William Lawrie.
- 2011: Hoor Al Qasimi, Rami Farouk, Hala Khayat, Patricia Mills.
- 2012: Khalil Abdulwahid, Rami Farook, Ebtisam Abdulaziz, Ramin Salsali.
- 2013: Antonia Carver, Maisa Al Qassimi, Marjan Farjan, Wafa Hasher Al Maktoum.

== Winners ==
- 2006: Sarah Ayoub Agha, Natalie Penderis, Nuha Hassan Asad Ali Hussain, Muna Al Ali, Roshni Armanani.
- 2008: Sarah Abdul Rahman Saifaei, Nazanin Irani, Nadia Hamidi, Darwin H. Guevarra, Raji Salem Al Sharif.
- 2009: Evan Paul Collisson, Rebecca Rendell, Nawal Khoory, Maitha Hilal Bin Demithan, Zainab Al Haj Yahya, Noor Abdullah, Afra Hilal Khalifan Bin Dhaher, Ayesha Salahuddin Al Janahi, Altamash Urooj.
- 2010: Fatima Mahuiddin, Zara Mahnmoud, Mohammed Hisham Hindash, Hamad Alansari, Aya Atoui, Saher Sheikh, Nishad Mohammed.
- 2011: Walid Al Wawi, Asma Belhamar, Raudha Al Ghurair, Omar Aly Mohamed, Bassim A.Eskander, Jetshri Bhadviya, Razan Daoud Khalaf, Lantian Xie, Deena Stevens, Arwa Al Absi Al Jundi.
- 2012: Saif Mhaisen, Amal Zainal Alkhaja, Nada Khalid Al Abdooli, Ali Aminu Monguno, Omnia El Afifi, Rasha Dakkak, Bao-Nhat Dinh Nguyen, Arwa Ramadan, Nargis Dhirani.
- 2013: Sarah Al Agroobi, Bahar Al Bahar, Nada Abu Shakra, Maitha Abdulla, Mohammed Shabanpoor, Fatma Fairooz, Hatem Hatem, Nasser Al Zayani, Sarah Al Agroobi, Tayma Bittard, Gabriella Gomez, Samar Idris, Bahar Al Bahar.

== See also ==
- Dubai Culture
