= Salwa Zeidan Gallery =

Contemporary art gallery

Salwa Zeidan Gallery is a contemporary art gallery located within the Hilton Capital Grand airport road Abu Dhabi (United Arab Emirates), founded by the Lebanese artist Salwa Zeidan in 1994 and reopened in 2009. The gallery is specialized in contemporary art and has exhibited such artists as Hassan Sharif, Mohammed Kazem, and Nedim Kufi.

== Artists ==
The gallery is known for collaborating with both emerging and renowned artists from UAE, Middle East as well as the rest of the globe. It currently works with over 60 artists, although it has official representation contracts with a select list of around 29. Some of the artists currently represented by the gallery are:

- Adonis
- Ahmad Farid
- Ayman Baalbaki
- Avelino Sala
- Arman Stepanian
- Barana Saadat
- Bashar Alhroub
- Dean William
- Fatema Al Mazrouie
- Fatema El Hajj
- Gita Meh
- Hussain Sharif
- Jawad Malhi
- Khaled Al-Saai
- Seoung Woo
- Kourosh Salehi
- Mahmoud El Dewihi
- Meriem Bouderbela
- Omar Zeidan
- Serwan Baran
- Racha Bennett
- Reem Al Faisal
- Reza Derakshani
- Rose Husseiny
- Salwa Zeidan
- Saurabh Narang
- Shiblee Muneer

== List of previous exhibitions ==
2026

What Your Voice Is Costing you, a book launch by Rouba Zeidan, 21, October 2026

SILENT FORCE Wael Hlal solo exhibition @ Salwa Zeidan Gallery, Jan 15- 206 Abu Dhabi UAE

2025

ABU DHABI ART FAIR, Abu Dhabi UAE, Nov 19-Nov 23,2025

PRESENCE, a group Exhibition @ Salwa Zeidan Nov 11-Dec 21, 2025 Gallery, Abu Dhabi UAE

TIMELESS NOW a @ Salwa Zeidan Gallery, May 7- July 7, 2025 Abu Dhabi UAE

DRAW ME THE ORIENT a group exhibition @ Salwa Zeidan Gallery, Feb 11-Mar 7, 2025 Abu Dhabi UAE

2024

UBU DHABI ART FAIR, Abu Dhabi UAE, 20 November - 2024

EVOKE & PROVOKE a Group summer Exhibition June 18 Sep 24 -2024

2023

- ABU DHABI ART FAIR 20 NOV – 26 NOV 2023
- MALHI DISORENTATION NOV 09 2023 – JAN 05 2024
- MENARTFAIR PARIS 15 SEP – 17 SEP 2023
- CARTHAGE DAYS TUNISIA 12 SEP – 2023

2022

- ABU DHABI ART FAIR 16 NOV – 20 NOV 2022
- ART MIX NOV 09 – DEC 31 2022
- UNLIMITED JUN 29 – 29 SEP

2021

- ABU DHABI ART 17 NOV – 21 NOV 2021
- REVIST REDISCOVER 10 NOV – 21 DEC 2021
- ART DUBAI 29 MAR – 03 APR 2021

2020

- ABU DHABI ART FAIR 16 NOV – 26 NOV 2020 VIRTUAL ART FAIR
- BREAK ART FROM THE MIDDLE EAST 25 FEB – 5 APR 2020

2019

- ABU DHABI ART FAIR 21 NOV – 23 NOV 2019
- TRANSPOSE GROUP EXHIBITION 11 MAR – 11 APR 2019

2018

- ABU DHABI ART FAIR 14 NOV – 17 NOV 2018

2017

- ABU DHABI ART FAIR 07 NOV – 11 NOV 2017
- BEIRUT ART FAIR 2017
- FOCUS OMAR ZEIDAN SOLO SHOW
- CUT & TIE HUSSAIN SHARIF SOLO SHOW 12 MAR – 01 JUN 2017
- TIMELESS A GROUP SHOW 13 FEB – 28 FEB 2017
- FOCUS OMAR ZEIDAN 11 JAN – 29 JAN 2017

2016

- EXPANDING HORIZONS A GROUP SHOW 25 JUN – 5 SEP 2016
- DIVERCITY A GROUP SHOW 17APR – 31 JUL 2016
- TALES FROM THE PAST FOUAD TOMB 21 MAR – 11 APR 2016
- A DIFFERENT SPRING OMAR ZEIDAN SOLO SHOW 10 FEB 27 FEB 2016
- MAN WHO BUILT A NATION FATEMA AL MAZROUIE 14 JAN 2016 07 FEB 2016

2015

- VLADIMIR ZINKEVICH RAINBOW IN WATER NOV 25 DEC 1 2015
- ABU DHABI ART FAIR 18 NOV 21 NOV 2015
- BAHREIN ART FAIR 12 OCT 16 OCTOBER 2015
- FRESH & LIGHT 01 JULY 30 SEP 2015
- FRIEZE ART FAIR 18 MAY 2015
- ZHUAND HONG YI SOLO SHOW 28 APRIL 2015
- BOOK TALK GREAT BODY NO DIET 16 APRIL RACHA ZEIDAN
- SHAPING SCEENS GALLERY 21TH ANNIVERSARY 15 APRIL 2015 – 15 MAY 2015
- HOW TO WRITE A BOOK IN 40 HOURS WORKSHOP 25 MAR 2015
- BE THE LIGHT Energy workshop 31 Jan 2015

2014

- Transformations a group exhibition 13 October 2014 – 5 November 2014
- Collective Chemistry Collective exhibition. Artist: Abdul Badi Abdul Musawwir, Alice Al Khatib, Dean Williams, Emmanuel Guiragossian, Fatema Al Mazrouie, Hassan Sharif, Hussain Sharif, Katya Traboulsi, Kourosh Salehi, Mandy Kunze, Mohammed Abu El Naga, Mahammed Kazem, Nasser Palangi, Nives Widauer, Salwa Zeidan, Hwang Seoung woo and Zhuang Hong Yi.
- "Transformations" solo exhibition by Omar Zeidan
- Beirut Artfair ( ME.NA.SA.ART) Artists: Salwa Zeidan, Hussain Sharif, Habib Fadel, Paul Guiragossian and Adonis
- Expanding Horizon I collective exhibition. Artist: Rahul Dutta, Adonis, Omar Zeidan, Hwang Seong- Woo, Fatema Al Mazrouie, Joelle Kudi, Alice Al Khatib, Marc Guiragossian, Rose Husseiny, Salwa Zeidan, John Van Alstine, Gheorghi Filin, Morvarid K. Chritch and Abdul Badi Abdul Musawwir
- "MUALLAQAT" Solo Exhibition by Adonis
- "Abu Dhabi calling Dubai" collaboration with Cube Art Gallery, Dubai. Artists: Abdul Badi Abdul Musawwir, Adonis, Daifallah, Bader Al Mansour, Fatema Al Mazrouie, Hala Al Khalifa, Hussain Sharif, Kourosh Salehi, Moataz Nazr, Nasser Palangi, Rahul Dutta and Saurabh Narang.

2013

- Abu Dhabi Art: Reza Derakshani, Hassan Sharif, Hussein Sharif, Reem Al Faisal, Fatema Al Mazrouie
- "New Beginnings" – opening of the Saadiyat showroom, collective exhibition. Artists: Reza Derakshani, Adonis, Hassan Sharif, Rose Husseiny, Katya Traboulsi, Qassim Al Saedi, Omar Zeidan, Thomas Israel, Kourosh Salehi, Dean Williams, Mohamed Ahmed Ibrahim, Morvarid K. Rahul Datta, Salwa Zeidan

2011

- Abdul Badi Abdul-Musawwir Solo Exhibition
- Art Dubai 2011

2010

- ADISS (Abu Dhabi International Sculpture Symposium)
- Sotheby's Auction, Doha, Qatar
- "Globe"
- Abu Dhabi Artfair 2010
- "Dropping Lines" Contemporary Emirati Art Show (with Hassan Sharif)
- Contemporary Romanian Art Exhibition
- Just Prints Show
- Bo Taslé d`Héliand

2009

- Adonis
- Abu Dhabi Art 2009
- NADIRA MAHMOUD
- Accrochages
- Rose Husseiny
- Contemporary Emirati Artists
- In Light
