= SIKKA Art Fair =

The SIKKA Art Fair is an annual event created by Dubai Culture & Arts Authority in 2011 as a commissioned art exhibition to showcase emerging artists from the United Arab Emirates. Originally focused on visual arts only but later widened its scope to cover film screenings, music, talks and workshops. Sikka takes place in Al Fahidi Historical Neighbourhood (al Bastakiya), The Arabic word sikka means alleyway.

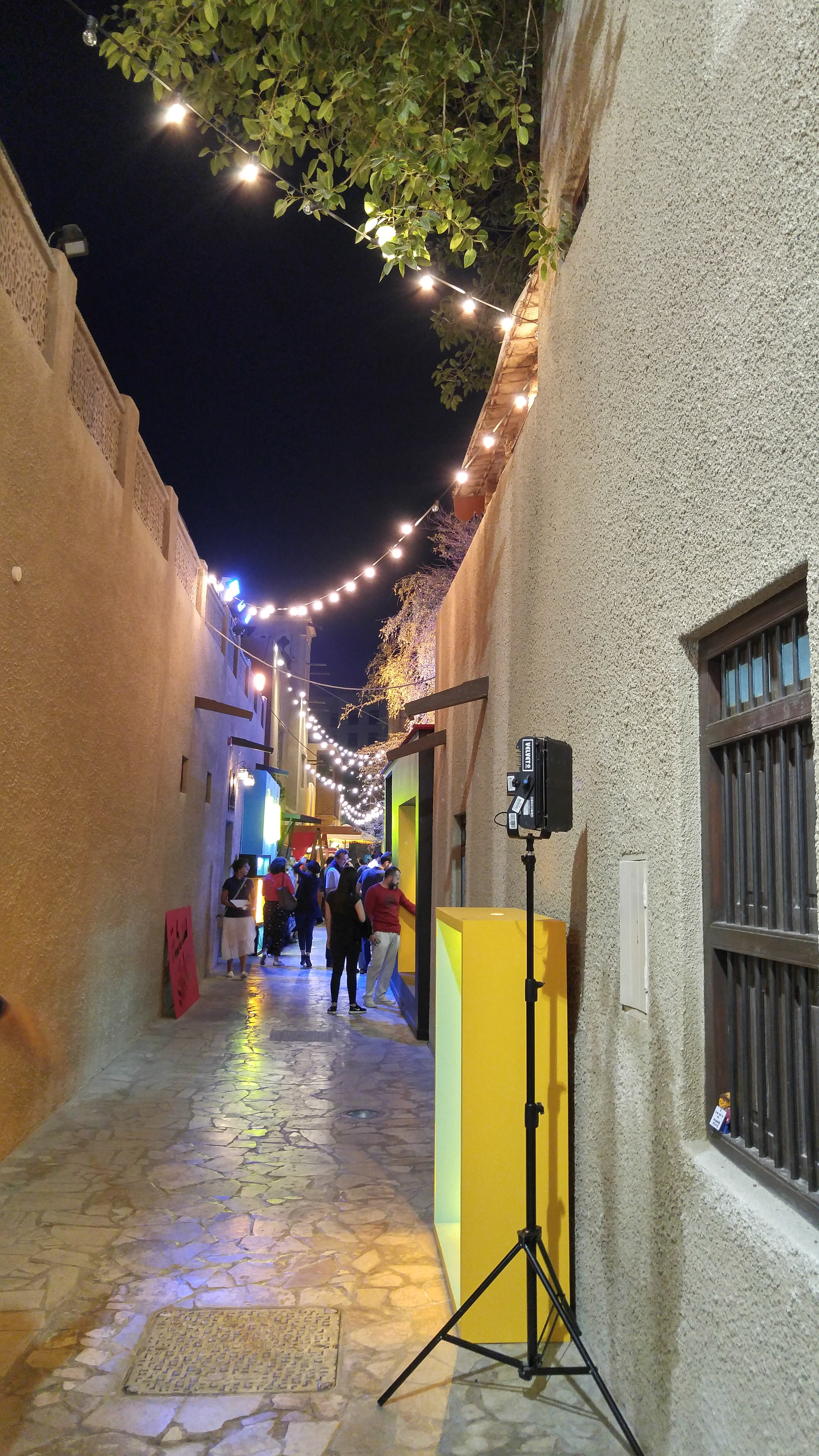
An alleyway in the Al Fahidi Historic Neighbourhood during the annual Sikka Art Fair

In its tenth iteration in 2022, Sikka expanded its scope to encompass a broader array of multidisciplinary practices, compared to its predecessors. This edition places a significant emphasis on design-oriented initiatives and technology-driven artworks. Moreover, Sikka introduced more immersive installations that combine multimedia elements, including video and photography, with research-based projects.

== Exhibitions ==
As of today, the Sikka Art and Design Festival has held 12 editions. The first edition took place in 2011, while the twelfth edition was held in February 2024 in the historic Al Shindagha district.

=== 2011 ===
The first edition took place from March 14 to March 21.

=== 2012 ===
For its second edition, the festival featured a selection of artists showcasing works in photography, mixed-media installations, and multimedia projects. Some of the selected artists included:

- Ebtisam Abdulaziz (Artist)
- Rami Farouk (Publisher)
- Khalid Al Najjar (Architect)
- Antonia Carver (Director of Art Dubai Festival & Fair)
- Salem Belyouha (Director of Projects and Events, Dubai Culture & Arts Authority)

=== 2013 ===
The 2013 edition took place from March 14 to March 24.

=== 2014 ===
The 2014 festival was curated jointly by Sheikha Wafa Hasher Al Maktoum, founder of FN Design, and Japanese architect Kayoko Limura, assisted by Yusaka Imamura. Initially scheduled for March 14-24, it was later extended until April 14.

=== 2015 ===
The fifth edition (March 14-24, 2015) was curated by Jalal Luqman and featured a diverse group of Emirati and UAE-based artists, along with three art collectives and two art initiatives. Featured artists included:

- Mattar Bin Lahej
- Abdul Qader Al Rais
- Dr. Najat Makki

This edition marked the official start of Dubai’s second art season, a major initiative by Dubai Culture, which also includes Art Dubai and Design Days Dubai.

=== 2022 ===
The 2022 edition highlighted the festival’s visual identity, represented by the "Sidra Al Fahidi" tree, a symbol of the Sikka artists’ community. The festival took place from March 15 to March 25.

=== 2023 ===
The 2023 exhibition attracted more than 120,000 visitors, who followed the creations of more than 200 artists and creators who decorated the rooms and walls of the houses of the Al Fahidi Historical Neighbourhood with their artistic productions, and interacted with dozens of workshops, panel discussions, entertainment and musical performances that took place during this year's edition of the festival.

=== 2024 ===
The 2024 exhibition saw the launch of 10 outdoor installations in the corridors of the historic neighbourhood of Al Shindagha and the display of 8 diverse murals, in addition to more than 100 artworks spread across 14 houses across the festival, each presenting different types of art, installations and digital works, sculptures and various interactive spaces. In addition, the festival offered more than 200 workshops and panel discussions.

=== 2025 ===
Expo 2025 was held from 31 January to 9 February in the historic neighbourhood of Al Shindagha as part of the Dubai Quality of Life strategy. More than 350 artworks and installations representing the work of Emirati and resident artists and young people from the UAE and the Gulf countries were exhibited.

== Sikka Art and Design Festival 2023 ==
The 11th edition of the Sikka Art and Design Festival, held from February 24 to March 5, achieved new milestones and record-breaking numbers. The festival welcomed over 120,000 visitors and featured more than 200 artists and creatives, who adorned the walls of the Al Fahidi Historic District with their artistic expressions. In addition to the stunning artworks, the festival offered workshops, discussion panels, live performances, and musical shows, enriching the overall experience.

Key Highlights of the Festival

- More than 500 artworks were displayed in 6 squares and 14 houses, most notably: Beit Sikkah, Beit Al Talli, Bait Al Ceramics, and Beit Al Photography.
- Nine outdoor installations dedicated to 'Art in Public Spaces' have been created, making Dubai an art museum open to the public.
- Sikka also showcased 6 monumental murals inspired by the spirit of Dubai and its heritage and traditions.
- Al Jalila Cultural Centre for Children at Bait Al Khaseef organised an exhibition of ceramic and clay masterpieces featuring a variety of ceramic sculptures.
- The festival launched the "SIKKA Speaks" initiative, which included 14 diverse dialogue sessions, presented by a group of artists and experts who shed light on the local and international cultural scene.
- Sikka offered interactive workshops, with more than 136 adult workshops attended by 600 visitors.
- The Little Sikka program included 100 workshops with the participation of 1,500 children. The programme was sponsored by Al Jalila Cultural Centre for Children and supervised by a group of experts and specialists in the arts and crafts sector.
- The festival saw the participation of 13 tenants who took the houses of the historic neighbourhood as exhibitions of the creations of artists from the UAE and around the world.
- A wide variety of musical and entertainment performances, film and poetry evenings were presented.

== Sikka Art and Design Festival 2024 ==
Under the slogan "Art Starts from a New Path", Sikka Art and Design Festival kicked off from the heart of the historic Shindagha neighbourhood from February 23 to March 3, 2024. The exhibition was opened by Her Highness Sheikha Latifa bint Mohammed bin Rashid Al Maktoum, Chairperson of Dubai Culture and Arts Authority and member of the Dubai Council, where she met with a number of Emirati, Gulf and other artists residing in the UAE.

Key Highlights of the Festival

- The festival focused on enhancing Dubai's march in supporting the system of art, creativity and innovation, in addition to enhancing the strength of cultural and creative industries and creating a sustainable environment for creators and artists, which falls under Dubai's cultural vision to consolidate the emirate's position as a global center for culture and an incubator for creativity.
- More than 500 artists and creatives from the UAE, the Gulf region and the Arab world participated in the 2024 festival. More than 100 artworks were displayed in 14 houses throughout the festival, including the "Gulf Digital House", "Present Archiving House", "Ceramic House", "Emirates Fine Arts Society House" and others.
- Al Shindagha Museum, the largest heritage museum in the UAE, has opened the doors of its pavilions to festival visitors. Sikka audiences explored Dubai's history and present by visiting 15 diverse pavilions: Children's House, Dubai Creek: The Birth of a City, House of Traditional Crafts, Adornment and Beauty, House of Perfumes, Traditional Medicine, House of Poetry, Dar Al Maktoum, Traditional Jewellery, Faith and Life, Contemporary Dubai, Community & Environment, Marine Life, Traditional Food and Saruq Al Hadid.
- The festival encouraged artists to spread the message of environmentally responsible art as many artists relied on the use of environmentally friendly and recycled materials in their works.
- The festival witnessed the launch of 10 outdoor installations in the corridors of Al Shindagha neighbourhood and the display of 8 various murals, which is in line with the strategy of 'Art in Public Spaces', a movement led by Dubai Culture to promote visual culture.
- Among the most prominent artworks are: the composition of "The Camel" by Sarah Al-Khayal, the designers of "Forget Yard Studio" inspired by "Al Mandoos", the works of "Reality" by engineers Mohammed Al-Hammadi, Musab Al-Hammadi, Ahmed Al-Attar and Omar Al-Hammadi, the composition "We and the Moon are Neighbors" by Sarah Kharbatly and more.
- The festival's agenda included about 250 dialogue and discussion sessions, workshops and initiatives, most notably performances, fine art and various experiences inspired by gastronomy, architecture, artificial intelligence, digital design, technology and sustainability.

== See also ==
- Al Bastakiya
- Sharjah Art Foundation
- Sharjah Biennial
- Emirates Airline Festival of Literature
- Tashkeel Dubai
- Latifa bint Mohammed Al Maktoum
- Dubai Design Week
- Culture of the United Arab Emirates
- Dubai Culture
- Al Shindagha
