= Abdulraheem Salim =

Emirati painter and sculptor (born 1955)

Abdulraheem Salim (born 1955) is an Emirati painter and sculptor born in Dubai and lives in Sharjah, United Arab Emirates. He is one of the first contributors to the fine art movements in the UAE alongside Hassan Sharif, Abdul Qader Al Raes and others. Salim completed his Bachelor of Fine arts and sculpture at the University of Cairo in 1981.

== Awards ==
- 1992 The Jury’s Award at Cairo Biennial
- 1993 Sharjah biennial 1st prize
- 1993 The silver award at the 6th Bangladesh Biennial
- 2008 State Honor Award for Fine Arts, UAE

== Exhibitions ==
- (1981-2001) The annual exhibitions of the Emirates Fine Arts Society
- (1983- 1984) First and Second GCC Art Exhibitions, Doha, Qatar
- 1983 Negative and Positive Exhibition
- 1988-1992-1995 Cairo Biennial
- 1995 Bangladesh Biennial
- 1990 The first exhibition of the Emirates Fine Arts Society in India.
- 1996 Arabian Colors Exhibition, Sharjah Art Museum, UAE
- 1998 the UAE in the Eyes of its Artists, Cultural foundation, Abu Dhabi
- 2000 The UAE Expo Hanover, Germany.
- 2001 Sharjah Biennial, UAE
- 2015 UAE Pavilion, Venice Biennial, Italy

== See also ==
List of Emirati artists
