= Culture of the United Arab Emirates =

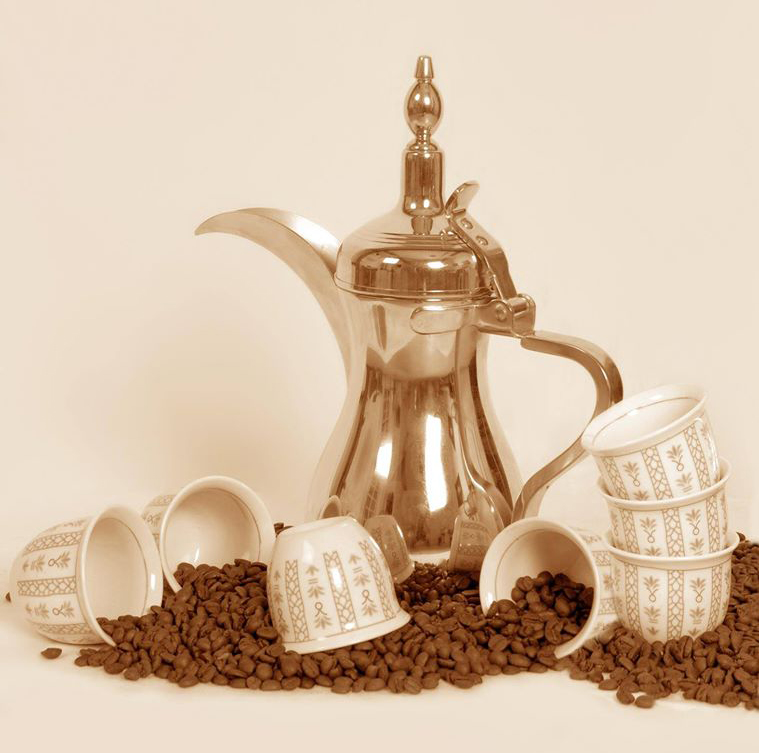
A dallah is a traditional Arabic coffee pot for serving Arabian coffee. It is a symbol of the Emirati culture, featuring on the United Arab Emirates dirham coin

The culture of the United Arab Emirates is part of the culture of Eastern Arabia. Its historical population was a small tribal community that changed with the arrival of an influx of foreign nationals in the mid-20th century. Emirati culture is a blend of Arabian, Islamic, and Persian cultures, with influences from the cultures of East Africa and Indian subcontinent. Islam has had a prominent influence on local architecture, music, attire, cuisine, and lifestyle. In cities such as Dubai, cultural experiences have evolved through a mix of traditional heritage and modern influences, reflected in festivals, arts, and social activities.

In the United Arab Emirates, the city of Al Ain in the Emirate of Abu Dhabi is a UNESCO World Heritage Site. The Emirate of Sharjah was named "The Cultural capital of the Arab World" by UNESCO in 1998 and the "Capital of Islamic Culture for 2014" by the OIC.

== History ==
Artifacts uncovered in the UAE show a history of human habitation, transmigration, and trade spanning over 125,000 years. The area was previously home to the Magan people known to the Sumerians, who traded with both coastal towns and bronze miners and smelters from the interior. A rich history of trade with the Harappan culture of the Indus Valley is also evidenced by finds of jewelry and other items and there is also extensive early evidence of trade with Bactria as well as the Levant.

== Arabic culture ==
The UAE's official language is Arabic, but English is widely spoken due to the country's diverse nature and economic globalization. Farsi, Hindi, Urdu, Bengali and Mandarin are also widely spoken by expatriates from Iran, India, Pakistan, Bangladesh, and China.

Native Emirati nationals speak the Gulf Arabic, which is similar to that spoken in other GCC countries and Iraq.

=== Naming conventions ===
Th first name is followed by “bin” or “bint,” which means ‘son of’ or ‘daughter of’, respectively, and the name of the father is followed by the family name.

After marriage, women retain their family names, and children take the name of the father.

== Architecture ==
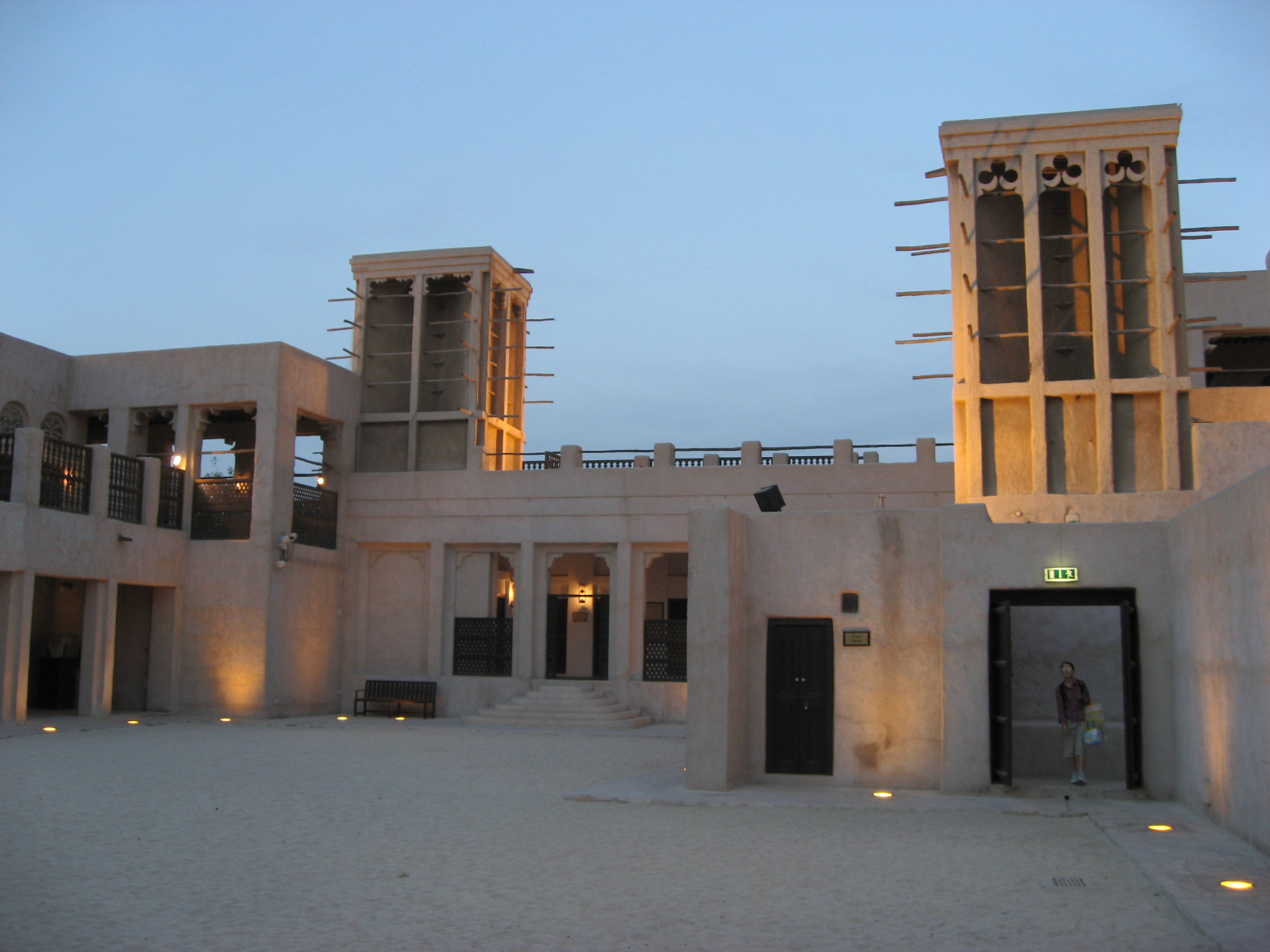
Sheikh Maktoum house courtyard featuring the common architecture of wind-catchers called Barjeel.

The United Arab Emirates' architecture is influenced by Islamic architecture and Arabian architecture. For example, the "barjeel" has become an identifying mark of traditional Emirati architecture and is attributed to Persian influence.

Emirati architecture reflects the traditional lifestyles and customs of the people. Building materials are simple but well-adapted to local living and climate. For migrant tribes, portable tents traditionally provided shelter during the winter season. Inland, more permanent houses were built of stone guss with roofs made from palm tree leaves. Fossilized coral, cut in blocks, bonded with sarooj or a seashell-derived lime mixture, and plastered with chalk and water paste, was used extensively in coastal regions.

A courtyard architectural layout was commonly seen in the vernacular architecture of the UAE such as houses, schools, mosques, and governmental buildings. The courtyard was a thermal regulator in hot and humid weather but also had privacy functionality. Privacy and ventilation are important components in traditional architecture of the UAE.

== Lifestyle ==
=== Clothing ===
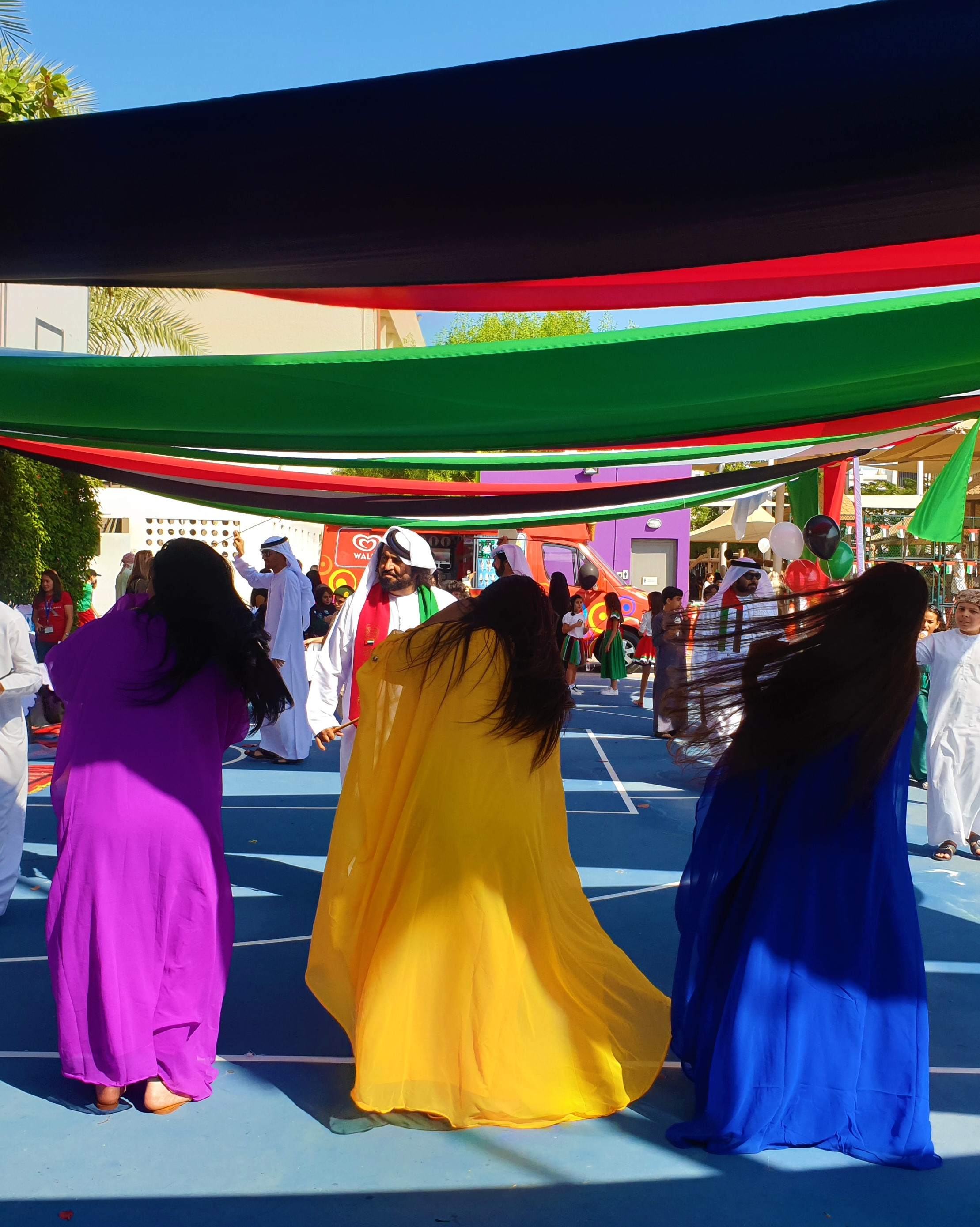
Women flip their hair sideways and wear brightly coloured traditional dress while performing an Emirati folk dance.

Many Emirati men and women prefer traditional Emirati clothes: the kandura and abaya.

Traditional clothing is designed for comfort in high temperatures and to keep with the Islamic religious beliefs in the country. Clothing that cover more parts of the body from the sunlight is preferred. Ballgowns are common in this area. Ballgowns are commonly adorned with silver and gold.

Colourful embroidered dressing is common during occasions such as weddings or dancing. A common dance in the Gulf Arab countries is the Khaleeji folk dance—also known as the Al Ayyala dance—which entails rows of women in close proximity to one another who move in a slow fashion while rhythmically swaying their hair from side to side. The dress is an important aspect of this dance.

=== Diet ===
The Emirati diet is a mixture of a Bedouin diet (meat and camel milk), a fishermen's diet (fish), and a farmer's diet (dates). These foods, along with key spices, such as cinnamon, saffron, and turmeric, form the basis of both historical and modern Emirati cuisine.

Vegetables that are easy to grow, such as cucumbers and tomatoes, are featured prominently in the diet. Dried lemons, called loomi, are grown locally and used in numerous dishes. Mangoes are also grown in the northern emirates. Meats traditionally used include chicken or small fowl, such as Houbara bustards, and goats. Since camels are highly prized for milk and as a means of transportation, camel meat is normally reserved for special occasions.

Muslims do not eat bacon, ham or pork, and they do not drink alcoholic beverages.

Harees is a national specialty; it is a porridge-like dish often served in Ramadan or during large celebrations like weddings. It is made with wheat, meat (or chicken) and salted water.

Other popular dishes include fouga, kabsa and luqemat. Common Middle Eastern cuisine is also widely available. Due to the cosmopolitan nature of the United Arab Emirates, the most popular street-side snack is the Middle-Eastern shawarma.

=== Greetings and social customs ===
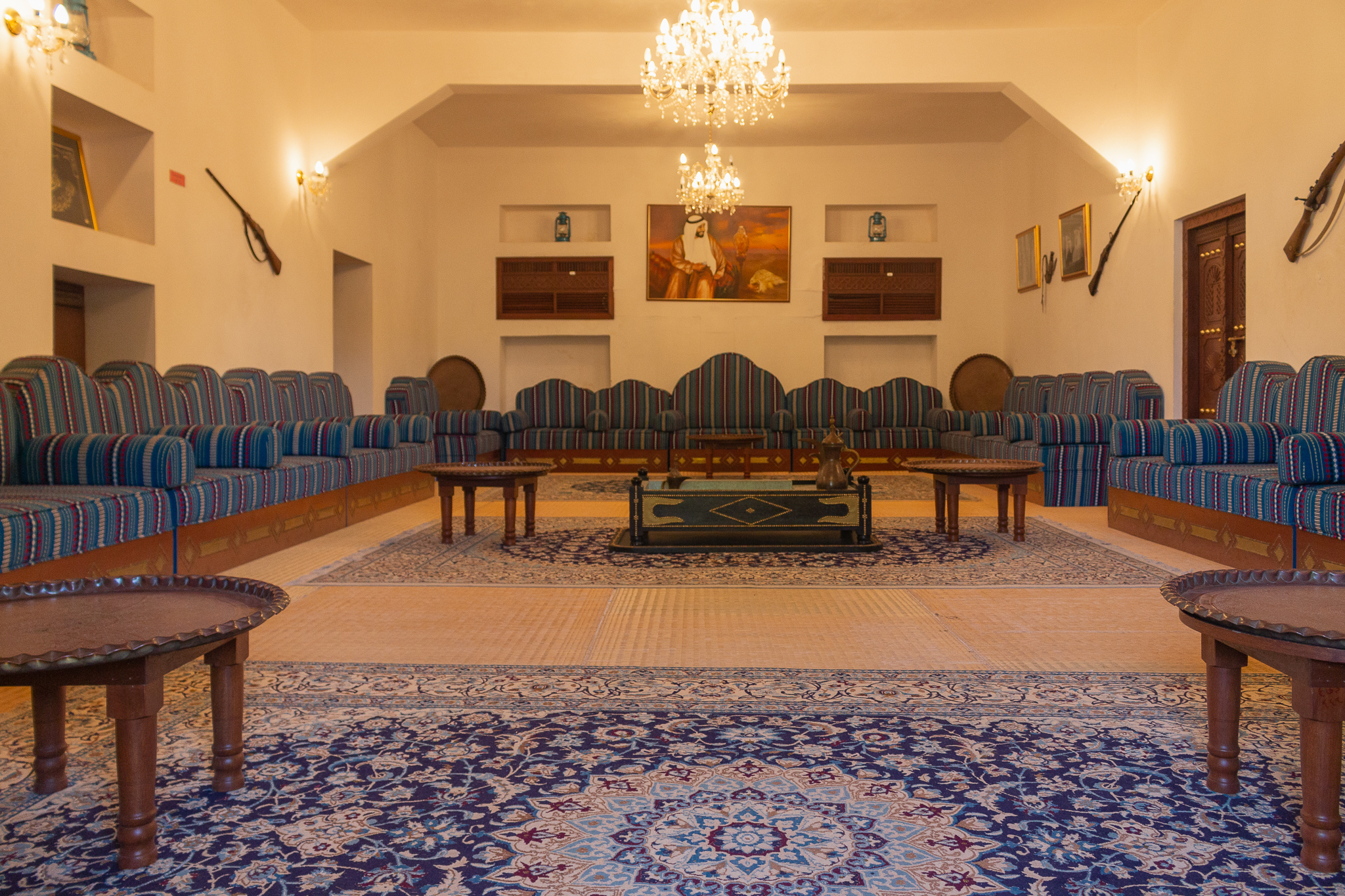
Majlis

When entering a Majlis, guests will start greeting individuals from the right side to the left side of the room, unless there is an elderly guests, who should be greeted first.The most common greeting is "As-salamu alaykum," which means "Peace be upon you." The response is "Wa alaykum as-salam," meaning "And upon you be peace." For men, the traditional Emirati greeting is the khushmak, or touching of the noses. Women greet each other by shaking hands and giving a kiss on the cheek. Kissing the top of the head is also a common way of greeting in the UAE. Members of the opposite gender should not embrace unless they are closely related.

After greeting guests, the host serves Emirati Coffee to the guests starting from the right side of the room and moving their way to the left of the room, it is also common for the host to serve the elderly guests first or an important guest in the room. It is also part of the Emirati social custom for the person serving coffee to hold the coffee pot "dallah" in their left hand and serve the coffee cup to the guest using their right hand. In a male gathering, the person serving the coffee will remain standing until the guest shakes their coffee cup to indicate that they do not want a refill, while in a female gathering, the woman serving the coffee is allowed to sit while serving others coffee. Less than half the coffee cup should be filled and the coffee being served should be hot to indicate to the guest that the coffee was specially made for them. For the guests, the coffee cup is taken with their right hand and given back using their right hand once done. These customs reflect the UAE's strong cultural traditions and the importance of respect, hospitality, and community in Emirati society.

=== Art ===
Notable Emirati artists include Hasan Sharif, Nujoom AlGhanem, Mohammed Ahmed Ibrahim and Najat Makki. Their work has been exhibited across major cultural institutions and arts districts in the UAE including the Saadiyat Cultural District in Abu Dhabi, and Jameel Arts Centre and Alserkal Avenue in Dubai.

=== Literature ===
==== Poetry ====
Modern poetry in the Emirati region occurred in the early 20th century. This period is also the first of three periods, in which the first generation had no formal education, the second stage where the generation saw the transition from rural living to an urban lifestyle, and the third generation who were largely university educated. Themes in Emirati poetry are diverse, ranging from satire, self-praise, and patriotism, to chivalry, religion, family, and love.

==== Drama ====
Drama in the Emirates are categorized into two, which are popular drama and intellectual drama. Texts from the former category are usually scripts performed for local stages and mainly written in Emirati dialect. These however narrows the viewership as the dialect is are to understand. Intellectual drama are written in al-fuṣḥā (Arabic: العربية الفصحى, romanized: the most eloquent Arabic) which helps attract a wider audience.

==== Fiction ====
Fiction written in short Arabic stories were being produced in the late 1960s and early 1970s and were targeted at specific audiences rather than the general public. The stories were widely circulated in Emirati magazines and newspapers by journalists which helped develop Emirati literature in the 1970s and 1980s

The first Emirati novel, Shahenda, was written by Rashid Abdullah Al Nuaimi.

=== Music, dance, and film ===
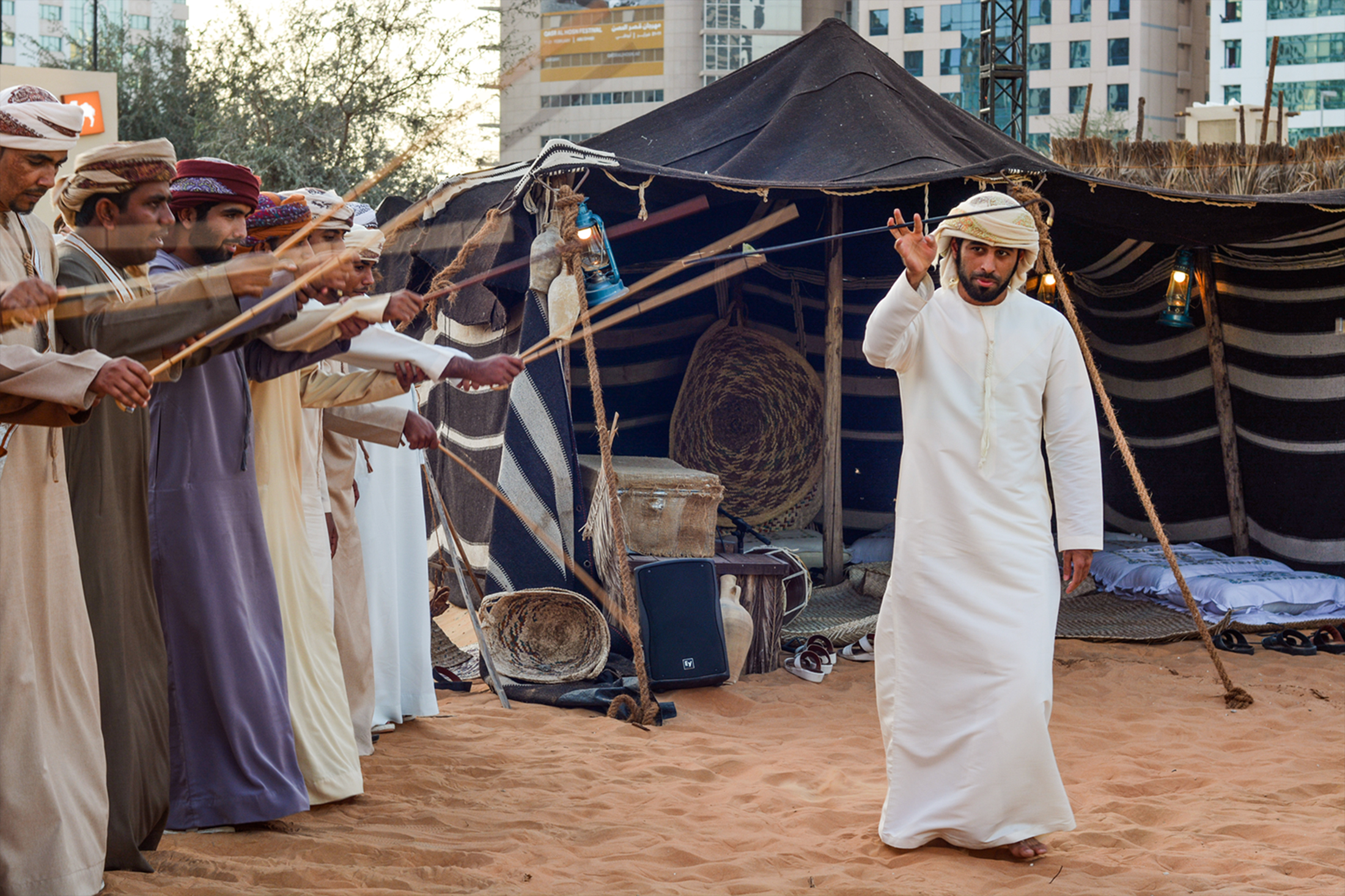
A band performs the Ayyala, which is a cultural dance derived from Arab tribes sword battles.

The United Arab Emirates is a part of the Arab khaleeji tradition. Yowlah, a type of music and dance also known as Al-Ayyala, has been registered by UNESCO as Intangible Cultural Heritage of Humanity in 2014. One of the UAE's most famous traditional singers is Mehad Hamad, who is known for singing patriotic lyrics and poems about the desert.

Many traditional songs and dances, handed down from generation to generation, have survived to the present time. Young girls would dance by swinging their hair, which was traditionally worn long, and swaying their bodies. Men often re-enacted battles or successful hunting expeditions using a weapon dance; such as the Yowlah.

=== Sports ===
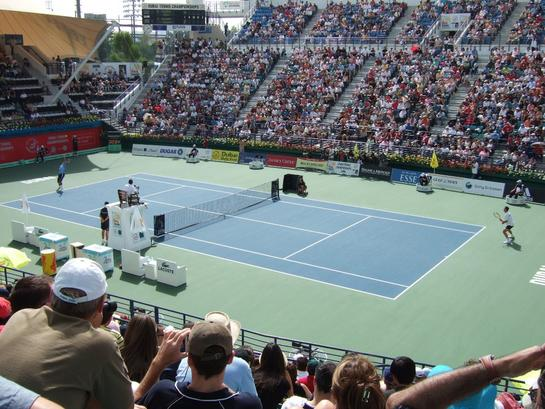
The Dubai Tennis Championships in 2006.

Football is the most popular sport in the UAE. Emirati football clubs Al-Ain, Al-Wasl, Al Nasr, Al-Sharjah, Al-Wahda, and Shabab Al-Ahli are the most popular teams and enjoy reputations as long-time regional champions. The UAE national football team qualified for the FIFA World Cup in 1990 along with Egypt. It was the third consecutive World Cup with two Arab nations qualifying, after Kuwait and Algeria in 1982, and Iraq and Algeria again in 1986. The UAE also won the Arabian Gulf Cup held in Abu Dhabi in January 2007.

Falconry was inscribed as Intangible Cultural Heritage of Humanity by UNESCO in 2021. Falconry is also considered an important cultural tradition in the UAE.

Inhabitants of Arab States of the Persian Gulf have enjoyed camel racing for many years, and it is considered a traditional sport. Formalizing camel racing was one way of maintaining its central role in UAE life. In the past, UAE had a reputation for exploiting South Asians as jockeys. However, robot jockeys are now used after strict government regulations were passed prohibiting underage jockeys from racing.

The UAE now has no fewer than 15 race tracks across the seven emirates. Nad Al Sheba Racecourse, 10 kilometers outside of Dubai, Al Wathba, 30 kilometers south-east of Abu Dhabi, and Al Ain track, which is 20 kilometers west of Al Ain, are all large, well-equipped camel tracks with high-tech facilities. Two smaller tracks are located in Sharjah, one in Ra's al-Khaimah and one in Umm al-Qaiwain. Others are spread throughout the desert areas.

=== Holidays ===
A lot of holidays in the UAE include Eid Al-Fitr, which marks the end of Ramadan, Eid Al-Adha and Arafah Day, both of which are celebrated during the Hajj period, the UAE National Day on December 2 and 3, which marks the formation of the United Arab Emirates, New Year on January 1, Commemoration Day on November 30 to honour those who died fighting for the UAE, the Islamic (Hijri) New Year, and the Prophet's Birthday (Mawlid).

Date	English	Arabic	
January 1	New Year's Day	Ra's as-Sana al-meladiah	رأس السنة الميلادية
Zil Hajjah 10	Day of the Sacrifice	Eid-al-Adha	عيد الأضحى
Muharram 1	Islamic New Year	Ra's as-Sana al-Hijria	رأس السنة الهجرية
Rajab 27	The Night Journey	Al-Isra'a wal-Mi'raj	الإسراء والمعراج
December 2	National Day	Yawm al watani	اليوم الوطني
Ramadan 29/30 Shawwal 1	End of Ramadan	Eid-ul-Fitr	عيد الفطر

== See also ==
- Cultural Policy in Abu Dhabi
- Demographic of the United Arab Emirates
- Tourism in the United Arab Emirates
