= Hussain Sharif =

Hussain Sharif (born 1961) is an Emirati artist based in Dubai, United Arab Emirates. Co-founder of Emirates Fine Arts Society and is one of the original "Five" conceptual artist in the UAE including Mohammed Kazem, Mohammed Ahmed Ibrahim, Abdullah Al Saadi and his brother Hassan Sharif.

== Group exhibitions ==
- 2010 Dropping Lines1, Salwa Zeidan Gallery, Abu Dhabi, U.A.E.
- 2010 Arab world meets Zurich1, AB Gallery, Zurich, Switzerland
- 2008 Selected UAE contemporary Artist Expo1, Zaragoza, Spain
- 2005 Cultural Diversity 1, Sharjah Art Museum, U.A.E.
- 2003 6th Sharjah International Art Biennial, Sharjah, U.A.E.
- 2002 Dhaka Biennial, Bangladesh
- 2002 5 UAE 1, Ludwig Forum for International Art, Aachen, Germany
- 1999 4th Sharjah International Art Biennial, Sharjah, U.A.E.
- 1998 U.A.E. Contemporary Art, Institute of Arab World, Paris, France
- 1998 The 7th Cairo International Biennial, Egypt
- 1995 Emirates Arts 1, Sittard Art Center, Sittard, Netherlands
- 1989 Exhibition of the Emirates Fine Arts Society the Soviet Union1, Moscow, U.R.S.S. (Russian Federation)
- 1983 Black and White 1, Al Ahli Club, Dubai, U.A.E.

== Solo exhibitions ==
- 2001 Sharjah International Art Biennial, Sharjah, U.A.E.
- 1992 Paintings, Oil and Collage1, Sharjah Cultural Center, Sharjah, U.A.E.
- 1981 Caricature, Arabic Cultural Club, Sharjah, U.A.E.

== See also ==
Emirates Fine Arts Society

Hassan Sharif
