= Latifa bint Mohammed Al Maktoum (born 1983) =

- Sheikha
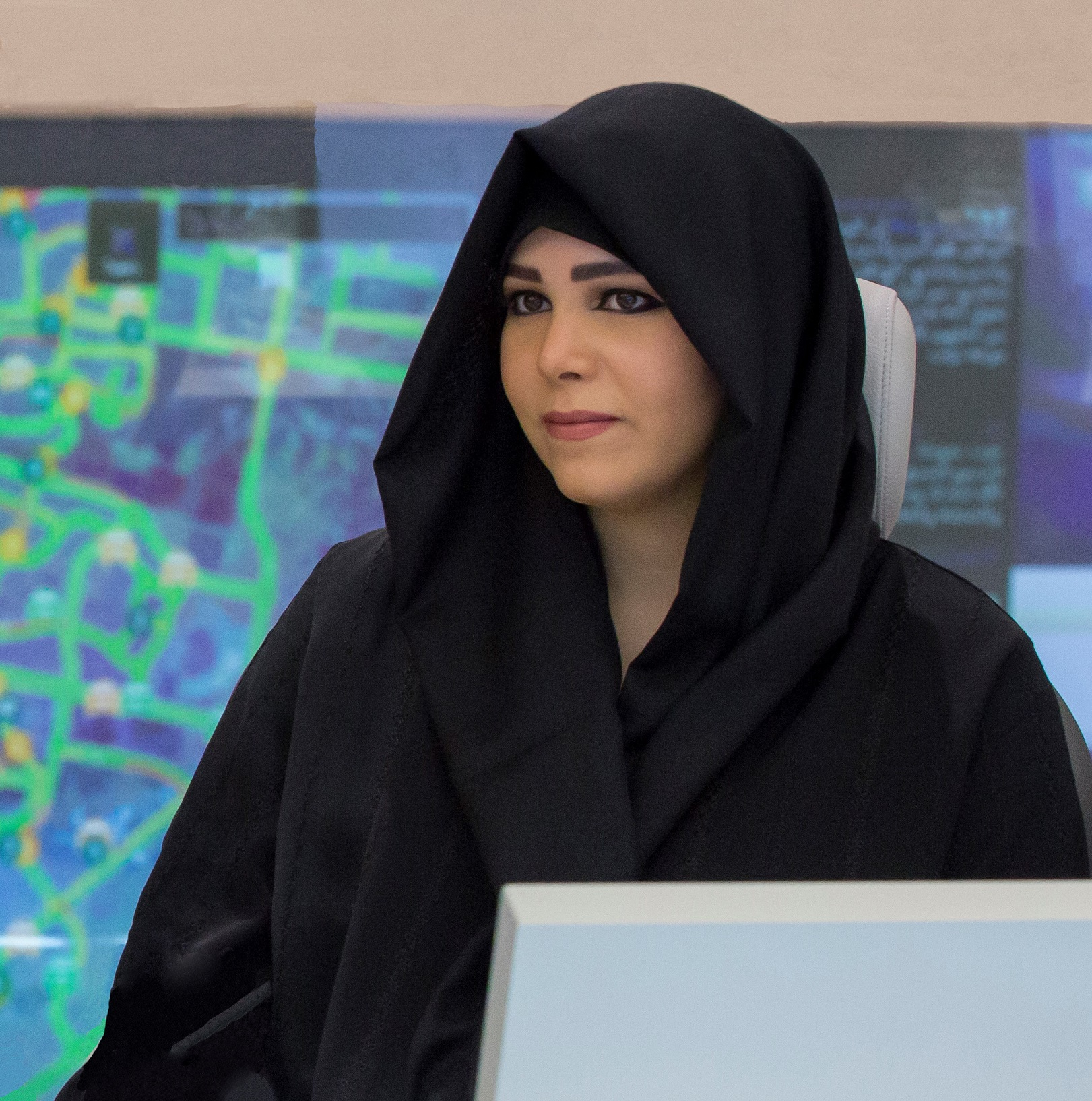
- Sheikha Latifa in 2019
- Born: 16 June 1983 (age 43); Dubai, United Arab Emirates
- Spouse: Faisal bin Saud Al Qassimi (m. 2016)
- Issue: Mohammed; Shaikha; Hamdan; Hind
Names
- Sheikha Latifa bint Mohammed bin Rashid bin Saeed bin Maktoum bin Hasher bin Maktoum bin Butti bin Suhail Al Maktoum
- House: Al Maktoum
- Father: Mohammed bin Rashid Al Maktoum
- Mother: Delila Aloula
- Occupation: Chairperson of Dubai Culture & Arts Authority

Sheikha Latifa bint Mohammed bin Rashid Al Maktoum (Arabic: لطيفة بنت محمد بن راشد آل مكتوم, romanized: Laṭīfa bint Muḥammad bin Rāshid Āl Maktūm; born 16 June 1983) is the chairperson of Dubai Culture & Arts Authority and a member of Dubai Council and the Executive Council of Dubai. She is also the vice chairman of Emirates Literature Foundation, a board member of Mohammed bin Rashid Global Initiatives and honorary president of the Association of Graduates of Zayed University in Dubai.

== Biography ==
Sheikha Latifa bint Mohammed Al Maktoum was born on 16 June 1983 to Sheikh Mohammed bin Rashid Al Maktoum, the Vice President and Prime Minister of the United Arab Emirates (UAE), and ruler of the Emirate of Dubai. Her mother Delila Aloula is a Lebanese woman. She graduated from Zayed University with an Executive Master of Business Administration with Honors and a Bachelor of Business Science in Marketing. Following her father's steps, Latifa, is passionate about equestrianism and poetry composition. Having been introduced to painting by her aunt and older sister when she was five years old, she refined her artistic skills as she grew up. She learned Kung Fu along with her sisters and has earned a black belt in Taekwondo.

In 2016, Sheikha Latifa married Sheikh Faisal bin Saud bin Khalid Al Qasimi. They have two sons and two daughters.

== Achievements ==
Sheikha Latifa launched a six-year strategic roadmap aiming at establishing Dubai as a worldwide cultural center, a thriving talent hub, and a regional creative incubator. The roadmap oversees a number of initiatives intended to promote and encourage the growth of cultural and creative industries in the region, including the "Dubai Creative Economy Strategy", as well as sponsoring a number of council meetings and sessions where they meet and listen to representatives from the cultural and creative community. She spoke at the Global Women's Forum in Dubai in 2020. Also, she spoke at the World Conference on Creative Economy 2021, which was hosted at Expo 2020 Dubai, in a "Sofa Session" titled "Accessible Creativity: Inclusivity & Diversity" with Becky Anderson, anchor of CNN's Connect the World and CNN Abu Dhabi Managing Editor. Latifa starred in her first ever cover shot, in the 50th issue of Vogue Arabia.

== Career ==
Sheikha Latifa has played a role in supporting the art and culture scene since the beginning of her career in the government sector with the Dubai Culture & Arts Authority, which was established in March 2008. She is responsible for the cultural and creative scene, such as the Dubai Creative Economy Strategy, which aims to transform Dubai into a preferred global destination for cultural, creative and artistic talent, and the capital of the creative economy by 2025. She also works to provide all forms of support towards the literature sector and the culture of reading, through several initiatives, most notably the development of Dubai public libraries, with the aim of making reading and acquiring knowledge accessible to everyone in Dubai, by providing integrated, comfortable and modern facilities.

Before joining the Dubai Culture and Arts Authority in 2008, Sheikha Latifa obtained practical training at Dubai Holding Group. She was named the Commission's Chairman in 2019. Sheikha Latifa encourages and supports community cultural activities that contribute to the development of the environment and infrastructure of Dubai's Cultural and Creative sector, as well as the integration of culture into the public sector. The most prominent activities are:

- Emirates Airline Festival of Literature
- Al Quoz Creative Zone
- Dubai Collection
- Dubai Art Season
- Dubai Design Week
- Dubai Watch Week
- Sikka Art Fair

== Positions ==
A creative catalyst, Sheikha Latifa holds several roles and responsibilities in the government of Dubai in the cultural and arts sector. On 5 September 2019, she was appointed the Chairperson of Dubai Culture & Arts Authority, after holding many positions in the authority since joining it in 2008. She also holds the following positions:

- Member of Dubai Council
- Member of the Executive Council of Dubai
- Vice Chairman of Emirates Literature Foundation
- Chairperson of development of Al Quoz Creative Zone Committee
- Chairperson of the Dubai Collection’s Steering Committee
- Board member of Mohammed bin Rashid Global Initiatives

== Awards ==
In 2021, Sheikha Latifa received the "First Arab Lady" award from the Arab Women's Authority in recognition for her role in the cultural and creative sector in Dubai and supporting innovative cultural initiatives that enrich Emirati and Arab culture.
