= Abdullah Al Saadi =

Emirati artist

Abdullah Al Saadi (born 1967) is an Emirati artist and one of the Pioneer "Five" original conceptual artists from the United Arab Emirates including Hassan Sharif, Hussain Sharif, Mohammed Kazem, and Mohammed Ahmed Ibrahim.

== Exhibitions ==
- 2013 Emirati Expressions at Manarat Al Saadiyat, Abu Dhabi, UAE
- 2013 Body Art and Performance in the Gulf Area: 16 artists at New York University Abu Dhabi, UAE
- 2011 Sharjah Biennial 10, Sharjah, UAE
- 2011 54th International Art Exhibition of the Venice Biennale, Venice, Italy
- 2009 53rd International Art Exhibition of the Venice Biennale, Venice, Italy
- 2005 Languages of the Desert at Kunstmuseum Bonn, Germany
- 2004 the 26th São Paulo Biennial, São Paulo, Brazil
- 2003 Sharjah Biennial 5, Sharjah, UAE
- 2002 The Art of the Five from the United Arab Emirates at the Ludwig Forum for International Art, Aachen, Germany.
