= Moosa Al Halyan =

Emirati surrealist painter

Moosa Al Halyan (born 1969) is an Emirati surrealist painter from Dubai, United Arab Emirates and a member of the Emirates Fine Arts Society.

In 1984 when Moosa Al Halyan was 16, Moosa decided to share his work and participate in exhibitions. Moosa Al Halyan chose always chooses to draw the horse because he believes that when he chooses to draw an animal, rather than the human himself, you can escape issues of discrimination and racism.

== Exhibitions ==
- 1984 Al Banoosh 2nd Exhibition, Al Wasl Club, Dubai.
- 1990 The 6th GCC Youth Exhibition, Abu Dhabi, UAE
- 1984, 86, 87, 88, 1990 The annual exhibitions of the Emirates Fine Arts Society
- 1995 Sharjah Biennial, Sharjah, UAE
- 1997 Sharjah Biennial, Sharjah, UAE
- 1996 Bangladesh Biennial 2015 The UAE Pavilion, Venice Biennial, Italy

== Awards ==
- 2012 EWA award in recognizing excellence in Innovation
- 2013 Dubai Government’s Excellence Programme.

== See also ==
- List of Emirati artists
