= Hala Badri =

Emirati cultural administrator

- هالة بدري
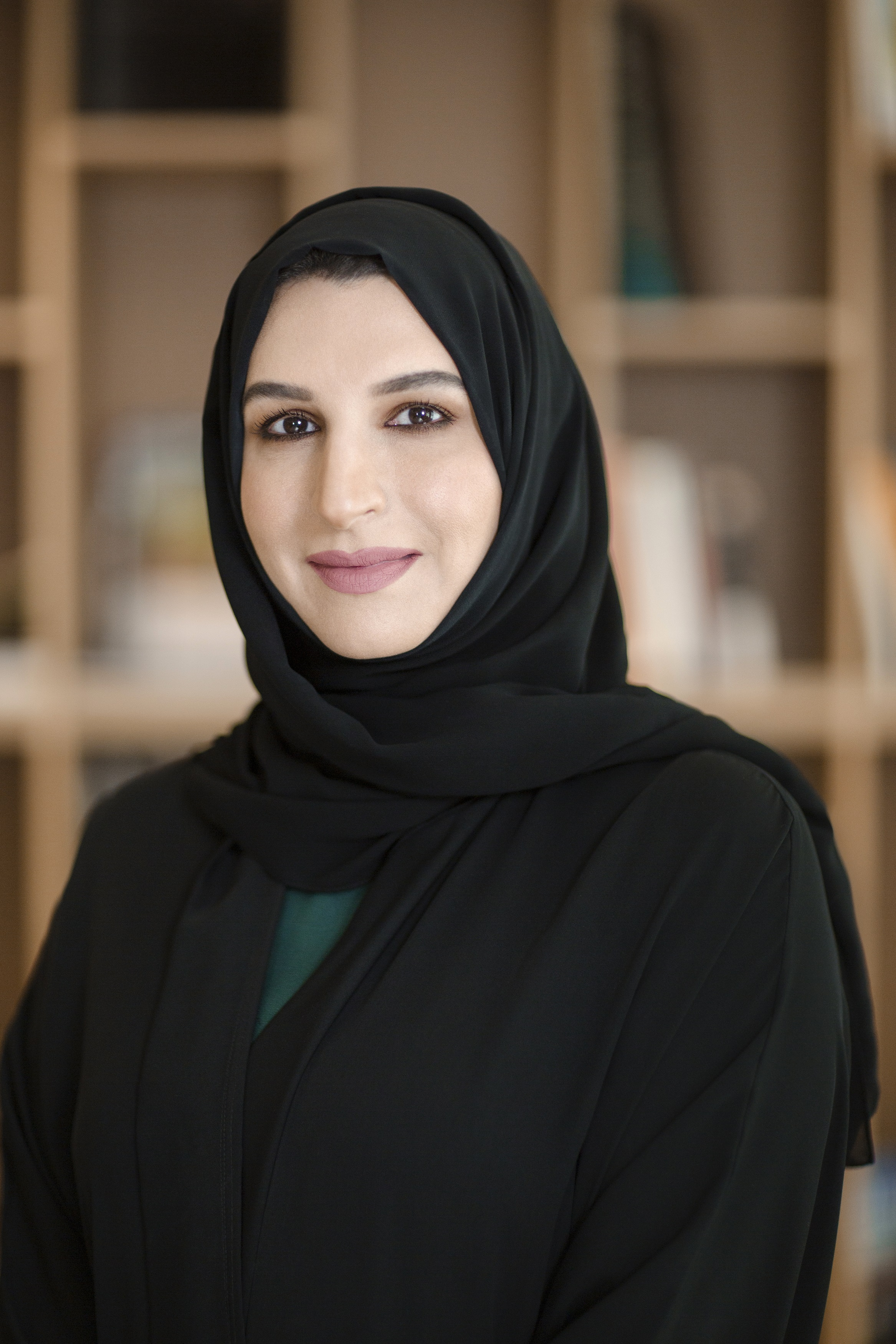
- Citizenship: Emirati
- Education: Zayed University (MBA); Higher Colleges of Technology
- Occupations: Director General, Dubai Culture and Arts Authority

Hala Badri (Arabic: هالة بدري) is the director general of Dubai Culture and Arts Authority. She was appointed to the role in 2019 after senior communications roles at ADNOC, du, and ENOC. She is also Vice Chairperson of the Dubai Women Establishment.

== Education ==
Badri is a certified director having completed the International Directors Program with INSEAD. She holds an MBA in Managing e-Business from Zayed University, and a Higher Diploma in Communications Technology (Journalism) from The Higher Colleges of Technology.

== Career ==
In April 2019, Badri was appointed as the Director General of Dubai Culture and Arts Authority by decree of Mohammed bin Rashid Al Maktoum, Vice President and Prime Minister of the UAE and Ruler of Dubai.

Prior to joining Dubai Culture, Badri was a senior advisor on strategic communications for Abu Dhabi National Oil Company (ADNOC). During her tenure with ADNOC she was also seconded to the National Media Council as a senior consultant to oversee the content strategy and visitor experience for the UAE National Pavilion at Expo 2020 Dubai. Before ADNOC, she spent 11 years at du, as Executive Vice President of Brand and Communications. From 1998 to 2005 she was Director of Corporate Communications at ENOC Group.

In addition to her current role as Director General of Dubai Culture and Arts Authority, Badri holds several board positions across key institutions in the UAE. She serves as the Vice-Chairperson for the Dubai Women Establishment Board of Directors, and as the Vice-Chairman of the Hamdan Bin Mohammed Bin Rashid Al Maktoum International Photography Award (HIPA) Board of Trustees. She is also a member of the Board of Dubai Media Council, the Board of Trustees of Al Maktoum Archives, the Board of Trustees of the Higher Colleges of Technology, and the Board of Trustees of the Rashid and Latifa Schools Establishment. Furthermore, she is a member of the Board of Governors at Citizens School.

== Achievements ==
In 2003, Badri was twice awarded the Sheikh Rashid Award for Scientific Excellence, for outstanding academic achievement during her earlier education. In 2012, she was also named as the 21st most powerful and influential personality in the Middle East's media, marketing and advertising industry in Communicate magazine's Power List 2012. She was named as The Holmes Report's 2018 Innovator 25 in EMEA, ranked at 33 of Forbes ME 200 most powerful Arab women in the World in 2014, and at 37 of 100 most powerful Arab business women in Listed Companies in 2012. In May 2024, she was also named one of Fast Company Middle East's 43 Most Creative People in Business in the Bringing Good Things To More People category, in recognition of her role in transforming the creative and cultural sector in Dubai. In January 2025, she won the Gold Award for Most Innovative Woman of the Year at the MENA Stevie Awards, in addition to the Silver award for Thought Leader of the Year. In February 2025, she was awarded the Lifetime Achievement Award in Dubai Quality Group's 20th cycle of the Emirates Women Award. She was also featured on Arabian Business's 100 Most Inspiring Leaders List 2024, and placed 11th on Arabian Business's 100 Most Inspiring Women 2025. In 2025, she was also named among the Top 50 Visionary Women by Entrepreneur Middle East and recognised by Finance World as one of the 50 most influential businesswomen in the UAE.
