= Shamma Al Bastaki =

Emirat artist and poet

- Born: 1996 (age 29–30); Dubai
- Education: New York University Abu Dhabi, Harvard University
- Occupations: Poet, Artist
- Awards: ADMAF TOTAL Visual Arts Award, ADMAF Creativity Award, NYU President's Service Award, Harvard CMES Best Thesis Prize,

Shamma Al Bastaki, _{Arabic: شما البستكي} (born 1996) is an Emirati poet and artist from Dubai.

Al Bastaki holds a master's degree from Harvard University and a bachelor's degree from New York University Abu Dhabi. She completed diplomatic training at the Anwar Gargash Diplomatic Academy, earning a postgraduate diploma in Diplomacy and International Relations in 2021. She is also an ambassador for Louvre Abu Dhabi, as well as the recipient of awards for her writing and art. Al Bastaki co-founded several literary networks, including JARA Collective, Untitled Chapters, and is a member of the Cultural Office Women's Creative Network. In 2019, she won the ADMAF Creativity Award for her poetry collection "Bait La Bait (بيت لبيت)", an excerpt of which was published in the Asymptote Journal and taught in universities in Japan, Taiwan, and the US. Her poems 'The Sparrows are Waiting' and 'Veto on the Feminine Noon' were published in the Harvard Graduate Review.

== Biography ==
Al Bastaki was born in Dubai in 1996. She double majored in Social Research and Public Policy as well as Literature and Creative Writing at NYU Abu Dhabi, a portal campus of New York University. In 2015 she began her role as a student ambassador for Louvre Abu Dhabi and was commissioned by the museum on several projects, including a collaboration with Jenny Holzer Studios. Her article 'Rethinking Universality' has been taught at NYU's 'Museums in a Global Context' course yearly since it was published.

A poet since she was seven-years-old, she has written hundreds of poems and completed her first full volume of poetry 'House to House بيت لبيت’ in 2018, an excerpt of which was published in the journal Asymptote. The three-volume collection of ethnopoetry and photography was based on oral histories from the Dubai Creek communities, presented creatively in the form of poetry.

She was one of the inaugural members of the Cultural Office Women's Creative Network, which was launched by HH Sheikha Manal Bint Monammed Bin Rashed Al Maktoum. She is also a founding member of Untitled Chapters – a literary group for Emirati women writers founded by Fatma Al Bannai in 2011. She is the co-founder of the JARA Collective, a chapbook publishing press with a focus on making Chapbooks and experimental writing, with sister presses in New York, Bangalore, and Paris. She has spoken at many literary events, including the Emirates Literature Festival, the Al Burda Festival, the Hay Festival, and served as co-curator of Hekayah: The Story for two years. She has performed her work in London, Washington D.C., New York City, and Boston, and across the Emirates.

In addition to her work as a poet, she is also a visual artist and was nominated as part of the Salama Bint Hamdan Emerging Artists Fellowship (Cohort 6), a ten-month intensive arts education program taught by faculty from the Rhode Island School of Design. Her final sculpture, photography, and film installation 'El Ash' was exhibited at Warehouse 421 at the 'Community and Critique' group show. Her work includes calligraphy, having won an Abu Dhabi Festival TOTAL Visual Arts Award for her calligraphy-based painting 'Writes with a Knife'.

As a graduate student at Harvard, she served on the board of the Harvard Arab Student Association as Cultural Chair for two years. Her thesis 'Al-Majaz: A Crossing', supervised Professor Steven Caton, won the Best Thesis Award at the Harvard Center for Middle Eastern Studies. During her time in Cambridge, she took courses at MIT, the Tufts Fletcher School of Law and Diplomacy, the Harvard Law School, and the Harvard Kennedy School of Government.

== Awards ==
- Harvard CMES Best Thesis Award (2022)
- Salama Bint Hamdan Emerging Artists Fellowship
- ADMAF Creativity Award (2019)
- NYU President's Service Award (2018)
- Abu Dhabi Festival Visual Arts Award – 2nd place (2016)
- International Science and Engineering Fair (ISEF), Los Angeles - 2nd Place Award (2014)
