= Dubai Culture =

UAE governmental authority

Dubai Culture and Arts Authority
- هيئة الثقافة والفنون

Agency overview
- Formed: 8 March 2008
- Jurisdiction: Emirate of Dubai
- Headquarters: Dubai, United Arab Emirates
- Agency executives: Latifa bint Mohammed Al Maktoum, Chairman; Hala Badri, Director General
- Website: dubaiculture.gov.ae

Dubai Culture (Arabic: هيئة الثقافة والفنون) is an authority under Government of Dubai in the United Arab Emirates, which works in preservation of the cultural heritage and support of cultural scene in Dubai.

== History ==
Established in 2008 by Mohammed bin Rashid Al Maktoum, Vice President of the UAE and Ruler of Dubai, as an entity to manage and support the art and culture infrastructure in the Emirate as well as preservation of the cultural heritage. The authority was part of Dubai's 2015 strategy for cultural development. In September 5th, 2019, Latifa Bint Mohammed Bin Rahsid Al Maktoum was appointed the Chairperson of the authority and in 2019 Hala Badri was appointed Director General of the organisation.

== Projects ==
- A.I.R Dubai: an annual art residency for artists and curators in the UAE and elsewhere, to be based in Al Fahidi Historical Neighborhood to work together and produce new work.
- SIKKA Art Fair: an annual happening showcasing emerging artists from the UAE in the field of visual arts, performances, music and film.
- Al Maktoum Hospital Museum: the plans were announced in early 2014 to create the first museum dedicated to preserving the history of the hospital in the UAE. The museum will be located within the original hospital building, which was built in 1951.
- Dubai Festival for Youth Theatre: an Annual festival Aims at promoting local theatre talents.
- Dubai Art Season: a week-long celebration of arts and culture in the emirate, featuring key events such as Art Dubai, Dubai Design Week, The Middle East Film & Comic Con and SIKKA Art Fair.
- Dubai Metro Museum: the Project were announced by Mohammed Bin Rashid Al Maktoum in 2014 to transform Dubai Metro stations into art museums, displaying artworks and creations from different art genres.
- Dubai Next: a collective of interactive discussions and cultural talks led by several cultural personalities to underline Dubai's global identity as a hub for innovation in the creative scene. The first two editions took place in Paris and Basel, the third edition took place during the opening week of Expo Milano and on the evening of the 56th Venice Biennial.

== See also ==
- Art Dubai
- Al Sufouh Archaeological Site
- Culture of Dubai
- Tashkeel Art Hub
- Alserkal Avenue
