= Katya Traboulsi =

Lebanese artist (born 1960)

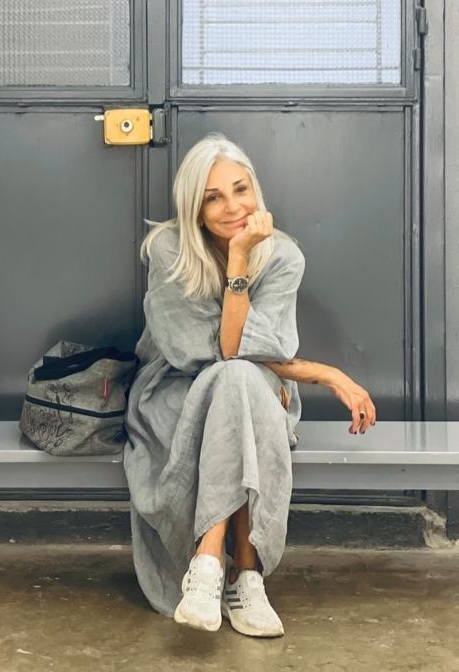
- Traboulsi in 2023
- Born: Katya Assouad; August 16, 1960 (age 65); Beirut, Lebanon
- Movement: Figuration Libre
- Spouse: Jean Traboulsi (m. 1989)
- Children: Yann Traboulsi, Gino Traboulsi
- Website: katyaassouadtraboulsi.com

Katya Traboulsi (Arabic: كاتيا طرابلسي, née Assouad; born in 1960) is a Lebanese artist whose work has been exhibited at venues including the Saleh Barakat Gallery in Beirut and the Victoria and Albert Museum in London. Her exhibition "Perpetual Identities" (2018) at the Saleh Barakat Gallery featured 46 hand-painted replicas of Lebanese war shells. Traboulsi's work incorporates elements from Lebanese cultural imagery, as documented in her published book "Generation War" (2013), which chronicles Lebanon's 1975–1990 civil war period through artistic interpretation. Her work has been acquired by institutions including the Sursock Museum in Beirut.

She is a Beirut-based multimedia artist whose practice is characterized by the emotional intensity with which she confronts the effects of the Lebanese civil war. Her paintings and sculptural works are characterized by her bold use of color.

== Early life ==
Traboulsi's interest in art was first informed by her grandmother's paintings, which led her to consider pursuing graduate studies in fine arts. She envisioned a career path in painting through studies in Paris after completing her foundational education in Lebanon, but her father's objections caused her to instead pursue interior design at the Lebanon School of Art in 1983.

Following her graduation, Traboulsi explored art galleries and exhibitions, and ran her own printing press, Systeco, where she also worked as a production manager from 1982 until 1988. After organizing a variety of different exhibitions for her painterly works in 1986, Katya married Jean Traboulsi in 1989, and they relocated to Dubai later that year.

In Dubai, Traboulsi worked at an advertising agency, Publigraphics, from 1990 until 1993. She then taught at the Lycée Georges Pompidou in Dubai for 8 years. In 2000, Katya opened the Katya Traboulsi Ateliers in Dubai and then later in Beirut, where the institution helped young artists progress in their careers.

== Work ==
Traboulsi's artistic timeline can be divided into two defining periods: the authorial expressionist phase of her earlier career, and the later period marked by collaboration, political engagement, and multidisciplinary approaches. These periods intersect in works spanning the mid-2000s to the early 2010s.

During her early period, Traboulsi aligned herself with the Figuration Libre movement, an artistic wave that emerged in 1980s France, characterized by the use of bold lines, intricate patterns, and whimsically-drawn human figures and environments. These early works were largely acrylic paintings. Katya's work during this period was created as part of her journey of healing and recovery from the Lebanese Civil War, which deeply influenced her artistic expression. Many of her works present complex and intense themes that mirror her own interpretation of life during the civil war. She continued to produce work in the manner of Figuration Libre in the 2000s and early 2010s, but began to engage in more pressing and political issues which she had previously avoided. Such issues included woman's rights as in Forbidden Words (2006), and the Lebanese civil war in Age of Rage (2012).

Continuing in the aesthetics of Figuration Libre, she painted diverse pieces inspired by essays written in 2011. In 2013, she curated the work of different photojournalists that were active during the Lebanese civil war in a body of work titled Generation War. Traboulsi documented history in a manner that emphasized these individuals' experiences at the time. They were presented either in texts by the journalists or in speech during the exhibition. Expressing her collaborative artistic philosophy, and referencing people who had documented and experienced war; she once stated, "I'm telling people's stories, not mine."

With her most recent projects, from the mid-2010s and on, Traboulsi worked in collaboration with artisans to produce works that valorized different national and local artistic traditions. One such project was Perpetual Identities, which consisted of a series of medium-sized missile mortars, handmade either by the artist or artisans commissioned by her. For a time, the project was an ongoing work of art. Traboulsi would make or commission two or three mortars, sell them to collectors, and then earn the money to make more mortars, hence the perpetuity of Perpetual Identities.

The initial inspiration of this project was a gifted mortar shell sleeve from the 1975 Lebanese civil war that she had received for her birthday. Considering how such an object was responsible for death, she created art around it that would idolize and pay tribute to those who fought against an 'enemy'. The idea behind Perpetual Identities was to turn these mortars which were symbols of war into symbols of peace and embodiments of identity and diversity. Each of the mortars featured imagery and the utilization of materials from 46 symbolic cultures. In a 2023 interview about Perpetual Identities, Traboulsi talked about how much she valued diversity.

In her work, Traboulsi has made use of different kinds of materials including acrylics, light-boxes, brass, resin, and iron. Traboulsi has produced work that is in line with different currents of expressionism, conceptual art, and pop art, and tackled themes such as celebrity, music, ethno-national identity, anatomy, freedom, and war. Her most recent exhibition at Saleh Barakat Gallery in Beirut, Rej3a Ya Mama (2022), largely consisted of ironworks inspired by Lebanese pick-up trucks.

Beyond her art, Traboulsi described herself as doing everything with a "scream of peace". In 2016, she returned to Beirut, where she has resided since.
