= Salwa Zeidan =

Lebanese artist, sculptor, and curator

Salwa Zeidan is a Lebanese artist, sculptor, and curator.

== Life ==
Zeidan was born in Bekaa Valley, Lebanon, Zeidan left Lebanon in the 1980s. Zeidan moved to the United Arab Emirates where she continued working as a painter. She curated exhibitions in different venues before she opened her Art Gallery in 1994. The Salwa Zeidan gallery is in Abu Dhabi.
