= Mattar Bin Lahej =

Emirati painter

Mattar Bin Lahej (born 1968) is a Famous Emirati painter, photographer and sculptor from Dubai. He founded Marsam Mattar, the first art gallery in the United Arab Emirates to be managed by an artist. Bin Lahej is also the artist and calligrapher behind the facade on the museum of the future, making it one of the most prominent buildings and structures in Dubai and is described as "the only building that speaks Arabic"

== Group exhibitions ==
- 2015 Sikka Art Fair, Dubai, UAE
- 2013 Emirati Expressions, Saadiyat Island, UAE
- 2012 Liquid Identity, Venice, Italy
- 2012 Signature, Manama, Bahrain
- 2012 First impression, Ludhiana, India
- 2011 Art Dubai, Dubai, UAE
- 2010 Acela Festival, Morocco
- 2010 Washington DC, USA
- 2009 Art Abu Dhabi, UAE
- 2009 Emirati Expressions, Saadiyat Island, UAE
- 1996 Sharjah Biennial, Sharjah, UAE

== Solo exhibitions ==
- 2012 Index, Dubai, UAE
- 2011 Index, Dubai, UAE
- 2010 Contemporary Istanbul, Turkey
- 2009 UAE Cultural Days, Germany
- 2009 "Movement of stillness” Mattar Gallery, Dubai.
- 2008 “Abu Dhabi in colors" Fair ground, Abu Dhabi

== See also ==
- List of Arab artists
- List of Emirati artists
