= Maisoon Al Saleh =

Emirati visual artist based out of Dubai (born 1988)

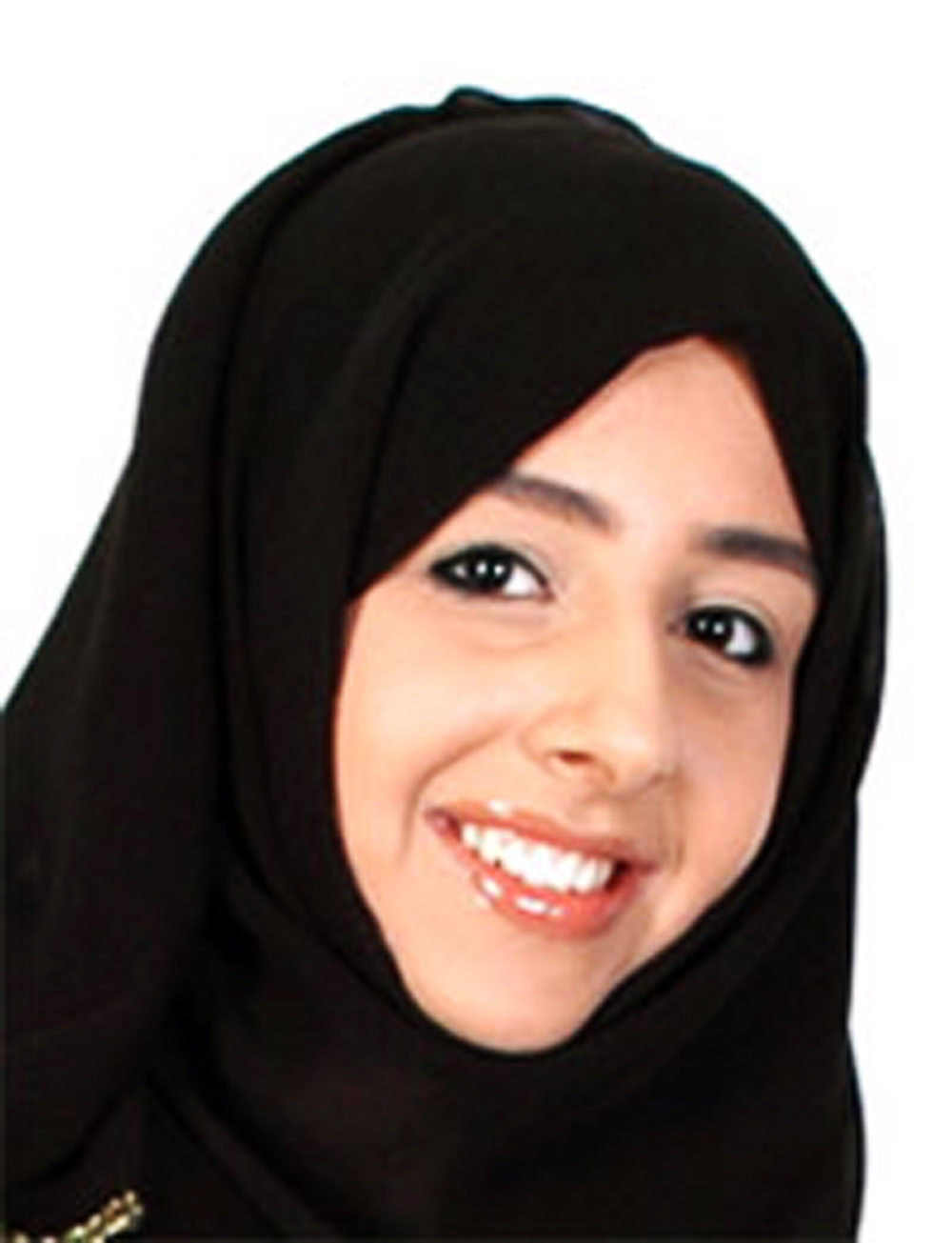
- Born: 1988 (age 37–38); Dubai, United Arab Emirates
- Education: Zayed University
- Style: Surrealism
- Website: www.maisoonalsaleh.com

Maisoon Al Saleh is an Emirati visual artist based out of Dubai. Her artistic style is surrealism with commentary on modern and traditional Emirati culture. Her paintings often feature the skeletons of humans and animals.

== Early life and education ==
Al Saleh was born in 1988 in Dubai where her family lived in a home they built off of Sheikh Zayed Road. At the age of 8, she began painting with oil paints on canvas with the help of her aunt, who was also an artist. She received a degree in interior design from Zayed University in January 2010.

She began painting images of bones and skeletons around the age of 16 after she had an X-ray taken on her back during a medical check-up. Al Saleh uses various mediums which include acrylic on canvas, mixed media for installations, and fiberglass and mixed media for her sculptures.

== Career ==
Al Saleh began her career as an artist in 2008. In 2009, she contributed her work to Emirati Expressions: Art from the Heart of the Emirates at Emirates Palace's Gallery One. Her first solo exhibition was held in summer 2010 in the Maraya Art Centre in Sharjah. Her second solo art exhibition was titled The Bright Side of the Bones and was held at the Dubai Community Theatre and Arts Centre's Gallery of Light in 2011. That same year Time Out Dubai included Al Saleh in a list of "Top 10 artists in Dubai."

Outside of the UAE, Al Saleh's work has been displayed in the Macedonian Museum of Contemporary Art, the Palazzo del Te, the Centro Cultural Caja Granada in Spain and several shows in the United States. In 2016, Al Saleh's art, with symbols of skulls and bones, was included in a group exhibition of Emirati artists in Kreuzberg, Berlin, entitled Art Nomads - Made in the Emirates.

=== Selected works ===
One of Al Saleh's first sales was a diptych titled The Couple that sold to the Barjeel Art Foundation in Sharjah. The Couple depicts a male and a female skeleton dressed in traditional wedding attire and were based on a real couple who died.

Her painting On a Diet features a female skeleton sitting down for a meal. It is a commentary on dieting, eating disorders and how the desire to lose weight effects young women in the UAE. Mummy and I depicts a mother, covered in black abaya and scarf while clutching her infant. The painting is based on stories of mothers when the UAE gained independence in 1971.

In 2010, she participated in a custom toys exhibition at the Dubai International Financial Centre as one of 100 artists who added individual touches to a 20 cm-high white figurine. Her addition was a skeleton wearing a ghutra and headphones which portrayed the traditional yowlah dance.

In 2011, The Dubai Culture & Arts Authority commissioned Al Saleh to contribute a mixed-media installation to the Sikka Art Fair.

Al Saleh was one of 21 artists to contribute to the Maritime UAE exhibition presented in conjunction with the 2012 National Day celebrations. The exhibit paid tribute to the maritime influence on Emirate culture and Al Saleh's contribution featured fish skeletons.

In November 2014, Al Saleh contributed to Promesse, an exhibition where 16 artists were asked to interpret Baume et Mercier timepieces. The same year, her painting Money Doesnt Float from her exhibit The Dara Chronicles was auctioned at Bonhams in London.

=== The Dara Chronicles ===
In 2013, Al Saleh presented her third solo show, The Dara Chronicles, at The Ara Gallery in downtown Dubai. The exhibit contained digital paintings and mixed-media prints that used X-rays and vintage suitcases. The exhibit was inspired by the stories she heard from her grandfather about the MV Dara explosion of 1961. Her grandfather was a survivor of the incident.

The beginning of the exhibit included a brief video with footage she shot while diving at the MV Dara site. In preparation for the exhibit, Al Saleh participated in an exploratory dive at the Dara grave site where she sketched portraits while scuba diving by using treated water-resistant canvases and a special crayon to make initial marks.

Her research also included reading letters written by the boat company and police investigators, as well as news articles and stories told by survivors. Much of the original coverage of the event was based on the British media, and The Dara Chronicles provided insight on the hidden stories of people who survived the MV Dara explosion.
