= Fāṭimah al-Baqqālī =

Emirati calligrapher, decorator, and visual artist

- فاطمة البقالي
- Born: 1 January 1974; Dubai, United Arab Emirates
- Died: 27 March 2024 (aged 50)
- Occupation(s): calligrapher, decorator, and visual artist
- Organization: Emirates Fine Arts Society
- Awards: Al Owais Award, Emirati Women’s Award for Arts and Literature

Signature
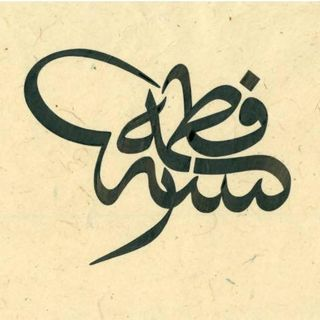

Fāṭimah Saeed al-Baqqālī (Arabic: فاطمة البقالي) (1 January 1974 – 27 March 2024) was an Emirati calligrapher, decorator, and visual artist. She was the first Emirati Gulf woman certified in the Naskh, Thuluth Diwani and Diwani Jali scripts from Turkey.

== Biography ==
al-Baqqālī was born in 1974 in Dubai.

al-Baqqālī graduated from the Arabic Calligraphy and Islamic Arts Institute in 1998. She was the first Emirati Gulf woman certified in the Naskh, Thuluth, Diwani, and Diwani Jali scripts from Turkey. She was also a member of the Emirates Fine Arts Society.

She was awarded the Al Owais Award and the Emirati Women’s Award for Arts and Literature.

She died in 2024.
