= Manal bint Mohammed Al Maktoum =

Emirati politician

- Sheikha
- Born: 12 November 1977 (age 49); Dubai, United Arab Emirates
- Spouse: Mansour bin Zayed Al Nahyan (m. 2005)
- Issue: Fatima; Mohammed; Hamdan; Latifa; Rashid
Names
- Sheikha Manal bint Mohammed bin Rashid bin Saeed bin Maktoum bin Hasher bin Maktoum bin Butti bin Suhail Al Maktoum
- House: Al Maktoum
- Father: Mohammed bin Rashid Al Maktoum
- Mother: Randa bint Mohammed Al-Banna

Sheikha Manal bint Mohammed bin Rashid Al Maktoum (Arabic: منال بنت محمد بن راشد آل مكتوم; born 12 November 1977) is an Emirati politician and member of the ruling family of Dubai. She is the eldest child of Mohammed bin Rashid Al Maktoum, the ruler of Dubai, and is the second wife of Mansour bin Zayed Al Nahyan, the younger brother of the president of the United Arab Emirates and the ruler of Abu Dhabi, Mohamed bin Zayed Al Nahyan.

== Personal life and education ==
Sheikha Manal is the eldest child of Sheikh Mohammed bin Rashid Al Maktoum, current Ruler of Dubai, and his former Lebanese wife Sheikha Randa bint Mohammed Al-Banna. She is the half sister of Crown Prince Hamdan. Sheikha Manal graduated with a bachelor's degree in Interior Design and a master's degree in marketing from the American University of Dubai.

She married Sheikh Mansour bin Zayed Al Nahyan of Abu Dhabi on 2 May 2005. They have five children:

- Fatima bint Mansour Al Nahyan (born 9 June 2006)
- Mohammed bin Mansour Al Nahyan (born 4 December 2007)
- Hamdan bin Mansour Al Nahyan (born 21 June 2011)
- Latifa bint Mansour Al Nahyan (born 23 January 2014)
- Rashid bin Mansour Al Nahyan (born 22 March 2017).

== Activities ==
In 2003, Sheikha Manal founded the Dubai Ladies Club. In November 2006, Sheikha Manal initiated Dubai Women Establishment (DWE). In 2012, Sheikha Manal launched the "Women on Boards" initiative.

Young Artist Award was founded under the patronage of Sheikha Manal in 2006 as a competition of fine arts of emerging artists in the United Arab Emirates.

As of 2025, Sheikha Manal is President of the UAE Gender Balance Council, announcing the announced the Gender Balance Council Pledge Awards in May 2025.
