= Tamara Al-Gabbani =

Emirati fashion designer

Tamaraah Al-Gabaani (Arabic: تمارة القباني) is a Saudi fashion designer, television personality and model.

== Biography ==
Tamaraah Al-Gabaani grew up in Dubai and attended school in London.

Al-Gabbani was the face of DKNY and Dolce & Gabbana for their modest collections. She was featured in Magrabi's summer 2018 fashion campaign celebrating female empowerment in the Middle East.

Al-Gabbani began her career as a television presenter for a broadcasting station in Dubai, which lead to her role as the host of Dubai International Film Festival's television show, which focused on coverage of film festivals throughout the United Arab Emirates. She founded the fashion brands House of Glamo and Tamara Al Gabbani in 2011. Her main collections are of evening gowns, jalabiyas, and abayas. Her collection was launched at Burj Khalifa and is sold at Village Mall and The Dubai Mall. She was awarded Best Dressed at Cannes Film Festival in her own designs, the first time for an Arab woman. She is also a brand ambassador for Jaipur Gems. In February 2018, she debuted a collection at the Best of Global Modest Fashion show during London Modest Fashion Week.
