= Shahenda =

1971 novel

- Author: Rashid Abdullah Al Nuaimi
- Language: Arabic
- Publication date: 1971
- Publication place: United Arab Emirates

Shahenda is the first Emirati novel by the Emirati writer Rashid Abdullah Al Nuaimi.

== Story ==
The novel discusses the story about a very beautiful girl called Shahenda which everyone desires. However, she and her parents were kidnapped by slavers and get sold and from here Shahenda story begins, and everyone tries to get her. The novel is inspired from real life in detailed about slave trade and women in United Arab Emirates. Through showing the life of a slave girl called Shahenda that was kidnapped by merchants from her country and got sold in Emirates. Shahenda is a fully feminine 17-year-old girl who visited one of the cities on the country in search of livelihood and got caught by a slaver who gave himself the right to be her owner and sold her to humans. After a period, when she becomes older enough to take revenge from those who enslaved her. As she became known by (Home wrecker) just to take revenge on a society that she sees as a victim of him because he freed her before him.

== Heritage ==
The Department of Culture in Ajman revived on Shahenda's novel. However, it focused on the place in Gulf novel as it was represented in organizing a conference bearing the name of the novel (First session) on 06–12–2009, Ajman.
