= Farah Al Qasimi =

Photographer from the UAE

Farah Al Qasimi (born 1991) is a photographer from the United Arab Emirates and Lebanon, living in Brooklyn, New York.

== Life and work ==
Al Qasimi earned a BA from Yale University. In 2012 she moved to Abu Dhabi and worked as an administrator for New York University Abu Dhabi before returning to Yale for her MFA.

Beginning on January 29, 2020, "Back and Forth Disco," her series of seventeen photographs, were installed on one hundred bus shelters throughout New York City as part of a project for the Public Art Fund. Her work was on display at the List Visual Arts Center at the Massachusetts Institute of Technology from July 30 to October 20, 2019.

She teaches at Pratt, NYU and the Rhode Island School of Design.

In 2018 she was awarded the Artadia Prize by the New York New Art Dealers Alliance. She was included in the Forbes list of 30 Under 30 - Art & Style 2020.

She is a classically trained pianist, and writes music for her own films.

== Exhibitions ==
- Artist Rooms: Farah Al Qasimi, Jameel Art Center, Dubai (2019)
- Back and Forth Disco, Public Art Fund (various locations around New York City) (2019)
- Brotherville, Wayne State University Undergraduate Library, Detroit (2020)
- Farah Al Qasimi: Star Machine, The Art Gallery of Western Australia, Perth (2023)
- Farah Al Qasimi, C/O Berlin, Germany (2023)

== Publications ==
- Hello, Future (Capricious, 2021)
