= Wafa bint Hasher Al Maktoum =

Emirati artist

- Sheikha
Names
- Sheikha Wafa bint Hasher bin Maktoum bin Juma bin Maktoum bin Hasher bin Maktoum bin Butti bin Suhail Al Maktoum
- House: Al Maktoum
- Father: Hasher bin Maktoum Al Maktoum
- Religion: Islam

Sheikha Wafa bint Hasher Al Maktoum (Arabic: الشيخة وفاء حشر آل مكتوم) is an Emirati artist and curator, member of Dubai's ruling family and founder of FN Design; a multi-functional space for art & design events in Al Quoz, UAE. She is a second cousin once removed of Mohammed bin Rashid Al Maktoum, Vice President and Prime Minister of the United Arab Emirates, Ruler of Dubai.

== Exhibitions ==
- 2015 FISTICUFFS, Alserkal Avenue, Dubai, United Arab Emirates (Curator)
- 2015 BEAUTOPSY, Alserkal Avenue, Dubai, United Arab Emirates (Curator)
- 2014 SIKKA Art Fair, Al Fahidi m Dubai, United Arab Emirates (Co-curator).
- 2014 FAKiE#3, Dubai, United Arab Emirates (artist & curator)
- 2009 Sketch, Alserkal Avenue, Dubai, United Arab Emirates (Founder).

== Patronage ==
Year	Organization	Title	In Association with
2014	Award for Excellency	Patron	Hospitality Management Holdings
2014	Design Days Dubai	Patron	
2013	Middle East Film & Comic Con	Patron	
2013	2nd The International Emerging Artist Award (IEAA)	Patron	Dubai Culture and Arts Authority (DCAA)
2013	Design Days Dubai	Patron	
2012	Design Days Dubai	Patron	

== See also ==
- SIKKA Art Fair
