= Mohamed Ahmed Ibrahim =

Emirati artist

Mohammed Ahmed Ibrahim (born 1962) is an Emirati artist from Khor Fakkan and one of the pioneer "five" conceptual artists from the United Arab Emirates including Hassan Sharif, Abdullah Al Saadi, Hussain Sharif and Mohammed Kazem.

== Exhibitions ==
- 2019-2020 Desert X AlUla (group exhibition)
- 2015 The Unbearable Lightness of Being, YAY Gallery, Baku
- 2015 Solo exhibition "Turab", Cuadro Gallery, Dubai
- 2013/2014 Solo exhibition "Primordial", Cuadro Gallery, Dubai
- 2009 Venice Biennale, Italy
- 2005 the Kunst Museum, Bonn, Germany
- 2002 Ludwig Forum, Germany
- 2000 the Havana Biennial, Cuba
- 1998 the Cairo Biennial, Egypt
- 1998 the Institut du Monde Arabe, Paris, France (Collective exhibition)
- 1996 the Sharjah Art Museum, Sharjah, United Arab Emirates
- 1995 Sittard Art Center, Netherlands
- 1993 Dhaka Biennial, Dhaka, Bangladesh
- (1993 - 2007) Sharjah Biennial, Sharjah, United Arab Emirates
- 1990 Emirates Fine Art Society exhibition in Moscow

== Awards ==
- 1999 First Prize for Sculpture, Sharjah Biennial, United Arab Emirates.
- 2001 First Prize for Sculpture, Sharjah Biennial, United Arab Emirates.

== See also ==
List of Emirati visual Artist
