= Mohammed Kazem =

Emirati artist (born 1969)

Mohammed Kazem (born 1969) is a contemporary Emirati artist working in Dubai, United Arab Emirates. He works primarily with video, sound art, photography, found objects and performance art.

Kazem is one of the five conceptual Emirati artists whose work was recognized as a group in the 2002 exhibition “5 UAE” at the Ludwig Museum, Aachen. The other artists in the group include the late Hassan Sharif, Hussain Sharif (brother of Hassan Sharif), Abdullah Al Saadi and Mohammed Ahmed Ibrahim.

== Early life and education ==
Kazem was born in 1969 and was the son of a taxicab driver.

At age 14, Kazem decided to drop out from school and join the army. He found art as a mean to escape his reality and express himself as a teenager, he started to investigate his surrounding environment as a keen artist to explore new methods of art.

== Career ==
In 1984, he was formally introduced to his future mentor and friend, Hassan Sharif, founder of Dubai Art Atelier; the first dedicated centre for young artists, and a pioneer of conceptual art scene in the early 70s in the United Arab Emirates.

In 1987, Kazem obtained a degree in painting from Emirates Fine Arts Society, and later joined the University of the Arts in Philadelphia where he got his Masters in Fine Arts in 2012.

Kazem is best recognized for his conceptual work Directions (2005-2013) and Autobiography (1997–present).

== Selected exhibitions ==
- 1997 Autobiography 1, UAE
- 2000 Havana Biennial – Havana, Cuba
- 2002 the Dhaka Biennial (2002), Dhaka, Bangladesh
- 2003 Art Cologne, n 37, cologne, Germany
- 2003 Sharjah Biennial 6, Sharjah, UAE
- 2006 Singapore Biennial, Singapore.
- 2013 Poetics and Meanings, Dubai, UAE
- 2013 UAE Pavilion, Venice Biennial, Italy
- 2013 Emirati Expressions, Saadiyat Island, Abu Dhabi, UAE
- 2015 Sharjah Biennial 12, Sharjah, UAE
- 2017 Abu Dhabi Rolls-Royce Art Programme

== Collections ==
Kazem's work is housed in private and public collections including:

- Mathaf: Arab Museum of Modern Art in Doha, Qatar.
- the Sharjah Art Museum, Sharjah, UAE.
- Barjeel Art Foundation, Sharjah, UAE.
- Sittard Art Center, Netherlands.
- JP Morgan Chase Collection, USA.
- Deutsche Bank Collection, Germany.

== See also ==
- Hassan Sharif
- Emirates Fine Arts Society
- Sharjah Biennial
- Category:Emirati contemporary artists
