= Abdul Qader Al Rais =

Emirati abstract painter

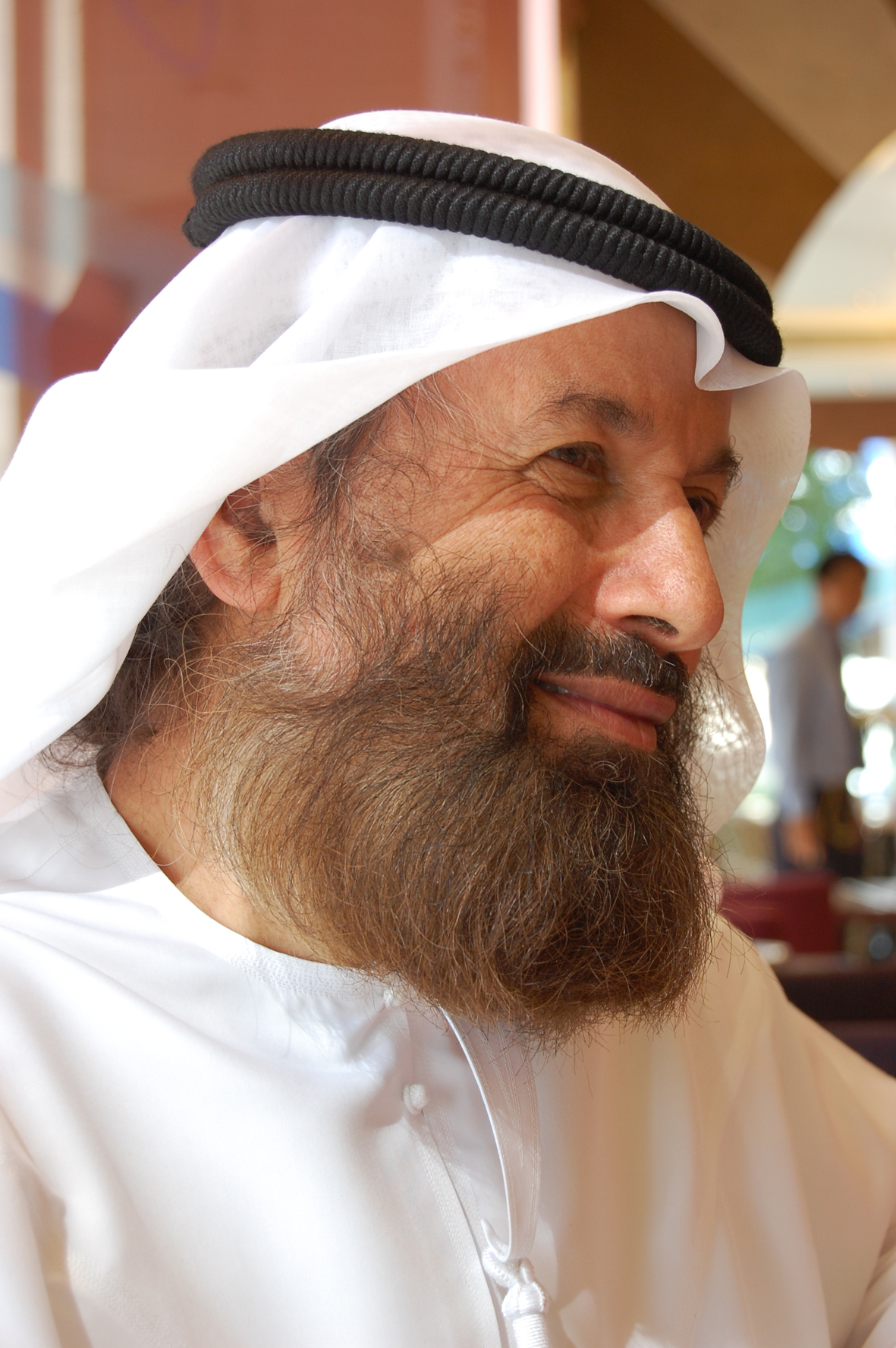
- Abdul Qader Al Rais in 2010
- Born: 1951 (age 74–75); United Arab Emirates
- Education: United Arab Emirates University, Al Ain
- Known for: Painter
- Movement: Hurufiyya movement

Abdul Qader Al Rais (Arabic: عبد القادر الريس) is an Emirati painter noted for his abstract art which combines geometric shapes with Arabic calligraphy. He is known for including calligraphy and abstracted objects in his paintings, and regarded as a colour master.

Al Rais, who was inspired by the Dutch Masters and Impressionists in his earlier work, created a distinctive style that is influenced by the different elements of nature and culture in the region. These elements frequently feature in his works.

== Early life ==
Al Rais was born in 1951 in Dubai in the United Arab Emirates. He became interested in painting, at the age of 14, following his father's death, when his mother sent him to Kuwait to live with his sister. He considered himself lucky because Kuwait was having a cultural renaissance at the time and he connected with other artists frequently at Al Marsam Al Hurr, the free studio, where they had access to books on art. Among such books were works on Leonardo da Vinci, Rembrandt, and other Renaissance luminaries that Al Rais regards as his first teachers. Additionally, the Kuwaiti government at the time supported art, so he had free access to all the supplies he needed. He showed an early talent, which he attributed as a "gift from God."

He remained with his sister in Kuwait until he was 18 yrs old by which time he had completed his basic education at the grammar school. Undoubtedly, Abdul Qader's early experiences in Kuwait, including the teachings impacted his development both artistically and intellectually.

Al Rais' unique style, that had yet to emerge, stems from his love for Impressionism which he learnt from Monet, Degas and Pissarro.

== Career ==
In 1968, Al Rais painted The Wait, an oil painting that depicts a boy standing behind two other boys who are sitting on the floor. Sheikha Hoor Al Qasimi chose The Wait as the oldest artwork to be displayed in the UAE's National Pavilion at the Venice Biennale.

On his return to the Emirates, in 1974, he worked at the Ministry of Labour as a labour inspector and pursued his further education by earning a degree in Sharia Law at the United Arab Emirates University, Al Ain. From 1974, he discontinued painting altogether and did not pick up a paint-brush for another 12 years. It was only after that, he concentrated on painting political themes such as the Gulf War and the First Palestinian Intifada.

Al Rais later returned to painting, although he stopped painting figures. He focused his attention instead on producing sweeping landscapes, architectural studies and abstract forms. As a young artist, he was awarded first honour for his artwork inspired by the movie, The Agony and the Ecstasy. This signaled the beginning of his career in art. Abdul Qader's incessant pencil and watercolour sketches clearly defined his role in life as an artist. These early works has led to continued success, as he received multiple awards, which garnered the attention of national and international media. Abdul Qader Al Rais became a household name in the GCC world of fine arts after he received the Palm Leaf award at the GCC exhibition. He also received the Sheikha Latifa Prize for Art and Literature.

As an artist, he is largely self-taught. His interest in old local architecture gems and nature were depicted in romantic realism. His early work explores local scenery, coastlines and idyllic landscape in the UAE. They were essentially realist but it is an extraordinary realism distilled by an exacting eye and a mystical imagination which gives his works much of its power. Not only does he capture the place, but also the sense of time, in a medium that is most expressive, appealing and challenging – watercolour. His later works, both in oil and watercolour, such as Serenity Series (2018), retain much of the original influences, but also include geometric elements and calligraphy, which may be familiar to the Middle Eastern eye, but seen as esoteric or enigmatic to Western audiences, as well as eliciting the peace of communicating with the divine.

He is a founding member of the Emirates Fine Art Society and is considered to be one of the pioneers of contemporary art in the Emirates, noted for his mainly abstract artwork which has been widely exhibited both within the UAE and abroad. Al Rais artwork can be found in Emirati palaces, government offices and in the personal art collections of members of the royal family of Dubai.

== Works ==
Al Rais is most noted for abstract works that incorporate geometric forms and Arabic script. The use of floating squares across the canvas has become a signature feature in his artworks.

He continued for the next several years to concentrate on local sceneries that became his trademark. Then, at the crucial juncture of his career, when he was moving beyond the traditional subjects in watercolour so indelibly associated with his name, Abdul Qader stepped outside himself and began to address issues of artistic authorship and individual style with acuity and critical distance.

Motifs of geometric ops producing multiple illusions of depth were initially added on to the subject. With this series, Abdul Qader succeeded in making the geometric forms surrounding the subject matter equally important as the subject matter itself. Moving further, changes in paint handling and stylistic staccato make for extreme variations among his realistic paintings resulting into calligraphic abstract juxtaposed with geometric ops and realistic images in vibrant new canvasses.

Al Rais' artwork was featured in the 2015 Venice Biennale and is held by the Museum of Contemporary Art in Shanghai, the National Gallery of Modern Art in New Delhi, and the British Museum.

In 2015, according to Sheikh Mohammed's campaign to beautify Dubai, Al Rais was one among five artists commissioned to decorate carriages of the Dubai Metro with their artwork, as part of the Dubai Arts Season to encourage public art in Dubai.

During 2016, Al Rais art pieces were included in a group exhibition in Berlin, entitled Art Nomads – Made in the Emirates which represented contemporary Emirati art and culture.

== Solo exhibitions ==
- 1974 – 1st Solo Exhibition – Dubai
- 1987 – Dubai, Sharjah
- 1988 – Dubai
- 1989 – Abu Dhabi
- 1990 – Dubai
- 1991 – Abu Dhabi, Dubai
- 1992 – Prague, Liberec, Czechoslovakia, Beirut
- 1993 – Washington DC
- 1994 – Al Ain, Dubai
- 1996 – Abu Dhabi, Germany, Dubai
- 1997 – Abu Dhabi, Dubai, Sharjah Biennial
- 2001 – Abu Dhabi, Kuwait, Dubai, Al Ain
- 2002 – Qatar
- 2003 – Dubai; 2004-Dubai
- 2005 – Dubai, Oman
- 2007 – Dubai, Abu Dhabi
- 2008 – Dubai, Riyadh

== Selected awards ==
- 1975 – First Prize, 1st Youth Exhibition-Dubai
- 1983 – Appreciation Certificate, Arab Painter's Exhibition-Kuwait
- 1988 – First Prize, 3rd Spring Exhibition-Abu Dhabi
- 1989 – Second Prize, 4th Spring Exhibition-Abu Dhabi
- 1990 – First Prize, 6th Emirates Exhibition-Abu Dhabi
- 1991 – First Prize, 1st Emirates Exhibition-Al Ain
- 1990, 1992, 1993 – Golden Dana Award-Kuwait
- 1993 – Juries Award, Sharjah Biennial-UAE
- 1992, 1994 & 1996 – First Prize Sultan Al Owais Award for Scientific Studies and Creativity-UAE
- 1995 – Juries Award Latakia Biennial-Syria
- 1997 – Honoured in Sharjah Biennial-UAE
- 1999 – First Prize Exhibition of “Emirates in the Eyes of its People”
- 1999 – Golden Soafah (palm Leaf), GCC Exhibition
- 2006 – Emirates Appreciation Award
- 2016 – First Prize Exhibition of “Emirates in the Eyes of its People”

== Selected bibliography ==
- The Human...The Home - Abdul Qader Al Rais, Catalogue Raisonne ©2005 Al Owais Cultural Foundation, Dubai
- The Colours of My Life – Abdul Qader Al Rais, Dubai Cultural Council, ISBN 978-1-86063-234-1, February 2008
- Abdul Qader Al Rais, Catalogue Raisonne ©2008, Hewar Art Gallery, Riyadh, Saudi Arabia
