= Ebtisam Abdulaziz =

Emirati artist, writer (born 1975)

Ebtisam Abdulaziz (born 1975) is a contemporary Emirati artist and writer born and raised in Sharjah, UAE. She works with geometry and mathematics to address issues of belonging and identity through installations, performance art and other media.

== Exhibitions ==
- 2014 NYU Abu Dhabi Art Gallery, Abu Dhabi, UAE
- 2014 View From Inside - Fotofest
- 2014 32nd Emirates Fine Arts Society Annual Exhibition, UAE
- 2013 Autobiography, The Third Line, Dubai, UAE
- 2013 Biennale, Houston, USA
- 2013 Emirati Expressions, Manarat Al Saadiyat, Abu Dhabi, UAE.
- 2013 The Beginning of Thinking is Geometric, Maraya Arts Centre, Sharjah, UAE
- 2013 Three Generations, Sotheby's, London UK.
- 2012 Arab Express, The Mori Art Museum, Tokyo, Japan
- 2012 25 years of Arab Creativity, L’institut du Monde Arabe, Paris, France
- 2012 Inventing The World: The Artists as a Citizen, Benin Biennial, Kora Centre, Benin
- 2009 UAE Pavilions at 53rd Venice Biennale
- 2007 Ebtisam Abdulaziz, Sharjah Contemporary Art Museum, Sharjah, UAE
- 2005 Sharjah Biennial, UAE

== Collection ==
Ebtisam's work is housed in several public and private collections including:

- Farook Collection
- Ministry of Culture, UAE
- Youth and Community Development, UAE
- Renault Collection, France
- Deutsche Bank AG, Germany

== See also ==
- Emirates Fine Arts Society
