= Najat Makki =

Emirati visual artist (born 1956)

- Born: 1956 (age 69–70); Bur Dubai
- Education: College of Fine Arts
- Known for: Contemporary Art

Najat Makki (born 1956) is an Emirati visual artist. She is a member of the Dubai Cultural Council. and one of the pioneers in Emirati contemporary art scene.

== Education ==
Makki was the first Emirati woman to earn a government scholarship to study art abroad in 1977. She obtained her bachelor's and master's degrees in relief sculpture and metal from the College of Fine Arts in Cairo, where she also received her doctorate in the philosophy of art in 2001.

== Influences ==
Najat Makki was influenced by pioneer Egyptian artists such as Mokhtar, Mohamed Saeed, Hamed Nada, Brothers Wanly, Alsajini and Saed Alsader. Najat's creativity also inspired by the local Emirates environment such as the desert, the sea and folklore. Her perception has a large impact on the artistic interpretations she has developed over time. Her work covers a variety of styles including realism and abstract expressionism.

“Everything has colour to me. When I was a child, my father owned an herbal medicine shop. It was full of boxes of all different herbs as well as indigo dye and alum-block. I used them all to paint on paper bags. That’s when I started to love colour. At home, I watched my sisters make cushions and curtains from brightly coloured material. I learned about light and shadow from watching my mother fold our clothes. My relationship with colour didn’t just come; I worked on it by learning from everything I saw.”

== Selected exhibitions ==
- 2000 Woman & Arts; International View Exhibition- Sharjah
- 2002 Emirates Media Inc. Exhibition; For you Jerusalem- Abu Dubai
- 2002 Tehran Biennial- Iran
- 2003 Sharjah Antiquities Museum- Sharjah, UAE
- 2004 Environment Exhibition at Dubai Trade Center- Dubai, UAE
- 2004 Immar International Arts Workshop- Dubai, UAE
- 2004 Co- Exhibition with a Colleague Artist in the Occasion of UAE President Ascension Day held by Dubai International Airport- Dubai, UAE
- 2004 Book Fair Exhibition- Frankfurt- Germany
- 2004 Heritage Horizons Exhibition- Abu Dhabi Officers Club, UAE
- 2014 Women/Creators: Visionary Women in the Emirates Art Scene, Abu Dhabi, UAE
- 2015 the UAE national Pavilion, Venice Biennial, Italy
- 2016 Portrait of a Nation- Abu Dhabi, UAE

== Awards ==
- 1993 Jury Award, First Session of Sharjah International Biennial, UAE
- 1996 General Authority of Youth & Sports Welfare-Silver Award, UAE
- 1998 Gulf Cooperation Council Biennial Award
- 1999 Al Mahabaa Syrian International Biennial, Syria
- 2007 Emirates Appreciation Award for Arts, Science and Literature
- 2008 The National Award for Arts, Science and Literature
