= Hassan Sharif =

Emirati artist and writer (1951–2016)

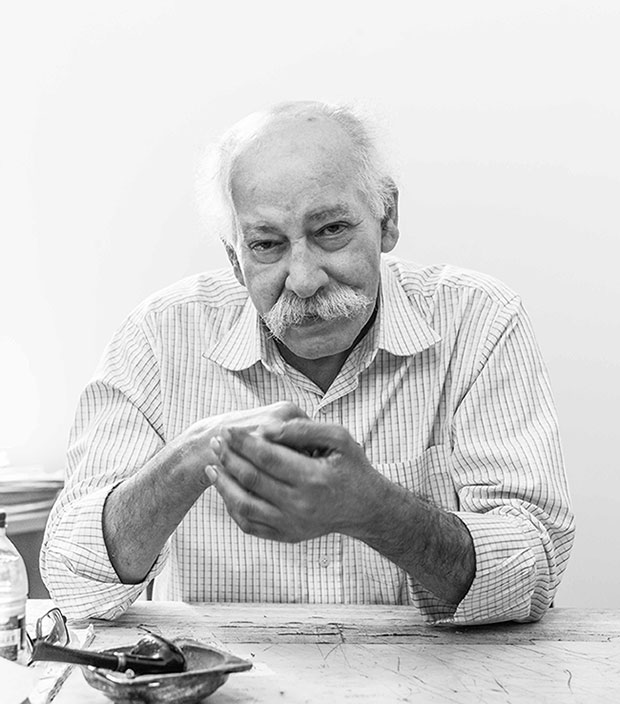
- Born: 1 January 1951
- Died: 18 September 2016 (aged 65); Dubai, United Arab Emirates
- Known for: Contemporary art, process art, conceptual art

Hassan Sharif (1 January 1951 – 18 September 2016) was an Emirati artist and prolific writer. He lived and worked in Dubai, United Arab Emirates. He is widely regarded as a central figure in contemporary and conceptual art in the region, often known as the father of conceptual art in the Gulf. He founded Al Marijah Art Atelier, and through his extensive work and writings, he inspired the next generation of artists in the United Arab Emirates. His work is represented in major public collections, such as the Guggenheim New York, Guggenheim Abu Dhabi, Centre Pompidou, Mathaf Arab Museum of Modern Art, Tate Modern, and Sharjah Art Foundation.

== Early work ==
Sharif's early 'caricatures' were printed in the UAE's nascent newspapers and magazines from 1973 to 1979, and reflected on the political climate of the Middle East in the 1970s as well as the UAE's rapid urbanisation and commercial globalisation since its formation. By the time Sharif left the UAE in 1979 to pursue a formal art education, he had actively rejected calligraphic abstraction and Arab Nationalism, both of which were the dominant discourse in the region at that time, as well as the 'negative irony' of his early cartoons. "I had had some experience from creating the Caricatures but when I went to Britain I wanted to clean that away; to forget or ignore what I had been doing before. [...] I just wanted to be around new ideas and whatever new was happening."

== Career ==
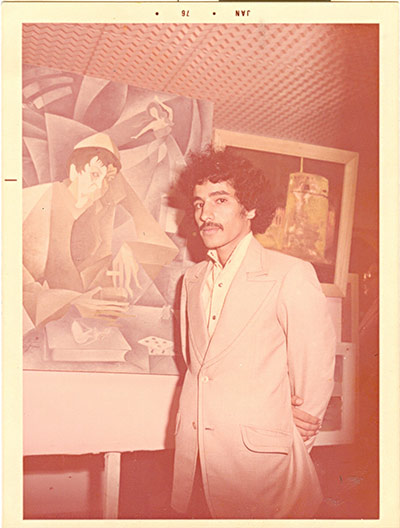
Hassan Sharif during his exhibition, 1976

After a foundation year studying in Leamington Spa, Sharif enrolled at the Byam Shaw School of Art (today part of Central Saint Martins) in 1980 and came under the influence of artist Tam Giles, head of the Abstract and Experimental Department. This led to an interest in British Constructionism and particularly Kenneth Martin's notion of 'chance and order', which Sharif developed into his own 'Semi-system' way of working – based around arbitrary or over-elaborate systems that are then followed to create works, often on a grid, from 'Body and Squares' (1983) to meticulously recording sentences read in a newspaper at points along a journey to Sharjah, to long sequences of black lines showing transformations of a line within a square. "I think of these markings as more of an engagement than an arrangement […] The important thing is the process."

Art as absurdist, process-based activity also fed Sharif's early performances enacted in London and on return trips to the UAE during summer holidays – jumping in the desert, tying rope between rocks, and discussing art in the toilets of Byam Shaw School of Art with a member of the faculty. "For instance, I speak while my mouth is full of bread. I take a sip of water. I eat more bread, speak, drink some more water, and so on, recording all the sounds. All the while I'm talking about serious things like politics and art, but it's an ironic delivery, imitating politicians and lecturers."

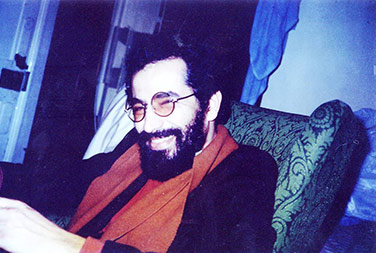
Sharif in London, 1983

Sharif graduated in 1984 and set about staging the first exhibitions of contemporary art in the Emirates. He founded Al Marijah Art Atelier in Sharjah in 1984, a meeting place for a generation of young artists in the country, and assembled several interventions around the city including One Day Exhibition (1985) and an impromptu exhibition in the city's central market. In this period, Sharif also penned numerous articles in the UAE's nascent press about the history of art and translated into Arabic excerpts of 20th-century art manifestos and texts (notably about Post-Impressionism, Cubism, Abstract Expressionism, Orphism, Futurism, Dada and Surrealism, Constructivism, Fluxus, Arte Povera, Minimalism and Conceptual Art) so as to provoke a local engagement and show that his work is grounded in a discourse. "I didn't only make art but I made my audience too. I had to contextualise what I was doing."

In addition to his own practice, Sharif founded the Art Atelier in the Youth Theater and Arts, Dubai. He supported several generations of artists in the Emirates, authored books, and wrote over fifty essays on art.

Sharif's works are held in notable institutional collections including M+, Hong Kong; Guggenheim New York; Guggenheim Abu Dhabi; Centre Pompidou, Paris; Mathaf Arab Museum of Modern Art, Doha; and the Sharjah Art Foundation. Sharif died on 18 September 2016 in Dubai. He was 65.

== The Flying House ==
In 2007, Abdulraheem Sharif—who has been documenting and storing the artworks of Hussein and Hassan Sharif, as well as other artists since early 90s—decided to turn his former house into a non-profit space to showcase the artworks he was warehousing, and the ones that were with the Emirati artists. Hassan Sharif encouraged his brother's idea, and by January 2008, the space was ready. Mohamed Kazem curated it, and Jose Clevers gave it the name, The Flying House. Hassan lived in The Flying House from 2008 to 2013, where he also set up his studio there during that period. The Flying House space closed down in 2013.

== 'Weaving' ==
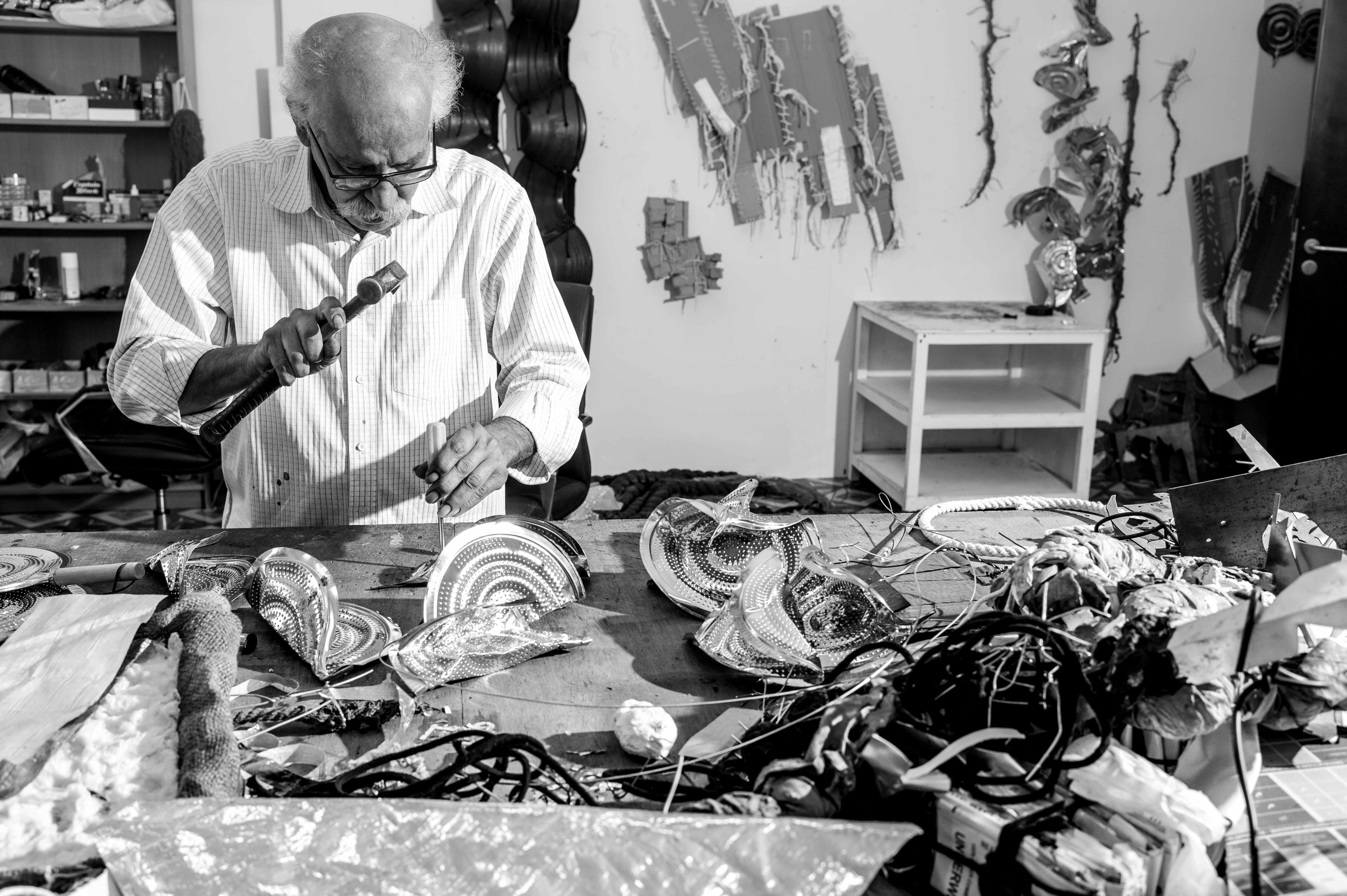
Sharif in his studio

From the early '80s, Sharif began creating assemblages from cheap, mass-produced materials or items sourced from the UAE's markets. With these heaps – often large in scale – Sharif was handing back as artwork the surplus of a recently and rapidly-industrialised UAE. Similarly, "as illustrations of meaningless [sic], taking Duchampian philosophy to heart, they were crafted from commonplace materials, cut, bound or tied together with rope or wire, and thus stripped of their original function." His subsequent assemblages have incorporated coir, rope, copper wire, readymade domestic products, a crutch, newspapers dipped in glue and papier-mache.

The process of bundling these objects together – 'weaving', as Sharif calls it – has had extraordinary influence on his broader practice, both in the repetitive gesture of tying to the rudimentary handmade nature of the process. "It's important for me that art is easy, and technically anyone can do it. In that sense, my work is skill-less. I mean, you don't need special skills to make work that becomes art. I don't want the sculptures to appear to result from virtuosity. I'm not trying to make magic of some kind that would impress an audience as to how the work is created. There are no secrets."

In 2006, Sharif released an essay titled 'Weaving', which detailed the ideas that first initiated these objects, responding to what he calls a "vulgar market mentality that flooded shops with consumer goods".

"Despite the fact that my works are based on a sequential, industrial mode of creativity, they also demolish the sequential autonomy of an industrial product. I inject my works with a realism that exposes this socio-political economic monster, allowing people a chance to recognise the danger of over indulgence in this form of negative consumption."

Sharif continued to create objects throughout his career, but challenged the form throughout, at various times incorporating paintings, works on paper into the assemblage and using the form to create more figurative works. In 2014, Sharif began working with mass-produced images – bundling together printouts, glossy magazines and pages from books, as well as illustrations from a dictionary recreated at an exaggerated scale in iron and 'woven' together as assemblage.

== Exhibitions ==
Sharif's first public exhibition was at Dubai's Central Public Library in 1976, showing his early 'Caricature' cartoons. Subsequently he participated in group shows at, amongst other venues, Whitechapel Gallery, London, New Museum, New York, and Centre Pompidou, Paris. A monograph of his career, Hassan Sharif Experiments & Objects 1979-2011, was curated by Catherine David and Mohammed Kazem at Qasr Al Hosn, Abu Dhabi, in 2011. Sharif exhibited in the Giardini della Biennale (Venice) at the 57th Venice Biennale, VIVA ARTE VIVA, Italy (2017), curated by Christine Macel. The first Emirati to show in the Mathaf Arab Museum of Modern Art, Doha (2010). He also exhibited in the UAE's national pavilion at the Venice Biennale on two occasions, the first being the pavilion's debut in 2009 (curated by Tirdad Zolghadr) and the second in 2015, this time curated by Sheikha Hoor Al-Qasimi.

== Solo exhibitions ==
2021 Hassan Sharif: I Am The Single Work Artist, MAMC+, Saint-Étienne Métropole, France
2020 Hassan Sharif: I Am The Single Work Artist, Malmö Konsthall, Malmö, Sweden
2020 Hassan Sharif, From Daily Experiences To Collective Stories, gb agency Gallery
2019, Blue, IVDE Gallery
2019 Hassan Sharif: I Am The Single Work Artist, KW Institute for Contemporary Art, Berlin, Germany
2018 Hassan Sharif, Alexander Gray Associates, New York, U.S.A
2017 Hassan Sharif: I Am The Single Work Artist, Sharjah Art Foundation, Curated by Shiekha Hoor Al Qasimi, Sharjah, U.A.E
2017 Hassan Sharif, gb Agency, Paris, France
2017 Experimentations, Gallery Isabelle van den Eynde, La Patinoire Royale, Brussels, Belgium
2016 Hassan Sharif, Alexander Gray Associates, New York, U.S.A
2016 Hassan Sharif: Objects and Files, Mathaf: Arab Museum of Modern Art, Doha, Qatar
2015 Images, Gallery Isabelle van den Eynde, Dubai
2015 Hassan Sharif: The Physical Is Universal, gbAgency, Paris, France
2014 Hassan Sharif, Alexander Gray Associates, New York, U.S.A
2013 Approaching Entropy, Gallery Isabelle Van Den Eydne, Dubai
2012 Hassan Sharif, Level One, Paris
2012 Hassan Sharif Works 1980-2012, Sfeir-Semler Gallery, Beirut
2012 Hassan Sharif, Alexander Gray Associates, New York
2011 Hassan Sharif Experiments & Objects 1979-2011, Qasr Al Hosn, Cultural Quarter Hall, Abu Dhabi
2009 Press Conference, 1x1 Contemporary, Dubai
1986 Emirates Fine Art Society, Sharjah
1985 Emirates Fine Art Society, Sharjah
1976 Caricature, Central Public Library, Dubai

== Selected group exhibitions ==
2021 Concept and The Divine Abstract, The Farjam Foundation
2020 Out of Place, IVDE Gallery
2019 Artists and the Cultural Foundation: The Early Years, Curated by Maya Allison and Alia Zaal Lootah, Cultural Foundation, Abu Dhabi
2018 The Monochrome Revisited, Jean-Paul Najar Foundation, Dubai
2018 Cashiers écrits, dessinés, inimprimés, Foundation Bordmer, Geneva
2018 The 9th Asia Pacific Triennial of Contemporary Art (APT9), Queensland Art Gallery/Gallery of Modern Art, Brisbane Crude, Jameel Arts Centre, Dubai
2018 Ways of Seeing, New York University Art Gallery, Abu Dhabi
2018 We Began By Measuring Distance, Museé d'art moderne et contemporain (mamco), Geneva
2018 A Century in Flux: Highlights from the Barjeel Art Foundation, Sharjah Art Museum, Sharjah
2017 The Restless Earth, Fondazione Nicola Trussardi, Milan
2017 Good Printing: Group Show, Gallery Isabelle van den Eynde, Dubai, U.A.E
2017 La Biennale di Venezia - 57th International Art Exhibition, Giardini, Venice, Italy
2017 La Triennale di Milano, Palazzo della Triennale, Milan, Italy
2017 The Creative Act: Performance - Process - Presence, Guggenheim Abu Dhabi, U.A.E
2017 But We Cannot See Them: Tracing a UAE Art Community 1988-2008, NYUAD, Abu Dhabi, U.A.E
2017 Is Old Gold?, DUCTAC, Dubai, U.A.E
2016 "Hassan Sharif: Objects and Files", Mathaf: Arab Museum of Modern Art, Doha, curated by Laura Barlow
2016 Yinchuan Biennale, Museum of Contemporary Art Yinchuan, Yinchuan, China
2016 Noah's Arch, Emirates Fine Art Society, Sharjah, U.A.E
2016 White Cube, Gallery Isabelle van den Eynde, Dubai, U.A.E
2016 Book of Asia, Asia Culture Center Theater, Gwangju, Korea
2016 Paper Stories, Level One, Paris, France
2015 Adventures of the Black Square: Abstraction in Art and Society 1915-2015, Whitechapel Gallery, London
2015 Sharjah Biennial: The past, the present, the possible, curated by Eungie Joo, Sharjah Art Foundation
2014 Here and Elsewhere, New Museum, New York
2012 18th Biennale of Sydney, Sydney
2012 Paper, Museé d'Art Moderne et d'Art Contemporain, Nice, France
2010 Interventions, Mathaf: Arab Museum of Modern Art, Doha, Qatar
2010 "Dropping lines" Salwa Zeidan Gallery Abu Dhabi, 27 Oct -10 Nov 2009 ADACH Platform for Visual Arts, La Biennale di Venezia, 53rd International Art Exhibition, Venice
2009 It's Not You, It's Me, UAE National Pavilion, La Biennale di Venezia, 53rd International Art Exhibition, Venice, curated by Catherine David.
2009 Across the Gulf, ARC Biennial
2009 Contemporary Emirati artists at Salwa Zeidan Gallery Abu Dhabi 11 Jan till 12 Feb 2003 Sharjah International Arts Biennial, Sharjah
2002 5 UAE, Ludwig Forum for International Art, Aachen, Germany
2001 Sharjah International Arts Biennial, Sharjah
2000 The 7th Havana Biennial, Havana
1995 Sharjah International Arts Biennial, Sharjah
1993 1st Sharjah International Art Biennial, Sharjah
1985 Central Market, Sharjah
1984 One Day Exhibition, Almarijah Art Atelier, Sharjah
1983 -/+ (minus/plus), Al Ahli Club, Dubai
