= Emirates Fine Arts Society =

Non-profit of art professionals

Emirates Fine Arts Society is a non-profit association of art professionals in the United Arab Emirates, established in 1980. The Head Office is located in Sharjah, and there are branches in Abu Dhabi, Ras Al Khaimah and Khor Fakkan.

== About ==
The Emirates Fine Arts Society is member of the Arab Art Association and the International Association of Art, IAA/AIAP (headquarters in Paris, France).

The mission of the Emirates Fine Arts Society is to support its members and to promote art education among the public by organizing exhibitions, including the annual exhibition at the Sharjah Art Museum.

== Members ==
- Fāṭimah al-Baqqālī

== See also ==
- Sharjah Biennial
- Sharjah Art Foundation
- Abu Dhabi Art
