= Jamuna =

Jamuna or Jumna may refer to:

== Geography ==
- Jamuna River (Bangladesh), one of three primary rivers in Bangladesh, a distributary of the Brahmaputra
- Small Jamuna River, Bangladesh
- Jamuna River (West Bengal), a river of India, tributary of the Ichimati in West Bengal
- Yamuna River, or Jamuna, a major river of India, tributary of the Ganges
- Jamuna, Nepal, a town in Nepal

== People ==
- Jamuna (actress) (1938–2023), Indian film actress, director, and politician
- Jamuna Barua (1919–2005), Assamese actress
- Jamuna Boro (born 1997), Indian boxer
- Jamuna Devi (1929–2010), Indian politician
- Jamuna Gurung (footballer)
- Jamuna Gurung (entrepreneur)
- Jamuna Nishad (1953–2010), Indian politician
- K. Jamuna Rani (born 1938), Indian playback singer

== Companies ==
- Jamuna Bank, a commercial bank in Bangladesh
- Jamuna Group, a Bangladeshi industrial conglomerate
  - Jamuna TV, a Bengali language television channel
- Jamuna Oil Company, a subsidiary of the Bangladesh Petroleum Corporation

== Other uses ==
- Jamuna State Guest House, official guest house of the Government of Bangladesh
- Jamuna Cantonment, a cantonment of the Bangladesh Army
- Jumna (ship), iron-hulled full-rigged ship
- BNS Jamuna, a Large Patrol Craft of the Bangladeshi Navy, in service since 1985
- HMS Jumna, ship of the Royal Indian Navy
- HMS Jumna (1848), Helena-class brig of the Royal Navy built at the Bombay Dockyard
- HMS Jumna (1866), Euphrates-class troopship
- INS Jamuna (U21), Black Swan-class sloop in the Indian Navy
- SS Jumna, steam passenger liner
- SS Jumna, steam passenger liner not to be confused with SS Jumna, earlier passenger liner used for immigration to Australia

== See also ==
- Yamuna (disambiguation)
- Jumana (disambiguation)
- Gunga Jumna, 1961 Indian film starring Dilip Kumar
- Yamuna in Hinduism
