= Tashkeel Dubai =

Art facility in Dubai

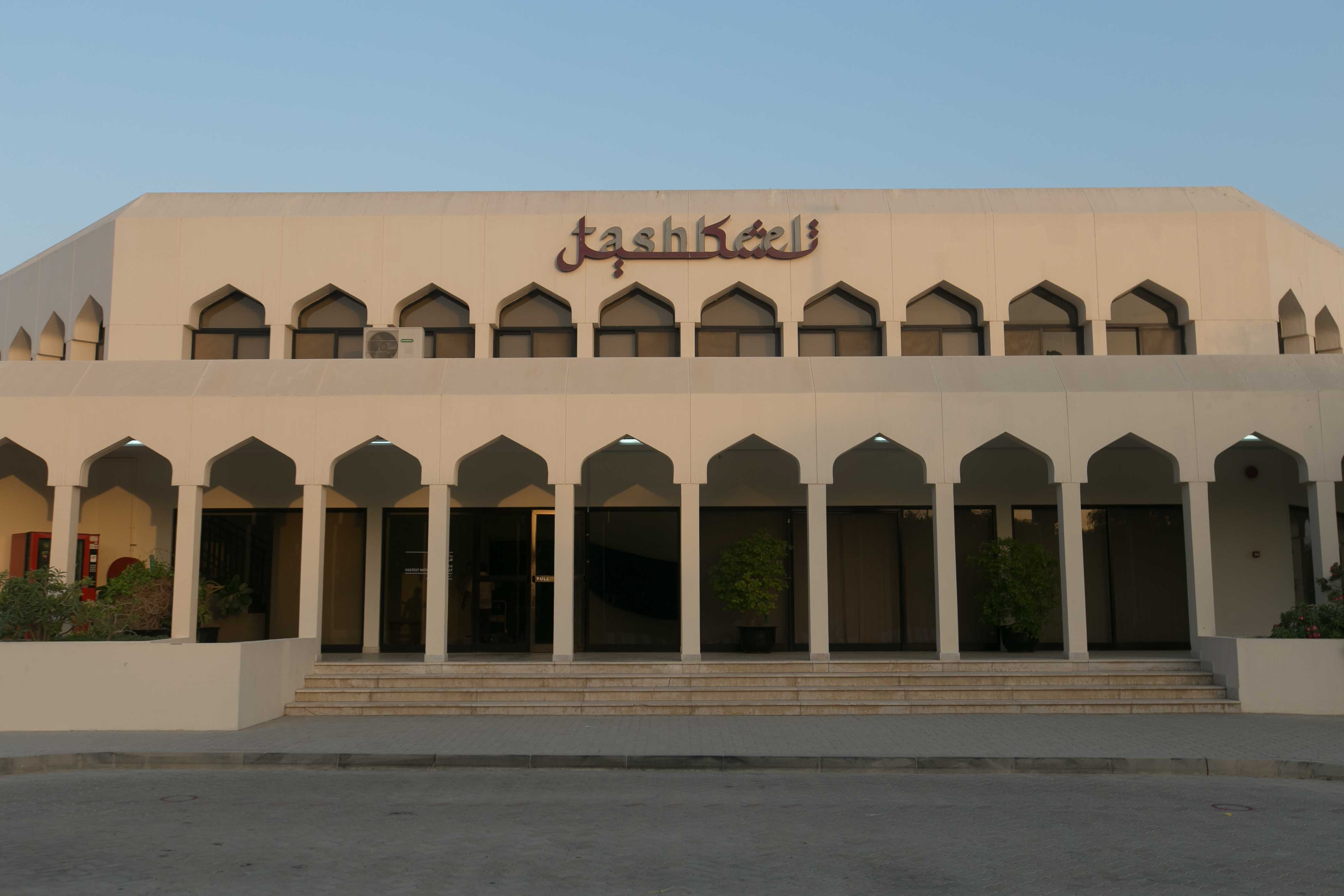
- Exterior of the Tashkeel building in Nad Al Sheba 1.
- Founder: Lateefa bint Maktoum Al Maktoum
- Established: 2008
- Location: Dubai, United Arab Emirates
- Coordinates: 25.15789°N 55.32320°E
- Interactive map of Tashkeel Dubai
- Website: https://tashkeel.org/about

Tashkeel is an art facility in the United Arab Emirates. Established in Dubai, United Arab Emirates in 2008 by Lateefa bint Maktoum.

Operating on an open membership model, Tashkeel's annual programme of training, residencies, workshops, talks, exhibitions, international collaborations and publications aims to further practitioner development, public engagement, lifelong learning and the creative and cultural industries.

== Facilities ==
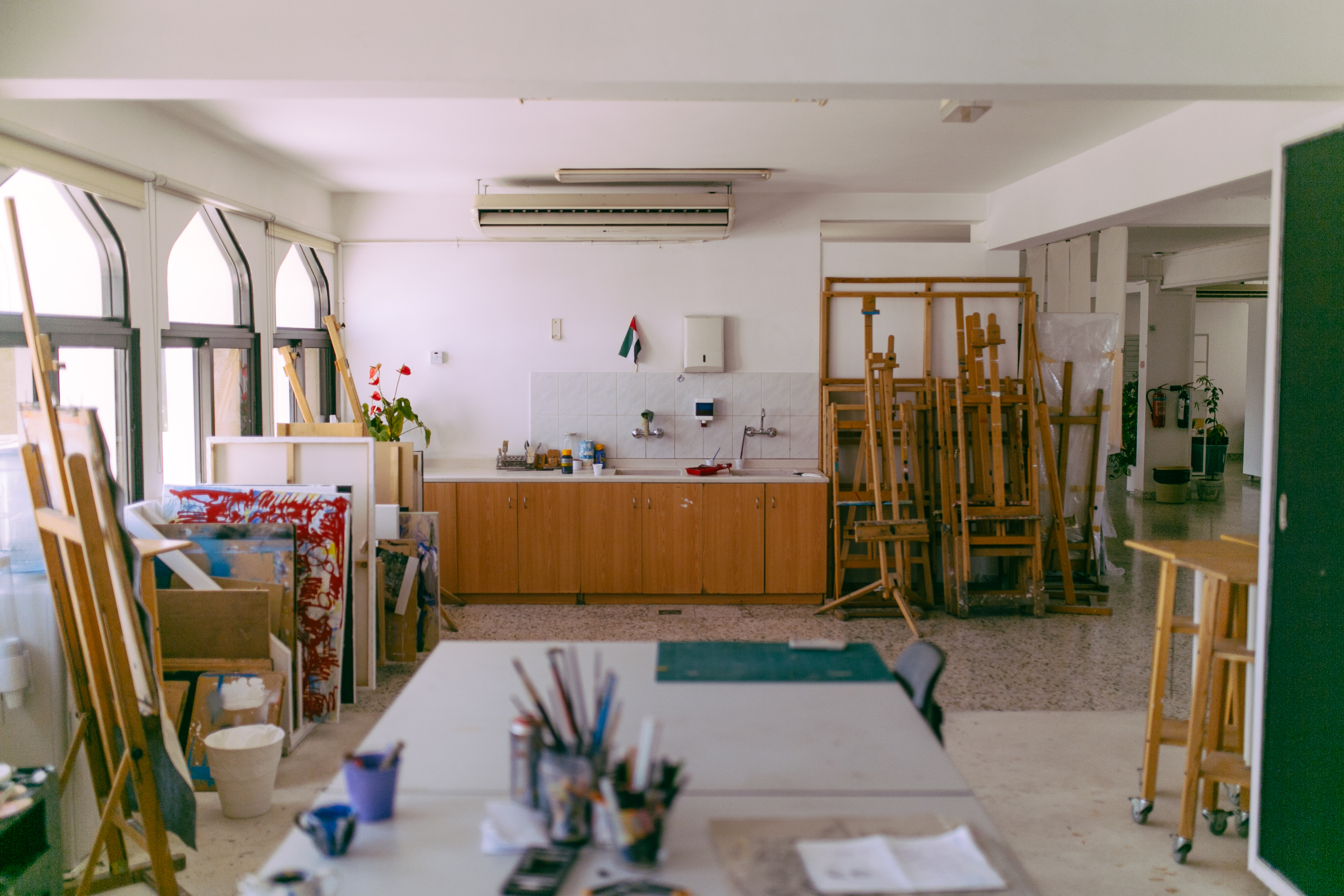
Communal painting studio in the Tashkeel building.

Tashkeel currently consists of a 2,800sq.m building (built in 1987) in the district of Nad Al Sheba, which includes a gallery, studios for the practice of specific artistic disciplines (fine art, digital, 3D, darkroom, photography, printmaking, textile printing); a library; lounge, garden and workspaces.

Tashkeel also has a traditional house in the historical neighborhood of Al Fahidi, which contains five individual artist studios and two gallery spaces.

== Exhibitions ==
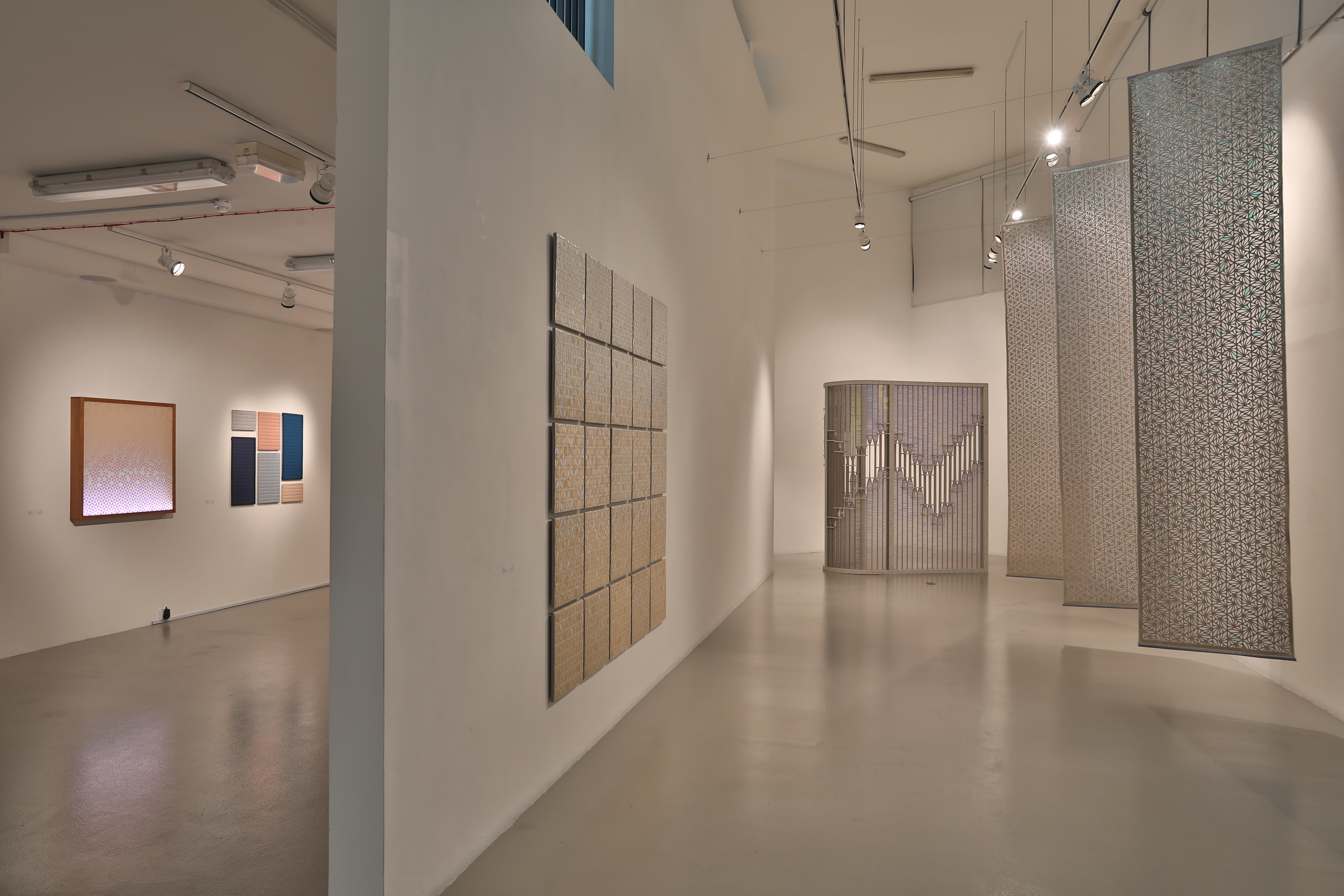
Gallery picture of Fay McCaul's works exhibited in In Residence (2017)

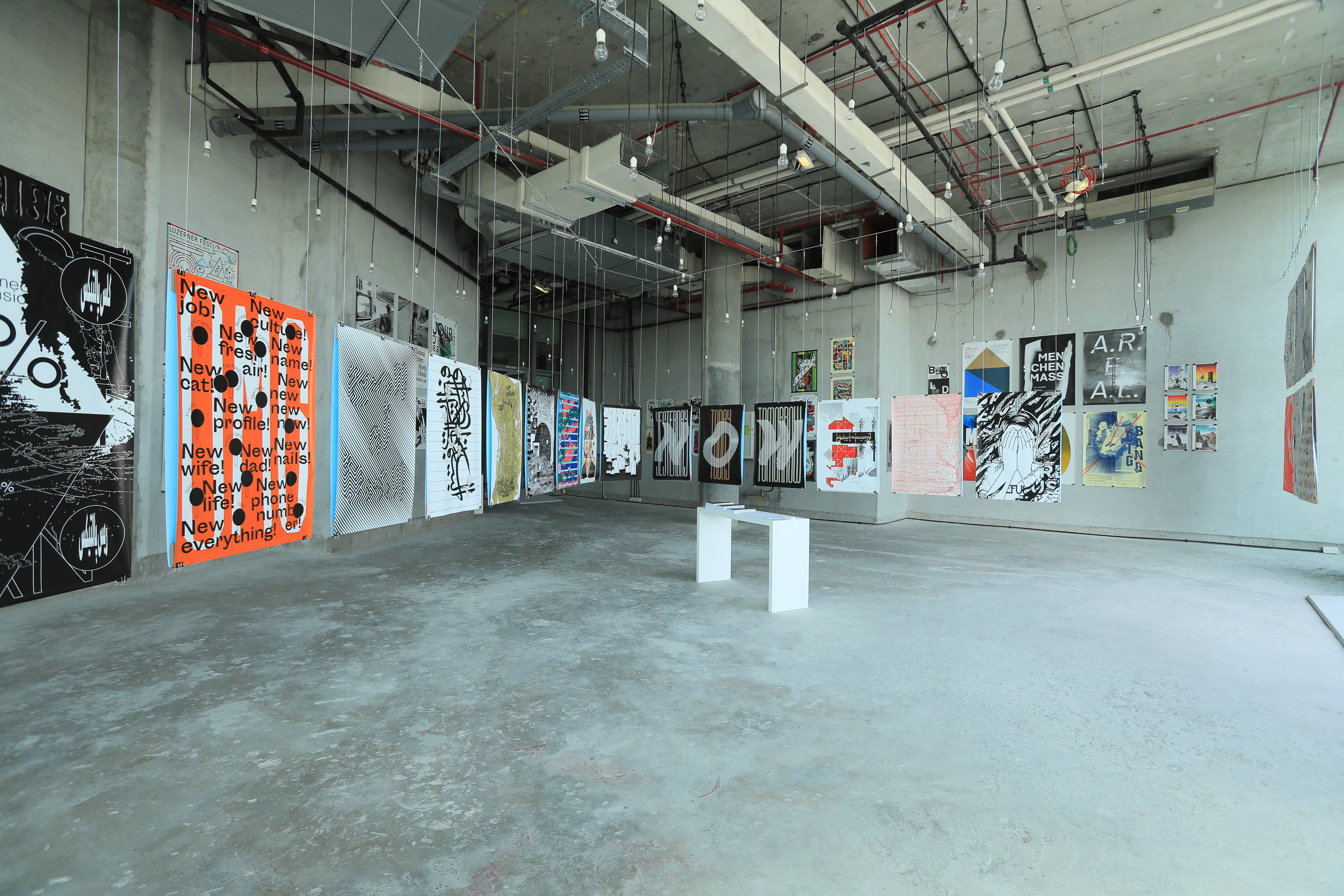
Weltformat DXB, a poster exhibition in collaboration with Weltformat, Engy Aly, Design House and Pro-Helvetia Cairo. Hosted at Dubai Design District (d3) during Dubai Design Week 2017.

Tashkeel annual exhibition programme includes two open calls, residency outcomes, culminating shows of its Critical Practice and Tanween training programmes as well as Made in Tashkeel (2009 – present), an annual art exhibition presenting selected works by members, workshop participants and recent exhibiting artists. Each year, Tashkeel also presents design exhibitions including the 'graduation' show of the Tanween design programme during Dubai Design Week.

Notable exhibitions
2008	Space-tacular & Fusion	outcome of international artist exchange programme curated by Sam Bardouil and Emanuela Nobile Mino featuring works by Eugenio Percossi, Ivan Civic, Marina Paris, Valentin Diego, Michael Bray, Sarah Lahti, Iman Al Sayed, Amira Mehrez
2009-2015	Made In Tashkeel	an annual art exhibition showcasing the works of Tashkeel members and recent exhibiting artists.
2010	Portrait of a Generation	featuring works by 56 different artists from 23 different countries, all residents of the United Arab Emirates.
2012	Emra'a	solo exhibition by Patricia Millns
2013	GA.BOS.IA	solo exhibition by 2012 artist-in-residence Amartey Golding
2013	The B Side	solo exhibition by 2013 artist-in-residence Ruben Sanchez
2014	Declaration	solo exhibition for 2014 artist-in-residence Tunisian-French calligraphy artist el Seed.
2015	Soundweaving	a collaboration with Hybridart, produced at Moholy Nagy Art University (MOME) in Hungary. Part of Dubai Design Week 2015.
2015	Monumental 11/11	solo exhibition by the calligraphy artist Wissam Shawkat
2017	New Chapter	solo exhibition by founder and director of Tashkeel Lateefa bint Maktoum
2017	Mind the Gap	a group exhibition of 28 artists curated by Jack Taylor
2017	Delusions and Errors	group exhibition of graphic design work from MENA designers. A collaboration between Tashkeel, Weltformat, Engy Aly and Design House, with the support of Pro-Helvetia.
2018	10 Years Later	a 2018 exhibition to celebrate a decade of Tashkeel, featuring 16 works commissioned by Tashkeel from artists and designers who have contributed through residencies, workshops, or previous exhibitions.
2019	The Alumni Return	a group exhibition with works by 8 prominent artists who completed their Master's degrees abroad and have returned to the UAE.
2020	Plastic	a group exhibition with 38 artists exhibiting works on theme of Plastic.

== Programmes ==
=== Tanween Design Programme ===
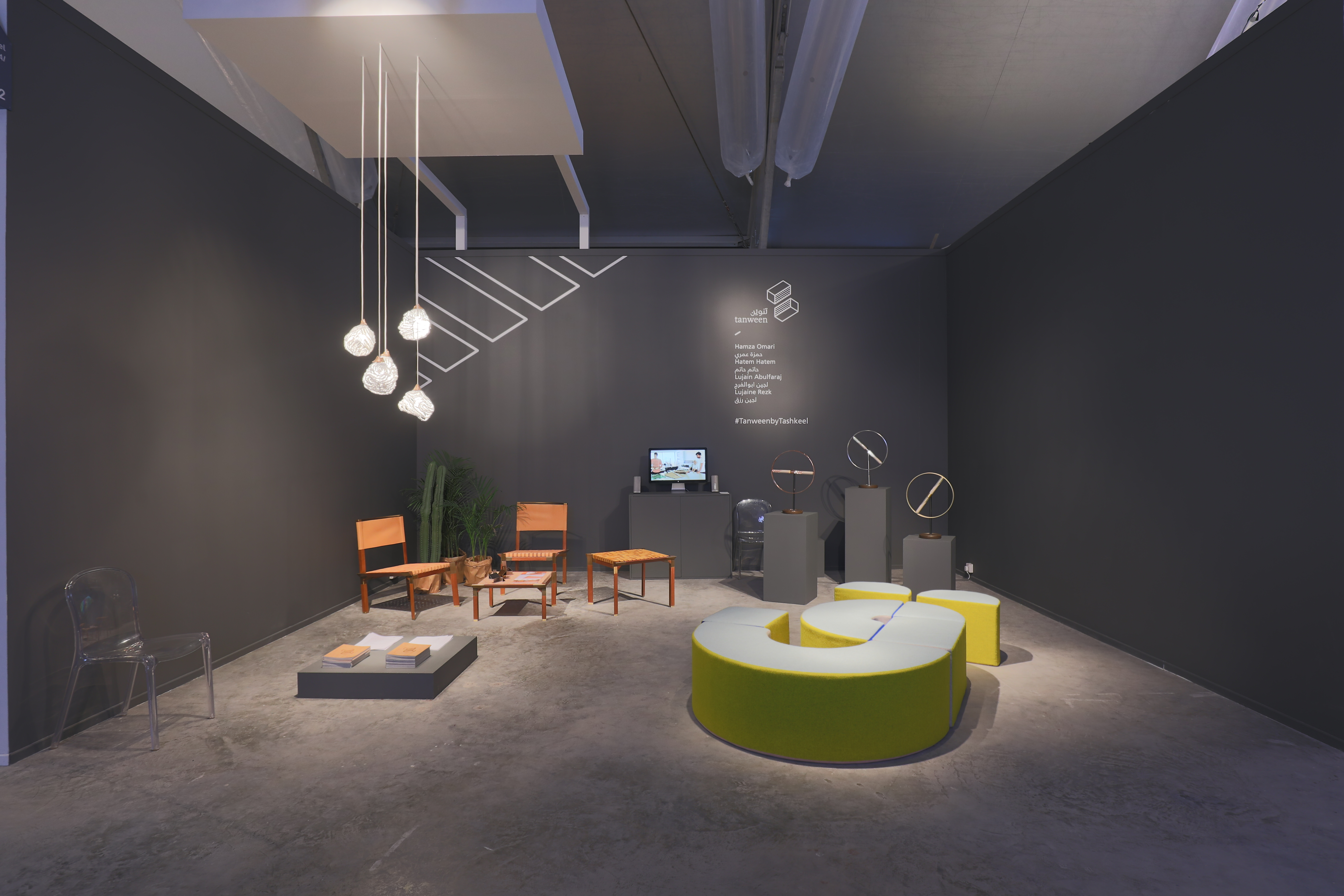
Tanween booth during Design Days Dubai 2017 in d3, featuring works by Lujaine Rezk, Lujain Abulfaraj, Hatem Hatem, and Hamza Omari.

Tanween is a design programme initiated in 2013 under the name Design Road Pro. Through an annual open call, it takes a selected cohort of emerging UAE-based designers through a nine-month development programme to take a product inspired by the surroundings of the UAE from concept to completion. The products are exhibited at Dubai Design Week, and were formerly exhibited at Design Days Dubai. As of 2018, the mentors and trainers that have been part of the programme include London-based design studios Gareth Neal and Glithero, founder of Make Works Fi Scott, Small is Beautiful co-producer Roanne Dods as well as local collaborations with Fikra design studio Salem Al-Qassimi, Kevin Badni (Dean of the College of Arts and Creative Enterprises at Zayed University), Khalid Shafar, and Jumana Taha of Dubai-based Studio MUJU.

Alumni include Abdulla Al Mulla, Aljoud Lootah, Zeinab Al-Hashemi, Latifa Saeed, Khalid Shafar, Salem Al-Mansoori, Lana El Samman, Alya Aleghfeli, Renad Hussein, Lina Ghalib, Nada Abu Shaqra, Neda Salmanpour, Hala Al-Ani, Myrtille Ronteix, Hatem Hatem, Hamza Omari, Amer Aldour, Zuleika Penniman, Lujaine Rezk, Lujain Abulfaraj, Rand Abdul Jabar, Talin Hazbar, and Saher Olver Samman.

"Tanween has been an impetus for much growth in Emirati design and production. The forerunner of Tanween, Design Road Pro, was a collaboration between Tashkeel, Barcelona's Creative Dialogue Association and Dubai Culture & Arts Authority. The participants were Khalid Shafar, Aljoud Lootah, Zeinab Al Hashemi and Salem Al Mansoori. All have become established names on the region's design scene. Former Tanween students participate in critical events such as Design Days, and believe the program helped them to think more critically as designers." (Archiexpo, 2017)

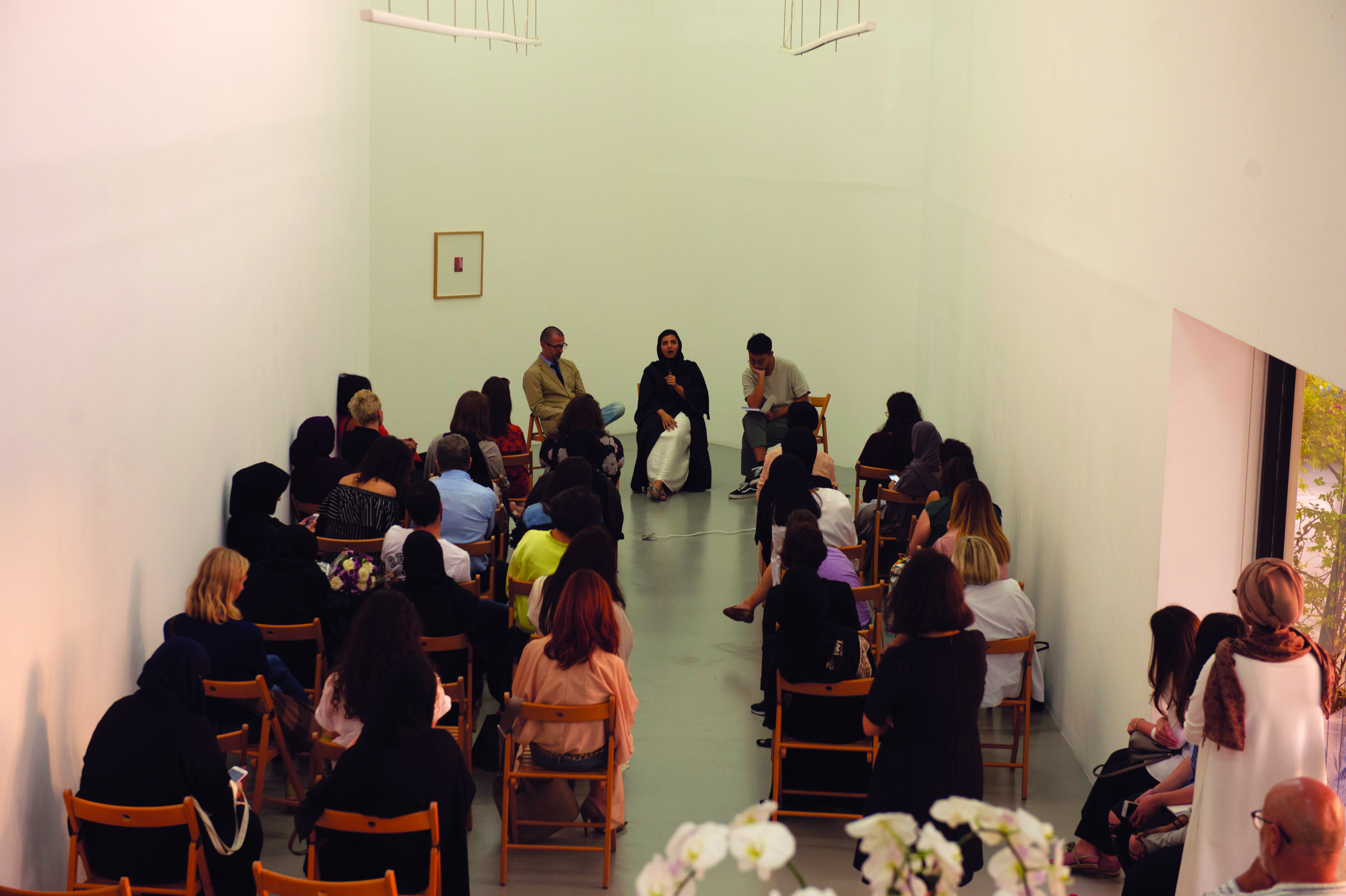
CPP participant Hadeyeh Badri in the Tashkeel gallery talking about her exhibition The Body Keeps the Score (2017) with Roderick Grant and Lantian Xie.

=== Critical Practice Programme (CPP) ===
The Critical Practice Programme is a research and discourse-led programme that invites artists to embark on a one-year development programme of studio practice, mentorship and training that culminates in a major solo presentation. Each programme is carefully constructed and built around the individual candidates' practices and/or area of research. Tashkeel works with the artist or curator to identify a key collaborator/mentor to build, challenge and work with them through the programme. This collaborator can be an artist, curator, critic or arts professional with whom the artist feels both comfortable working but also whose own area of research and/or practice ties in with the proposed programme and intended areas of focus.

The aim of the programme is to provide the artist with sustained and empowering support to develop their work in an environment that encourages progressive experimentation, cross-discipline exchange and cross-cultural dialogue. The curation of the courses remain responsive to the social, cultural and political contexts inherent in Dubai and the wider Middle East.

=== Middle East Emergent Designer Prize (in collaboration with Van Cleef and Arpels) ===
The Van Cleef & Arpels Middle East Emergent Designer Prize in collaboration with Tashkeel is an annual prize, which aims to nurture emerging talent across the GCC and create global awareness by highlighting the region's best designs. Each year over 80 applicants across the Persian Gulf region compete for the chance to produce their concepts inspired by a specific theme and win an all-expenses paid trip to L'École Van Cleef & Arpels in Paris. Past winners include Salem Al Mansoori, Vikram Divecha, Ivan Parati, Ranim Orouk and Hamza Omari.

== Residencies ==
Tashkeel residencies facilitate dialogue and exchange of experience, knowledge and skills across various disciplines of contemporary art and design. They support the creative growth of emerging and established visual artists and designers, encouraging experimentation with new concepts and materials.

Notable residencies
2011-2017	A.I.R	in collaboration with Dubai Culture & Arts Authority, Delfina Foundation and Art Dubai.	Alumni include Abbas Akhavan, Ammar Al Attar, Areej Kaoud, Deniz Üster, Ebtisam Abdulaziz, Hind Mezaina, Jumairy, Lydia Ourahmane, Mohammed Ahmed Ibrahim, Moza Al Matrooshi, Sharmeen Syed, Sunoj Das, Yudi Noor.
2011-12	Guest Artist		Amartey Golding
2012-13	Guest Artist		Ruben Sanchez
2014-15	Guest Artist		eL Seed
2014-15	New Media Residency		Fari Bradley and Chris Weaver
2016	See Saw Seeds	in collaboration with C.A.P (Kobe Studio Y3)	Aya Sakoda, Ruba Al Araji, Tulip Hazbar, Yuki Tsukiyama
2017	Guest Artists		Fay McCaul and Christine Müller
2018	Residents	in collaboration with Art Dubai	Zohra Opuku, Jennifer İpekel and José Lerma
2019	Print Studio Artist-in-Residence	in collaboration with Dundee Contemporary Arts	Salama Nasib, Sarah Burt

== Workshops ==
Tashkeel has a year-round programme of workshops and courses for all abilities and ages. Theoretical courses for practitioners include Critical Dialogues, which explores the mechanisms of critique, and Professional Practice.

"There's an appetite and even a hunger for these forums of discussion and exchange," Jones says. "My experience at Tashkeel opened my eyes to that. This group of women really benefitted from each other's experience above and beyond what the subject matter was." (Kevin Jones on the Critical Dialogues workshop sessions he leads at Tashkeel).

Intensive courses on Arabic type design and typography are delivered annually in Dubai by the Khatt Foundation, a Tashkeel partner.

Tashkeel is a partner of Youth xHub, a UAE Federal Government initiative organized by Emirates Youth Council, delivering a monthly programme of creative talks and workshops to people aged under 30.

== Publications ==
In addition to its exhibition catalogues, Tashkeel has published the following:

Reference Point: A History of Tashkeel and UAE Art (Tashkeel, 2018)

First Edition | English & Arabic

Featuring contributions by Lateefa bint Maktoum, Anabelle de Gersigny, Beth Derderian, Kevin Jones, Mark Pilkington, Melissa Gronlund, Mishaal Al Gergawi and Riem Ibrahim, this book marks the 10th anniversary of Tashkeel, the leading Dubai-based contemporary art and design organisation. It explores not only the growth of Tashkeel since 2008 (and the practitioners who have been part of its development) but also that of the UAE arts scene: From the expansion of entities such as Sharjah Art Foundation and Warehouse421, to growth of the gallery, auction house and arts publishing sectors, tertiary education provision and the establishment of areas including Al Quoz and Dubai Design District.

Arabic Type design for beginners (Khatt Books/Tashkeel, 2013)

First Edition | English & Arabic

This fully illustrated bilingual guidebook on Arabic type design is the result of a series of workshops organised by the Khatt Foundation and hosted by Tashkeel in 2011 and 2012. It presents step-by-step instructions on the design principles and tools of Arabic type design, with detailed tutorials by some of the most renown specialists in the field of contemporary Arabic type design and calligraphy. In addition, it showcases the creative process through nine case studies of the fonts produced during these workshops, presenting them as sources of inspiration and examples for new and experimental Arabic typefaces.

Never Forget: An Illustrated Guide to Dubai's Best Kept Secrets

by Khalid Mezaina (Tashkeel, 2013)

First Edition | English & Arabic

An activity book for the young and young at heart. This illustrated publication features the under-appreciated areas in the city of Dubai. Learn about Dubai's best kept secrets, and colour or draw your way for an amusing read.

Biladi (Tashkeel, 2010)

First Edition | English & Arabic

Published to coincide with the contemporary exhibition at Shanghai EXPO2010, 'Biladi' is a set of largescale postcards by Emirati artists including Lateefa bint Maktoum, Hind Mezaina, Zeinab Al Hashemi, Ebtisam Abdulaziz, Afra bin Dhaher, Khalid Mezaina, Maryam Al Qassimi, Reem Al Ghaith and Shamma Al Amri.

== See also ==
- Art in Dubai
- Dubai Culture & Arts Authority
