= Jumana (given name) =

- Gender: Feminine
- Language: Arabic

Origin
- Meaning: "Rarest pearl"
- Region of origin: Arab countries

Other names
- Alternative spelling: Jumanah, Joumana

Jumana or Jumanah (جمانة), meaning "rarest pearl", is an Arabic feminine given name.

Notable people with the name include:

- Jumanah bint Abi Talib, companion and cousin of the Islamic prophet Muhammad, and sister of imam Ali ibn Abi Talib
- Jumana El Husseini (1932–2018), Palestinian painter and sculptor
- Jumana Emil Abboud, Palestinian artist
- Jumana Ghunaimat (born 1973), Jordanian journalist and politician
- Joumana Haddad (born 1970), Lebanese author, journalist and women's rights activist
- Jumana Hanna (born 1962), Iraqi woman known for falsifying the account of her imprisonment during the rule of Saddam Hussein
- Jumana Manna (born 1987), American-Palestinian artist
- Jumana Murad (born 1973), Syrian actress and producer
- Jumana Taha (born 1941), Syrian writer
- Jumana Abdu Rahman (born 1996), Indian actress and internet celebrity

== See also ==
- Joumana
