= Georges Kachaamy =

Lebanese architect

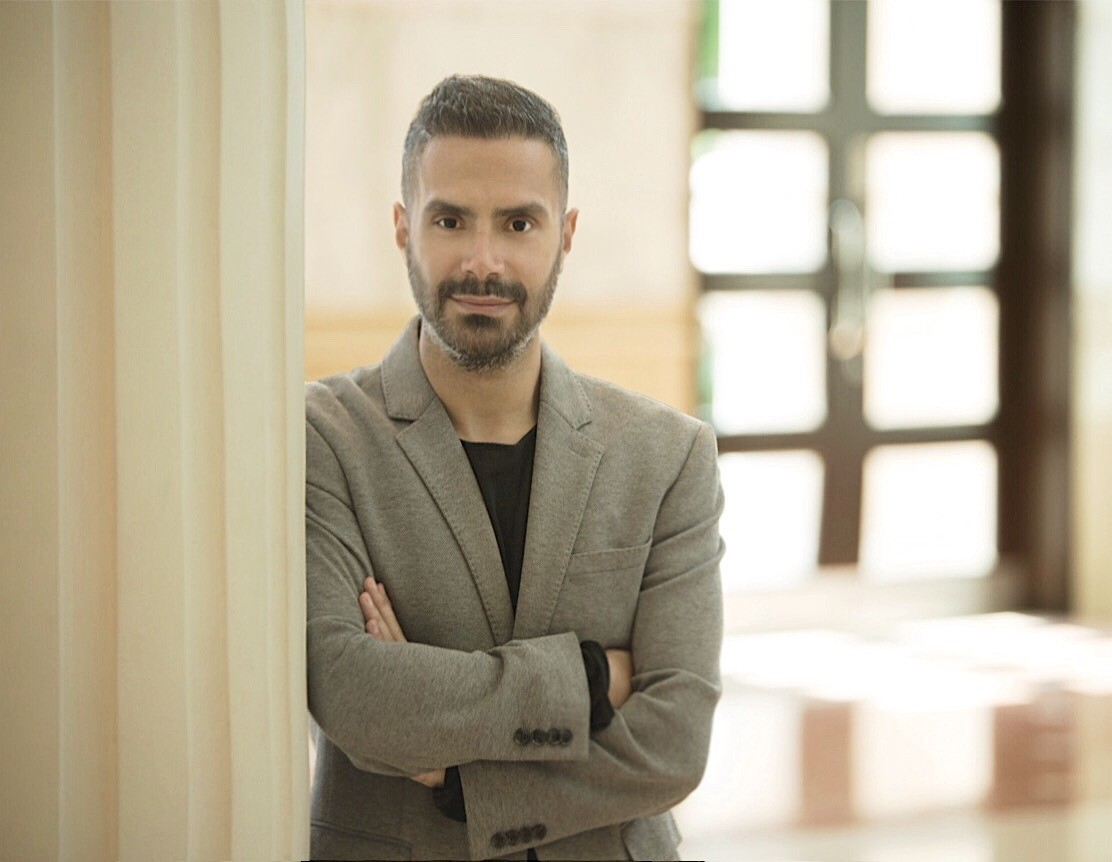
- Born: 27 June 1978 (age 47); Beirut, Lebanon
- Occupation: Architect
- Awards: Monbukagakusho Scholarship (2004-2007)

Georges Kachaamy (born June 27, 1978) is the current director of research, innovation, and design center at the American University in Dubai (AUD). He is an associate professor of architecture, architect, artist, scholar, and a philosopher. He has served as the chairperson of the department of architecture at AUD’s school of architecture, art, and design under which the architecture program has received the National Architectural Accrediting Board (NAAB) accreditation. In 2013 he served on the board of the American Institute of Architects (AIA) Middle East Chapter as the director of continuing education. His ongoing research that covers architecture and technologies, deals specifically with gravity defiant architecture (GDA) and has received the attention of many media outlets such as CNN, the Middle East Broadcast Center (MBC1), Sky News Arabia, MTV (Lebanon), Future TV, ArchDaily, and Middle East Architect magazine.

== Early life and education ==
Georges Kachaamy was born in Bekfaya, Lebanon. He holds a DES (Diplôme d'Etudes Supérieures) in architecture from the Lebanese Academy of Fine Arts (Académie Libanaise des Beaux-Arts, ALBA) and a Ph.D. in architecture from the University of Tokyo. His passion for exploration has led him to Japan when he was offered the Japanese Government Monbukagakusho Scholarship in order to pursue his graduate studies at the University of Tokyo. Georges Kachaamy is trilingual, and can speak English, Arabic, and French. He is also proficient in conversational Japanese.

== Career ==
As a scholar, his research relates to future environments, space planning, design, phenomenological theory in architecture, and evidence-based spatial experiments. Georges Kachaamy has over 15 years of experience in the architectural field among three cities, Dubai, Tokyo, and Beirut. He worked on different national and international urban and architectural designs. His work spans from universal spaces of meditation to the urban conservation and design studies for cultural heritages and urban developments. He has published many articles and has been involved in architecture, art talks, and exhibitions in Tokyo, Venice, Salerno, Madrid, and Dubai. He was invited by the European Cultural Center to exhibit his best-known ongoing architectural research "Rising Oases" and his artwork "Unconscious" at the Palazzo Bembo in the context of the Venice Biennale.

Georges Kachaamy is mostly known for his vision towards a futuristic architecture that liberates itself from the ground. His main ongoing research and work, relates to Gravity Defiant Architecture (GDA), has produced and exhibited prototypes in many forums. His latest model was showcased in Dubai Design Week 2019 (DDW) at Dubai Design District (D3).

== Recognition ==
Georges Kachaamy has won international prizes from renowned organizations such as the International Union of Architects, UIA (Union Internationale des Architectes). In 2014 he received the American University in Dubai President’s award for teaching excellence and in 2019 he has earned the President's Award for Institutional Effectiveness and the Provost's Award for Creativity in Design and the Visual Arts.

== Personal life ==
Georges Kachaamy currently resides in Dubai. He is the youngest of four siblings. His mother Georgette Hashem Kachaamy was a writer, journalist and a supporter of feminism. In 2006, his parents have joined his siblings in the USA and are residing between California and Arizona.
