= Faiza Bouguessa =

Algerian-French fashion designer and creative director (born 1983)

Faiza Bouguessa (born 1983) is an Algerian-French fashion designer and creative director. She is the founder of Bouguessa, a fashion brand which aims to familiarize modest clothing while being eco-friendly.

== Early life and education ==
Faiza Bouguessa was born in France to Algerian parents. She grew up in France, around women who were passionate about fashion and design. Her grandmother was a seamstress, and Faiza's first introduction to garment making was in her early years while spending time with her grandmother, who taught her the basics of knitting and sewing. Her mother encouraged her to become a fashion designer from a young age.

Bouguessa took numerous internships in tailor shops while studying English literature at Jean Moulin university in Lyon from 2002 until 2004. Throughout these internships, she learned the basics of pattern making and developed an understanding for fabric characteristics. She was unable to attend fashion school due to financial restraints.

While slowly building her brand and position into the fashion world, she was a fashion stylist for Freelance in Dubai (2010 - 2013) and also part of the cabin crew for the airline Emirates in Dubai (2006-2012).

== Career ==
With Roland Mouret's help as a mentor, and drawing on her love of her French-Algerian heritage and values, Bouguessa founded her brand, Bouguessa, in her studio in Dubai Design District in 2014. She had met Mouret through a mentoring program with the Dubai Fashion and Design Council.

The clothing brand initially sold abayas, before expanding to garments such as dresses, shirts, trousers and coats. The main objective behind the brand is to promote sustainability within clothing by integrating a cross-cultural communication and acceptance towards modest fashion and to ensure women of backgrounds and sizes to feel confident and comfortable in her clothing. Bouguessa aims to achieve these aims by taking a minimalist approach to wardrobe staples, with "soft hues and clean lines," and drawing inspiration from clothing such as kaftans, and abayas to bridge the gap between cultures. The brand releases four collections each year.

The brand made an appearance at Milan Fashion Week in 2015. Bouguessa's designs grew immensely in popularity when Beyoncé wore a piece by Bouguessa for a photoshoot in 2017. The piece sold out nearly instantly. In 2018, some of Bouguessa's designs were included in an exhibit on contemporary Muslim fashion curated by the Fine Arts Museums of San Francisco.

In 2021, Bouguessa was ranked 29th in Forbes' list of 40 Women Behind Middle Eastern Brands; the next year, she was ranked 26th on their 30 Women Behind Middle Eastern Brands list.

== Personal life ==
Bougessa is married.
