= Joumana =

Joumana is an Arabic feminine given name. Notable people with the name include:

- Joumana Bassil Chelala (born 1966), Lebanese banker
- Joumana Haddad (born 1970), Lebanese author
- Joumana Kidd (born 1972), American actress and journalist

== See also ==
- Jumana (disambiguation)
