= Leyla Uluhanli =

Leyla Uluhanli is awards-winning interior and furniture designer, gallerist and books author.

== Career ==
=== Interior design ===
Leyla Uluhanli was born and grew up in Baku, Azerbaijan. Leyla has started working on residential interiors in early 2000, both on her own commissions and in collaboration with international interior designers. In 2005, she has established her own interior design studio in Moscow, Russia and completed numerous high-end projects in Baku, Moscow, New York, Istanbul, Lisbon, Dubai, London, Tashkent and other metropolitan cities mostly in Europe and Middle East.

Constant member of different TOP100 lists. Awarded the 2019 Best Decorator Award by ELLE Decoration Russia.Currently, Leyla is working on projects around the world.

=== Furniture design ===
In 2014, Leyla Uluhanli launched her first furniture collection inspired by Mid-century modern style and the Swinging Sixties. In 2016, Leyla Uluhanli Collection was showcased at the Maison & Objet exhibition in Paris, with the second collection previewed during Downtown Design exhibition in Dubai in 2018

=== Art Gallery ===
In 2020 Leyla Uluhanli founder the ULUHANLI GALLERY offering art and collectable furniture.

=== Books ===
Since 2017 Leyla Uluhanli has started her sacred architecture books series published by Rizzoli New York, currently presented in most important libraries of the world.

== “Mosques: Splendors of Islam” book ==
In late 2017, Rizzoli New York. have published the “Mosques: Splendors of Islam” book by Leyla Uluhanli composed over 5 years of research and travel, The foreword of the book was written by Prince Amyn Aga Khan.

In June, 2018, the book received gold status in the Foreword Indies Book of the Year Award in the Architecture category The French edition of the book has been published in 2018 by Citadelles et Mazenod

== "Synagogues: Marvels of Judaism" book ==
In late 2021, the new book on sacral architecture by Leyla Uluhanli have been published by Rizzoli New York . At the same time the French edition of the book has been published by Citadelles at Mazenod.

The foreword of the book was written by Judy Glickman Lauder, a prominent philanthropist supporting Jewish cultural-heritage endeavors and the author of Beyond the Shadows: Photographs of The Holocaust and The Danish Exception.
