= Jasad =

Jasad may refer to:

- Jatiya Samajtantrik Dal, a political party in Bangladesh
- Jasad (magazine), an Arabic-language cultural magazine
- Jasad (band), an Indonesian death metal band
