= Humana (disambiguation) =

Humana is an American health insurance company.

Humana may also refer to:

- Humana Press, an American publisher
- Humana Milchunion, a German dairy company
- Humana People to People, a Swiss non-governmental organization
- Humana people, a historic ethnic group of Texas and Mexico
- Numana, historically also Humana, a town in Italy

== See also ==
- Jumana (disambiguation)
