= HMS Jumna =

Three ships of the Royal Navy have borne the name HMS Jumna, after another name for the Yamuna River in India. A ship of the Royal Indian Navy has been named HMIS Jumna:

- HMS Jumna (1832) was an iron paddle vessel launched in 1832. Her fate is unknown.
- HMS Jumna (1848) was a 16-gun brig-sloop built as HMS Zebra but renamed in 1846 and launched in 1848. She was sold in 1862.
- HMS Jumna (1866) was an iron screw troopship launched in 1866. She became a coal hulk in 1893 and took the name C110. She was sold in 1922 as the hulk Oceanic.
- HMIS Jumna (U21) was a modified Black Swan-class sloop launched in 1940. She was later commissioned into the Indian Navy as INS Jamuna and became a survey ship in 1957 before being paid off and broken up in 1980.

None of these should be confused with Jumna (ship), though the latter's place and date of commissioning are very close to those of HMS Jumna 1866.
