= EL Seed =

French-Tunisian artist (born 1981)

eL Seed
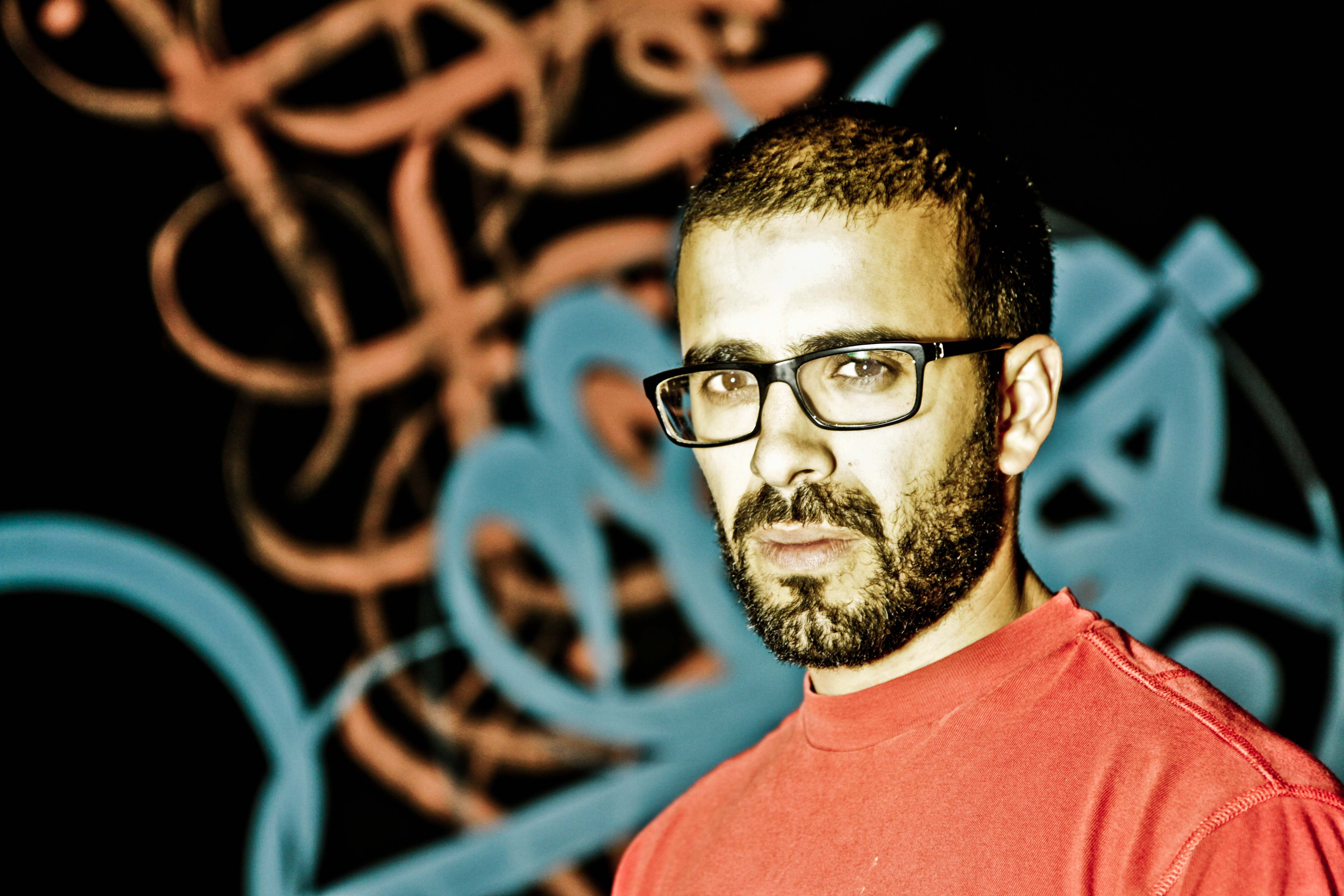
- Born: 21 August 1981 (age 44); Le Chesnay, Île-de-France, France
- Known for: Art installation, sculpture, murals
- Notable work: Perception in Cairo, Egypt
- Website: elseed-art.com

eL Seed (born 1981), is a French Tunisian calligraphy artist and muralist, whose work feature the Arabic language through graffiti (sometimes referred to as Calligraffiti).

== Early life and career ==
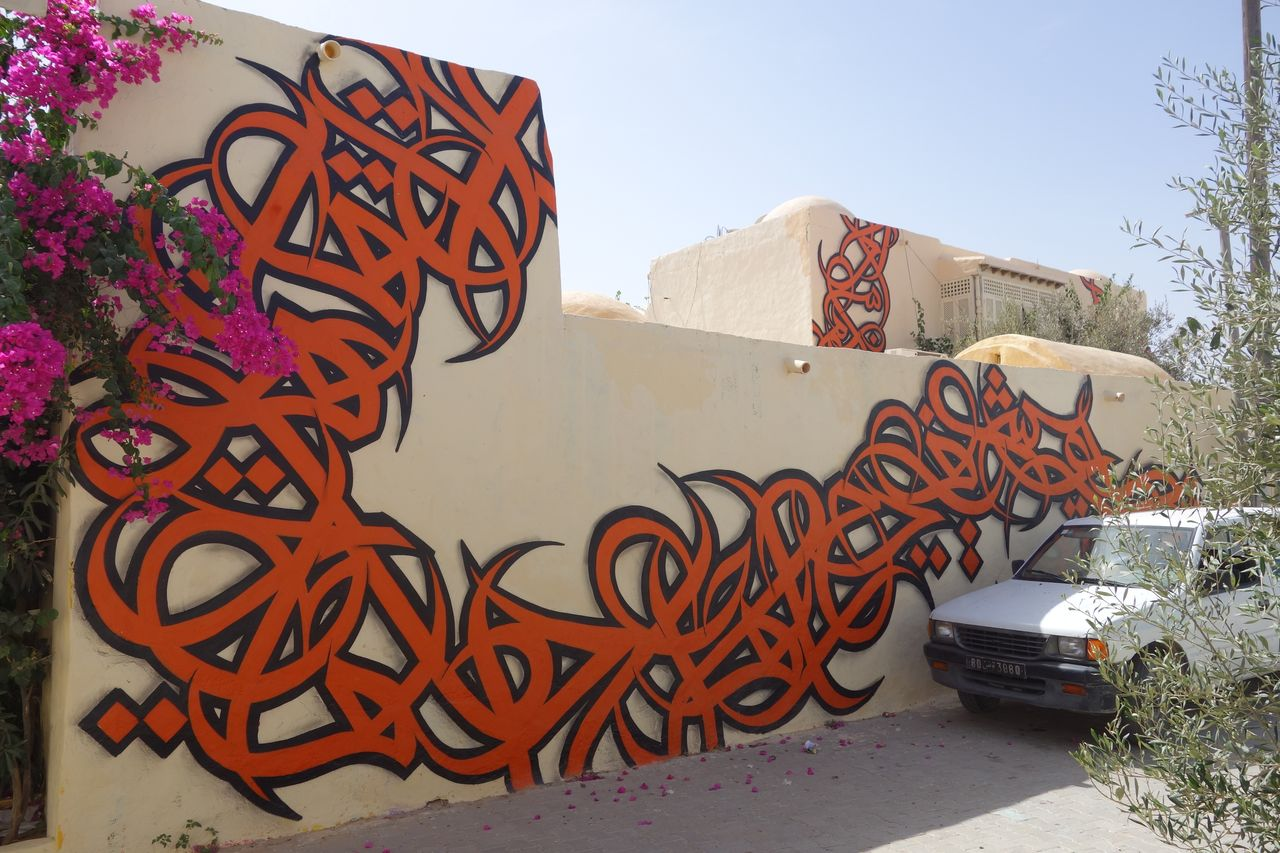
Djerbahood, Tunisia

Born to a Tunisian family in Paris in 1981, eL Seed grew up speaking only the Tunisian dialect, and did not learn to read or write standard Arabic until his teens, when he discovered an interest in his Tunisian roots.

As a street artist, he took the name "elSeed" from the French play, Le Cid, which his teacher was reading to his class in school. The name, El Cid, in turn, is based on the Arabic term, Al Sayed, which means "the man." He cites the 2011 Tunisian Revolution as a major factor in the opening of political space to alternate forms of expression: "The revolution pushed people to be more creative because before they were scared – and now they have more freedom."

He created his first large-scale mural one year after the beginning of the Tunisian revolution in the city of Kairouan. This mural was a calligraphic representation of passage from a Tunisian poem by Abu al-Qasim al-Husayfi, dedicated to those struggling against tyranny and injustice. His work derives influences from other graffiti artists including; Hest 1 and Shuck 2 along with Arabic poets such as Mahmood Darwish and Nizar Qabbani.

In an interview with the media, he explained his desire to make political statements:

"I always make sure that I am writing messages, but there are also layers of political and social context and that's what I am trying to add into my work. The aesthetic is really important, that's what captures your attention, but then I try to open a dialogue that's based on the location and my choice of text."

His most controversial project was the 2012 painting of a minaret of the Jara Mosque in the southern Tunisian city of Gabes. About the project, el Seed explained, "My goal was to bring people together, which is why I chose these words from the Quran. I like graffiti because it brings art to everyone. I like the fact of democratizing art. I hope it will inspire other people to do crazy projects and not to be scared".

eL Seed's art has been displayed in exhibitions in Berlin, Chicago, Dubai, Paris, and São Paulo. He has also painted murals on the walls of cities including Melbourne, London, and Toronto, in addition to multiple Tunisian cities.

=== Perception, Cairo, Egypt ===
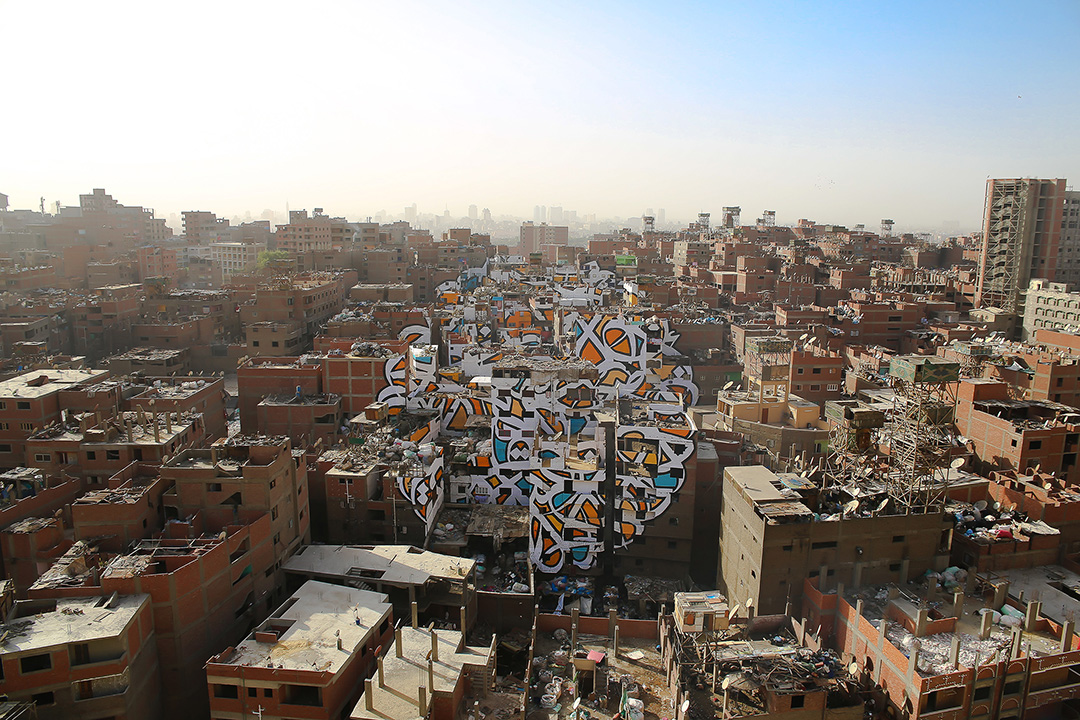
Zaraeeb in Cairo, Egypt, 2016

In his latest project ‘Perception’, eL Seed is questioning the level of judgment and misconception society can unconsciously have upon a community based on their differences. In the neighborhood of Manshiyat Nasr in Cairo, the Coptic community of Zaraeeb collects the trash of the city for decades and developed the most efficient and highly profitable recycling system on a global level. Still, the place is perceived as dirty, marginalized and segregated. To bring light on this community, with his team and the help of the local community, eL Seed created an anamorphic piece that covers almost 50 buildings only visible from a certain point of the Muqattam Mountain. The piece of art uses the words of Saint Athanasius of Alexandria, a Coptic Bishop from the 3rd century, that said: ‘Anyone who wants to see the sunlight clearly needs to wipe his eye first.'

"The Zaraeeb community welcomed my team and me as if we were family. It was one of the most amazing human experiences I have ever had. They are generous, honest and strong people. They have been given the name of Zabaleen (the garbage people), but this is not how they call themselves. They don't live in the garbage but from the garbage; and it is not their garbage, but the garbage of the whole city. They are the ones who clean the city of Cairo."

=== Salwa Road, Doha, Qatar ===
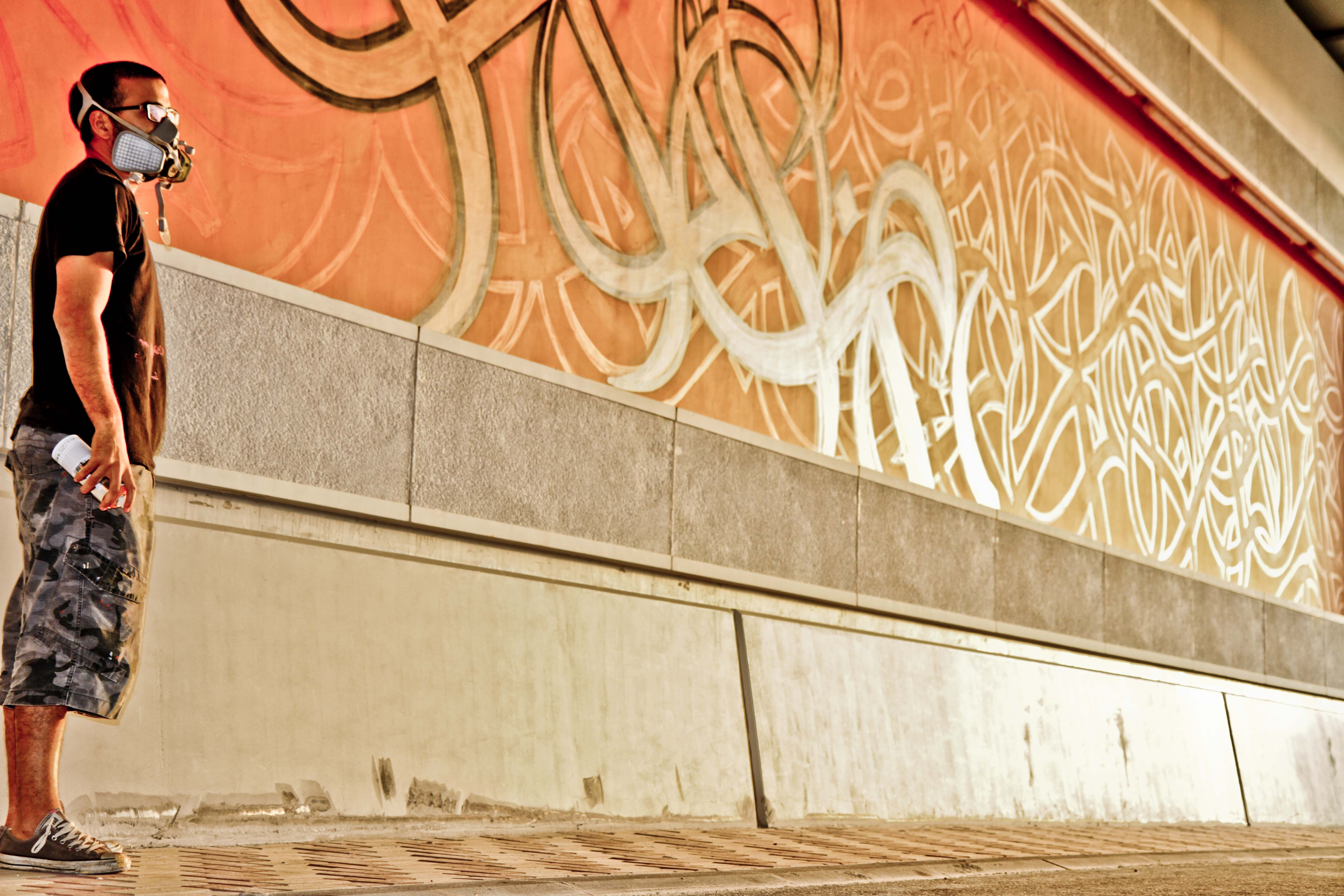
Salwa Road, Doha, Qatar, 2013

In early 2013, eL Seed was commissioned by the Qatar Museums Authority to create a series of 52 artworks in Doha's Salwa Road area.

=== Art on Jara Mosque, Gabes, Tunisia ===
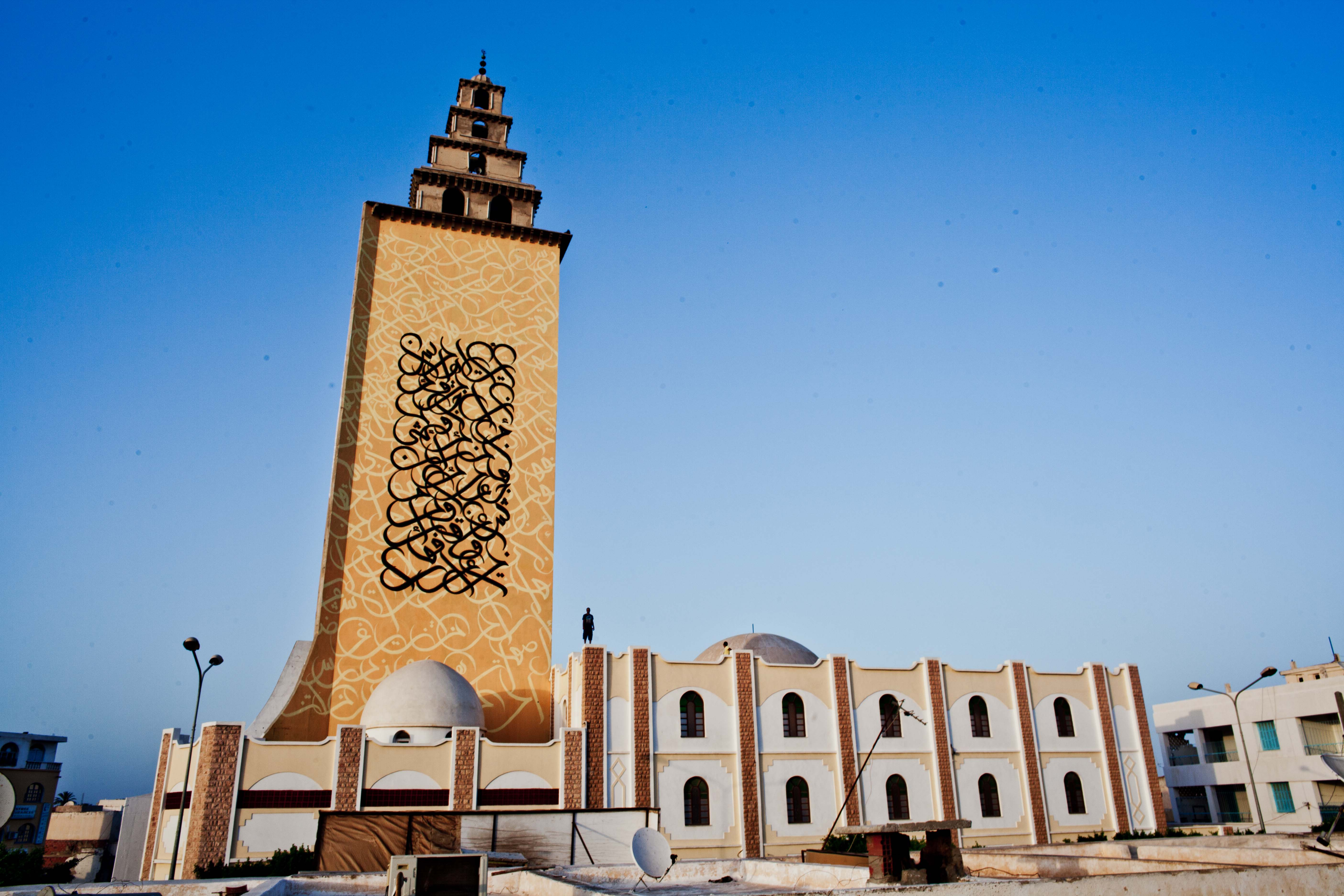
Jara Mosque in Gabes, Tunisia, 2012

Reacting to the clashes between religious sects and the art community in Tunisia, the artist embarked on a project to transform this religious landmark into a public artwork during the holy month of Ramadan. eL Seed's large-scale production cites traditional principles of Arabic script with a modern sensibilities.

Recent tensions in Tunisia have sparked a critical debate about the limits of artistic freedoms in the birthplace of the Arab Spring as it undergoes a nascent transition to democracy. "This project is not about decorating a mosque, it is about making art a visible actor in the process of cultural and political change," comments el Seed, who started work on the mural on 20 July. "I truly believe that art can bring about fruitful debate, especially within the uncertain political climate right now in Tunisia."

The project was approved by the Governor of Gabès and the mosque's imam, Shaikh Slah Nacef. The 57-metre-high (187-foot) mural will permanently cover the entire concrete tower face of Jara Mosque in hopes of highlighting the convergence of art and religion and raising the public's awareness by infusing art directly into the urban landscape. Exhibiting the words, "Oh humankind, we have created you from a male and a female and made people and tribes so you may know each other," eL Seed quoted a verse from the Quran which addresses the importance of mutual respect and tolerance through knowledge as an obligation.

"I hope that this artistic wall on the minaret will help to revive the city, and especially tourism in Gabes," commented Shaykh Slah Nacef.

== Work ==
=== Exhibitions ===
- 2012 October 2012 – The Walls, solo exhibition – Itinerrance Gallery, Paris
- 2013 Solo exhibition – Medina, Tunis
- 2014 Declaration, sculpture exhibition – Tashkeel Gallery, Dubai
- 2016 Cairo – Arttalks.

=== Bibliography ===
- Lost Walls: a Calligraffiti Journey through Tunisia. From Here to Fame, Berlin (2014)

== Personal life ==
eL Seed is based in Dubai.

== See also ==
- Calligraffiti
- French art
- Islamic art
- Islamic calligraphy
- List of French artists
- Tower 13
