= Jumana =

Jumana may refer to:

- Jumana (given name), an Arabic given name (including a list of people with the name)
- Jumana language, a language of Colombia
- Jumana people (Mexico and Texas), a historic ethnic group of North America

== See also ==
- Jamuna (disambiguation)
