= SS Jumna (British India Steam Navigation Company) =

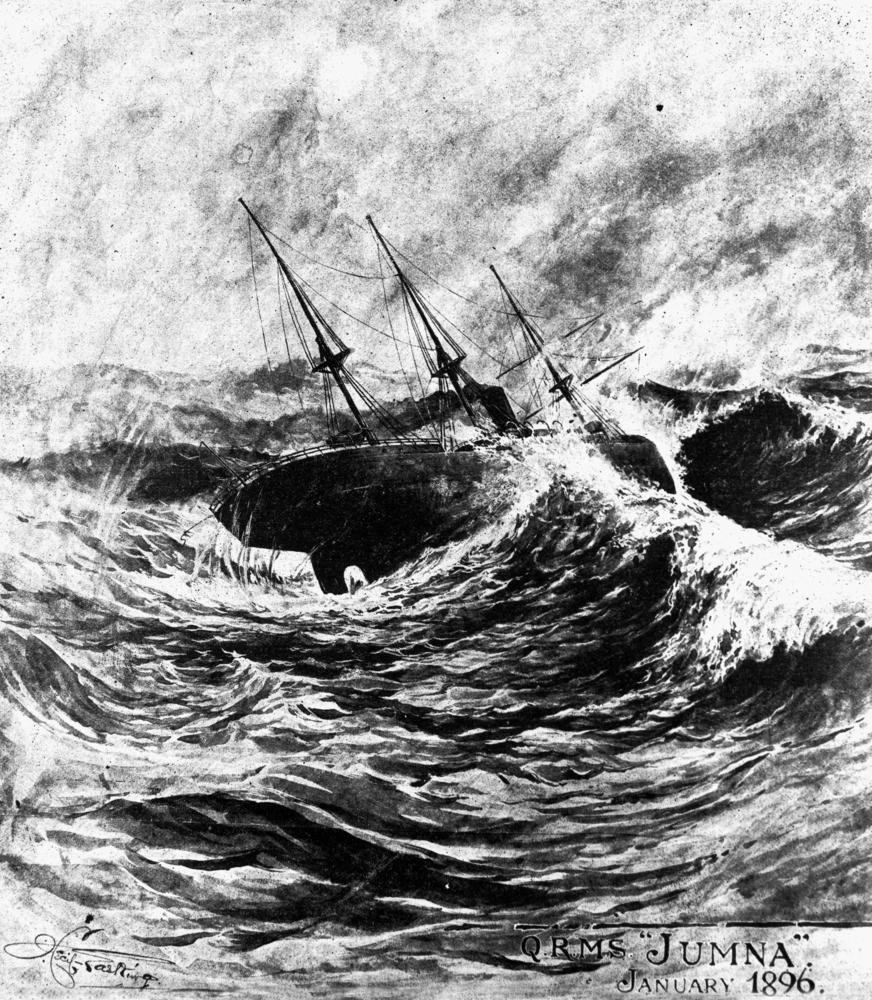
- SS Jumna anchored off the Queensland coast, c. 1896

History

United Kingdom
- Name: SS Jumna
- Namesake: Jumna River, India
- Owner: British India Associated Steamers Ltd
- Operator: British India Steam Navigation Company
- Route: London to Brisbane via Suez Canal
- Ordered: 1885
- Builder: William Denny and Brothers, Dumbarton
- Yard number: 312
- Launched: 1886
- Completed: 1886
- Maiden voyage: 1886

General characteristics
- Type: Passenger and cargo steamship
- Tonnage: 5,197
- Length: 410 feet (125.0 m)
- Beam: 48 feet (14.6 m)
- Draft: 26 feet (7.9 m)
- Propulsion: Quadruple-expansion engine, single screw
- Sail plan: Three-masted auxiliary rig
- Capacity: 500–700 steerage/assisted passengers, saloon class

SS Jumna was a 5,197-ton steel passenger and cargo steamship built in 1886 by William Denny and Brothers in Dumbarton, Scotland, for British India Associated Steamers Ltd (managed by the British India Steam Navigation Company). Constructed specifically to serve the Queensland Royal Mail route, she carried mail, cargo, and thousands of assisted immigrants from Great Britain to Australia during the late 19th century.

== Construction and design ==
Jumna was ordered in 1885 and launched in 1886 from the shipyard of William Denny and Brothers at Dumbarton on the River Clyde. Measuring 5,197 gross register tons, the vessel featured an all-steel hull and was equipped with a state-of-the-art quadruple-expansion engine driving a single screw propeller. To supplement her steam propulsion on long oceanic passages, she carried three auxiliary-rigged masts.

Designed to accommodate the British-to-Australia immigrant trade, the ship's 'tween-decks were fitted out to house between 500 and 700 steerage and government-assisted passengers, alongside accommodation for a small number of first-class saloon passengers.

== Service history ==
=== Queensland Royal Mail Service ===
The vessel was built under a major mail and passenger transport contract between the Queensland Colonial Government and British India Associated Steamers. Operating on the Queensland Royal Mail line, Jumna connected London directly with coastal Queensland via the Suez Canal, offering a shorter transit time compared to the traditional Cape of Good Hope route.

On her standard outbound run from England, the ship departed London (calling at the Royal Albert Docks or Gravesend) and traversed the Mediterranean to call at Port Said and Suez in Egypt, followed by Aden and Batavia (now Jakarta, Indonesia). Upon entering Australian waters through the Torres Strait, Jumna called at various northern and central Queensland ports—including Thursday Island, Cooktown, Townsville, Bowen, Mackay, and Rockhampton (via tender offloading at Keppel Bay or Port Alma)—before terminating at Brisbane (Moreton Bay and the South Brisbane Wharves).

=== Transit times ===
In 1887, Jumna undertook regular scheduled voyages between England and Australia. On one benchmark voyage, she departed London on 29 July 1887 and completed her passage through the Suez Canal and East Indies, arriving off Rockhampton in Keppel Bay on 16 September 1887—a transit of 51 days. She reached her final destination in Brisbane on 18 September 1887 after 52 days end-to-end. These swift arrivals were widely recorded in contemporary shipping logs and local press reports.

== See also ==
- British India Steam Navigation Company
- Immigration to Australia
- Suez Canal
