= SS Jumna =

Steam passenger liner sunk during World War II

Coordinates: 44°51′N 27°45′W

History

United Kingdom
- Name: Jumna
- Namesake: Jamuna
- Owner: James Nourse, Ltd
- Port of registry: London
- Builder: A Stephen & Sons, Kelvinhaugh
- Yard number: 522
- Launched: 24 January 1929
- Completed: April 1929
- Identification: UK official number 161216; code letters LDBH (until 1933); call sign GSTH (1934 onward)
- Fate: Sunk by shellfire, 25 December 1940

General characteristics
- Type: passenger liner
- Tonnage: 6,078 GRT, 3,746 NRT
- Length: 423.9 ft (129.2 m)
- Beam: 55.9 ft (17.0 m)
- Draught: 25 ft 1 in (7.65 m)
- Depth: 28.1 ft (8.6 m)
- Installed power: 612 NHP
- Propulsion: 2 × triple expansion engines; 2 × exhaust steam turbines; 2 × screws
- Speed: 11 knots (20 km/h)
- Crew: 64
- Armament: DEMS
- Notes: sister ships: Saugor, Ganges

SS Jumna was a steam passenger liner that was built in Scotland in 1929 and sunk with all hands by a German cruiser on Christmas Day 1940. She was a ship in the fleet of James Nourse, Ltd, whose trade included taking indentured labourers from India to the British West Indies.

Jumna was named after the Jamuna river, a tributary of the Ganges. This was the second ship in the Nourse Line fleet to be called Jumna. The first Jumna was a sailing ship that was built in 1867, sold in 1898 and reported in 1899. The third was a motor ship that was built in 1962, renamed in 1972 and scrapped in 1985.

== Building ==
In 1928 Caird & Company of Greenock built a passenger steamship for James Nourse Ltd. In 1929 Alexander Stephen and Sons, Kelvinhaugh, Glasgow built a sister ship for her. Jumna was launched on 24 January and completed that April. In 1930 Harland and Wolff built a third sister ship, Ganges.

When they were new, Saugor, Jumna and Ganges were the biggest ships in the Nourse Line fleet. Jumna was 423.9 ft (129.2 m) long, her beam was 55.9 ft (17.0 m) and her depth was 28.1 ft (8.6 m). Her tonnages were 6,078 GRT and 3,746 NRT.

Jumna's main propulsion was from a pair of three-cylinder triple-expansion steam engines. Exhaust steam from the low-pressure cylinder of each piston engine powered a Bauer-Wach steam turbine. Each turbine drove the same shaft as its triple-expansion engine via double reduction gearing and a Föttinger fluid coupling. Between them the two piston engines and two turbines gave Jumna a speed of 11 knots (20 km/h).

Jumna was registered in London and her UK official number was 161216. Her code letters were LDBH until 1933–34, when they were superseded by the call sign GSTH.

== Second World War service ==
On 13 September 1939, in the first month of the Second World War, Jumna left Singapore. She called at Colombo, Bombay, Rangoon and Calcutta, and then sailed via Cape Town to the Caribbean, reaching Trinidad on New Year's Eve 1939.

Jumna left Trinidad on 5 January 1940, called at Barbados, San Juan, Jobos, San Pedro de Macorís, Kingston, Havana, Santiago de Cuba, Guantanamo Bay and Júcaro. On 3 March 1940 she left Júcaro for Halifax, Nova Scotia. She joined Convoy HX 28, which left Halifax on 8 March and reached Liverpool on 2 April. Jumna continued via Southend-on-Sea to Southampton, where she arrived on 24 April.

On 28 April 1940 Jumna left Spithead for the Indian Ocean. She sailed via convoys OA 138GF and OG 28F, which took her as far as Gibraltar. She then continued via Malta, the Suez Canal and Aden to Colombo, where she arrived on 22 June 1940 before calling at Rangoon and Calcutta.

On 14 July 1940 Jumna left Calcutta on her next trip to the Caribbean. She called at Cape Town, and on 28 August reached Trinidad. She called at Barbados, Kingston, Nuevitas, Caibarién and Havana, and reached Galveston, where she arrived on 5 October.

On 12 October 1940 Jumna left Galveston for Bermuda, where she joined Convoy BHX 83. This merged at sea with Convoy HX 83, which reached Liverpool on 7 November.

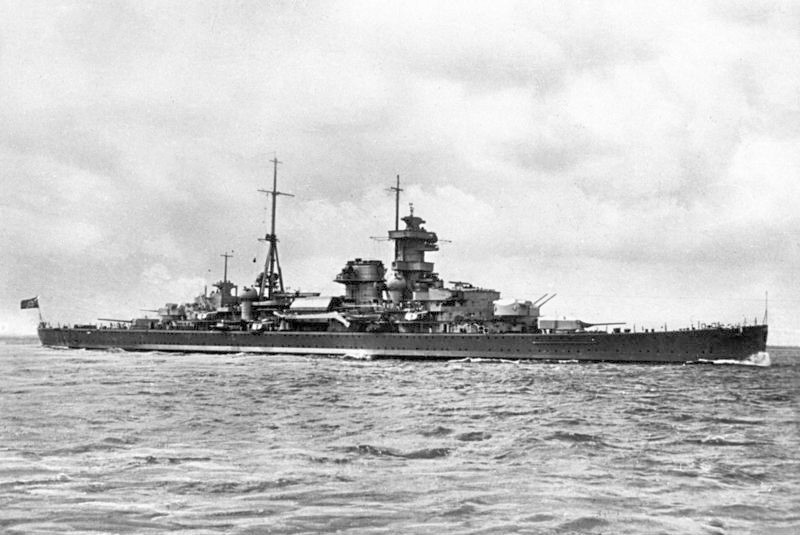
Admiral Hipper in 1939

On 16 December 1940 Jumna left Liverpool bound for Calcutta via Freetown. She was the commodore ship of Convoy OB 260, carrying the convoy commodore, Rear-Admiral Henry Maltby. On 19 December OB 260 dispersed at sea.

On Christmas Day 1940 the German cruiser Admiral Hipper attacked Jumna in the Atlantic Ocean north of the Azores. The cruiser shelled Jumna, sinking her and killing all 44 passengers and 64 crew aboard.

== Fate of sister ships ==
Neither of Jumna's sister ships survived the war. On 27 August 1941 U-557 sunk Saugor by torpedo, killing 59 of her complement. On 6 April 1942 Ganges sank with the loss of 15 of her complement after colliding with the Clan Line steamship Clan Macfarlane.
