= Yumana language =

Extinct Arawakan language

Jumana
- Yumana
- Native to: Brazil
- Region: Amazonas
- Era: attested c. 1810s
- Language family: Arawakan: Northern; Upper Amazonian; (unclassified); Jumana

Language codes
- ISO 639-3: None (mis)
- Glottolog: juma1250
- Linguasphere: 82-AFF-aa

Yumana (Jumana, Xomana, Ximana) is an extinct, poorly attested, and unclassified Arawakan language. It is attested only in a wordlist from Carl Friedrich Philipp von Martius and Johann Baptist von Spix published in 1867. The Jumana people are thought to reside in the Rio Puré National Park, alongside the Pasé and Carabayo (Yuri).

== Classification ==
Kaufman (1994) placed it in his Río Negro branch, but this is not followed in Aikhenvald (1999). It is grouped with Pasé in the Japurá-Colômbia branch by Ramirez and França (2019).
