= Jasad (magazine) =

Arabic-language cultural magazine

- Jasad cover March 2009
- Editor-in-chief: Joumana Haddad
- Categories: Cultural magazine
- Frequency: Quarterly
- First issue: 1 December 2008; 17 years ago
- Company: Al Joumana Publishing
- Country: Lebanon
- Based in: Beirut
- Language: Arabic
- Website: jasadmedia.org

Jasad (Arabic: جسد, "body") was an Arabic-language cultural magazine based in Beirut, specializing in the literature, art and science of the body. It was founded by Joumana Haddad.

== History and profile ==
Founded in 2008, the first issue of Jasad appeared in December of that same year, and it has raised a great deal of controversy ever since, because it tackles subjects that are taboo in the Arabic language and societies. For instance, in the March 2009 issue the magazine included articles about sexuality in the Arab world. Jasad is published by "Al Joumana". It is mainly in print, but small excerpts from each new issue are made available on its website. The founder, editor and publisher of the magazine is Lebanese poet and journalist Joumana Haddad who is also culture editor of An Nahar daily.

Jasad is distributed to readers worldwide through bookshops and/or by rapid courier via a yearly subscription system. It is a glossy magazine, 200 pages, sized 22 x 28 cm, and consists of different sections and columns, ranging from reportages, testimonies and articles, to essays, translations and creative writings, all covering the fields of cinema, literature, arts, theater, philosophy, science, revolving around the axis of the body. Saseen Kawzally regarded the magazine on 2 February 2009 as "very confusing" and as covering varied material that is not "entirely coherent".

== See also ==
List of magazines in Lebanon
