= Jumana Taha =

Syrian writer

- جمانة طه
- Born: 1941 (age 84–85); Jableh, Syria
- Occupations: Writer, novelist

Jumana Taha (Arabic: جمانة طه; born 1941) is a Syrian writer, member of the Association for Research and Studies, and librarian of the Arab Broadcasting Union. Her books include Juman in Proverbs, a comparative historical study, and the short story collection Sinbad in a Deferred Journey.

== Early life and education ==
Born in Jableh in 1941, Taha lived most of her life in Syria, where she took a degree in Arabic from Damascus University.

== Career ==
Her books include: Seduction of Memories; the novel When the Doors Speak, about the Arab Writers Union in the Syrian capital Damascus; and Encyclopedia of Arab Folk Proverbs: A Comparative Historical Study; Encyclopedia of Masterpieces in Judgment and Proverbs.

== Works ==
- The seduction of memories from travel literature

=== Novels ===
- When the Doors Speak (Arabic: عندما تتكلم الأبواب)

=== Non-fiction ===
- Encyclopedia of Arabic Folk Proverbs: A Comparative Historical Study
- Encyclopedia of masterpieces in governance and proverbs

=== Short story collections ===
- Sinbad in a Deferred Journey (Arabic: سندباد في رحلة مؤجلة: قصص قصيرة)
