= Jumna (ship) =

British full-rigged ship, 1867–1899

History

United Kingdom
- Name: Jumna
- Namesake: Jamuna
- Owner: Nourse Line
- Operator: 1867: James Nourse; 1897: Charles Hampton
- Port of registry: London
- Builder: William Pile, Sunderland
- Launched: 17 August 1867
- Identification: UK official number 56838; code letters HTNS
- Fate: Sold

Norway
- Owner: NP Hoyer
- Port of registry: Skien
- Acquired: 1898
- Fate: Missing February 1899

General characteristics
- Type: iron-hulled sailing ship
- Tonnage: 1,048 GRT
- Length: 208.6 ft (63.6 m)
- Beam: 34.1 ft (10.4 m)
- Depth: 20.1 ft (6.1 m)
- Sail plan: full-rigged ship

Jumna was a 1,048 GRT iron-hulled full-rigged ship that was built in England in 1867 and went missing in the Atlantic Ocean in 1899. For most of her career she was in the fleet of James Nourse.

Jumna was named after the Jamuna river, a tributary of the Ganges. This was the first of three ships in the Nourse Line fleet to be called Jumna. The second Jumna was a steamship that was built in 1929 and sunk by a German cruiser in 1940. The third was a motor ship that was built in 1962, renamed in 1972 and scrapped in 1985.

== Building and identification ==
William Pile of Sunderland built Jumna, launching her on 17 August 1867. She was 208.6 ft (63.6 m) long, her beam was 34.1 ft (10.4 m) and her depth was 20.1 ft (6.1 m).

Jumna's UK official number was 56838 and she was registered in London. By 1884 her code letters were HTNS.

== Voyages ==
Jumna carried indentured labourers from India to other British Empire territories, which was a Nourse Line speciality.

Details of some of these voyages are as follows:

Destination	Date of Arrival	Number of Passengers	Deaths During Voyage
Trinidad	10 February 1874	430	17
Trinidad	28 February 1880	435	3
Trinidad	10 January 1889	456	6
Fiji	27 June 1891	447	n/a
Fiji	23 May 1893	310	n/a

The 310 labourers she carried to Fiji in 1893 was the smallest number of passengers carried by any ship transporting Indian indentured labourers to Fiji.

On 22 December 1893 Jumna transported 487 indentured labourers from the Volga (which had sunk) to Jamaica. In 1883 she repatriated 95 labourers back to India from Saint Lucia and another 137 in August 1892.

== Fate ==
In 1898 NP Hoyer bought Jumna and registered her in Skien in Norway. On 21 February 1899 she left Greenock in Scotland laden with coal for Montevideo in Uruguay. She was last seen passing Rathlin Island in the North Channel. She was never seen again, and in due course was posted missing.

== Notable passengers ==
- Totaram Sanadhya arrived in Fiji on 23 May 1893

== See also ==
- Indian Indenture Ships to Fiji
- Indian indenture system

== Bibliography ==
- Lubbock, Basil (1955). Coolie Ships and Oil Sailors. Glasgow: Brown, Son & Ferguson. ISBN 0-85174-111-8.
