= Joumana Haddad =

Lebanese poet, journalist and activist (born 1970)

- جمانة حداد
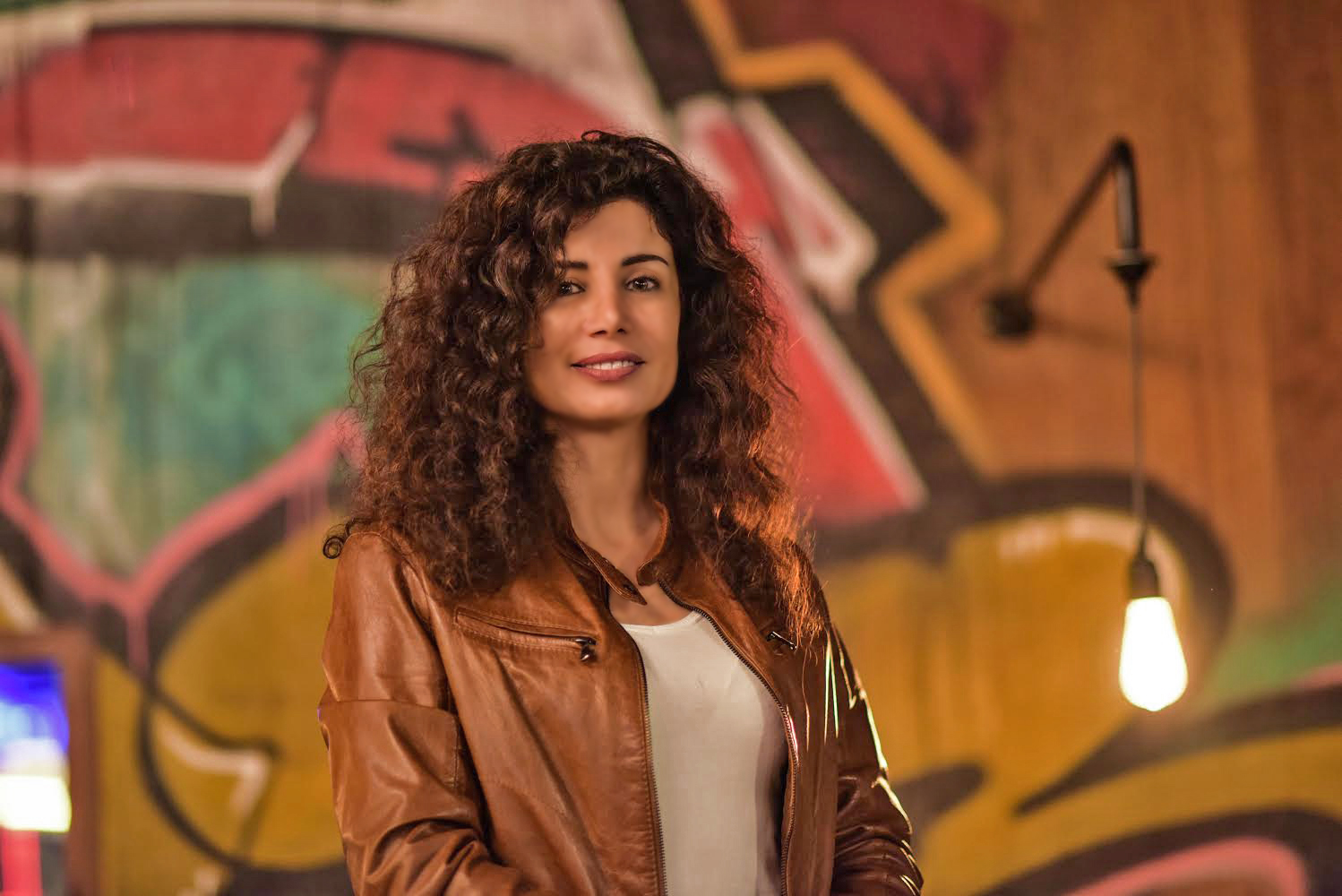
- Joumana Haddad in Beirut, 2018
- Born: December 6, 1970 (age 55)
- Occupations: Journalist; author; public speaker; human rights activist
- Awards: Social Economic Award (2018); Career Poetry Prize (2014); Cutuli Prize (2012); Rodolfo Gentili Prize (2010); Blue Metropolis Al Majidi Ibn Dhaher Arab Literary Prize (2010)

Joumana Haddad (Arabic: جمانة حداد; née Salloum; born December 6, 1970, in Beirut) is a Lebanese author, public speaker, journalist and human rights activist. She has been selected as one of the world’s 100 most powerful Arab women by Arabian Business Magazine for her cultural and social activism. In 2021, she was on Apolitical's list of 100 most influential people in Gender Policy. She is founder of Jasad, a quarterly Arabic-language magazine specialized in the arts and literature of the body (2009–2011). Haddad launched a new TV show in November 2018 on Alhurra highlighting the topics of free expression and critical thinking. In September 2019, she founded a youth centered NGO in Beirut called the Joumana Haddad Freedoms Center. In February 2020, in partnership with the Institut Français in Lebanon, she launched the first International Feminisms Festival in the Middle East with a group of local and international co-organizers.

== Career ==
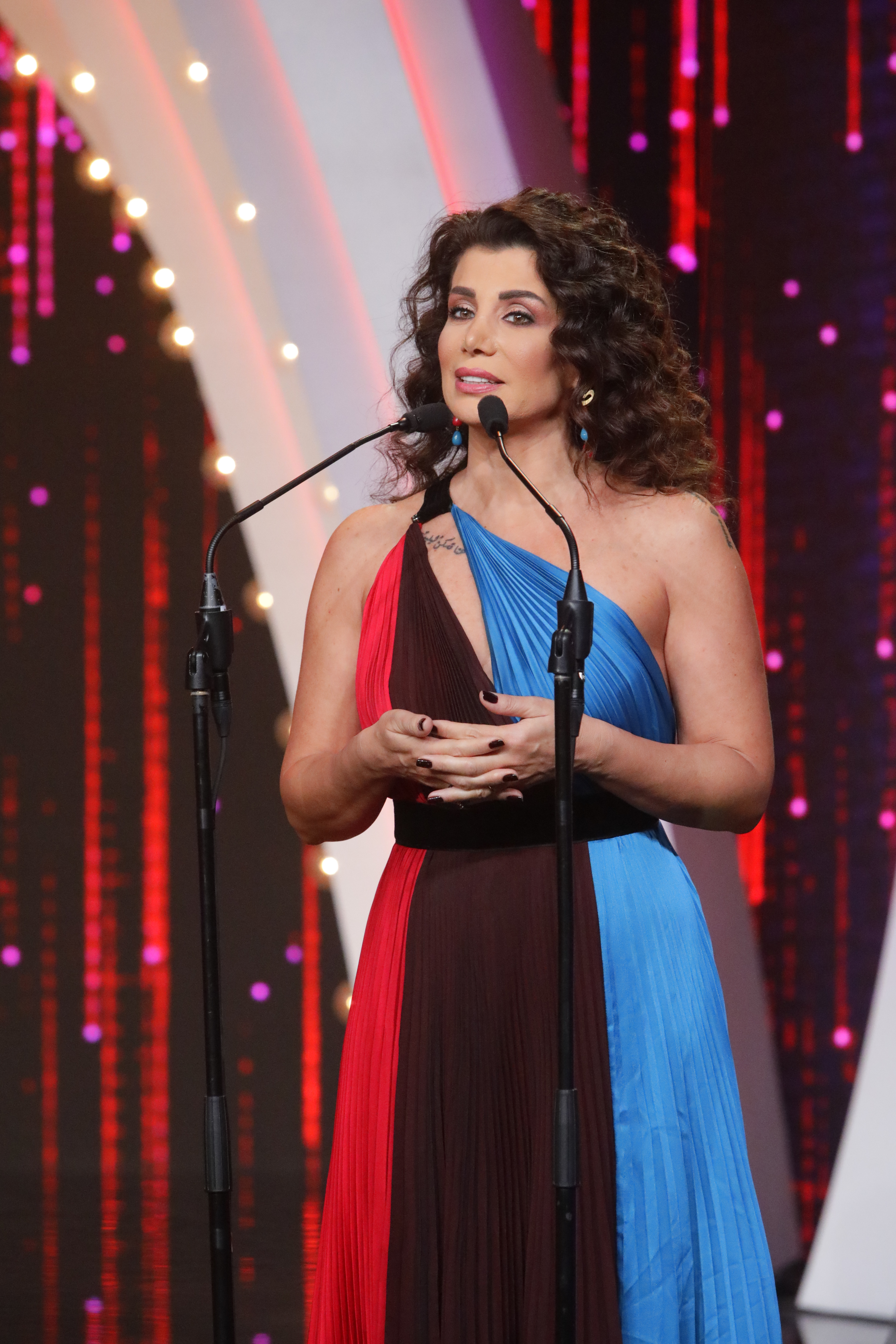
Joumana Haddad at one of her events Beirut 2018

Joumana Haddad started working at An-Nahar newspaper in 1997, serving as the cultural editor 2005-2017.

In the course of her career as a cultural journalist she has interviewed many international authors, such as Umberto Eco, Paul Auster, Jose Saramago, Peter Handke, Elfriede Jelinek and others.

Between 2007 and 2011, she was the administrator of the International Prize for Arabic Fiction.

In 2009, she founded her magazine, Jasad, specialized in the culture and politics of the body in the Arab world.

Between 2012 and 2016, she taught creative writing and Arabic modern poetry at the Lebanese American University in Beirut.

In 2018 she started hosting a new TV show on Alhurra highlighting the topics of free expression and critical thinking.

She also has a weekly radio podcast on Radio Monte Carlo International, and she writes regularly for several international newspapers and magazines.

Haddad speaks seven languages, and has published 15 books so far. Most of her works of fiction, non-fiction, theater and poetry have been translated into numerous languages.

== Awards and honors ==
In 2006, Joumana Haddad received the Arab Press Prize.

In October 2009, she was chosen as one of the 39 most interesting Arab writers under 39.

In November 2009, she won the International Prize North South for poetry, of the Pescarabruzzo Foundation in Italy. The winner of the novel prize was Austrian writer Peter Handke.

In February 2010, she won the Blue Metropolis Al Majidi Ibn Dhaher Arab Literary Prize.

In August 2010, she received the Rodolfo Gentili Prize in Porto Recanati, Italy.

In November 2012, she received the Cutuli Prize for journalism in Catania, Italy.

In July 2013, she was appointed honorary ambassador for culture and human rights for the city of Naples in the Mediterranean by the mayor of Naples Luigi de Magistris.

In February 2014, she was awarded the "Career Poetry Prize" by the Archicultura Foundation in Acqui Terme, Italy.

In December 2018, Haddad won the Social Economic Award for the category of Social Media Influencer.

== Other ventures ==
Haddad's magazine Jasad was the feature of a 2013 film by Amanda Homsi-Ottosson, Jasad & The Queen of Contradictions, a Women Make Movies release.

In 2009, Haddad herself co-wrote and acted in a movie by Lebanese filmmaker Jocelyne Saab ("What's going on?").

Haddad ran for the Lebanese parliamentary elections on May 6, 2018. After she was announced a winner on the night of the elections by local TV news channels, the authorities declared that she had actually lost on the morning of the following day, so there was a big demonstration in front of the Ministry of Interior on the afternoon of May 7 to protest the results and ask for a recount. Haddad went on to submit an appeal to the Constitutional Council on June 7 with the prominent lawyer Melhem Khalaf, but her case was supported by only three out of the ten members of the Council, so her appeal for a recount was revoked.

Haddad was the first woman to edit the cultural pages of An-Nahar and to publish a magazine that discusses controversial and taboo topics in the middle east such as virginity, polygamy, violence against women and the LGBTQ community, in Arabic and in a conservative society. She was also the first Arab woman to be openly atheist. She received a lot of hate, rape and death threats.

== Bibliography ==
=== Original books in Arabic ===
- Da'awa ila asha'a serri, poetry, (1998)
- Two hands to the abyss, poetry, (2000)
- I did not sin enough, selected poems, (2003)
- Awdat Lilit, poetry, (2004)
- The panther hidden at the base of her shoulders, selected poems, (2006)
- In the company of the fire thieves, Conversations with international writers, (2006)
- Death will come and it will have your eyes, Anthology of 150 poets who committed suicide, (2007)
- Bad habits, selected poems, (2007)
- Mirrors of the passers by, poetry, (2008)
- Kitab el Jeem, poetry, (2012)
- Cages, theater, (2014)
- Bint El Khyatta, novel, (2018)

=== Original books in English ===
- Madinah, city stories from the Middle East, anthology, 2008, "Comma Press", Manchester, UK.
- I Killed Scheherazade, Essay, 2010, "Saqi Books", London, UK. The book has been translated to French, Italian, Spanish, Danish, Portuguese, German, Dutch, Croatian, Norwegian, Romanian and Arabic.
- Superman is an Arab, Essay, 2012, "Westbourne Press", London, UK. The book has been translated to French, Italian, Spanish, Croatian and Arabic.
- The Third Sex, Essay, 2015, "Nawfal", Beirut, Lebanon.
- The Book of Queens, novel, 2022, Interlink Books, Northampton, Massachusetts.

=== Original books in Italian ===
- Le sette vite di Luca, Children's literature, 2011, Mondadori Junior, Milan, Italy.

=== Original books in Spanish ===
- Allí donde el río se incendia, Antología poética, 2005, Ediciones De Aquí, Málaga, Espana, 2006, Fundación Editorial El Perro y la Rana, Caracas, Venezuela.

=== Original books in French ===
- Le temps d'un rêve, Poésie, (1995)
- Les amants ne devraient porter que des mocassins, littérature érotique, 2010, Editions Humus.

=== Selection of translations into other languages ===
- Damit ich abreisen kann, 2005, Lisan Verlag, Basel, Switzerland.
- Cuando me hice fruta, 2006, Monte Ávila Editores, Caracas, Venezuela.
- El retorno de Lilith, 2007, Editorial Praxis, Mexico, Mexico/ 2010, Diputacion Provincial de Malaga, Mar Remoto, Spain.
- Le retour de Lilith, 2007, Editions L’Inventaire, Paris, France/ 2011, Editions Actes Sud, Paris, France.
- Invitation to a Secret Feast, poetry, 2008, Tupelo Press, Vermont, USA.
- Liliths Wiederkehr, 2008, Verlag Hans Schiler, Berlin, Germany.
- Adrenalina, 2009, "Edizioni del Leone", Venice, Italy.
- Il ritorno di Lilith, 2010, "Edizioni l'Asino d'Oro", Rome, Italy.
- Lilits återkomst, 2010, Bokförlaget Tranan, Stockholm, Sweden.
- Espejos de las fugaces, 2010, "Vaso Roto ediciones", Mexico.
- Miroirs des passantes dans le songe, 2010, « Al Dante », Paris, France.
- Las siete vidas de Luca, Literatura infantil, 2011, Vaso Roto, México, México.
- Los amantes deberían llevar solo mocasines, Literatura erótica, 2011, Vaso Roto, México, México.
- Am ucis-o pe Seherezada, Philobia, 2012, Bucharest, Romania

== Personal life ==
Joumana was born in Beirut in 1970 into a conservative Christian family. She is of Armenian extraction from her maternal grandmother's side, and Syriac Catholic (ethnic Assyrian) from her maternal grandfather's side In 1975 the civil war started. She was surrounded by war and fear at a very young age. At 20, she married her first husband and gave birth to her first son one year later. She divorced her first husband and later in her life got married again to her second husband who was a poet. They also got divorced, after 10 years. Haddad lives in Beirut and has two sons.

== Opinions ==
Haddad is an atheist and a critic of organised religion.

She is a feminist. In an interview she states that feminism is not only a woman's fight, but that everyone should fight for equality and a more dignified world for all human beings. She believes that not only some men are holding back women but also women themselves can sometimes be the biggest obstacle to achieve equality because of internalized misogyny and the way they have been brainwashed to have no self confidence. She is an activist for equality, LGBTQ+ rights, individual freedoms and secularism.

== See also ==
- Lina Ben Mhenni
- Beirut
