= HMS Jumna (1848) =

Ship lost in 1881

Coordinates: 31°30′S 112°00′E

History

United Kingdom
- Name: HMS Jumna
- Builder: Bombay Dockyard
- Launched: 7 March 1848
- Fate: Sold in 1862

United Kingdom
- Name: Jumna
- Owner: J. Wills & Son
- Fate: Lost between Hobart and Fremantle in 1881

General characteristics
- Type: Helena-class brig
- Length: 111 feet (34 m)
- Beam: 34.77 feet (10.60 m)
- Draught: 15.42 feet (4.70 m)

HMS Jumna was a Helena-class brig of the Royal Navy, built at the Bombay Dockyard, initially intended to be named HMS Zebra and launched on 7 March 1848 as Jumna. She was paid off and sold 25 June 1862.

== Fate ==
Jumna arrived at Hobart, Tasmania on 4 November 1881 from Port Louis, Mauritius, with a cargo of sugar and unable to obtain a charter, took in ballast, and left for Fremantle, Western Australia on 19 November and was never seen again.

The Australian National Shipwreck Database reports that she was lost "between Ports, possibly South Fremantle". She carried a crew of four able seamen and 16 apprentices.
