= Dubai Design Week =

Annual arts event

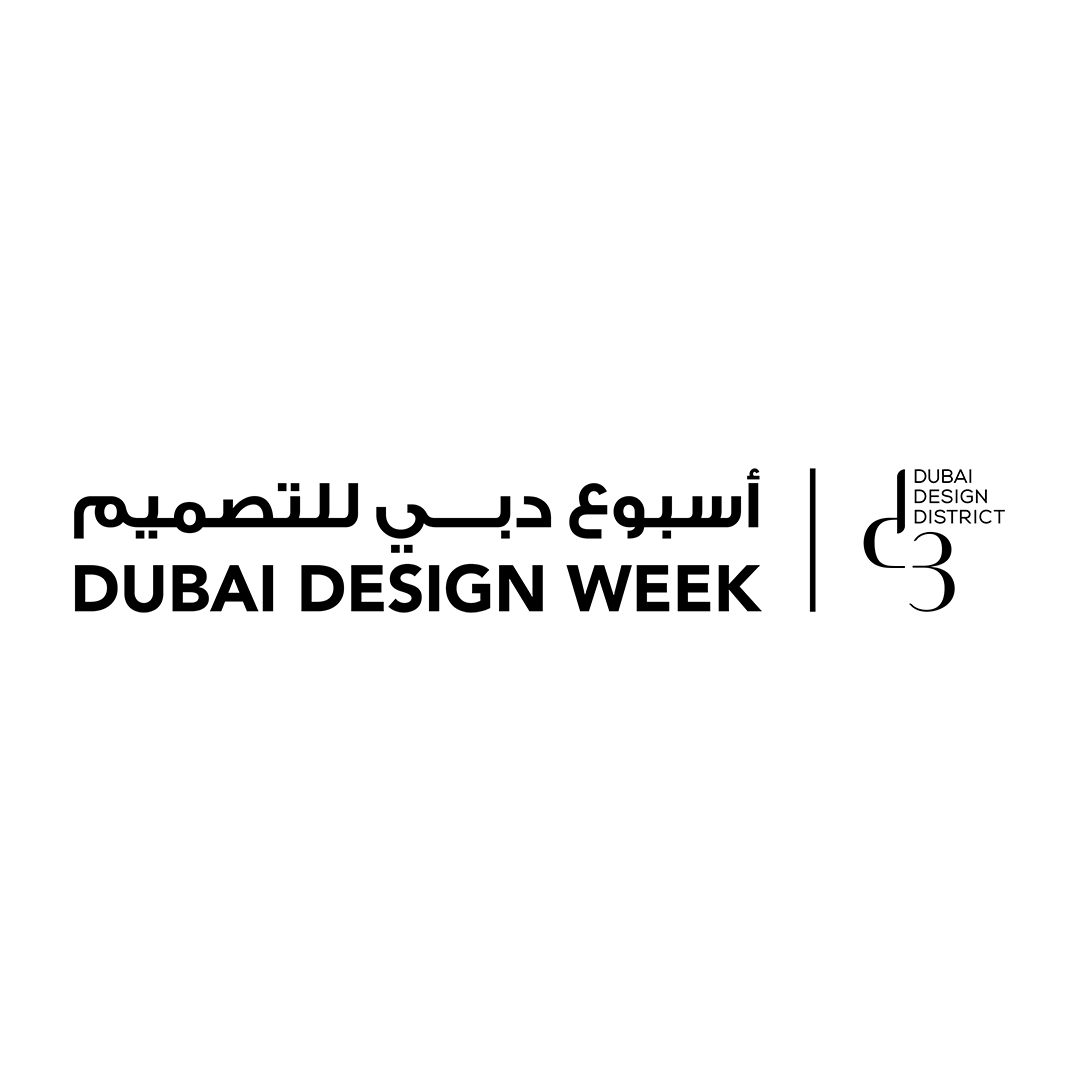
- Genre: Design Festival
- Frequency: Annually
- Locations: Dubai, United Arab Emirates
- Inaugurated: 2015
- Previous event: November 2022
- Next event: November 2023
- Attendance: +130,000 in 2022
- Area: Dubai
- Patron: Her Highness Sheikha Latifa Bint Mohammed Bin Rashid Al Maktoum
- Organiser: Art Dubai Group, supported by Dubai Design District (d3) and Dubai Culture & Arts Authority (Dubai Culture)
- Website: dubaidesignweek.ae

Dubai Design Week is an annual six-day event held to celebrate and promote design and creativity in Dubai, United Arab Emirates. The first Dubai Design Week took place in 2015, and is held annually at venues across the city, with Dubai Design District being the main hub. With an extensive programme of free-to-attend exhibitions, talks, workshops, the 2022 festival attracted over 130,000 visitors and as such it is considered the largest creative festival in the Middle East.

== Overview ==
Dubai Design Week is owned and managed by the Art Dubai Group (ADG). The event is under the patronage of Sheikha Latifa bint Mohammed bin Rashid Al Maktoum, staged with Dubai Design District, and supported by Dubai Culture and Arts Authority.

Skills and artforms included in the event are architecture, product and furniture design, interior design, jewelry, industrial design, service design, technology, culture, art, and more.

Dubai Design Week takes place across the city and at its main hub; Dubai Design District (d3), with over 360 partner organisations.

Key components of Dubai Design Week include a fair for contemporary design, Downtown Design; Abwab, an interactive platform for creative talent from the Middle East, North Africa and South Asia; the Urban Commissions design competition and the Design market alongside outdoor installations, exhibitions, an extensive, hybrid talks and workshops programme.

=== Downtown Design ===
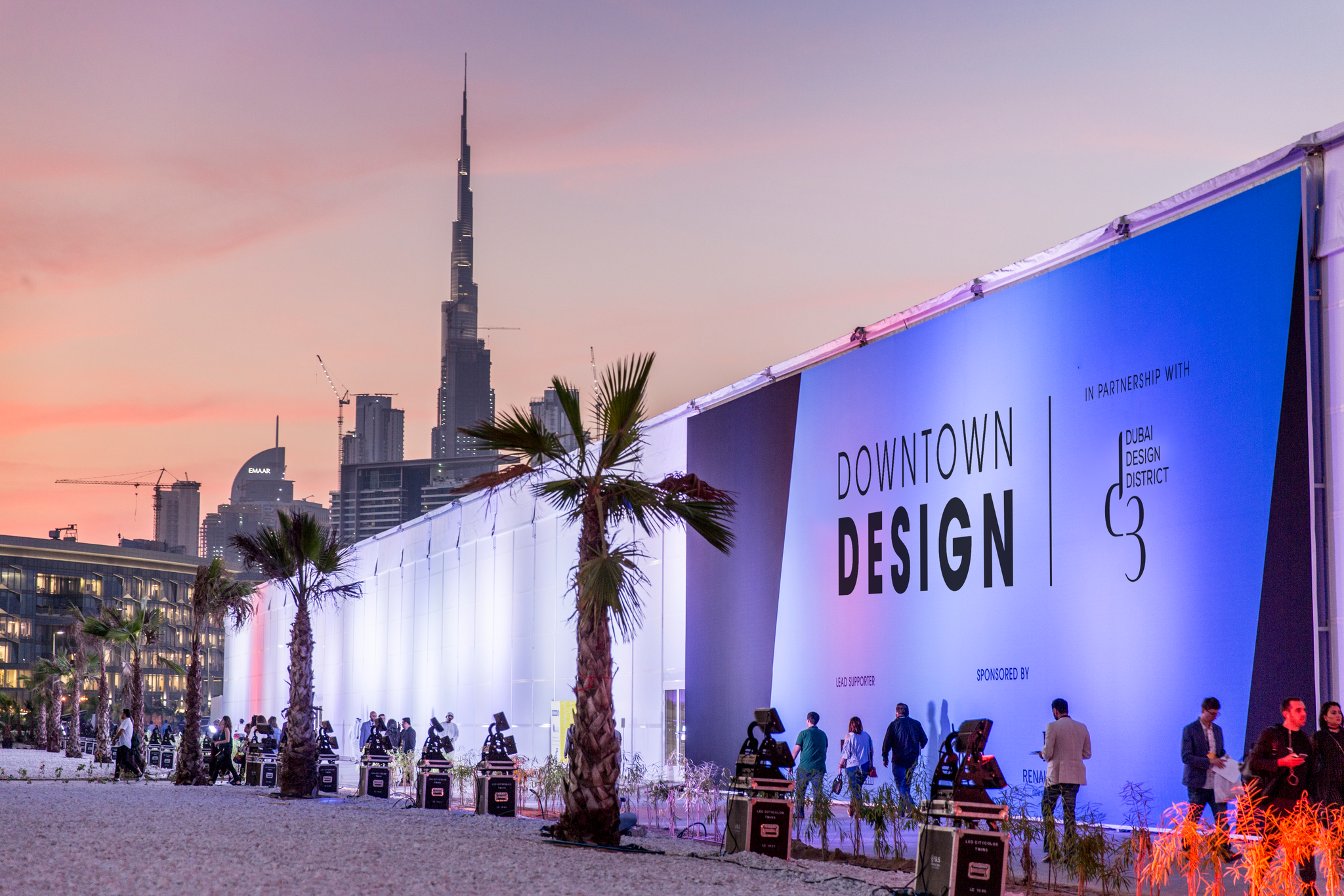
Downtown Design takes place at the Waterfront Terrace of Dubai Design District.

As the commercial centrepiece of Dubai Design Week – Downtown Design is a design trade fair for contemporary design in the Middle East, showcasing a variety of commercial designs from various industries. It was originally launched in 2013 prior to Dubai Design Week but is now held annually during the week-long festival.

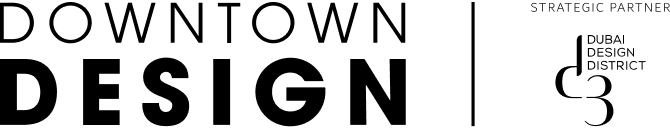
Downtown Design logo

The fair exhibits product launches and latest collections from over 350 international and regional brands, designers and manufacturers alongside Downtown Editions, the fair's boutique showcase for limited-edition design with a spotlight on individual designers and collectives. The fair also hosts an extensive talks and masterclasses programme, which includes a series of industry talks, panel discussions and workshops, allowing visitors to gain valuable insight into the region's rapidly evolving design industry, design innovation and market changes.

=== Abwab ===
Abwab translates as ‘doors’ in Arabic. It is Dubai Design Week's key event for highlighting regional design talent from the Middle East, North Africa and South Asia. A total of 180 designers have participated in Abwab from 2015 to 2020.
