= Dubai Design District =

Planned community in Dubai

Dubai Design District (d3)
- Type: Mixed use
- Industry: Real estate
- Founded: 2013
- Headquarters: Hai d3, Dubai, UAE
- Area served: Business Bay, Trade Centre 2
- Owner: Tecom Investments
- Website: www.dubaidesigndistrict.com

Dubai Design District (d3) is a planned community in Dubai dedicated to the design, fashion, and culture community, including startups, entrepreneurs, and international design, luxury, and fashion brands. It was established in 2013. It is a TECOM Group freezone business park consisting of three phases, the first of which is 11 building offices, completed in 2016.

The district hosts some regional and international brands and design houses such as Adidas, Nike, and Foster + Partners. It comprises office spaces, retail boutiques, workshops, hotels, residential areas, and restaurants and cafes.

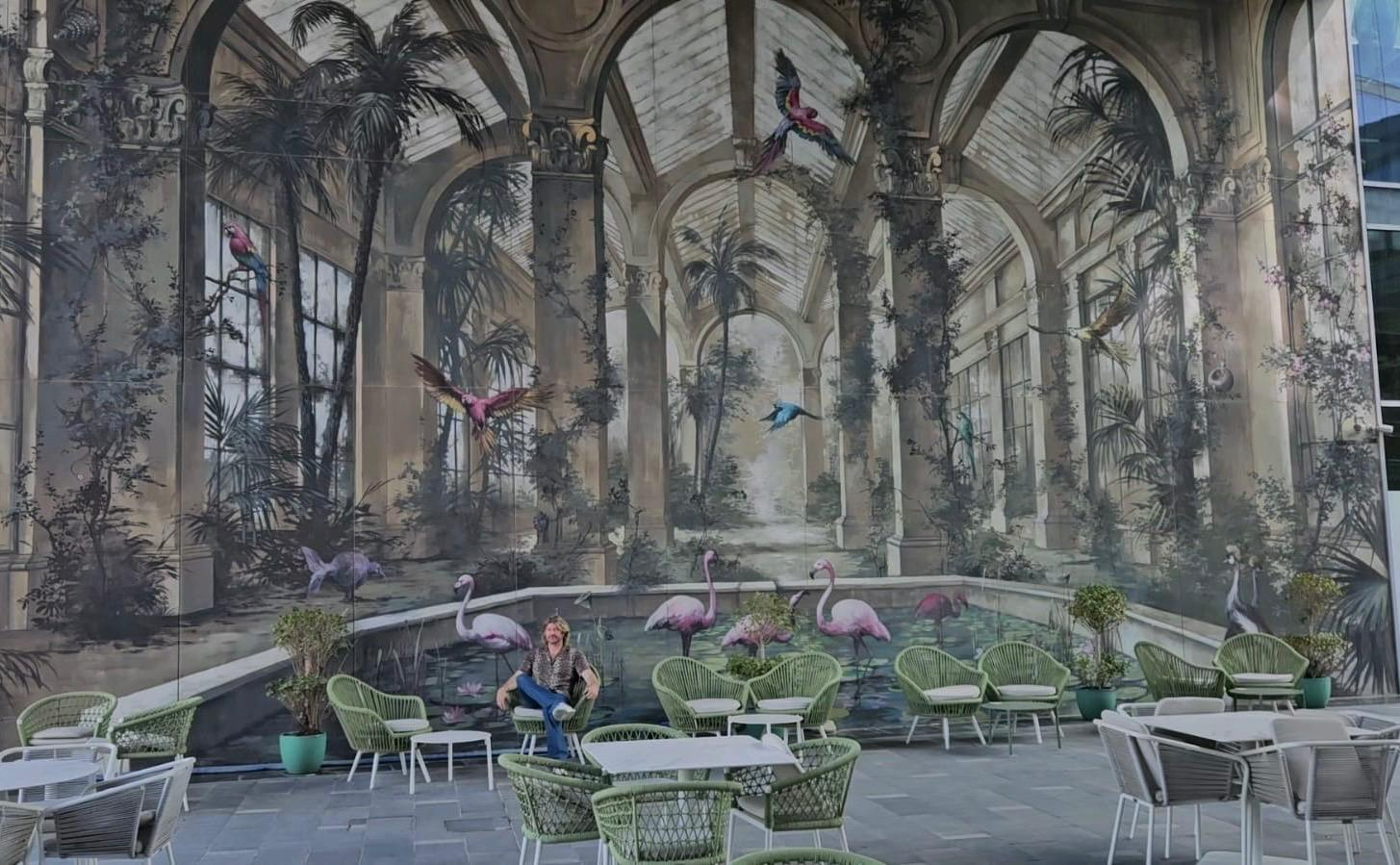
Mural inside the Dubai Design District by Italian artist Gio Bressana (2025)

The district allows professionals and freelancers who do not hold UAE citizenship to obtain a license from the free zone and authorizes them to have sole ownership of their projects. Dubai Design District also holds the Dubai Design Week in November.

d3 is located close to Mohammed bin Rashid City and adjacent to Dubai's Business Bay. The district is situated beside Dubai Creek, and behind Burj Khalifa and Dubai Mall. Amina Al Rustimani was the CEO of the development company behind d3.

In 2020, a smart police station was opened in the district to provide security services to the public around the clock. The station offers around 46 different services under four categories: security, traffic, community, and certificates.

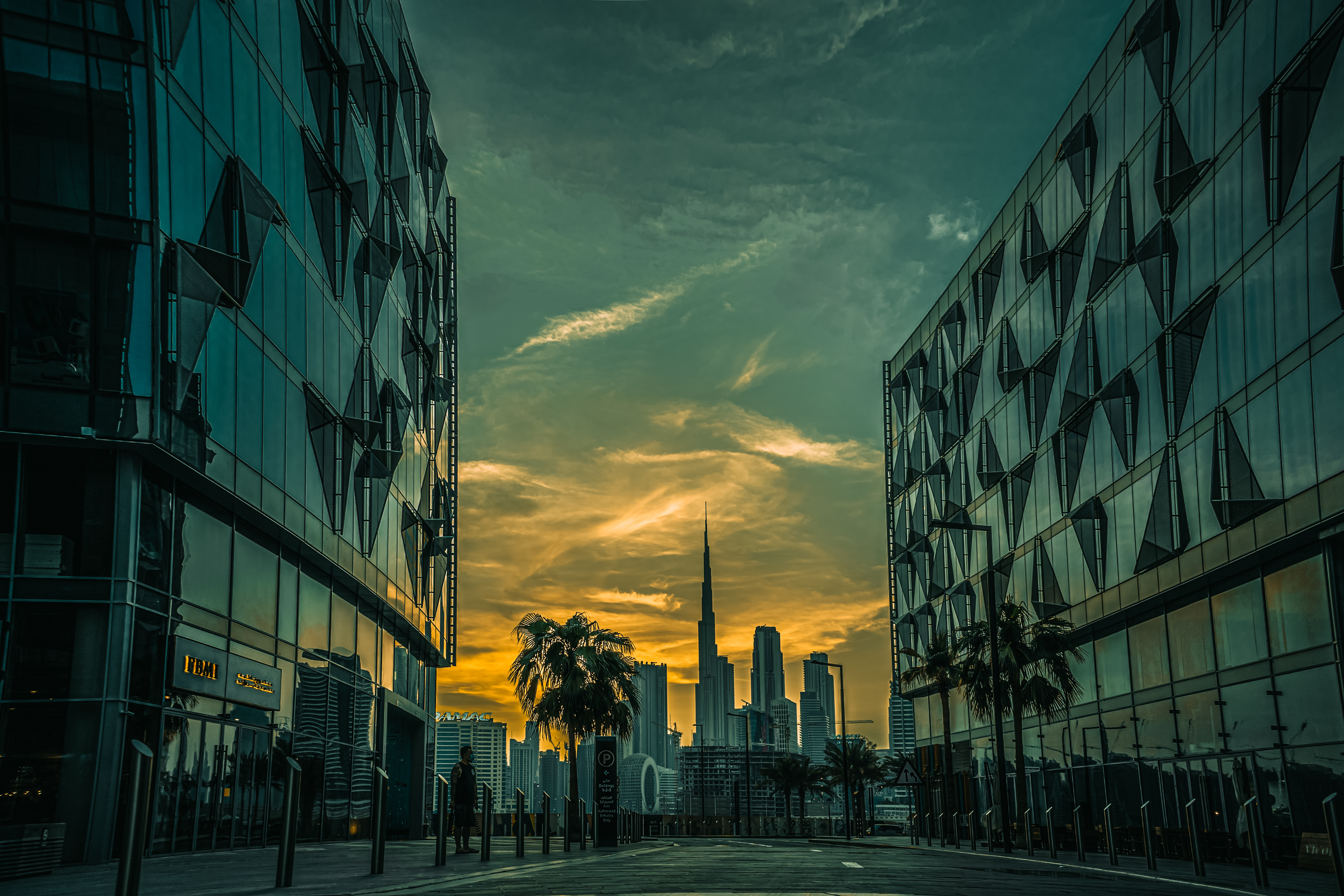
Dubai Design District View of Burj Khalifa

In 2024, a temporary stadium in Dubai Design District hosted 2024 FIFA Beach Soccer World Cup from the 15th to the 25th of February 2024.

== Phases ==
The development of d3 has been separated into three phases.

=== Phase 1 ===
Phase 1 was completed in 2015, with 1.2m sq. ft. of offices, studios, ateliers, showrooms, and over 200,000 sq. ft. of retail space.

It contains 11 buildings with an estimated 100 retail units and 1,000 office units.

=== Phase 2 ===
Phase 2 will see the construction of the creative community which will house a range of design industry workshops, studios, and showrooms. This phase is due for completion in 2019. The creative community is being designed by Foster and Partners.

=== Phase 3 ===
The third phase of the development will focus on d3's 2 km long Creek side promenade which will feature hotels, international and regional food and beverage offerings with a wide selection of hospitality and leisure facilities. This phase is due for completion in 2018.

== See also ==
- Dubai Design Week
