= Al Fardan Exchange (Dubai Metro) =

Metro station in Dubai, United Arab Emirates

Coordinates: 25.08892°N 55.15818°E

Al Fardan Exchange الفردان للصرافة

General information
- Location: Sheikh Zayed Road; Emirates Golf Club, Al Thanyah Third; Dubai, United Arab Emirates
- System: Metro Station
- Line: Red Line
- Platforms: 2 island platforms
- Tracks: 3
- Connections: RTA Dubai: 83 Al Ghubaiba Bus Stn - Al Fardan Exchange MS; F58 DIC MS - Al Fardan Exchange MS

Construction
- Accessible: yes

Other information
- Station code: 35
- Fare zone: 2

History
- Opened: October 15, 2010
- Former names: Nakheel, Al Khail

Services
Preceding station	Dubai Metro	Following station
Sobha Realty towards Expo 2020 or Life Pharmacy	Red Line	Dubai Internet City towards Centrepoint
Location

Al Fardan Exchange (Arabic: الفردان للصرافة, Arabic pronunciation: [al‿fardaːn lisˤ‿sˤi.raːfa]; formerly Nakheel and Al Khail) is a rapid transit station on the Red Line of the Dubai Metro in Dubai, UAE. It opened on 15 October 2010 along with four other intermediate stations on the Red Line, as Nakheel. It was renamed to Al Khail on November 24, 2020. It was again renamed to Al Fardan Exchange on March 19, 2025.

== Location ==
Al Fardan Exchange Station in Dubai seen from service road next to Sheikh Zayed Road

Al Fardan Exchange station is located slightly under 20 kilometres (12 mi) to the southwest of Downtown Dubai, between Interchanges 4 and 5 of Sheikh Zayed Road. It is the closest stop on the Dubai Metro to the American University of Dubai and Dubai Media City to the west and the Emirates Golf Club to the east.

== Station layout ==
Al Fardan Exchange station rests on a viaduct paralleling the eastern side of Sheikh Zayed Road. It is categorised as a type 3 elevated station, as it has three tracks, the third being used to hold trains when necessary. The station has an elevated concourse, with pedestrian access aided by aerial walkways to either side of the road.

During peak hours, the middle track acts as a terminus for alternating trains from centrepoint. Passengers travelling towards Expo 2020 or Life Pharmacy transfer at this station.

G	Street level	Exit/ Entrance
L1	Mezzanine	Fare control, station agent, Ticket/token, shops
L2	Platform 2 Southbound	Towards ← Life Pharmacy / Expo 2020; Next station: Sobha Realty; Passengers may alight at the next station for Dubai Tram
L2	Island platform | P2 Doors will open on the left | P3 Doors will open on both sides
L2	Platform 3 Northbound	Towards → Centrepoint; Next station: Dubai Internet City
L2	Island platform | P1 Doors will open on the left | P3 Doors will open on both sides
L2	Platform 1 Northbound	Towards → Centrepoint; Next station: Dubai Internet City
