= Purple Line (Dubai Metro) =

Proposed line of Dubai Metro

- Map of Dubai Metro with the proposed Purple Line in December 2011.

Overview
- Status: Proposed
- Owner: Roads and Transport Authority (Dubai)
- Locale: Dubai, United Arab Emirates
- Termini: Dubai International Airport, along Al Khail Road; Al Maktoum International Airport
- Stations: 8

Service
- Type: Rapid transit
- System: Dubai Metro
- Operator(s): Serco

Technical
- Line length: 49 kilometers (30 mi)
- Track gauge: 4 ft 8 1/2 in (1,435 mm)
- Electrification: Third rail
- Operating speed: 110 km/h (68 mph)

The Purple Line is a proposed line of the Dubai Metro network in Dubai, United Arab Emirates. The proposed line is to extend from Dubai International Airport to Al Maktoum International Airport, along Al Khail Road. The Purple Line proposal contains eight stations along its route. The line was first proposed in 2007.

== Statistics ==
The Purple line will be 49 kilometres (30 mi) long and trains on this line will travel at an average speed of 110 kilometres per hour (68 mph).

== See also ==
- Green Line (Dubai Metro)
- Red Line (Dubai Metro)
- Blue Line (Dubai Metro)
