= Dubai Internet City (Dubai Metro) =

Metro station in Dubai, UAE

Dubai Internet City مدينة دبي للانترنت

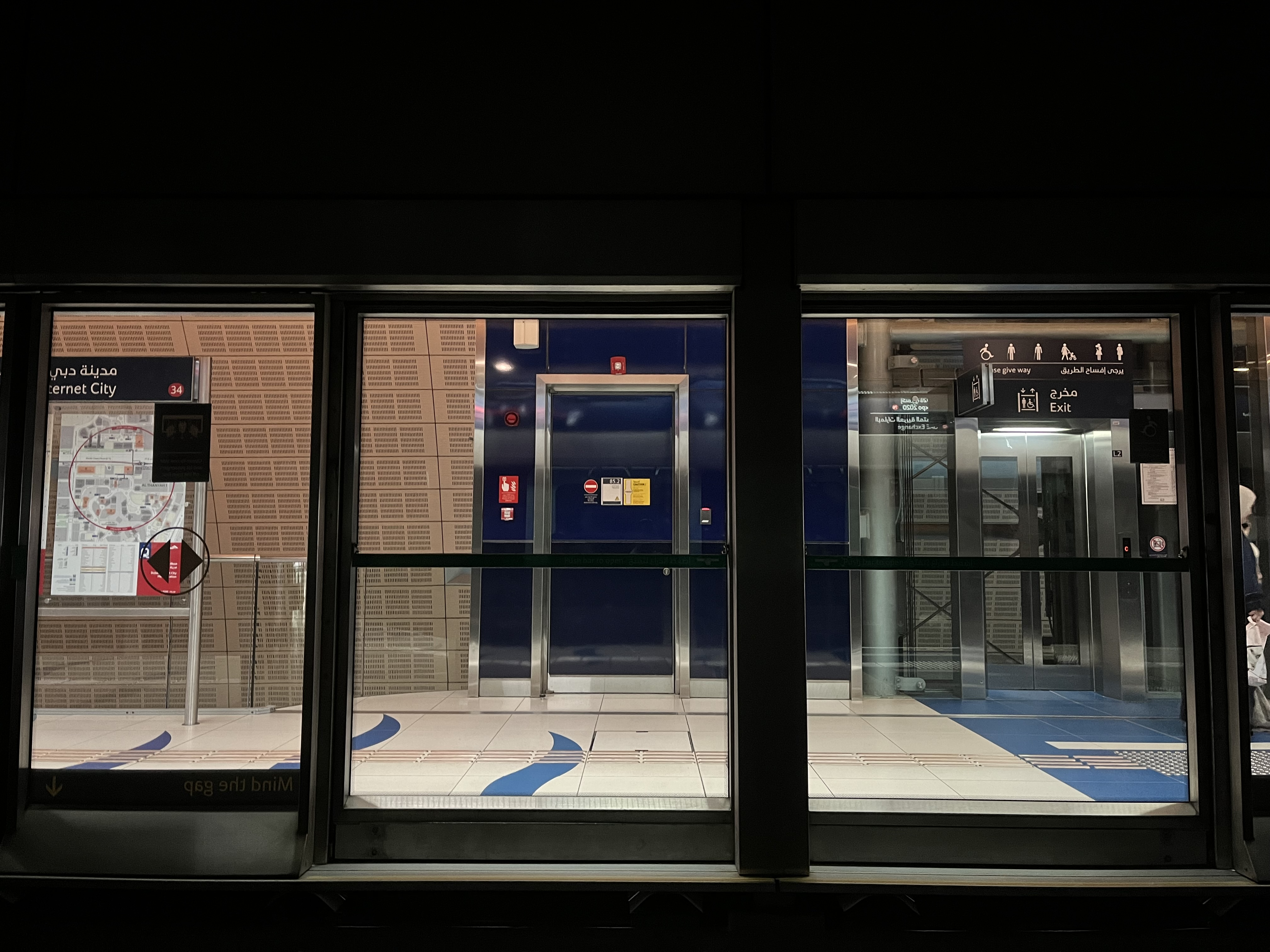

General information
- Location: Sheikh Zayed Road; Barsha Heights, Al Thanyah First, Dubai; UAE
- Coordinates: 25.1022°N 55.1739°E
- System: Metro Station
- Operator: Dubai Metro
- Line: Red Line
- Platforms: 2
- Tracks: 2
- Connections: RTA Dubai: 88 Deira City Center Bus Stn - Dubai Internet City MS; F31 Dubai Internet City MS - The Meadows East; F34 DIC MS - Dubai Production City; F35 Mall Of Emirates Bus Stn - The Greens; F59 DIC MS - Dubai Knowledge Village

Other information
- Station code: 34
- Fare zone: 2

History
- Opened: April 30, 2010; May 19, 2024
- Closed: April 16, 2024

Services
Preceding station	Dubai Metro	Following station
Al Fardan Exchange towards Expo 2020 or Life Pharmacy	Red Line	InsuranceMarket towards Centrepoint
Location

Dubai Internet City (Arabic: مدينة دبي للانترنت) is a rapid transit station on the Red Line of the Dubai Metro in Dubai, UAE, serving Barsha Heights and surrounding areas. The station is named after the nearby Dubai Internet City (DIC).

The station opened as part of the Red Line on 30 April 2010. It is close to the major junction with Hessa Street on the Sheikh Zayed Road. Nearby are the American School of Dubai, Dubai American Academy, and the International School of Choueifat. As well as Barsha Heights, surrounding neighbourhoods include the eponymous Dubai Internet City itself, Al Sufouh, Dubai Knowledge Park, Al Hawaii Residence, and Flamingo Villas. The station is close to a number of bus routes. The Palm Jumeirah Monorail serving Palm Jumeirah is close to the station and there are plans to link this to the Red Line. The station also connects directly with The One Tower.

The station closed due to flooding on 16 April 2024, and was reopened 2 days later as a result of maintenance checks in the station.

== Station Layout ==
G	Street level	Exit/Entrance
L1	Concourse	Automatic Fare Collection gates, station agent, crossover
L2	Side platform | Doors will open on the right
L2	Platform 2 Southbound	Towards ← Life Pharmacy / Expo 2020; Next Station: Al Fardan Exchange
L2	Platform 1 Northbound	Towards → Centrepoint; Next Station: Insurance Market
L2	Side platform | Doors will open on the right
