= Financial Centre (Dubai Metro) =

Metro station in Dubai, UAE

Financial Centre المركز المالي

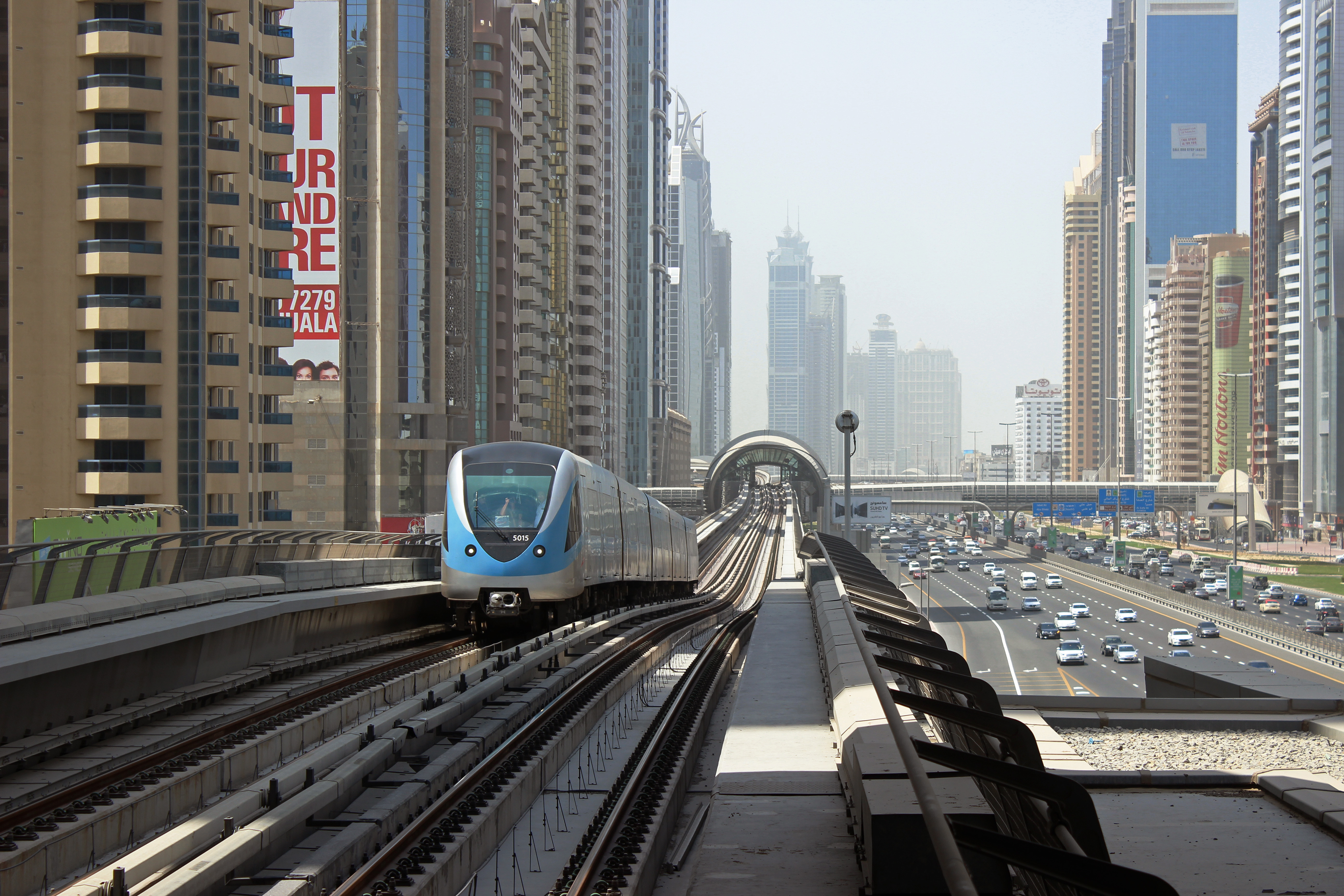
- View along the Red Line to the station

General information
- Location: Sheikh Zayed Road; Dubai International Financial Centre, Trade Centre 2, Dubai; UAE
- Coordinates: 25.2108°N 55.2755°E
- System: Metro Station
- Line: Red Line
- Platforms: 2 side platforms
- Tracks: 2
- Connections: RTA Dubai: F11 Financial Center MS - Al Satwa

Construction
- Accessible: yes

Other information
- Station code: 24
- Fare zone: 6

History
- Opened: September 9, 2009

Services
Preceding station	Dubai Metro	Following station
Burj Khalifa/Dubai Mall towards Expo 2020 or Life Pharmacy	Red Line	Emirates Towers towards Centrepoint
Location

Financial Centre (Arabic: المركز المالي, Arabic pronunciation: [alˈmarkaz almaːliː]) is a rapid transit station on the Red Line of the Dubai Metro in Dubai, UAE.

== History ==
Financial Centre station opened on 9 September 2009 as part of the initial stretch of the Red Line, with trains running between Rashidiya and Nakheel Harbour and Tower. Other stations on the Red Line opened progressively over 2010 and 2011.

From 6 March 2023 to 12 March 2023, the station hosted the Dubai Metro Music Festival.

== Location ==
Located southwest of the historic centre of Dubai, Financial Centre station lies between Bur Dubai and many of the city's larger new developments. To the east is the Dubai International Financial Centre (DIFC), after which the station is named. Nearby residential buildings include The Index and the Park Towers at DIFC, as well as numerous hotels.

== Station layout ==
Like many other stations on the Red Line, Financial Centre lies on a viaduct paralleling the eastern side of Sheikh Zayed Road. It is classified as a type 2 station, indicating a setup with an elevated concourse and two side platforms with two tracks.

G	Street level	Exit/Entrance
L1	Concourse	Automatic Fare Collection gates, station agent, crossover
L2	Side platform | Doors will open on the right
L2	Platform 2 Southbound	Towards ← Life Pharmacy / Expo 2020; Next Station: Burj Khalifa/Dubai Mall
L2	Platform 1 Northbound	Towards → Centrepoint; Next Station: Emirates Towers
L2	Side platform | Doors will open on the right
