= Read. (Dubai) =

Dubai-based weekly magazine

Read. is a tabloid-sized weekly magazine with a newspaper approach that is distributed to commuters in the Dubai Metro network.

Read. is the first publication in the Middle East region produced exclusively for metro commuters. Read. is published in English and it is available free of charge.
