= Emirates Towers (Dubai Metro) =

Metro station in Dubai, United Arab Emirates

Emirates Towers أبراج الإمارات

General information
- Coordinates: 25.21722°N 55.27989°E
- Line: Red Line
- Platforms: 2 side platforms
- Tracks: 2
- Connections: RTA Dubai: 21B Al Quoz Ind'l Area-4 - Al Ghubaiba Bus Stn; 27 Gold Souq Bus Stn - The Dubai Mall; 29 Al Ghubaiba Bus Stn - The Dubai Mall; 98E Al Quoz Bus Stn - Al Satwa; F11 Financial Center MS - Al Satwa; F28 Emirates Tower MS - Satwa

Construction
- Accessible: yes

Other information
- Station code: 23
- Fare zone: 6

History
- Opened: 30 April 2010

Passengers
- 2011: 1.135 million ▲27.7%

Services
Preceding station	Dubai Metro	Following station
Financial Centre towards Expo 2020 or Life Pharmacy	Red Line	World Trade Centre towards Centrepoint
Location

Emirates Towers (Arabic: أبراج الإمارات) is a rapid transit station on the Red Line of the Dubai Metro in Dubai.

== History ==
Emirates Towers station opened on 30 April 2010 along with five other stations along the already-operating Red Line and a westward extension to Ibn Battuta, also a new station.

== Location ==
Located southwest of the historic centre of Dubai, Emirates Towers station lies between Bur Dubai and many of the city's larger new developments. To the east are the Emirates Towers, after which the station is named, and the Museum of the Future, to which it is connected via a walkway. Also nearby are numerous hotels.

== Station layout ==
Like many other stations on the Red Line, Emirates Towers lies on a viaduct parallel to the east side of Sheikh Zayed Road. It is classified as a type 1 station, indicating a setup with a ground-level concourse and two elevated side platforms with two tracks.

G	Street level	Exit/Entrance
L1	Concourse	Automatic Fare Collection gates, station agent, crossover
L2	Side platform | Doors will open on the right
L2	Platform 2 Southbound	Towards ← Life Pharmacy / Expo 2020; Next Station: Financial Centre
L2	Platform 1 Northbound	Towards → Centrepoint; Next Station: World Trade Centre
L2	Side platform | Doors will open on the right
