= Dubai Trolley =

Tram system in Downtown Dubai

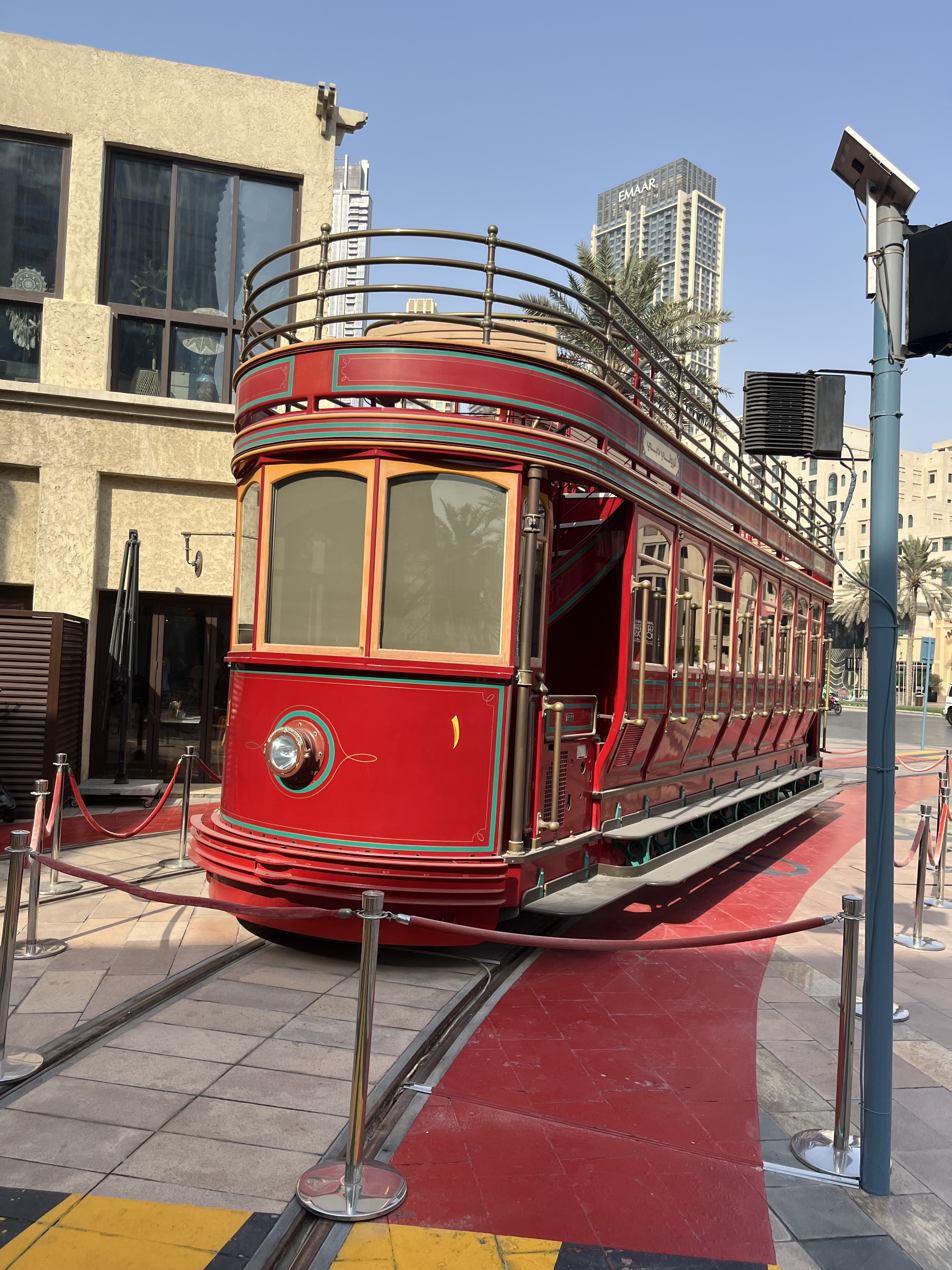
- Exterior Design of Dubai Trolley

Overview
- Status: Inactive
- Owner: Emaar Properties
- Locale: Dubai, United Arab Emirates

Service
- System: Tram

History
- Opened: 2015
- Closed: 2019

Technical
- Line length: 1.1 km (0.68 mi) (Phase I); 4.6 km (2.9 mi) (total)
- Track gauge: 1,435 mm (4 ft 8 1/2 in)
- Operating speed: 16 kilometres per hour (9.9 mph)

Dubai Trolley was a tram system in Downtown Dubai. It included a number of trams specially designed for Emaar Properties, with an operational speed of 10 km per hour. The trolleys were double-decker and could convey 50 passengers, who could ride on the open deck or the air-conditioned seating. They conveyed passengers free of charge.

The Dubai Trolley project was announced by Emaar Properties on 23 April 2008, with opening proposed for the end of 2009. The total cost was put at AED 500 million.

The line on which the Dubai Trolleys travel will be built in three phases which will form a 7 km loop around Downtown Dubai.

As of 2019, Dubai Trolley is out of operation. Poles are located at tracks, tram vehicle number one is displayed to the public in the street, depot is used as a commercial area.

== Phase I ==
Phase 1 opened in 2015. It runs in the median of the orbital Sheikh Mohammed Bin Rashid Boulevard, with three stops serving The Address, the Manzil Downtown and Vida Downtown hotels.

Phase 1 was originally planned to be a 1.1-kilometer (0.68 mi) double track express link shuttle service line operating between the Burj Place interchange station with Dubai Metro and The Dubai Mall operational by end of 2009, but was put on hold in July 2010.

== Phase II ==
Phase 2 will include the full 4.6-kilometer (2.9 mi) loop, providing a single track, mono-directional clockwise commuter service operating to and from the Burj Place interchange station with Dubai Metro. It is expected to serve all ten stations in the network's 500-acre (200 ha) development. The complete one-way journey time will take approximately 8 minutes. Opening was originally planned for 2010.

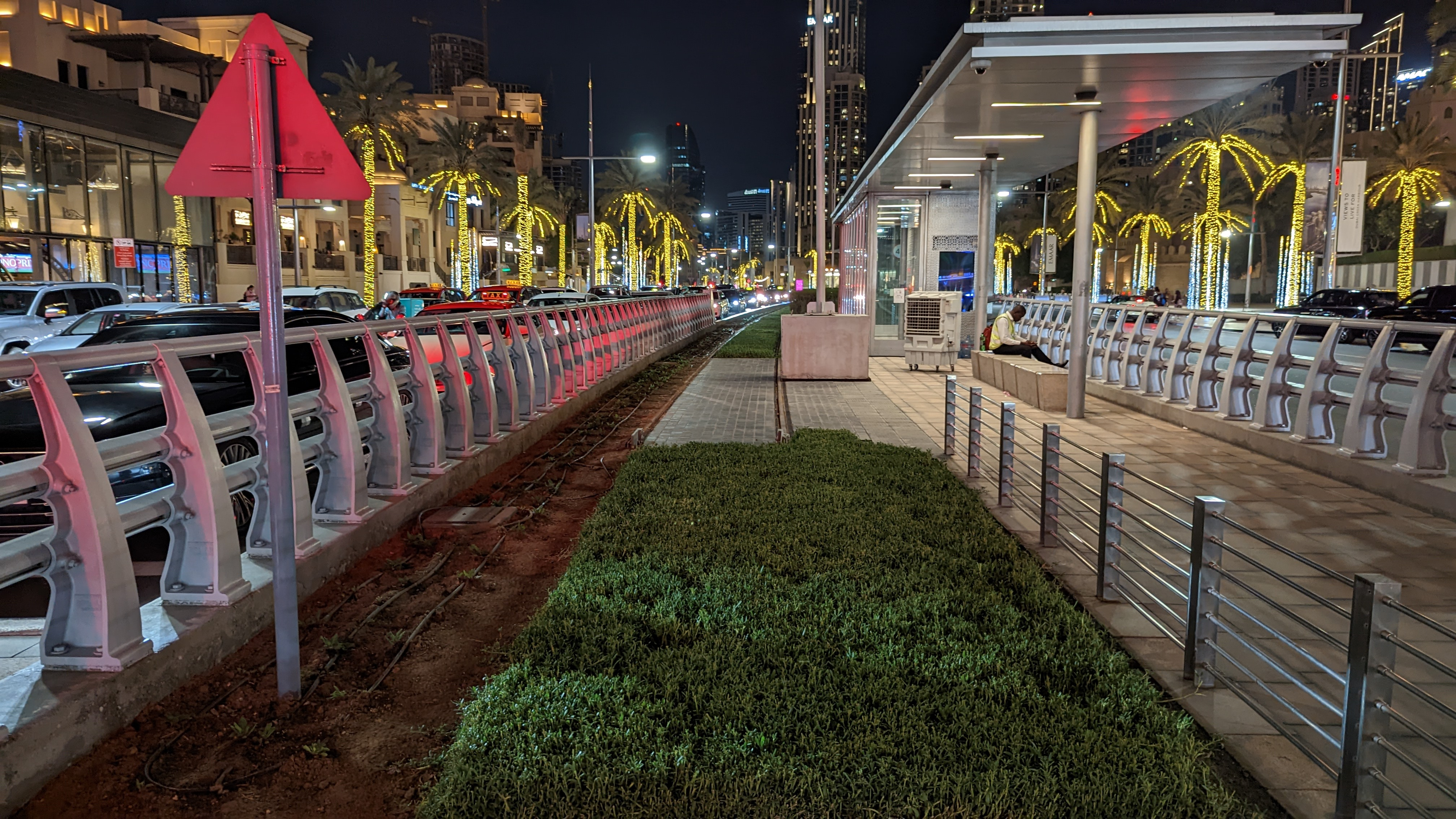
Dubai Trolley station

== Trams ==
The heritage-style open-top double-decker trams built in the US by TIG/m are powered by fuel cells, with batteries used to recover regenerated braking energy.

== See also ==
- Dubai Tram
