= Sobha Realty (Dubai Metro) =

Metro station in Dubai, United Arab Emirates

Sobha Realty شوبا العقارية

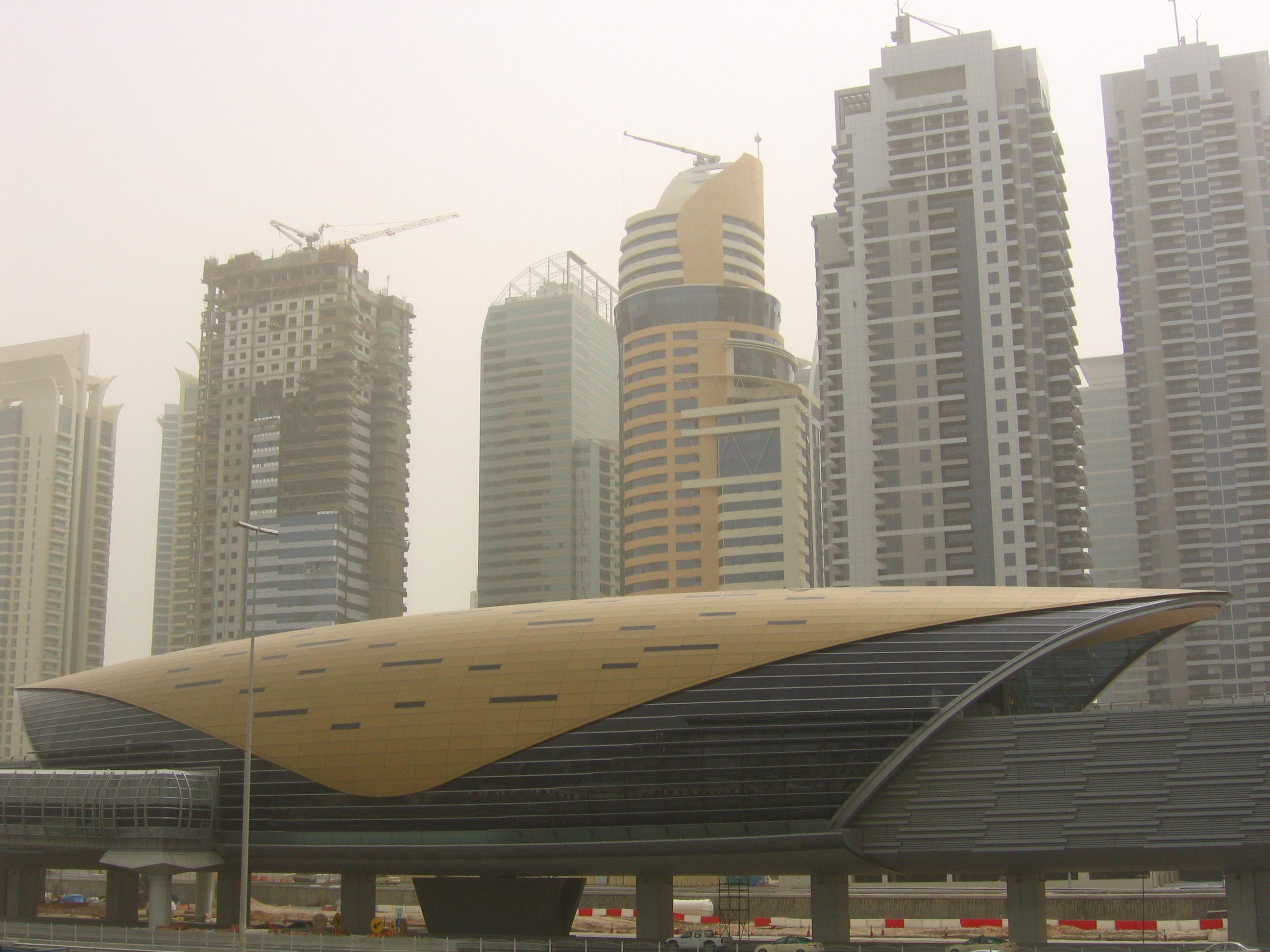

General information
- Coordinates: 25.07995°N 55.14759°E
- Line: Red Line
- Platforms: 2 side platforms
- Tracks: 2
- Connections: Dubai Tram (Dubai Marina Stn.) RTA Dubai: JLT1 Sobha Realty MS - JLT, Damas

Construction
- Accessible: yes

Other information
- Fare zone: 2

History
- Opened: 30 April 2010
- Former names: Dubai Marina; DAMAC Properties

Services
Preceding station	Dubai Metro	Following station
DMCC towards Expo 2020 or Life Pharmacy	Red Line	Al Fardan Exchange towards Centrepoint
Location

Sobha Realty (Arabic: شوبا العقارية; formerly Dubai Marina & DAMAC Properties) is a rapid transit station on the Red Line of the Dubai Metro in Dubai. It opened on 30 April 2010 as Dubai Marina and part of the extension to Ibn Battuta.

== Location ==
Sobha Realty station is located near Interchange 5 of Sheikh Zayed Road in Al Thanyah Fifth, around 20 kilometres (12 mi) southwest of Downtown Dubai. It lies to the east of the northern half of the Dubai Marina and to the west of the northern portion of Jumeirah Lake Towers.

=== Nearby development ===
Originally named Dubai Marina, the station was named after the development of the same name, one of the largest projects in Dubai. Upon completion, the Dubai Marina will house 120,000 residents around the world's largest artificial marina. Also nearby are the Jumeirah Lake Towers and The Meadows developments.

The station was named DAMAC Properties from 19 September 2014 to 24 November 2020, when it was renamed back to Dubai Marina. On 9 August 2021, this station was renamed to Sobha Realty.

== Station layout ==
Sobha Realty station lies on a viaduct paralleling the eastern side of Sheikh Zayed Road. It is categorised as a type 2 elevated station, indicating that there is an elevated concourse between street and platform level. Pedestrian access to the station is aided through walkways above Sheikh Zayed Road, connecting to developments on either side of the road.

G	Street level	Exit/Entrance
L1	Concourse	Automatic Fare Collection gates, station agent, crossover
L2	Side platform | Doors will open on the right
L2	Platform 2 Southbound	Towards ← Life Pharmacy / Expo 2020; Next Station: DMCC; Passengers may alight at the next station for Dubai Tram
L2	Platform 1 Northbound	Towards → Centrepoint; Next Station: Al Fardan Exchange
L2	Side platform | Doors will open on the right
