= Gold Line (Dubai Metro) =

Proposed metro line in Dubai, United Arab Emirates

Overview
- Status: Planned
- Owner: Roads and Transport Authority
- Locale: Dubai, United Arab Emirates
- Stations: 18 (planned)

Service
- Type: Rapid transit
- System: Dubai Metro
- Services: 1

History
- Planned opening: 9 September 2032; 6 years' time

Technical
- Track length: 42 km (26 mi)

The Gold Line is a planned rapid transit line of the Dubai Metro in Dubai, United Arab Emirates. Announced on 22 April 2026, the line is planned to be 42 kilometres (26 mi) long, serve 15 strategic areas in Dubai, and connect with 55 major real-estate developments under construction.

The project is valued at AED 34 billion and is scheduled to open on 9 September 2032. According to contemporary reporting based on project materials and the Dubai government's released rail plan map, the Gold Line will run from Al Ghubaiba to Jumeirah Golf Estates, with interchange connections to the existing Red Line and Green Line, and a future interchange with Etihad Rail.

== History ==
Dubai's metro network began operation in 2009 and, by 2025, consisted of the Red Line, the Green Line, and the Route 2020 extension, while the Blue Line was under construction.

Industry reporting before the formal announcement stated that the Roads and Transport Authority had been advancing plans for a new metro corridor sometimes referred to as "Metro Line 4" or the Gold Line.

The Gold Line was formally announced on 22 April 2026 by Mohammed bin Rashid Al Maktoum, ruler of Dubai. At the time of the announcement, the project was described as the largest transport project in Dubai, with a length of 42 kilometres, service to approximately 1.5 million residents, and stronger connectivity to 55 major real-estate developments. It will be the first fully integrated underground metro line in the emirate.

== Route ==
According to the Rail Network Plan 2032 map released through Dubai government channels, the Gold Line is planned to begin at Al Ghubaiba and terminate at Jumeirah Golf Estates. It has identified planned interchanges with the Green Line at Al Ghubaiba, with both the Red and Green lines at BurJuman, and with the Red Line at Business Bay. A future interchange with Etihad Rail at Jumeirah Golf Estates, and another Etihad Rail integration point at Meydan, were also shown on the published map according to press coverage.

The gold line would reach depths of up to 40 metres underground, include 18 stations across 15 strategic locations, and support more than 55 major real-estate developments.

== Planned operations and impact ==
The Gold Line is intended to expand the Dubai Metro network by 25 percent. It has been projected that the line would carry 465,000 passengers per day by 2040 and generate cumulative economic returns of up to 430 percent over 20 years.

The line forms part of Dubai's broader rail expansion programme. In official Dubai government material issued in connection with the Blue Line project, the existing rail network was described as 101 kilometres long, with 64 stations across metro and tram services, rising to 131 kilometres and 78 stations after the Blue Line opens.

== Stations ==
As of April 2026, an accessible official station-by-station list had not yet been published. However, contemporary reporting based on the government-released route map stated that the Gold Line would include 18 stations and serve a corridor running through Al Ghubaiba, Bur Dubai, Al Satwa, Business Bay, Meydan, Al Barsha South, Jumeirah Village Triangle, Dubai Production City and Jumeirah Golf Estates.

== See also ==
- Dubai Metro
- Red Line (Dubai Metro)
- Green Line (Dubai Metro)
- Blue Line (Dubai Metro)
- Route 2020
- Roads and Transport Authority (Dubai)
- Etihad Rail
- Transport in Dubai
