= Nol Card =

Electronic ticketing card used in Dubai, UAE

- Nol Card
- Native name: نول
- Location: Dubai, United Arab Emirates
- Launched: August 2009; 17 years ago
- Technology: Near field communication (NFC)
- Manager: Roads and Transport Authority (Dubai)
- Currency: AED (20.00 minimum load, 5000 maximum load)
- Auto recharge: Online recharge and purchase of all cards
- Unlimited use: One Day Unlimited Pass (red ticket only)
- Validity: Dubai Metro; Dubai Tram; Dubai Bus; Dubai Water Bus; Dubai Taxis
- Retailed: Online (Blue Card only); Vending machines (for red ticket); Ticket offices; Authorized Sales Agents; RTA Customer Service Centers
- Website: Official Website (in English)

The Nol Card (Arabic: نول, lit. fare, stylized as nol) is an electronic ticketing card developed by Hong Kong–based company Octopus Cards Limited that was released for all modes of public transport services in Dubai in August 2009.

A Nol Card is a credit-card-sized stored-value contactless smartcard that can hold prepaid funds to pay for fares on buses and trains within one or more of four "zones". These funds can be transferred online or at RTA customer happiness centers. The credit must be added to the card before travel. Passengers "tag on" and "tag off" their card on electronic gates at the metro station or electronic terminals in buses when entering and leaving the transport system in order to validate it or deduct funds. Initially, the cards can be purchased only from Metro Stations, Bus Terminals and some Bus Stop ticket machines. These prepaid cards can be "topped-up" online, at ticket machines, or at ticketing offices by credit, debit card or cash. The card is designed to reduce the number of transactions at ticket offices and the number of paper tickets. Usage is encouraged by offering cheaper fares than the paper ticketed option, although there is a fee to purchase the card. Unlimited one-day trip and monthly passes for the metro is only available with the Nol Red Ticket. The Blue Nol Card offers concessions for students, UAE national senior citizens and the disabled.

The number of daily transactions of Nol cards currently tops 1.5 million transactions, which includes passengers’ entry/exit from Metro and bus stations, payment of parking fees, and recharging of cards. By 2012, RTA had produced more than 5 million Nol Cards since the day it was launched (August 2009).

== Timeline ==
- In 2013, The Nol card was awarded the Best Prepaid Card in the Middle East in the Smart Card Awards Middle East 2013.
- On 26 September 2013, RTA announced the Smart Nol.
- On 21 August 2014, RTA increased the minimum balance from AED 1.80 (US$0.49) to AED 7.50 (US$2.04) to avoid journey interruptions.
- On 21 August 2014, RTA saw 52% increase on Nol Card sales since January 2014.
- On 21 October 2014, RTA announced new subscription package for the Nol Card.
- On 6 November 2014, RTA revised the public transport tariff, to take effect on 11 November 2014.

== Usage ==
The Nol card can be used to pay the fare for travel on the metro, tram, buses and water buses, and for paid parking provided by the Roads and Transport Authority (RTA). The Nol card can also be used on taxis. Currently, only 8000+ taxis including airport taxis accept the Nol card. From mid 2015 on, all taxis will be equipped with an upgraded system to accept the Nol card along with Credit/Debit cards. The Nol card can also be used in lieu of credit/debit cards in convenience stores across the city.

== Types ==
There are four different types of cards available:

Types	Red Ticket	Silver	Gold	Blue
Target users	Tourists and Visitors	Frequent travelers	Passengers who wish to access the gold class	Frequent travelers who want their credit secured
Usage	Only metro, buses and tram	All mode of transport		
Validity	90 days from the date of purchase and can be used for up to 10 journeys	5 years from the date of purchase		5 years from the date of issue
Special Features	Unlimited one-day trip and monthly passes for the metro is available	None	Gold Class access for metro and tram	1. Discount for students and senior citizen on metro.; 2. People with disabilities can travel for free on metro.

=== Special Design ===
The Roads & Transport Authority (RTA) has made a new edition of the Personalized Blue Nol cards featuring special designs of Dubai landmarks such as Burj Al Arab, Burj Khalifa, Bastakiya, Clock Roundabout, and the Trade Center in a bid to familiarize visitors, as well as residents, with iconic landmarks of the Emirate.

=== Limited Edition Cards ===
The Roads & Transport Authority (RTA) launches limited editions cards to mark various occasions and events such as the National Day. One recent limited edition card was themed after Expo 2020.

== Smart Nol ==
Announced on 26 November 2013, The Roads and Transport Authority (RTA) announced its partnership with Etisalat & du to launch its first ‘Smart Nol’ Service. Smart Nol is similar to Apple Pay and Google Wallet tap and pay, Smart Nol uses NFC enabled smart phones to check-in and check-out of the metro, bus, water bus and metro parking.

The nol system has since expanded beyond the original NFC-SIM-based Smart Nol service. Virtual nol cards can be issued and managed through the nol Pay app on supported Samsung and Huawei devices, allowing passengers to use a compatible phone or wearable for public-transport check-in and check-out. Physical cards can also be managed through NFC-enabled services for functions such as balance top-ups and travel-pass purchases. In parallel, the RTA is converting nol from a card-based ticketing system to account-based ticketing, with the upgrade intended to support additional payment methods such as bank cards, digital wallets and QR-code tickets.

=== Requirements ===
Smart Nol requires NFC SIM from Etisalat or du and a compatible handset.

=== Nol Plus ===
Nol Plus is a rewards program that was initiated by Roads and Transport Authority (Dubai) in 2019. Nol Plus utilises a points system where the user can earn points by using their Nol Card to pay for public transport, taxi fares, and parking. 1 AED is equivalent to 1 point and the user can also redeem points on the official website where 10 AED is equivalent to 1000 points.

== See also ==
- List of smart cards
- Roads and Transport Authority (Dubai)
- Dubai Metro
