= Dubai Tram =

Tram system in Dubai

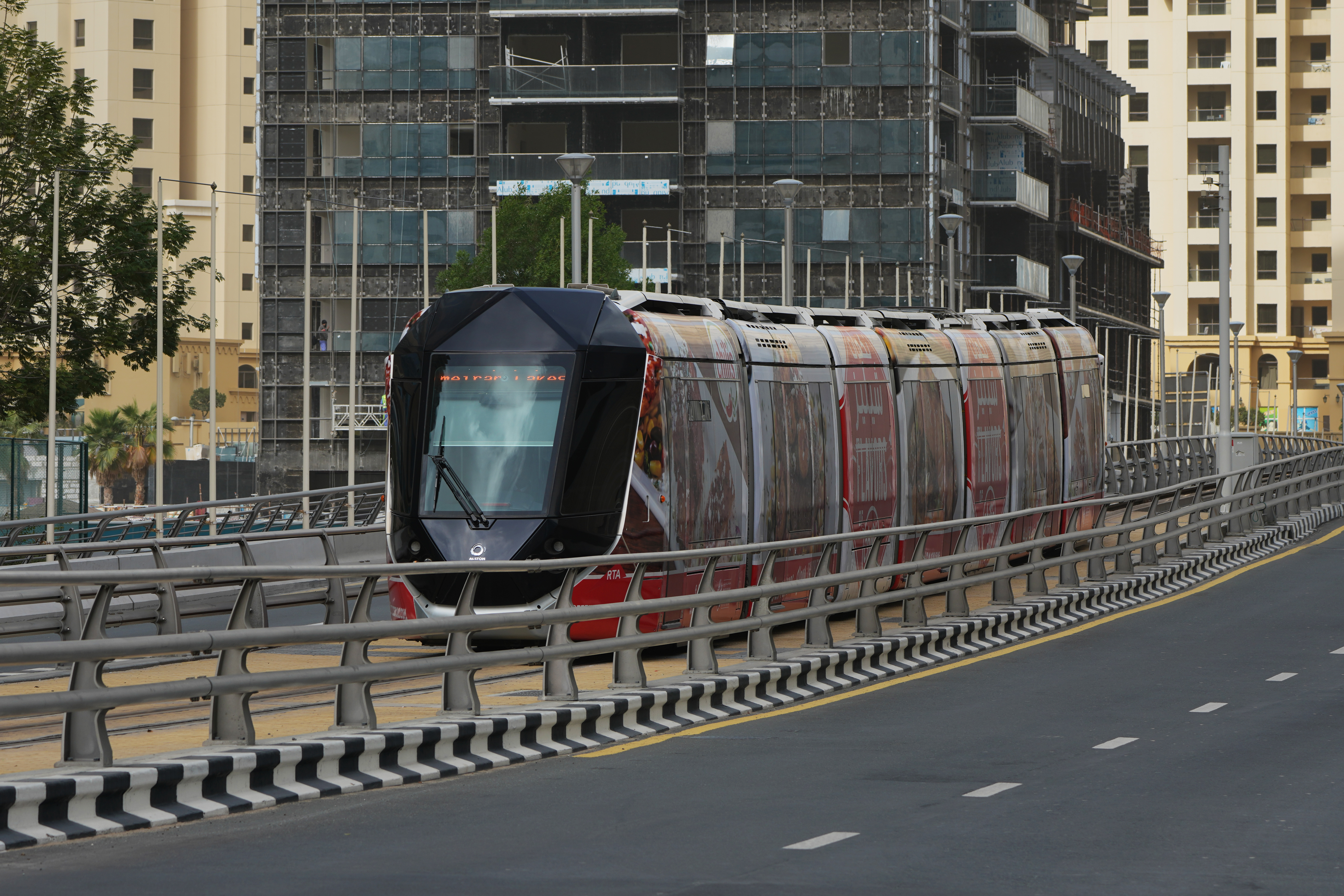
- A tram with a Chili’s advertisement at Dubai Marina.

Overview
- Native name: ترام دبي
- Owner: Roads & Transport Authority
- Locale: Dubai, United Arab Emirates
- Transit type: Tram
- Number of stations: 11 (19 planned)
- Website: www.rta.ae

Operation
- Began operation: 11 November 2014
- Operator: Keolis MHI
- Rolling stock: Alstom Citadis 402

Technical
- System length: 10.6 km (6.6 mi) (14.5 km (9.0 mi) total planned)
- No. of tracks: 2
- Track gauge: 1,435 mm (4 ft 8 1/2 in) standard gauge
- Electrification: 750 V DC ground-level power supply (750 V DC overhead line on depot area)
- Average speed: 20 km/h (12 mph)
- Top speed: 50 km/h (31 mph)
System map
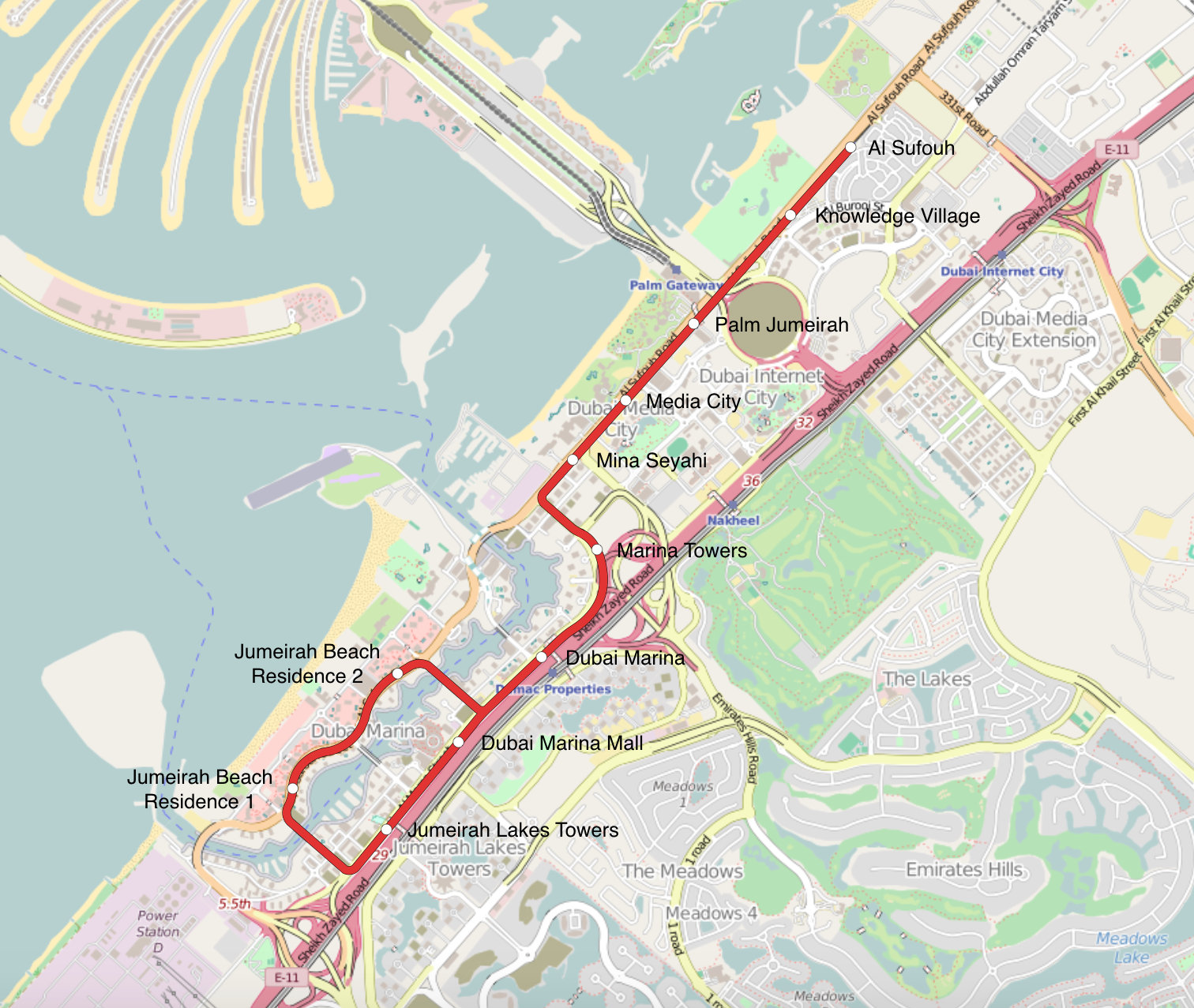

The Dubai Tram (Arabic: ترام دبي) is a tramway located in Al Sufouh, Dubai, United Arab Emirates. It runs for 14.5 kilometers (9.0 mi) along Al Sufouh Road from Dubai Marina to the Palm Jumeirah and Al Sufouh. The tram connects with the DMCC and Sobha Realty stations of the Dubai Metro's Red Line, and two more stations are expected to connect with the tram in the future. The Dubai Tram is also connected with the monorail of the Palm Jumeirah at the entrance of the Palm from Sufouh Road.

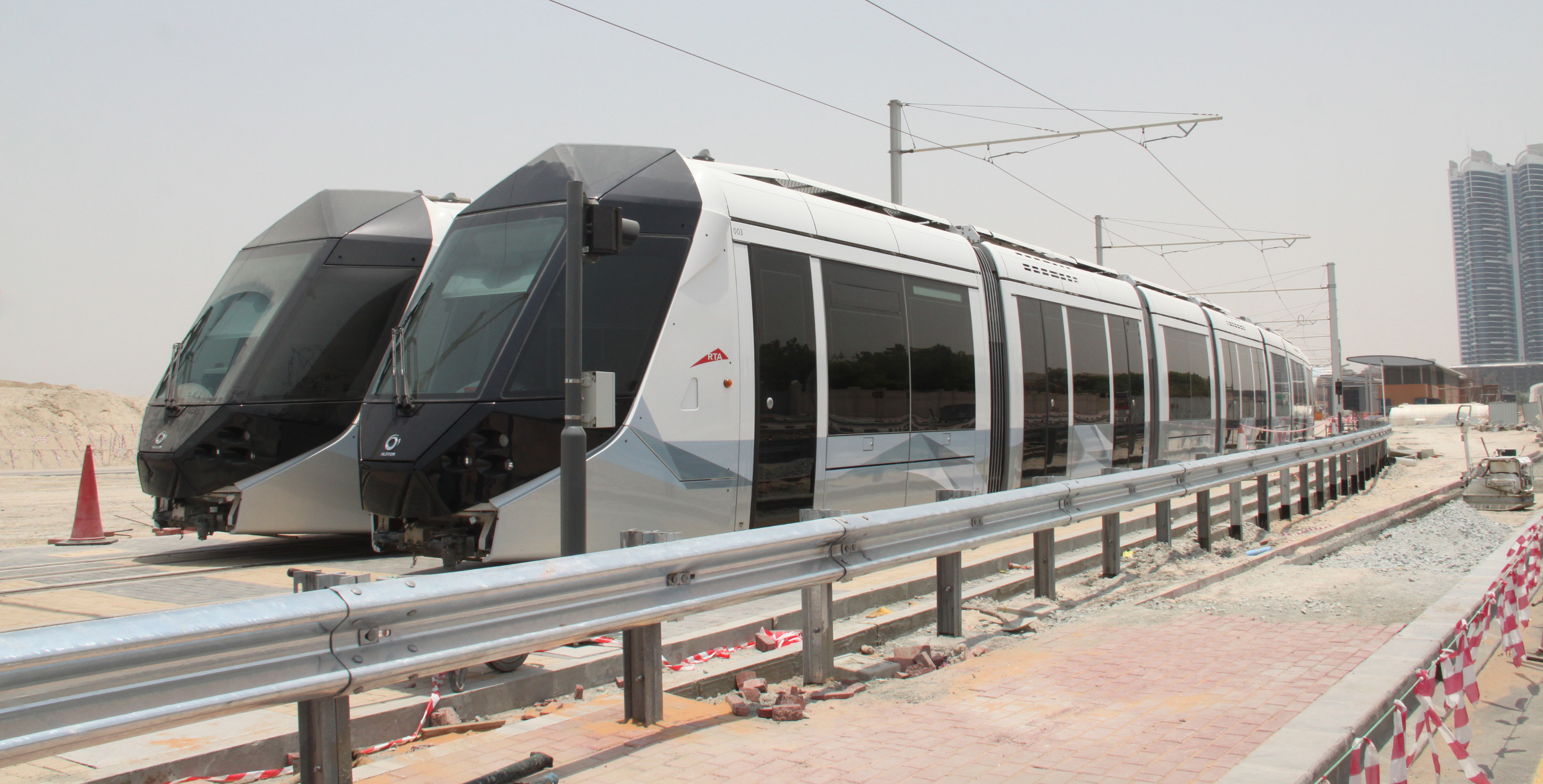
Alstom Citadis 402 trams near the Al Sufouh depot in July 2014.

The first section, a 10.6-kilometer (6.6 mi) long tram line which serves 11 stations, was ceremonially inaugurated on 11 November 2014, by Sheikh Mohammed bin Rashid Al Maktoum, Vice-President and Prime Minister of UAE and Ruler of Dubai, with the line officially opening for public service at 6:30 am (UTC 04:30) on 12 November 2014.

The Dubai Tram is the fourth tramway project in the world after the Bordeaux tramway in 2003, and the Reims and Angers tramways in 2011, to be powered by the Alstom APS ground-level power supply system.

== Construction ==
The planning and construction of the Dubai Tram was undertaken by a consortium of Alstom, Besix and Parsons.

Construction has been divided into two phases: Phase 1, was expected to be open in April 2011, however it was delayed until November 2014. Upon completion, Phase 1 of the tramline will operate 11 trams, serving 11 stations, covering 10.6 kilometers (6.6 mi) of route. The Phase 1 will cost AED 3.18 Billion. Some 9.5 kilometers (5.9 mi) of the Dubai Tram project will be built as part of the first Phase 1. Phase 2 will add 14 more trams and eight more stations along an additional 4 kilometers (2.5 mi) of route.

As of 10 October 2010, the construction work on Dubai Tramway had progressed according to the scheduled completion of 2014. However the project was put on hold a month later due to lack of finances. The construction of the tramway was resumed in January 2011 with 30% of Phase 1 having been completed. In mid-2014, the tramline entered the testing phase, and it began operation in November 2014.

== Route ==
Route of Dubai Tram

Code	Station Name		Notes
Code	English	Arabic	Notes
1	Jumeriah Beach Residence 1	أبراج شاطئ الجميرا 1	
2	Jumeriah Beach Residence 2	أبراج شاطئ الجميرا 2	
3	Jumeriah Lakes Towers	أبراج بحيرات الجميرا	Interchange with DMCC Station of Red Line (Dubai Metro)
4	Dubai Marina Mall	دبي مارينا مول	
5	Dubai Marina	دبي مارينا	Interchange with Sobha Realty Station of Red Line (Dubai Metro)
6	Marina Towers	أبراج المارينا	
7	Mina Seyahi	الميناء السياحي	
8	Media City	مدينة دبي للإعلام	
9	Palm Jumeriah	نخلة جميرا	Interchange with Palm Gateway Station of Palm Monorail
10	Knowledge Village	قرية المعرفة	
11	Al Sufouh	الصفوح	

== Operations ==
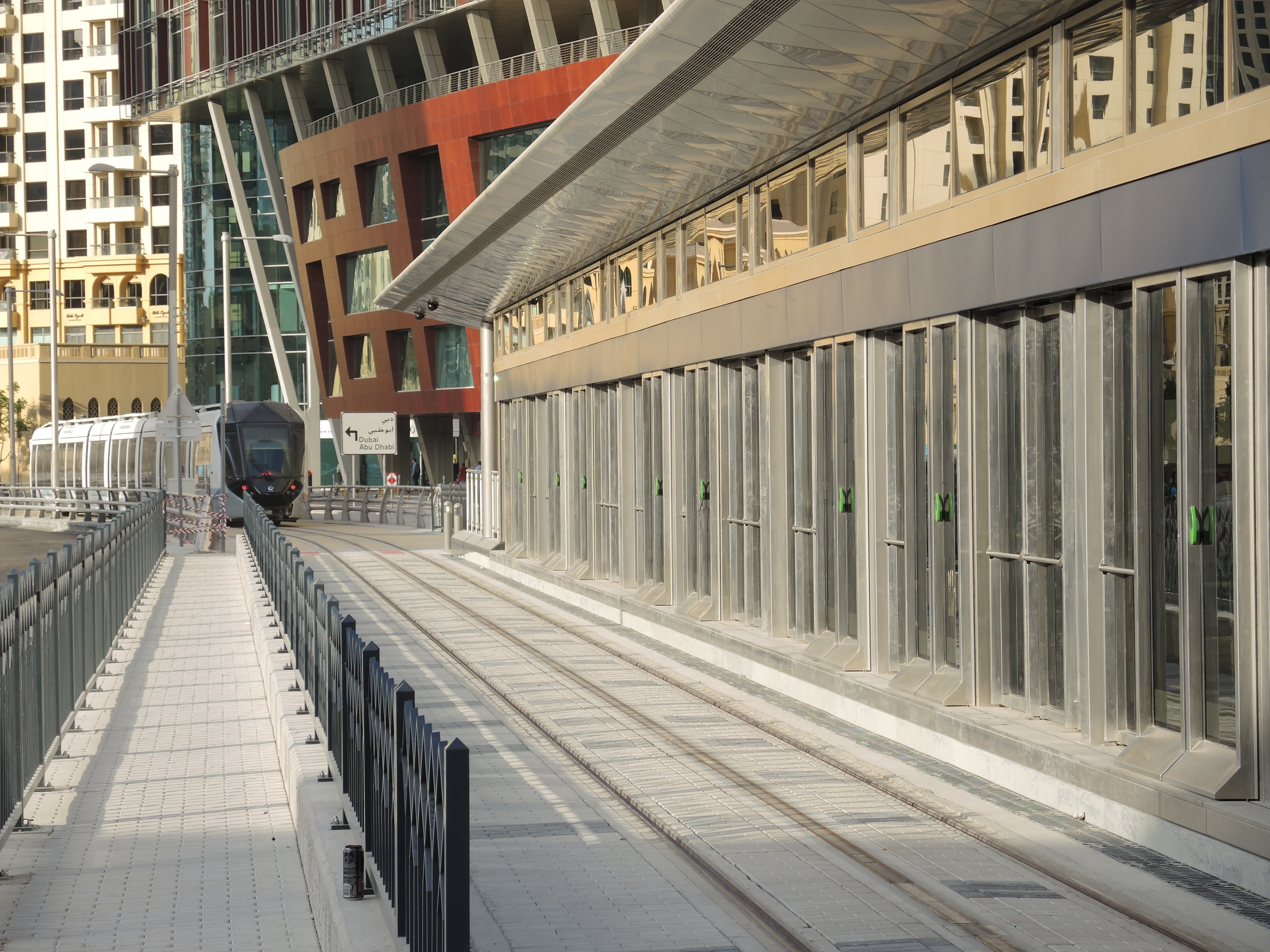
Dubai Tram platform with safety screen doors

The Dubai Tram has been operated by Keolis.MHI, a consortium of Keolis and Mitsubishi Heavy Industries under contract to the Dubai Roads & Transport Authority since September 2021. It was previously operated by Serco.

There are over 80 certified drivers for the tram. To ensure the safety of the tram and the passengers, every driver is required to take (and pass) an alcohol test before driving the tram. The trams also have a dead man's switch, which the drivers are required to press every three to five seconds, failing which the tram will come to a halt.

=== Hours of operation and frequency ===
The Dubai Tram operates from 06:00 a.m. until 01:00 a.m. except on Sundays when it operates from 09:00 a.m. until 01:00 a.m..

=== Fares ===
The tram has a fixed fare of AED 3 per trip regardless of the distance travelled, making it one of the cheapest fares for trams, compared to other cities. The fare for passengers using the Red Nol Ticket will be AED 4 (US$1.09) per ride.

A Nol Card can be used by passengers to check-in and check-out of the tram by scanning the card at the platform screen doors.

Statistics
	2014	2015 to June
Lines	2	2
Kilometres	9.5	9.5
Stations	11	11
Trips (Total)		
Passengers (Total)	531,000	1,854,055

== Rolling stock ==
The Dubai Tram use 11 Alstom Citadis 402 trams for Phase 1. The trams are 44 m (144 ft) long with a capacity of 408 passengers. Maximum speed is 50 km/h (31 mph), giving an average operational speed of 20 km/h (12 mph).

The trams use the Alstom APS ground-level power supply, and so do not need overhead wire. This method was first used in Bordeaux, France. The Dubai Tram is the world's first tram network to use platform screen doors at the stations, as well as a new Supervised Vehicle Operation (SVO) mode that will ensure accurate station stop and safety during passenger transfer. The trams have Gold (first) and silver classes, and space dedicated to women and children.

The first tram was presented to Mattar Al Tayer, Chairman of the Road & Transport Authority, at Alstom's La Rochelle factory on 14 June 2013.

== Incidents and accidents ==
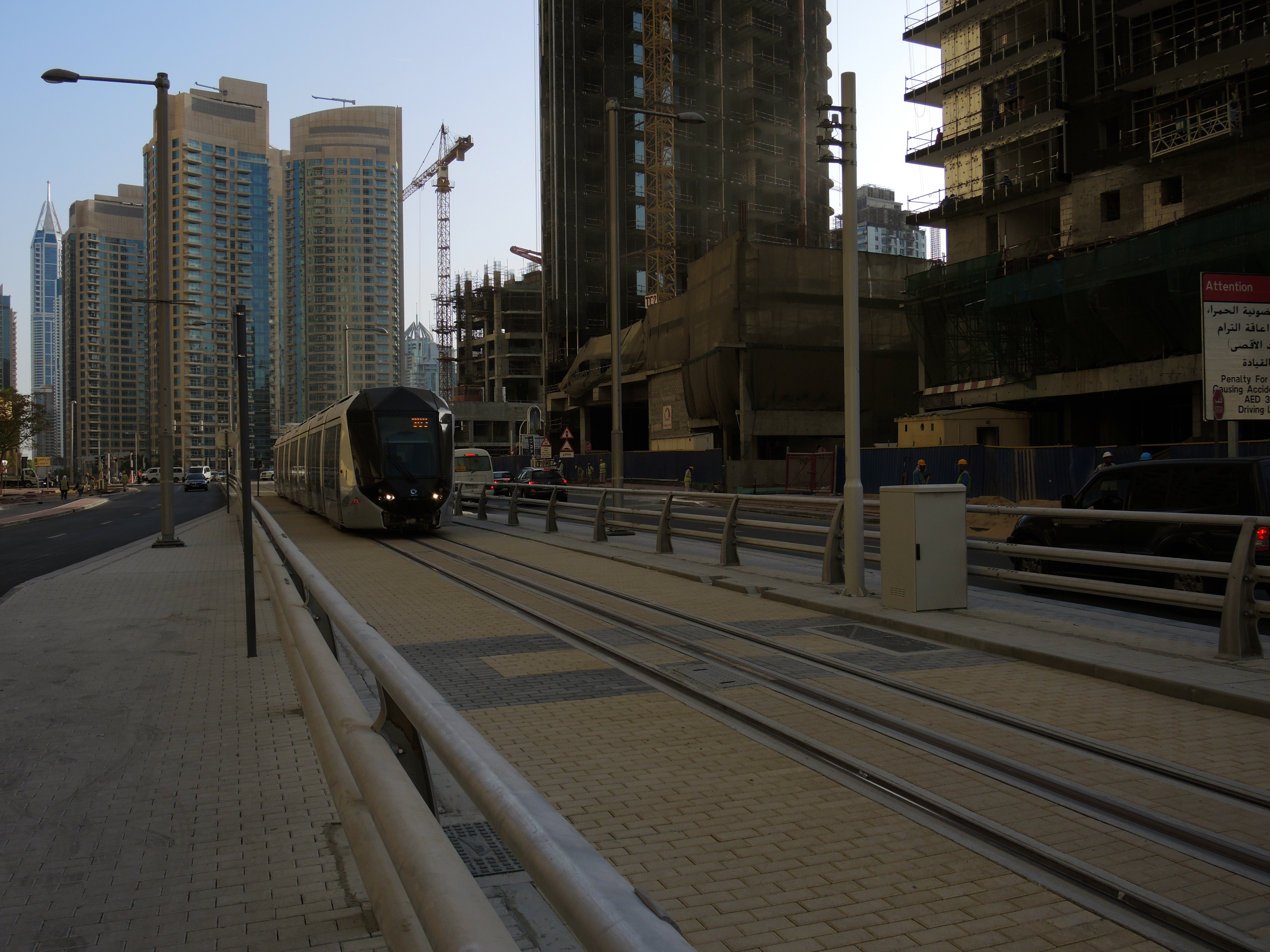
Tram on test run in November 2014. Note safety barriers each side of tracks.

- 2 October 2014: During the test run, a car collided with the oncoming tram after jumping a red light signal. According to Dubai Police, neither the driver nor anyone else was injured in the accident but the vehicle sustained damage to its front portion and the tram sustained minimal damage.
- 17 December 2014: The tram service was disrupted for 15 minutes due to a collision between the tram and a car after the car driver read a green light for another lane and mistakenly turned left on a red light, then stopped on the tram's tracks at an intersection in Jumeirah Beach Residence.
- 16 April 2024: Due to heavy rain causing floods, the tram service was suspended, however, full service was restored on the next day.

== Linking with other networks ==
The Dubai Tram has two stations that are interconnected to two Dubai Metro stations:

- Jumeirah Lake Towers (JLT) with DMCC (Dubai Metro)
- Dubai Marina with Sobha Realty (Dubai Metro)

It is also interconnected to the Palm Monorail:

- Palm Jumeirah with Palm Gateway (out-of-station interchange)

== See also ==
- Downtown Dubai Tramway
- List of development projects in Dubai
- Transport in Dubai
