= Dubai Metro =

Rapid transit system in Dubai

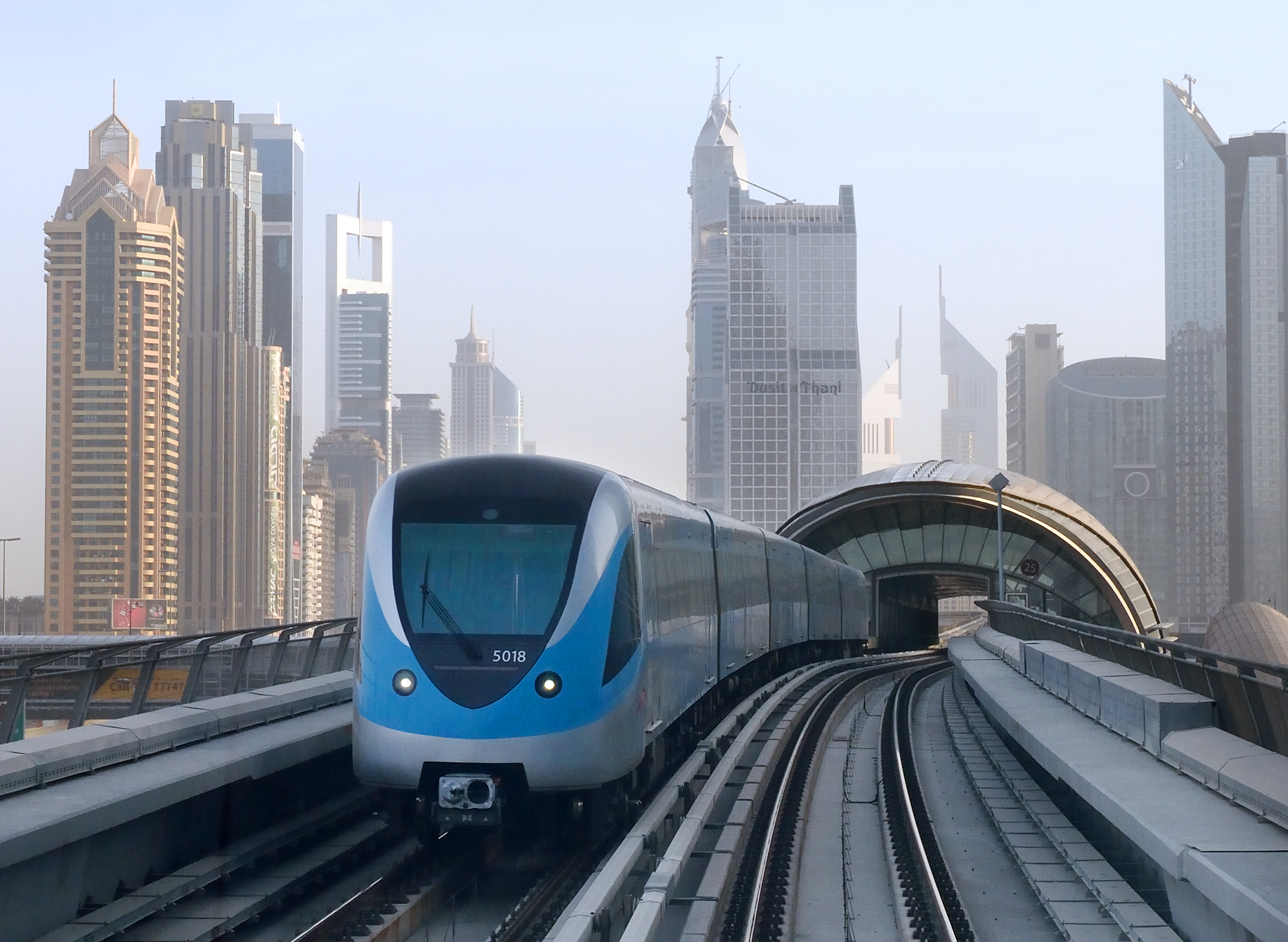
- Dubai Metro train departing the Burj Khalifa / Dubai Mall station on the Red Line.

Overview
- Native name: مترو دبي
- Owner: Roads & Transport Authority
- Locale: Dubai, United Arab Emirates
- Transit type: Rapid transit
- Number of lines: 2 (3 in 2029)
- Number of stations: 55
- Daily ridership: 755,000 (2024)
- Annual ridership: 294,700,000 (2025)
- Headquarters: Al Garhoud, Dubai
- Website: www.rta.ae

Operation
- Began operation: 9 September 2009; 17 years ago
- Operators: Keolis; Mitsubishi Heavy Industries; Mitsubishi Corporation
- Train length: 5

Technical
- System length: 89.6 km (55.7 mi)
- No. of tracks: 2
- Track gauge: 1,435 mm (4 ft 8 1/2 in) standard gauge
- Electrification: 750 V DC third rail
- Top speed: 95 km/h (59 mph)

The Dubai Metro (Arabic: مترو دبي) is an automated rapid transit system in the city of Dubai, United Arab Emirates. The metro system consists of a network of two main lines: the Red Line and the Green Line. A third line, the Blue Line, is scheduled to open in 2029. A fourth line, the Gold Line, was announced on 22 April 2026, and is scheduled to open in 2032.

Dubai Metro was the first rapid transit train network in the Arabian Peninsula and the Gulf Cooperation Council. It began operations on 9 September 2009. The metro runs underground in the city centre and on elevated viaducts elsewhere. All trains are fully automated and driverless. Both the trains and stations are temperature controlled and have platform edge doors. Dubai Metro has a total length of 89.6 kilometres (56 mi) and 55 stations, 35 on the Red Line and 20 on the Green Line.

From 2009 to 2016, Dubai Metro was the world's longest driverless metro network with a route length of 75 kilometres (47 mi), as recognized by Guinness World Records in 2012. The system was surpassed by the Vancouver SkyTrain in 2016 for the longest fully automated system in the world but regained the title in 2021 with the opening of Route 2020 until December 2024 when it was surpassed by the opening of Riyadh Metro.

== History ==
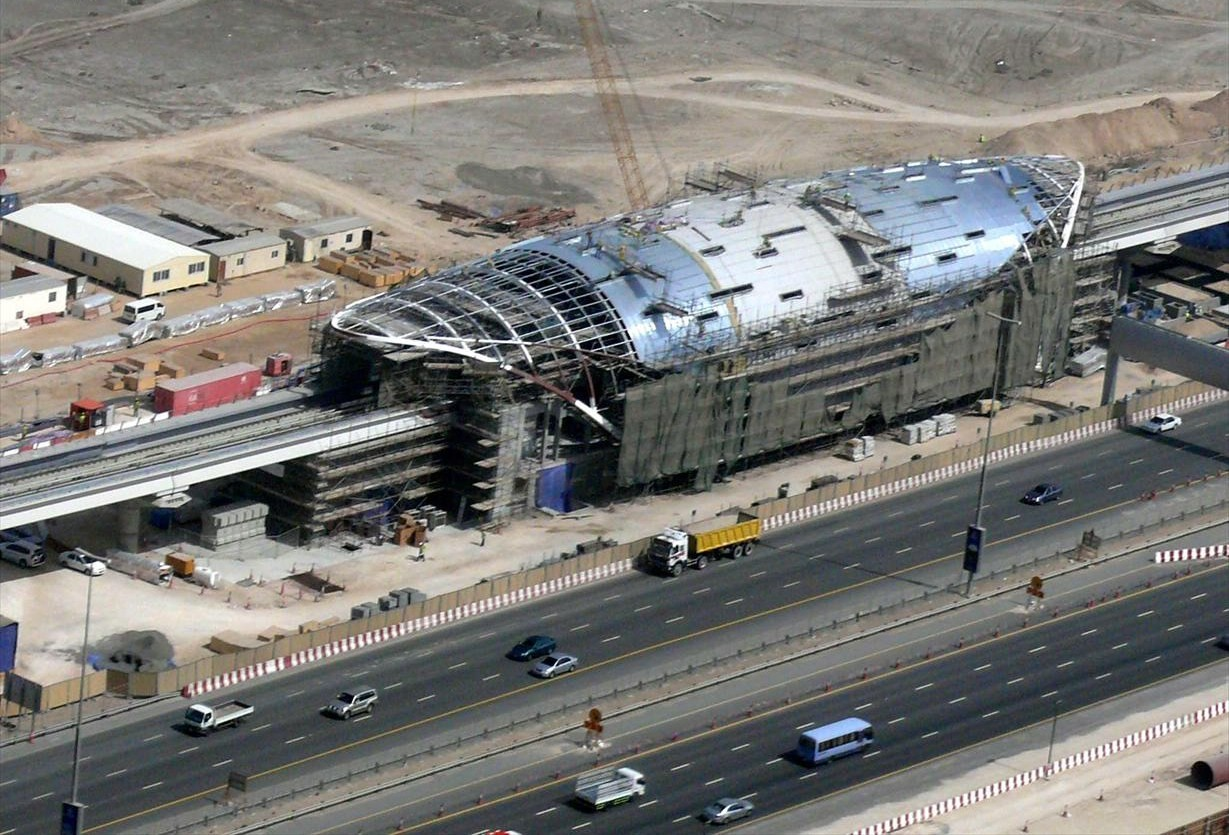
Jebel Ali Industrial (now known as Danube) under construction in May 2008

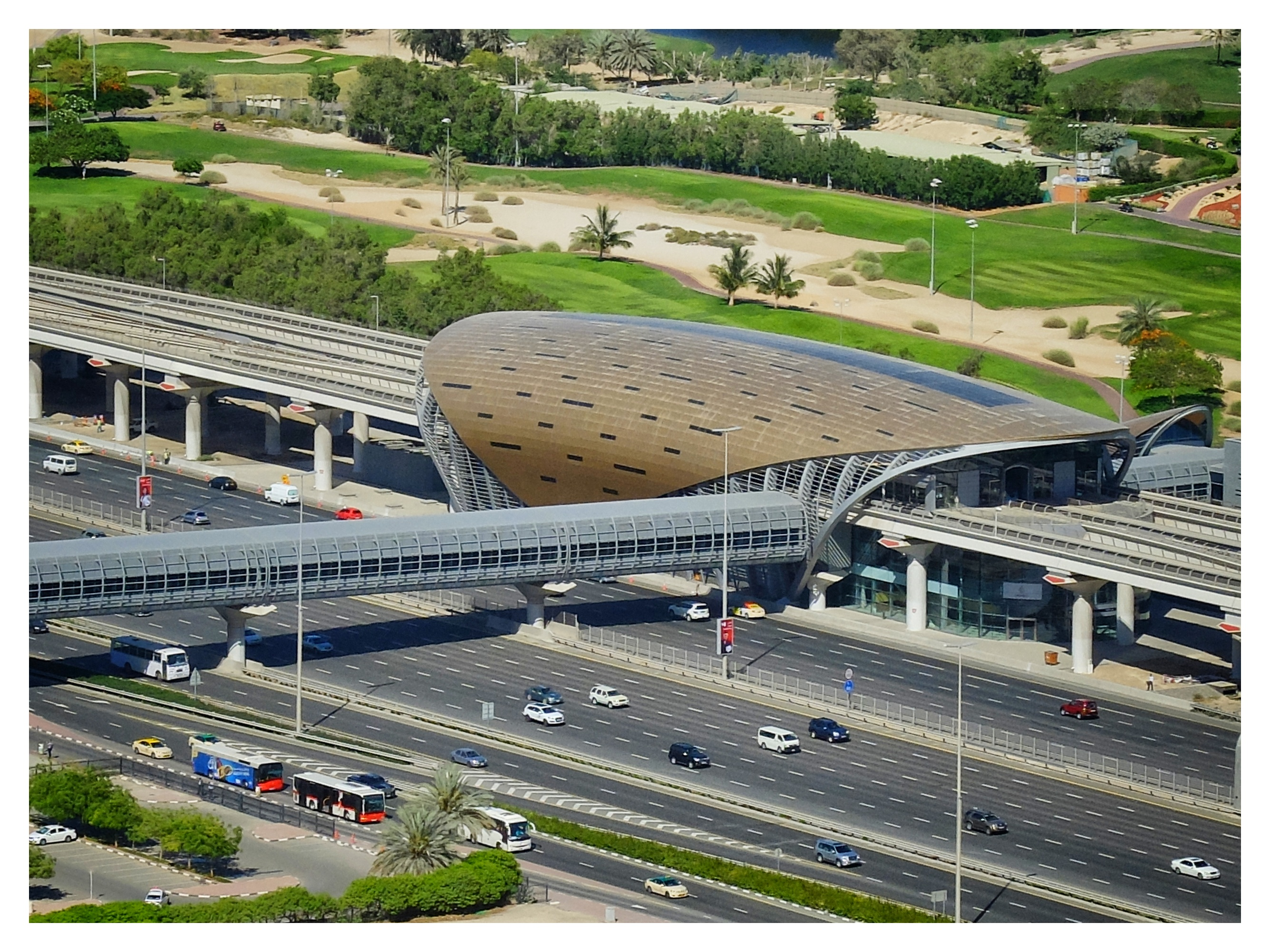
Nakheel (now Al Fardan Exchange) in June 2013

In 1997, Dubai Municipality studies on urban development identified the need for a rail system to relieve growing traffic levels and to support the urban development in Dubai. Planning of the Dubai Metro began under the directive of Dubai's Ruler, Sheikh Mohammed bin Rashid Al Maktoum in 2003. Dubai expected to attract 15 million visitors by 2010. The combination of a rapidly growing population, which was expected to reach 3 million by 2017, and severe traffic congestion necessitated the building of an urban rail system to provide additional public transportation capacity, relieve motor traffic, and provide infrastructure for additional development. In 2004, five consortia were shortlisted to build the first section.

In May 2005, a AED 12.45 billion ($3.4 billion) design and build contract was awarded to the Dubai Rail Link (DURL) consortium made up of Japanese companies including Mitsubishi Heavy Industries, Mitsubishi Corporation, Obayashi Corporation, Kajima Corporation and Turkish firm Yapı Merkezi, The Project Management and Construction Management services contract was awarded to a French-American joint venture between Systra and Parsons Corporation. The first phase worth AED 15.5 billion ($4.2 billion) covers 35 kilometres (22 mi) of the proposed network, including the Red Line between Al Rashidiya and the Jebel Ali Free Zone.

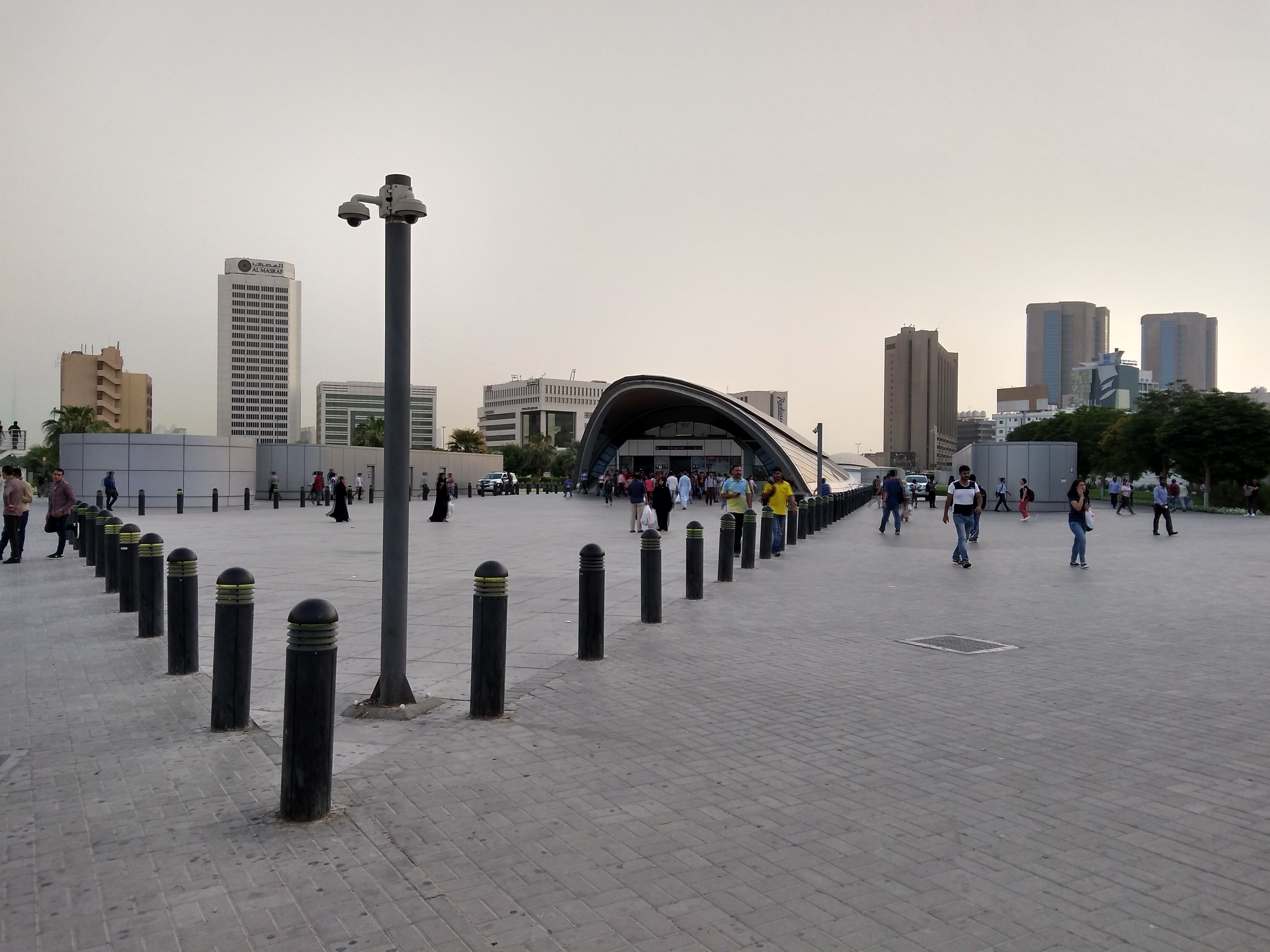
The entrance to Union Station, one of two interchange stations that connects the Red Line with the Green Line

Work officially commenced on the construction of the metro on 21 March 2006. In February 2009, an RTA Rail Agency official stated the US$4.2 billion Dubai Metro project would be completed on schedule despite the 2008 financial crisis. 10 out of 29 metro stations of the Red Line opened on 9 September 2009.

The Red Line was partially opened at 9 minutes and 9 seconds past 9 pm on 9 September 2009 (9/9/9 9:09:09 PM), inaugurated by Sheikh Mohammed bin Rashid Al Maktoum. More than 110,000 people, nearly 10 percent of Dubai's population at the time, used the Metro in its first two days of operation. The Line opened to the public at 6 am (UTC 04:00) on 10 September 2009. The Dubai Metro carried 10 million passengers from launch on 9 September 2009 to 9 February 2010 with 11 stations operational on the Red Line.

Seven more stations on the Red Line opened on 30 April 2010: Emirates, Airport Terminal 1, Al Karama (now ADCB), Emirates Towers, Dubai Internet City, Dubai Marina (now Sobha Realty), and Ibn Battuta. Ten new trains were pressed into service, giving a total of 22 trains in service when the stations opened. In addition to this, a further three stations were opened on 15 May 2010; Al Garhoud Station and World Trade Centre Station. Furthermore, Business Bay, Equiti, InsuranceMarket (Al Barsha) Station, Al Fardan Exchange, and DMCC were opened on 15 October 2010. The Life Pharmacy Station and the terminus of the Red Line was opened on 11 March 2011. The Danube was opened on 12 December 2012. Al Jadaf Station and Creek Station, on the Green Line were opened on 1 March 2014.

A 15 km (9.3 mi) extension of the Red Line known as Route 2020, which connects to Expo 2020, was announced in September 2016, and was completed and inaugurated on 8 July 2020. Engineering consultancy Atkins provided multidisciplinary design and management of the civil works on Route 2020.

A 30 km (19 mi) third line with 14 stations, called the Blue Line, was announced on 24 November 2023, with a total investment of AED 18 billion, and an expected operational date by 2029. The Blue Line will extend from the terminus of the Red Line on Centrepoint Station and the Green Line terminus at the Creek Station.

A 42 km (26 mi) fourth line with 18 stations, called the Gold Line, was announced on 22 April 2026, with a total investment of AED 34 billion, and an expected operational date by 2032.The Gold Line will run from Al Ghubaiba to Jumeirah Golf Estates, with interchange connections to the existing Red and Green Lines, and a future interchange with Etihad Rail.

== Operation ==
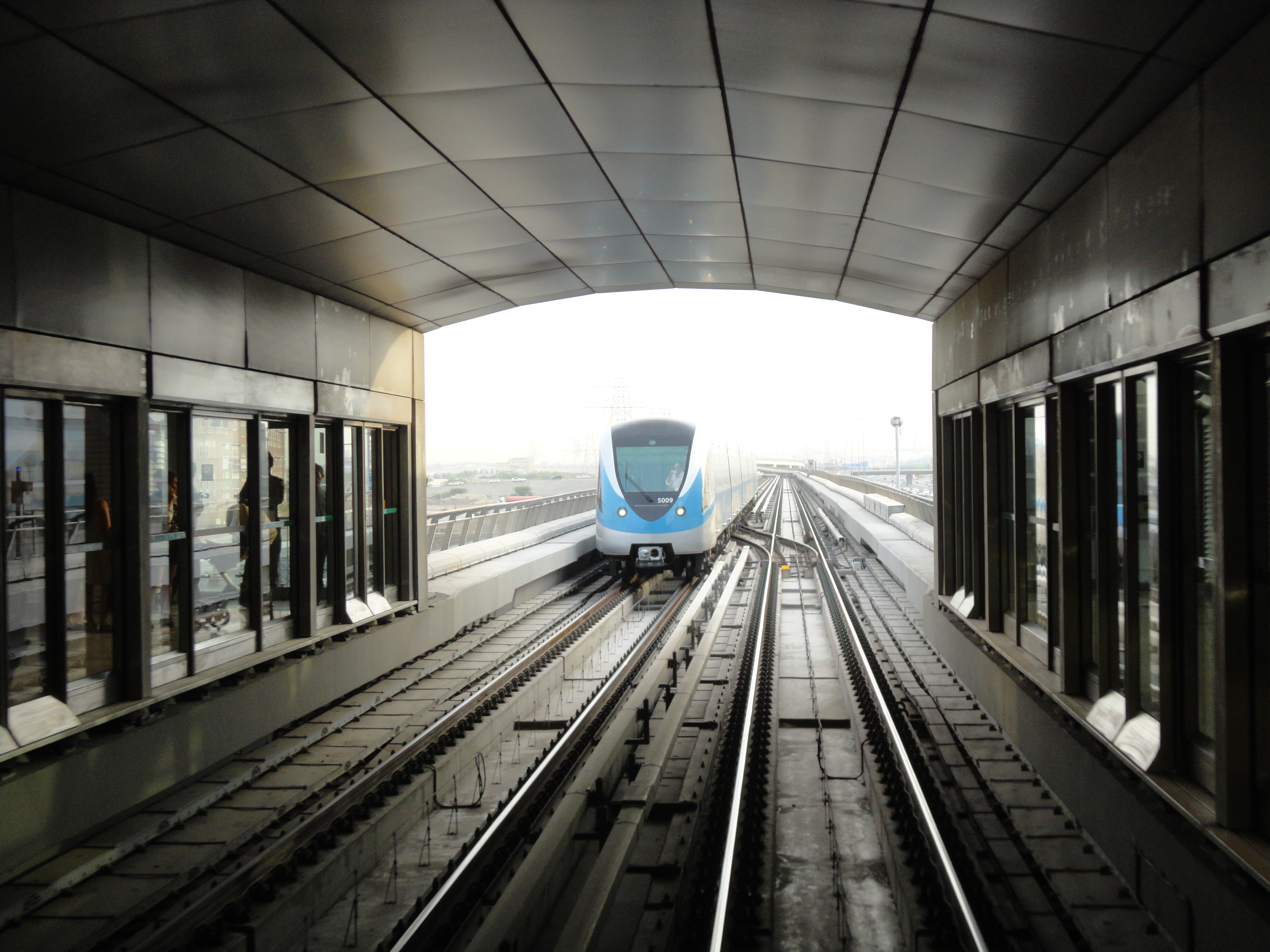
A train approaching the Ibn Battuta station.

The Dubai Metro was operated by Serco under contract to the Roads & Transport Authority which was last renewed in March 2019. In March 2021, the Keolis MHI consortium of Keolis (70%), Mitsubishi Heavy Industries (25%) and Mitsubishi Corporation (5%) was announced as a new operator from 8 September 2021.

Red Line trains run every 5 to 7 minutes off-peak (averaging 8.5 trains per hour), with a minimum headway of 3 minutes 45 seconds (16 trains per hour) during peak hours, with 44 trainsets in service. Trains from the Red Line and Green Line can depart differently due to technical glitches. From 2010, when 51 trains were in service, the line had a peak-hour capacity of 11,675 passengers per hour in each direction. As of September 2014, the Red Line operates 60 trains (set numbers 5001–5045, 5065–5079). The theoretical maximum design capacity is 25,720 passengers per hour, which would require 106 trains.

The Green Line had an initial capacity of 6,395 passengers per hour per direction, with 19 trains (set numbers 5046–5064) in service as of September 2014. The design capacity of this route is put at 13,380 passengers per hour with 60 trains in service.

=== Signalling ===
To permit fully automated operation, Thales Rail Signalling Solutions supplies SelTrac IS communications-based train control and NetTrac central control technology. This is configured for a minimum headway of 90 seconds (40 trains per hour). The top speed of the trains is estimated to be around 95 km/h (59 mph), giving a round-trip time of 2 hours 23 minutes for the Red Line and 1 hour 23 minutes for the Green Line.

=== Ridership ===
Over 280,000 passengers used the Dubai Metro during the first week of its operation in September 2009. After the first month of operation on a limited network, the monthly total passengers was 1,740,578 passengers, which equates to under 60,000 passengers/day.

After the opening of more stations in May 2010, ridership surged to 103,002 passengers/day and reached 130,000/day by the beginning of October 2010. When the Green Line opened on 9 September 2011, passengers on the Red Line was noted as 180,000/day. In 2013, passengers rose to 377,000/day, split 64% for the Red Line and 36% for the Green Line. During the first half of 2015, RTA announced that 88,252,034 passengers have used the metro. In August 2017, RTA announced that total ridership since 2009 had surpassed 1 billion total trips.

Annual ridership
Year	Total ridership
2009	6,089,000
2010	38,089,000
2011	69,001,000
2012	109,049,000
2013	137,076,000
2014	164,031,000
2015	178,065,000
2016	191,300,000
2017	200,075,000
2018	204,000,000
2019	202,978,067
2020	113,063,000
2021	151,026,000
2022	225,142,000
2023	260,034,000
2024	275,400,000

== Lines ==
Dubai Metro currently has a total length of 89.6 kilometres (56 mi) and 55 stations on two lines:

- Red Line with a total length of 67.1 kilometres (42 mi) and 35 stations.
- Green Line with a total length of 22.5 kilometres (14 mi) and 20 stations.

Two lines are under construction as of April 2026:

- Blue Line with a length of 30 kilometres (19 mi) and 14 stations. It is scheduled to open in 2029.
- Gold Line with a total length of 42 kilometres (26 mi) and 18 stations. It is scheduled to open in 2032.

=== Red Line ===
The Red Line stretches along the city from the Jebel Ali area to the border with Sharjah. It passes through several tourist attractions such as Mall of the Emirates, The Dubai Mall, and Burj Khalifa.

Route 2020 is a 15 kilometer (9 mi) extension of the Red Line with seven new stations which starts at the Jebel Ali Station and ends at Expo 2020. An extension currently underway will also extend this line to the Al Maktoum International Airport. The extension is served by new, redesigned trains from Alstom. The extension opened in stages in 2021.

=== Green Line ===
The Green Line stays within the old Dubai area. It passes through historical sites, such as the Dubai Museum, the Gold Souk, and the Spice Souk. Stations near those places are built in keeping with the historical architecture of Dubai that mirrors the architecture of the surrounding area. The stations also have with photos depicting the UAE in the 1960s or earlier being on display within the station.

=== Summary of lines ===
Lines	Terminals		Construction started	Opened	Newest Extension	Length km	Stations	Trip time	max speed	average speed
Red Line	Centrepoint	Life Pharmacy	2006	2009	2021	67	34	55–75 minutes	60–80 km/h	34 km/h
Red Line	Centrepoint	Expo 2020	2016	2021	2021	67	34	11 minutes	60–80 km/h	
Green Line	E&	Creek	2006	2011	2014	22.5	20	39–40 minutes	60–90 km/h	34 km/h
Blue Line	Creek	Academic City	2025	2029		30	14			
Blue Line	Centrepoint	Academic City	2025	2029		30	14			
Gold Line	Al Ghubaiba	Jumeirah Golf Estates	TBA	2032		42	18			

=== Proposed ===
In 2011, the RTA stated that there are no "immediate plans" to build the Blue and Purple lines "in the next five or six years". This is mainly because the planned area is empty and developing.

In 2013, the RTA laid out a three-phase plan to expand the existing lines and build new ones: extending the Green Line by 12 stations and 24 kilometres (15 mi) to Academic City by 2020; expanding the overall system by 58 stations and 91 kilometres (57 mi) by 2025 and completing expansion with a total of 69 stations and 221 km over and above the present 47 stations and 70 kilometres (43 mi) that are present as of January 2013.

- Purple Line: along Al Khail Road (E44). The line was proposed to extend from the Al Maktoum International Airport to Muhaisnah, a locality near the border between Dubai and Sharjah. There plan called for about eight stations, three with check-in facilities. However, The Dubai Airports Authority claimed that this was unfeasible as it did not pass through many localities. They however suggested opting for a "central terminal" similar to those in Europe where trains leave from inside the airport to the other airport with trains also leaving to the city.
- Pink Line: The Pink Line was planned to run east–west with a terminus at Al Sufouh and was scheduled for completion by 2030.
- Gold Line: Announced as the 'Yellow Line' in April 2008 and confirmed in January 2013 as the 'Gold Line'. One of the stations planned for the Gold Line is the Dubailand Station, west of Meydan. The Gold Line will connect Arabian Ranches, Deira, and Dubai Marina and is scheduled to open by 2025, however this was cancelled due to the financial crisis. In 2025, it was reported that the Gold Line will be rerouted to run parallel to the Red Line to ease congestion and deviate southwards at Business Bay to run past Dubailand, Global Village and Meydan.
- Red Line Extension: 15.5 kilometres (9.6 mi) and six new stations, running past Jebel Ali Port, Palm Jebel Ali, Dubai Waterfront and Ghantoot terminating at the border with Abu Dhabi. No dates for completion announced.

In 2014, the RTA approved the recent proposal of extending the Red Line from Al Rashidiya station to Mirdif City Center which will increase 3.5 kilometers with the new station. However, there is also a proposal to extend it further to Al Warqa'a which is currently being studied.

As of 2025, none of these extensions or proposed lines have been started or discussed and are currently indefinitely suspended until further notice.

On the Green Line, the RTA finalized the extension plan of 20.6 kilometers from Al Jaddaf to Academic City in 2014. The extension is due to go through Festival City, Lagoons, Ras Al Khor Industrial Area, International City, Dubai Silicon Oasis, and Dubai Academic City. This was later approved as the new Blue Line, which construction started in 2024 and is scheduled to open on 9 September 2029, to coincide with the 20 year anniversary of Dubai Metro.

In 2018, the engineering firm Aurecon produced a study into a 7.5 km express metro line from Al Qiyadah station on the Green Line till Al Nahda-2 Stn (Sharjah Metro). The line would cost AED 3 billion, and could reduce traffic congestion between the two cities by up to 30%.

In 2026, it was reported that RTA is planning to extend the Route 2020 section of the Red Line till the Al Maktoum International Airport.

In April 2026, the Gold Line of the metro was announced, with a route length of 42 kilometres (26 mi). It is scheduled to be opened on 9 September 2032.

== Stations ==
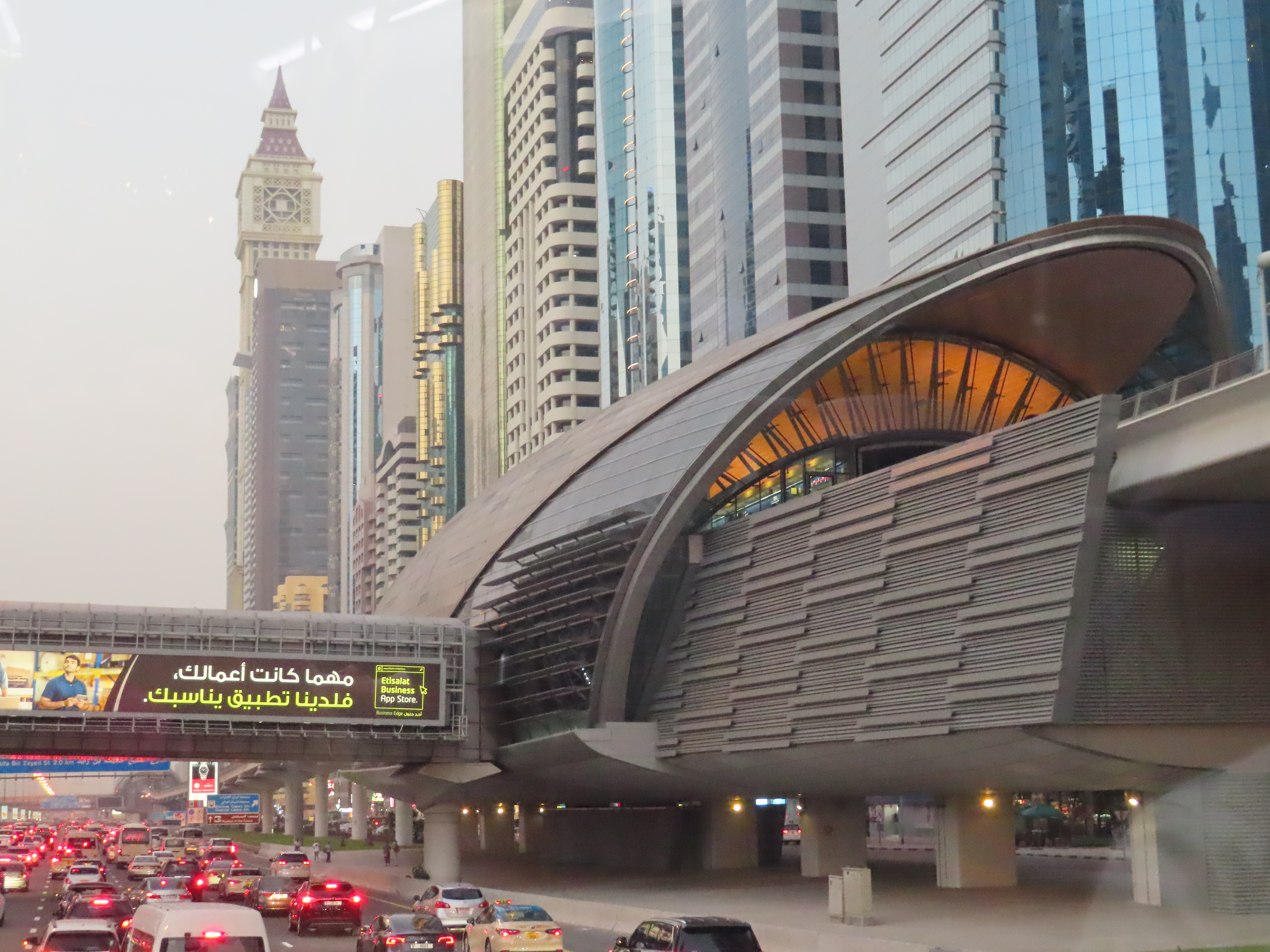
Financial Centre Station

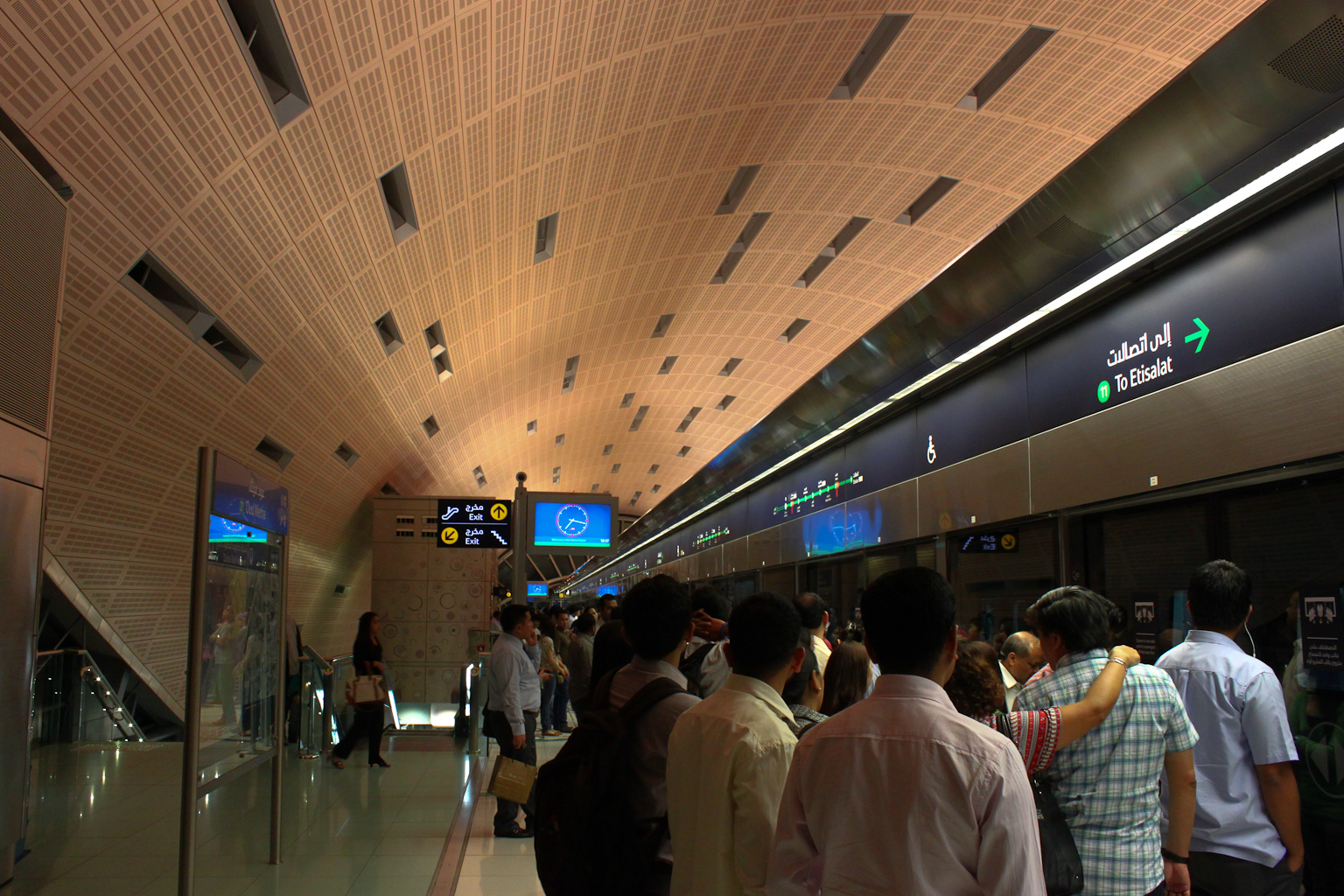
Interior of Oud Metha Station

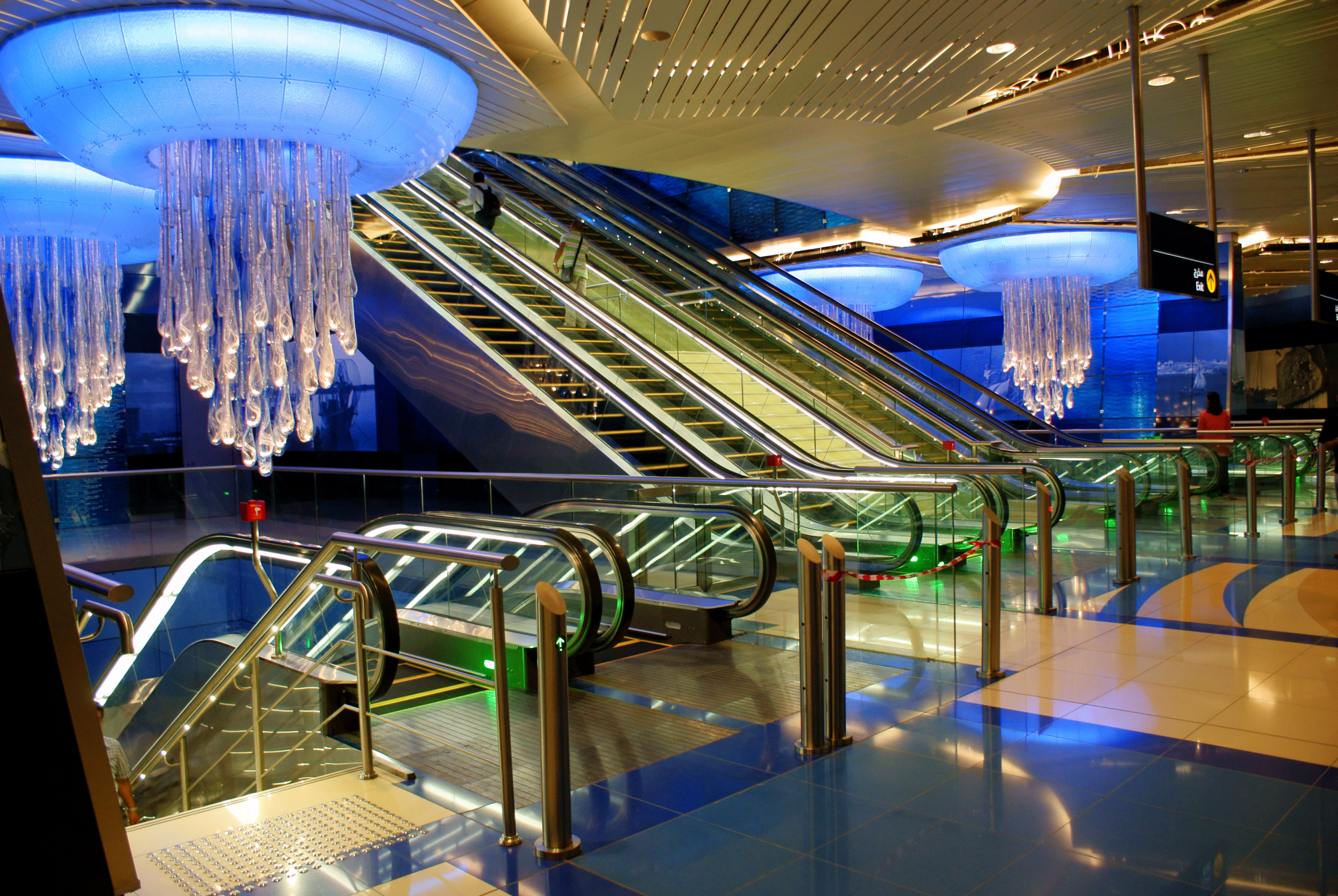
Interior of Bur Juman Station

Architecture firm Aedas designed the metro's 45 stations, two depots, and the operational control centres. The Al Ghurair Investment group were the metro's builders.

Dubai Metro is composed of at-grade (G) elevated Type 1, Type 2 and Type 3 (T1, T2 and T3, respectively) underground stations (U) and underground transfer station types (UT). Type 1 is the regular at-grade concourse station, Type 2 is a regular elevated concourse station, and Type 3 is an elevated special track station with an extra track to hold a non-operational train. Underground transfer stations accommodate both the Red and Green lines for easy transfers.

Besides these differences, there are five themes used in the interiors of the stations: The red line individually has 29 stations including the Interchange Stations between Green Line. The green line has 20 stations including the Interchange Stations between Red Line. Route 2020 (Connected with the Red Line from Jebel Ali) individually has 7 stations in total (including Jebel Ali; 6 without it).

Inside the stations will have air conditions from 24 to 21 Celsius.

1. Heritage: Symbolizes the culture and history of the United Arab Emirates.
2. Earth: Marks the start of the Dubai modern and urban drive, which resembles the force and durability of earth and soil.
3. Air: Symbolizes the elation and joy that Dubai provides to residents and visitors.
4. Fire: Symbolizes the energy, vigour and strong will displayed by Dubai leaders.
5. Water: Symbolizes the human values which Dubai seeks to ensure in its modern achievements.

The Earth stations have a tan-brown colour effects; water has blue-white colour effects; fire has orange-red colour effects; and the air has green colour effects.

Officials have negotiated with international and local companies over naming rights for 23 stations on the two lines. This corporate branding is the first of its kind. Some examples are: BurJuman, Burj Khalifa/Dubai Mall, Mall of the Emirates, DAMAC Properties and UAE Exchange.

Each station has a bus route with drop-off zones to the metro station as well as taxi lay by's.

=== Parking ===
The Dubai Metro has built three large multi-level car parking with an estimated capacity to accommodate more than 8,000 vehicles for the passengers where they can park their car and ride the metro.

Stations	Line	Spaces
Centrepoint (Rashidiya) Metro Station	Red Line	2700 cars
Life Pharmacy Metro Station	Red Line, Branch	3000 cars
e& Metro Station	Green Line	2300 cars
Jumeirah Golf Estates Metro Station	Red Line	400 cars

The parking is free for the metro users.

=== Handicap facilities ===
All metro stations have elevators and contrasting tactile guidance path to guide the visually impaired. There are also dedicated spaces for wheelchair users on all the trains. Handicapped passengers, also known as 'people of determination' in the UAE, can ride with any RTA service for free with a special, personalized Nol Card.

=== Safety ===
Emergency stop buttons, intercoms and platform screen doors with corresponding flashing light signals are installed at every station for the safety of the passengers. Trains are equipped with emergency stop buttons, door release levers, intercoms and fire extinguishers. CCTV is operational throughout the entire network and in trains and police officers are regularly on patrol in the stations, especially during rush hours.

=== Wi-Fi ===
Wi-Fi connectivity is available across all trains and stations and is provided by du which is in par with the Wi-Fi UAE program which provides Wi-Fi connectivity across major parts of UAE. Mobile phone coverage is available across the entire network of the metro. The metro itself has Wi-Fi connectivity inside for the commuters to access with two tiers of Internet access with the normal service being free whereas the premium service can be accessed by a nominal fee.

== Travelling ==
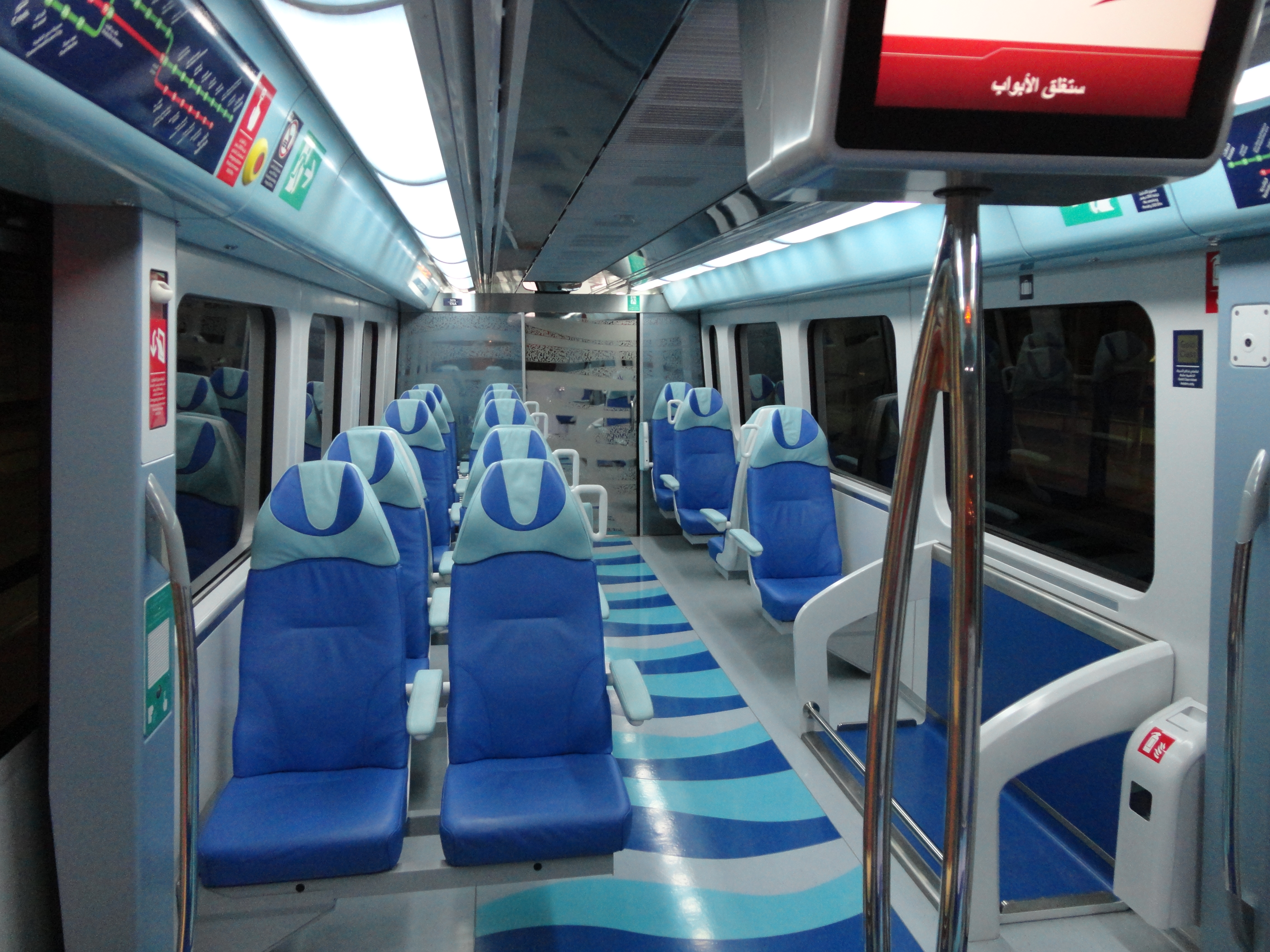
The interior of the "Gold Class" section of a train.

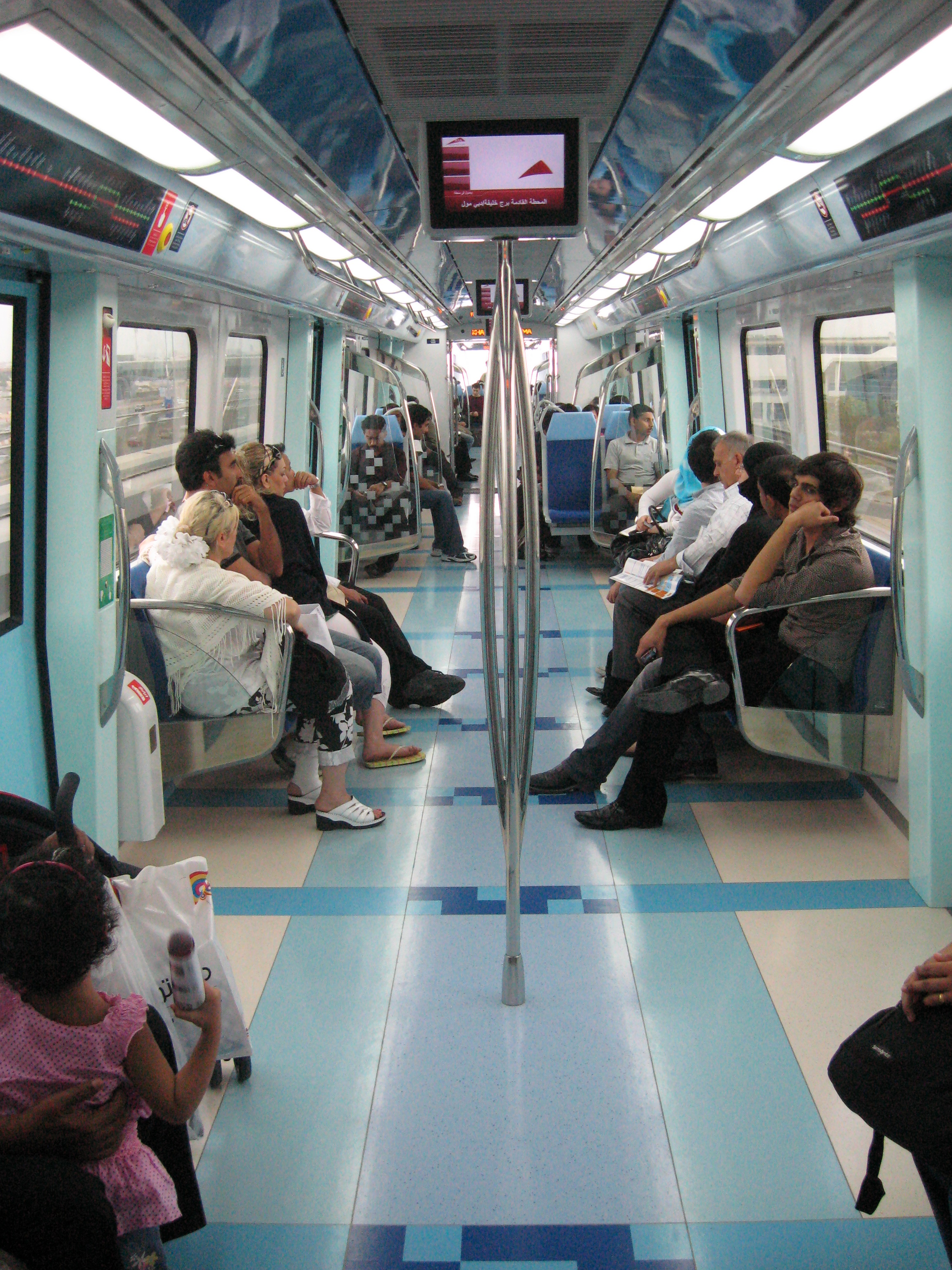
The interior of a normal cabin of a train.

The Dubai Transport is divided into 4 tiers (5 zones). The prices were slightly increased as of 11 November 2014. The cheapest ticket (not preloaded, and not in the "gold" class) with a distance not more than 3 km cost 3 AED (about $0.82) – the equivalent of Tier 0, and most costly single trip (Tier 3, exceed 2 zones, and paper not preloaded ticket also) 7.5 AED (about $2.04) and was not increased from opening. Tier 1 is one zone trip, where the travel exceeds 3 km, Tier 2 is neighbouring 2 zones travel. Also (excluding Gold class) using cards there is "no more paying" – a free rest of day travel if the cost exceeds 14 AED (about $3.81).

=== Ticketing ===
The Dubai Metro has a fixed fare based on three tiers and travelling under 3 km costs 3 AED. The tiers are:

Tiers (silver card)
Tier 1 |3 AED| Within 1 zone start and end in same zone
Tier 2 |5 AED| Starts in 1 zone and ends in neighboring zone
Tier 3 |7.5 AED| Crosses 3 or more zones

The Nol Card are used by the passengers to check-in and check-out at the gates in their destination station. No other payment form (cash, credit card) can be used. The fare will be automatically deducted based on the number of zones traveled. Passengers will be allowed to check-in when their card has more than minimum credit required.

Children below the age of 5 years or less than 90 cm and people with disabilities (personalized Nol Card required) will be eligible to travel the metro for free.

There is also a Nol Card available for students & seniors, and they can get a student & senior citizens' discount (usually half of the fare).

== Rolling stock ==
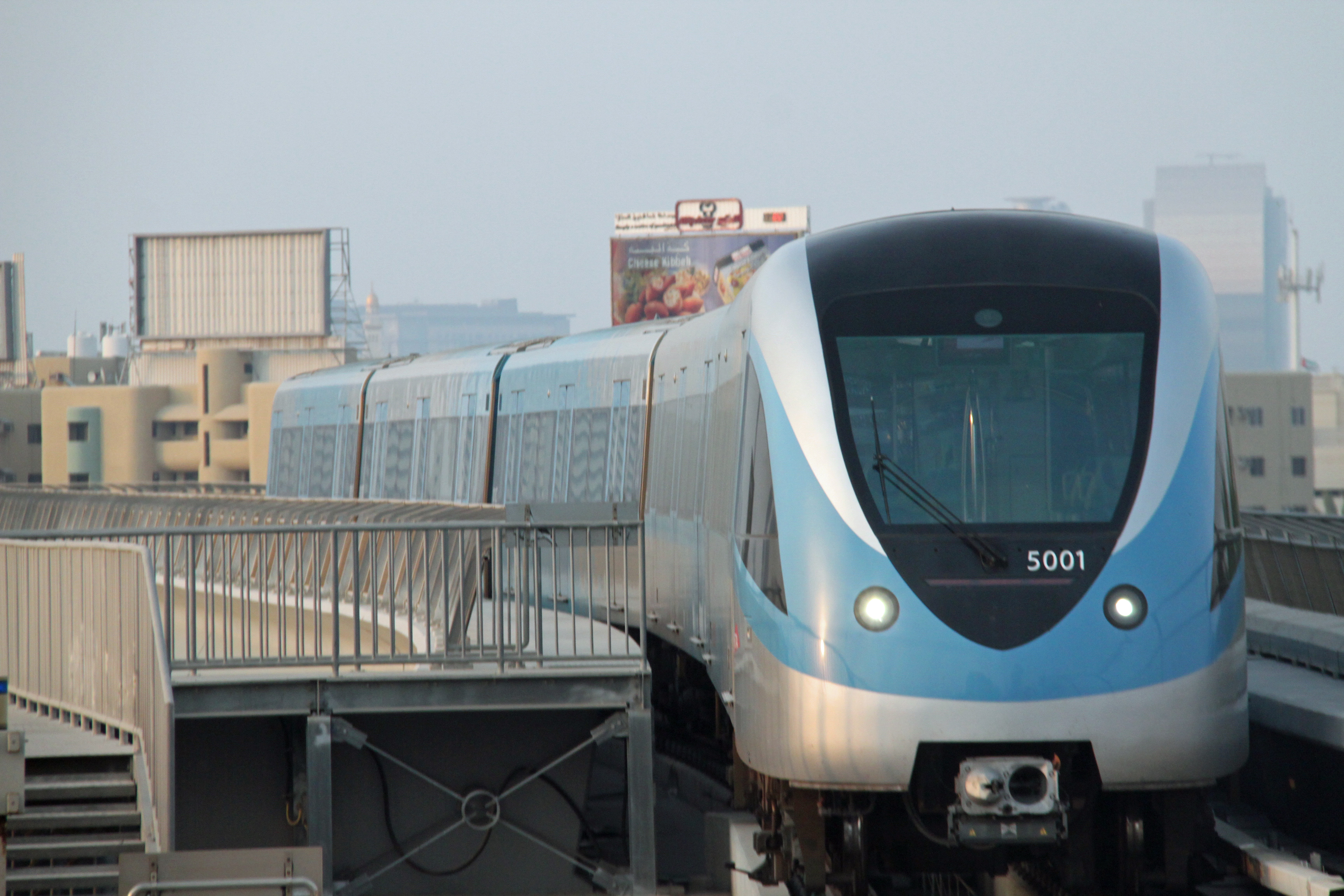
Train 5001 is the first train to be operated on Dubai Metro.

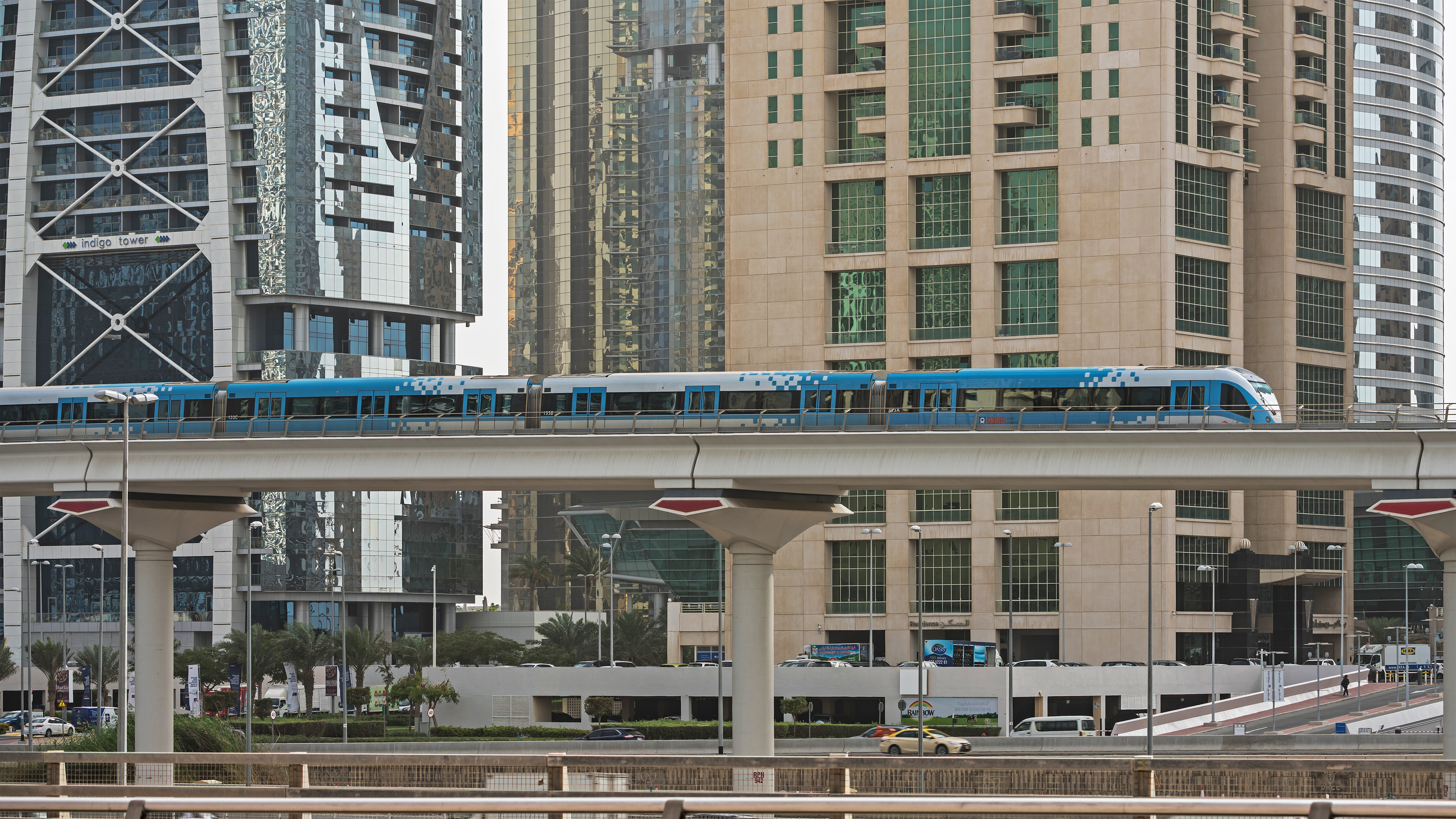
A metro train in Dubai Marina.

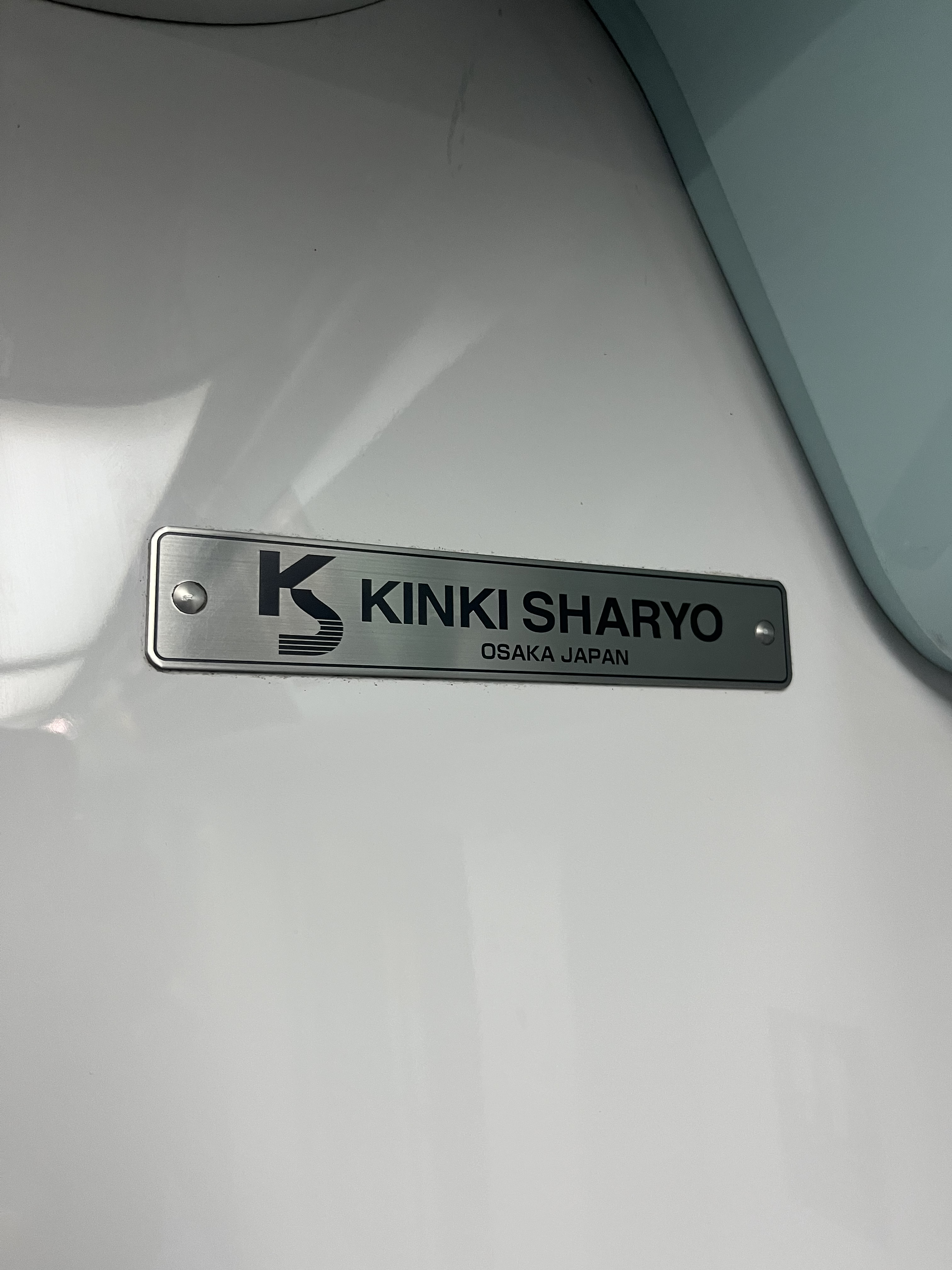
Builders plate of the Kinki-Sharyo built trains

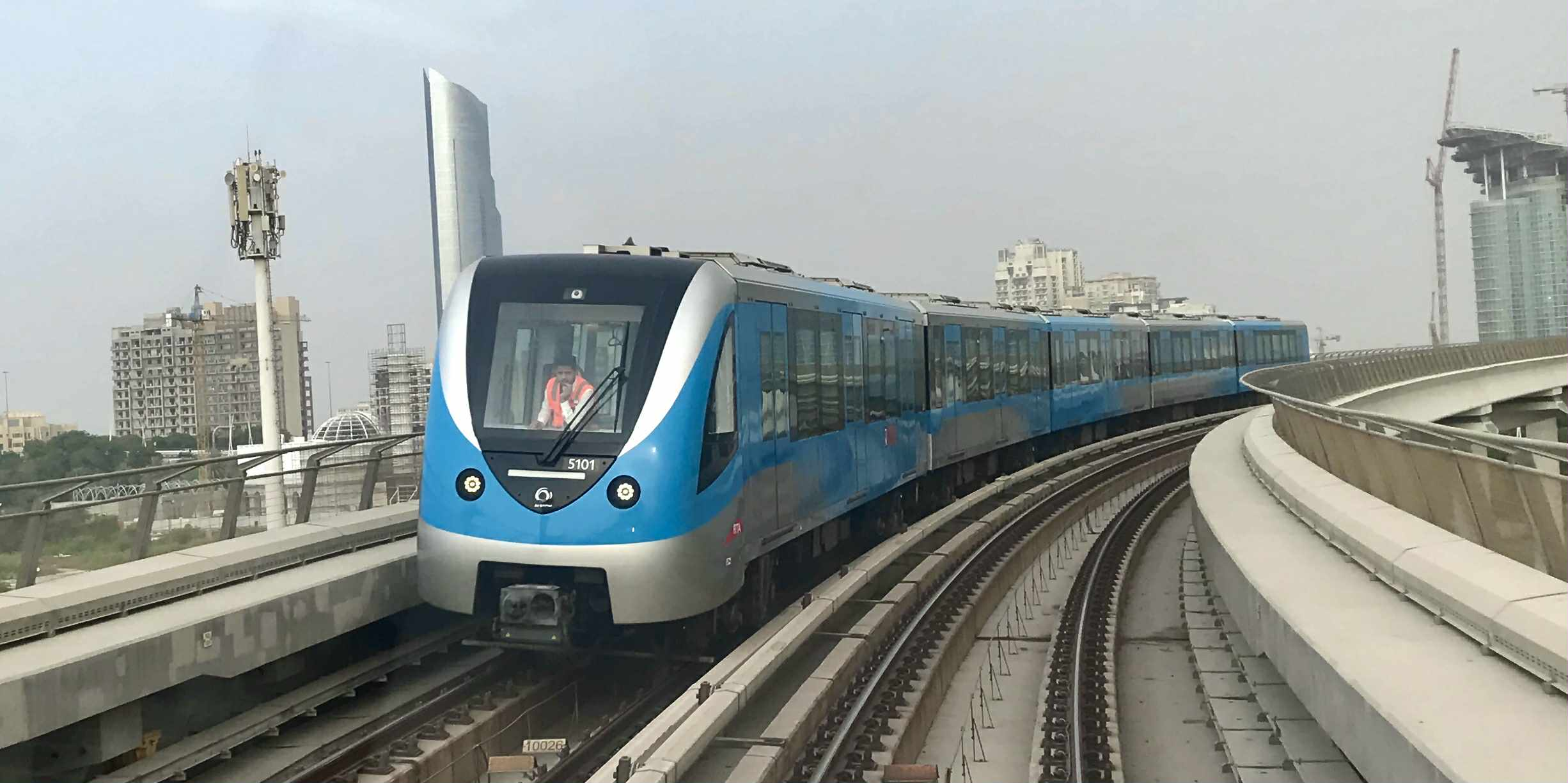
Train 5101 is the first Alstom-manufactured train to be operated on the Dubai Metro.

Japanese manufacturer Kinki Sharyo built a total of 79 five-car trains (60 on the Red Line, nineteen on the Green Line) for the system. Their fleet numbers are 5001 – 5079, and each train's cars are assigned a 3 digit number and a letter from A to E (The first car is assigned A; second is B; third is C; fourth is D; fifth is E: For example, train set 5001 consists of cars 101A, 101B, 101C, 101D and 101E). The trains are designed to carry 643 seated and standing passengers, and unusually for a mass transit system, the trains have three classes of accommodation: Gold Class (first class), the Women and Children only class, and the regular Silver Class (economy). The first train (Set 5001) was delivered to Dubai in March 2008. The trains are driverless, use third rail current collection. Trained wardens accompany passengers to help with emergencies. Four newer trains (Sets 5074, 5075, 5076, and 5077) are each painted with a different special livery, in which one of them (set 5077) representing the skyline of Dubai. Set 5041 was painted with a special Museum of the Future livery and to mark the 15th anniversary of the Dubai Metro, another metro train (set 5002) was painted with a special LEGO-themed livery. However, these liveries (excluding set 5041) are currently removed.

50 new trains, the Alstom Metropolis, were introduced in November 2018. These trains have higher capacity, 696 passengers, up from 643 passenger on the current trains. This will increase passenger capacity by about 10%. The new trains have a refreshed interior with better air conditioning, digital maps, improved speed, brakes and doors. Out of these 50 trains, all 50 are running on the Red and Green Lines (mostly the Green Line). The fleet numbers of the new Alstom trains are 5101 – 5150, and similar to the original Kinki Sharyo trains, each train's cars also are assigned a 3 digit number and a letter from A to E (for example, set 5122 consists of cars 222A, 222B, 222C, 222D and 222E).

== Culture ==
=== Music festival ===
Brand Dubai collaborated with Roads & Transport Authority in March 2019 to launch the "Dubai Metro Music Festival", there was no festival in 2020 and 2021 because of COVID-19. It is held across Red Line stations from 14 to 20 Sha'aban every year.

Year	Stations	Dates	Timings	Musicians	Nationalities	Instruments
2019	Union, BurJuman, Burj Khalifa / Dubai Mall, Mall of the Emirates, DMCC	17–23 March 2019	6am-12pm, 4pm-9pm (Union, BurJuman, Mall of the Emirates and DMCC), 12-4pm (Burj Khalifa / Dubai Mall)	Aksana Laukava, Vineet Panchal, PorcaPizza	Belarus, India, Italy	Saxophone, Tabla, Recycled One Man Band
2020	None because of COVID-19					
2021	None because of COVID-19					
2022	Union, BurJuman, Mall of the Emirates, Jabal Ali, Expo 2020	16–22 March 2022	4-10pm	Inass Halal, Christophe Servas, Al Taj, Jose Luis Torres	Syria, France, Egypt, Ecuador	Percussion, Flute and Recycled Instruments, Flute Beatbox, One Man Band
2023	Union, BurJuman, Financial Centre, Mall of the Emirates, Sobha Realty	6–12 March 2023	4-10pm	John Buttigieg, Anetta Morozova, Isabelle Clarençon	Australia, Russia, France	Guitar, Flute, DJ and Piano
2024	Union, BurJuman, Burj Khalifa / Dubai Mall, Mall of the Emirates, DMCC	21–27 September 2024	5-10pm			

=== Guinness World Record ===
On 1 November 2018, as part of the RTA's Public Transport Day, the longest diverse human chain of hand was formed in a Dubai metro train at Etisalat station. The record was acknowledged by Guinness World Records. The chain was formed by people from 96 countries around the whole world. Previously this record was with Norway, where 75 nations made a diverse human chain.

=== Dubai Metro Museum ===
Sheikh Mohammed bin Rashid Al Maktoum, Vice President and Prime Minister of the UAE and Ruler of Dubai, gave his directions to transform Dubai Metro stations into art museums under the supervision of Dubai Culture and Arts Authority. The project was announced in early April 2014 and aims to display contemporary and modern art.

== Incidents and accidents ==
- 10 September 2009: one metro train broke down and passengers were stranded for two hours before being picked up by a second train.
- 28 February 2010: Thousands of commuters were affected after part of Dubai Metro's Red Line was closed after a small fire on the track. A section of the Red Line between Al Jafiliya Station near Za'abeel Park and Terminal 3 Station was shut down at around 7 pm and remained closed until Monday morning. Trains were evacuated at Burjuman (formerly Khalid Bin Al Waleed), Union Station and Al Rigga Station. A Dubai Roads and Transport Authority (RTA) spokesman confirmed there was smoke on the underground track between Union and Burjuman Station. However, RTA officials remained tight-lipped about what had caused the incident.
- 25 December 2011: Passengers reported some trains stalling and others moving 'at snail's pace' due to technical problems. The RTA confirmed that both the Red and Green lines of the metro were running slow, in both directions, due to "some technical issues".
- 3 December 2012: The Dubai Metro saw its first death when a man committed suicide by lying down on the metro tracks and was run over by an automated train.
- 12 August 2014: Commuters on a segment of the Dubai Metro's Red Line were stranded after a train (registered 5075) stopped between Al Karama and Al Jafiliya stations during peak hours following a technical issue at around 7 pm. According to a Roads and Transport Authority (RTA) official, the train on the Red Line experienced an electrical failure, causing the metro to stall operations between the Union and Business Bay metro stations leaving 2000 passengers stranded. The Green Line operated as usual. The passengers stranded in the train broke the emergency door using a hammer and opened the door as there was no air conditioning available and walked along the viaduct to Al Karama Metro Station. Two hours later, the Metro services were fully restored.
- 29 October 2014: Commuters on the Dubai Metro were stranded at stations due to trains between Business Bay station and Nakheel station stopping in both directions due to a technical glitch. The systems were fully restored one hour later.
- 3 April 2016: Passengers were left stranded during evening rush hour after a technical issue delayed train services on the Red Line. Systems were restored 30 minutes later.
- 24 August 2017: A man commits suicide in Noor Bank Metro Station. The station was shut down for one hour following the incident.
- 6 November 2017: Passengers commuting on the Red Line were left stranded after a technical issue caused train services to stall temporarily near Jumeirah Lakes Towers (now DMCC) and UAE Exchange stations. Services returned to normal at 12:32 PM.
- 16 April 2024: Excessive flooding caused by heavy rain forced the closure of several metro stations, including Onpassive, Equiti, Mashreq (now Insurance Market), and Energy stations for several weeks. However, stations on Route 2020 stayed open.

== See also ==
- Nol Card
- Dubai Tram
- Transportation in Dubai
