= Roads & Transport Authority (Dubai) =

Government agency in the UAE

- هيئة الطرق والمواصلات

Agency overview
- Formed: November 1, 2005; 20 years ago
- Jurisdiction: Emirate of Dubai
- Headquarters: Al Garhoud, Dubai, United Arab Emirates
- Employees: 6,310 (2017)
- Annual budget: 7.61 billion AED (2016)
- Agency executives: Mattar Al Tayer, Director General and Chairman of the Board of Executive Directors; Maitha bin Adai, CEO of the Traffic and Roads Agency; Abdulla Al Ali, CEO of Licensing Agency; Abdul Muhsen Younes, CEO of the Rail Agency; Ahmed Bahrozyan, CEO of the Public Transport Agency; Mohammed Al-Mudharreb, CEO of Corporate Technology Support Services; Yousef Al Redha, CEO of Corporate Administration Support Services
- Website: www.rta.ae

Roads & Transport Authority (RTA) (Arabic: هيئة الطرق والمواصلات) is a Government of Dubai roads & transportation authority in Dubai, United Arab Emirates. It was founded in 2005 and is responsible for planning and executing transport and traffic projects, along with legislation and strategic plans of transportation in Dubai.

== History ==
RTA was established in 2005 by Law No. 17 - 2005. It was launched by the Vice President and Prime Minister of the UAE, and Emir of Dubai, Maktoum bin Rashid Al Maktoum with the mission of developing integrated, sustainable and world-class transportation systems for residents of Dubai. In 2012, RTA's Dubai Metro was declared by Guinness World Records to be the world's longest fully automated driverless metro system with a route length of 75 kilometres (47 mi).

== Administration system ==
The RTA is led by Director General and chairman of the Board of Executive Directors, Mattar Mohamed Al Tayer. The administration is divided into six different agencies or departments, each of which have their own directors and CEOs.

- Public Transport Agency
- Traffic and Roads Agency
- Rail Agency
- Licensing Agency
- Corporate Administrative Support Services
- Corporate Technology Support Services

== Metro, buses and trams ridership ==
RTA is a sole public transportation service provider which includes the Dubai Metro, Dubai Tram, Abras, Dubai Bus, Dubai Water Bus, Water Taxi and Dubai Ferry along with Dubai Taxi and its authorized taxi companies.

RTA operates approximately 1,442 buses on 107 routes, carrying almost 7 million riders on roughly 179,000 trips a month by the bus service; however the Dubai Metro is a driverless, fully automated metro rail system installed ubiquitously throughout the city. All trains and stations are air conditioned and equipped with and platform edge screen doors. The metro is divided into two lines, Red and Green; both lines together recorded a ridership of 164.3 million in 2014 as compared to 137.759 million in 2013 and 109.491 million in 2012.

The total ridership of Dubai's public transport reached 531.350 million in 2014.

Some of the buses are electric. However, these are only run as trial as of October 2023 with route eB1 being the only Electric Bus route in trial as of now.

== Services and technology ==
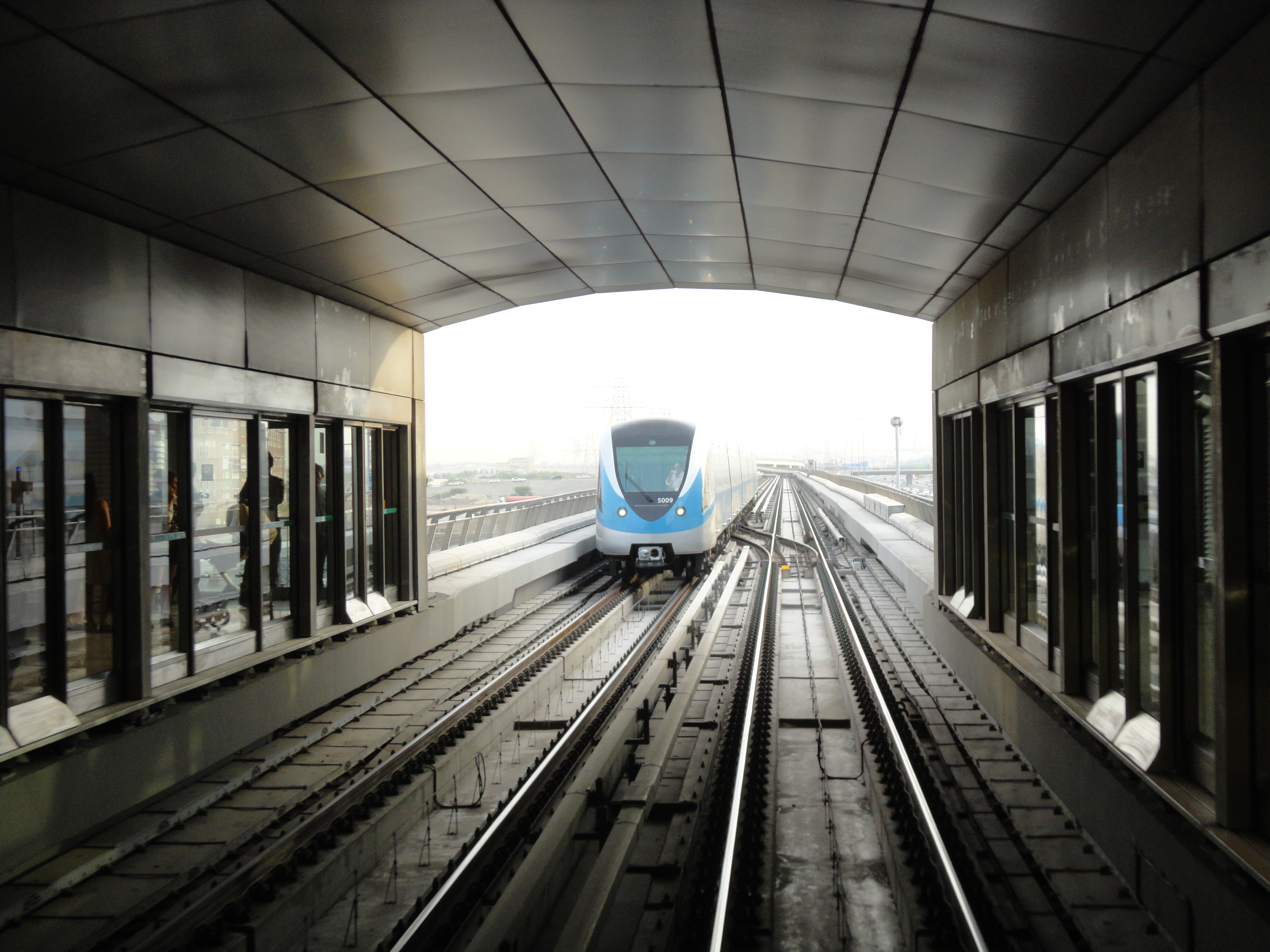
Dubai metro arriving in a station

The Roads and Transport Authority (RTA) of Dubai runs several services to meet Dubai residents needs. It has a mobile application and a dedicated website to provide access to the services listed below.

- Nol Card
- RTA Smart Drive
- Dubai Drive
- S'hail App
- Salama Magazine
- Smart Salik
- RTA Dubai
- Wojhati
- Nol Pay
- DTC Smart App
- RTA Card

== See also ==
- Dubai Tram
- Dubai Metro
- Dubai Air Taxi
- Nol Card
- Salik
- Transportation in Dubai
- List of roads in Dubai
- Palm Monorail
- Etihad Rail
