= GETZ Entertainment Centre =

Cancelled entertainment complex in Amsterdam, Netherlands

GETZ

General information
- Status: Never built
- Type: Mixed-use entertainment centre
- Location: ArenA Boulevard, Amsterdam-Zuidoost
- Coordinates: 52°18′42″N 4°56′40″E
- Cost: €250–300 million (estimates 2006–2010)

Technical details
- Floor area: 162,000 m^{2} (1,740,000 sq ft) (planned, 2007)

Design and construction
- Architect: The Jerde Partnership
- Developer: OMC (ING Real Estate Development, BAM Vastgoed, Ballast Nedam) with the City of Amsterdam
- Awards: EG Retail & Future Projects Award, leisure category (2007)

GETZ, or the GETZ Entertainment Center (an acronym of the Dutch Gezondheid, Entertainment, Theater en Zaken, "health, entertainment, theatre and business") was a planned entertainment and cultural complex on the ArenA Boulevard (now Johan Cruijff Boulevard) in Amsterdam-Zuidoost, Netherlands. The name was first used around 2000 for the whole leisure district planned around the Amsterdam ArenA; it later came to denote a single complex on one site on the boulevard. As last planned, designed by the Los Angeles firm The Jerde Partnership and developed by a consortium of ING Real Estate, BAM Vastgoed and Ballast Nedam, it was to combine music and theatre venues with a hotel, a casino, shops, restaurants, housing and parking. Its cultural venues were intended to give Zuidoost, which had very few cultural buildings, facilities of its own. In January 2010 the project stalled when the €300 million needed to build it could not be raised during the credit crisis; the project was later dropped.

== Background ==
The ArenA Boulevard area was one of Amsterdam's three designated centre areas, and the city aimed to make Zuidoost Amsterdam's second entertainment district. The development company OMC had been working on the area since 1996.

When the 14-screen Pathé ArenA multiplex, designed by Frits van Dongen of Architekten Cie, opened on 6 April 2000, NRC Handelsblad described it as the first of the attractions that would fill the area. Within a few years, theatres, a medium-sized pop venue, a discothèque, restaurants, shops, department stores and housing were to form a complete town centre. The area was to be themed around sport, with much of its retail space selling sport-related goods and services, and, on the assumption that sport is healthy, it had already been named the "GETZ Entertainment Center". Reviewing the cinema, the critic Bernard Hulsman predicted that the area's excellent accessibility would make it popular with suburban residents and that it would compete with Amsterdam's city centre. By 2002 the name referred to a planned complex of offices, homes, bars and restaurants, a theme park and several smaller theatre halls on a single site, where the music venue Paradiso and the Cosmic Theater already planned to perform.

=== Grace Theatre ===
That site was occupied by the Grace Theatre, a temporary steel structure decorated with painted canvas, with 1,200 seats, an orchestra pit and a 20 m (66 ft) fly tower, built for a musical about Grace Kelly. Its plans had taken the coming of GETZ into account: the businessman Bert Maas, who invested €8 million (about US$7.6 million) (Note: Converted at the 2002 average European Central Bank reference rate of US$0.946 per euro.) in the production, had leased the land from the city for just over two years, after which he intended to dismantle the theatre and rebuild it elsewhere in Europe. Construction of GETZ was then expected to begin in 2004.

After disappointing attendance, the producer, Maaster Theaterproducties, unexpectedly closed the theatre on 28 February 2002 and went bankrupt on 8 March. The bankruptcy left no money for demolition, and the city, which regarded a vacant building as bad for the area, looked for other productions to use it. In June 2002 the city's land company (Gemeentelijk Grondbedrijf), which owned the site, bought the building from the receiver for €650,000 (about US$615,000) and leased it for two and a half years, for €500,000 (about US$473,000), to the nearby Heineken Music Hall, which renamed it the Pepsi Chart Stage and planned some 200 events there. The Heineken Music Hall was to demolish the building itself at the end of 2004 to make way for GETZ. According to an ANP report, the city meant the theatre to fill the cultural gap in Zuidoost until GETZ opened, which it then put at 2004. The building, later known as the Pepsi Stage, remained in use well beyond that date.

== Plans ==
In December 2006 the City of Amsterdam signed a development agreement for GETZ with OMC (Ontwikkelings Maatschappij Centrumgebied), a partnership of ING Real Estate, BAM Vastgoed and Ballast Nedam Ontwikkelingsmaatschappij, with The Jerde Partnership as architect. The investment was put at about €250 million (about US$314 million), (Note: Converted at the 2006 average European Central Bank reference rate of US$1.256 per euro.) with construction to start in the first half of 2008 and completion in 2010–2011. The complex was to occupy the site of the Pepsi Stage, which was to be moved to Leidsche Rijn in Utrecht as a temporary replacement for the Vredenburg concert hall during its rebuilding. GETZ was to link the boulevard's existing entertainment and shopping facilities.

On 18 January 2007 aldermen Maarten van Poelgeest and Carolien Gehrels announced that the municipal executive had approved both GETZ and the neighbouring Music Dome, an event hall for 15,000 visitors, with a combined investment of more than €300 million (about US$411 million). (Note: Converted at the 2007 average European Central Bank reference rate of US$1.371 per euro.) The proposal would give Zuidoost venues large and small, some intended to have an international profile; the concert promoter Mojo and Paradiso were involved in the programming. The location had been contested for years, as the borough of Noord had also wanted a Music Dome, at the end of the North–South metro line. The city expected GETZ to create about 2,500 jobs, held by some 9,000 full- and part-time workers, and the housing association De Key was to build homes in the area. In April 2007 Gehrels, the culture alderman, who spoke of an "Amsterdam Renaissance" when the Rijksmuseum, the Stedelijk Museum and other closed museums would reopen in 2009–2010, listed GETZ among the city's many other cultural building projects; the Amsterdam Arts Council estimated that all the plans together would require €7–11 million a year in additional subsidy.

GETZ was to consist of several buildings. Its cultural venues were to be a Music Centre, whose main hall could hold 1,500 seated or 2,500 standing, (Note: In April 2007 NRC Handelsblad described it as a pop hall for 2,500 visitors, and in 2010 Het Parool as a music theatre with 2,500 seats.) and a Culture Cluster (Cultuurcluster) of smaller halls where new talent could start out. The Music Centre was to become the second permanent home of the Holland Symfonia orchestra, with twenty concerts a year, and host educational projects and multicultural and crossover programming with the Cosmic Theater. Holland Symfonia's involvement lowered the expected operating subsidy. The complex was also to include a hotel, a bowling alley, a discothèque, bars and restaurants, shops, apartments and possibly a casino. In November 2007, by which time the plans totalled 162,000 m^{2} (1,740,000 sq ft) and completion was expected in 2011, GETZ won the leisure category of the EG Retail & Future Projects Awards, presented at the MAPIC retail property fair.

=== Culture Cluster ===
The Culture Cluster was to be run by the ZO! Cultuur foundation, an initiative of Paradiso, the Cosmic Theater and the migration heritage centre Imagine IC. According to Marjo van Schaik, the foundation's director from 2006, ZO! Cultuur was set up in 2004, and the cluster, modelled on arts centres in the United States, was meant to be a professional cultural centre for Zuidoost with a theatre hall, a music venue and exhibition space, in which local residents would feel recognised and take "ownership"; its policy papers described it as "a cultural epicentre" and "a community centre on a global level". Van Schaik, formerly director of theatre organisation at the National Opera and Ballet, led it until 2010 and was responsible both for its programming, staged in temporary venues across Zuidoost, and for developing and funding the new building. In 2009 the Amsterdam Court of Audit (Rekenkamer Amsterdam) included the GETZ cultural cluster among the subsidy applications whose finances it reviewed.

=== Casino ===
A casino, possibly a branch of Holland Casino, was to take a central place in the complex. When the plans were approved in January 2007, Henk de Boer, leader of the CDA group in the Zuidoost district council, objected. He argued that in a district where a quarter of households lived below the poverty line, some 900 households used the food bank each week and hundreds of evictions took place each year, a casino would be too great a temptation, comparing it to a bottle of syrup used to trap wasps, and urged the city to "find another source of money to finance GETZ".

== Cancellation ==
Construction was due to start around the turn of 2010. On 13 January 2010, at the district's New Year's reception, Zuidoost district chair Elvira Sweet announced that the €300 million (about US$398 million) (Note: Converted at the 2010 average European Central Bank reference rate of US$1.326 per euro. The sources give differing totals: about €250 million for GETZ in 2006, more than €300 million for GETZ and the Music Dome together in 2007, and €300 million for GETZ in 2010.) needed for GETZ could not be raised because of the credit crisis, and expressed her disappointment that the financiers were holding back. The project was by then being developed by the municipal development company (OGA) with ING, BAM and Ballast Nedam in the OMC partnership. An OGA spokesperson confirmed that financing had not been secured but denied that GETZ had been shelved, suggesting that it might be split into parts and built in phases. The Music Dome had secured its financing before the crisis; the spokesperson also called it a far less complex project, observing that when more parties are involved, "they tend to sit and wait for each other". It opened in mid-2012 as the Ziggo Dome.

Reporting new plans for the site in 2017, Architectenweb noted that GETZ had been dropped during the crisis for lack of money. According to ZO! Cultuur's former director, the commercial partners withdrew, ending the whole complex, including the Culture Cluster; the experience prompted her later study of new cultural venues in Amsterdam, Spaces of Culture (2018).

== Later development of the site ==
In April 2017 the municipality announced the Urban Interactive District for the vacant 2.5 ha (6.2 acres) site next to AFAS Live, with a programme similar to that of GETZ: about 700 homes, offices, a theatre, a pop venue the size of Paradiso or the Melkweg, and a hotel. In 2018 the city signed an agreement with OMC, by then a partnership of AM, Ballast Nedam and ING; MVRDV was commissioned for the urban design and Neutelings Riedijk Architects for the theatre and hotel.

The project, developed by AM and Ballast Nedam Development, was later renamed Eleven Square. As announced in January 2026, it comprises about 170,000 m^{2} (1,800,000 sq ft) of floor space, (Note: MVRDV's project page gives 138,500 m^{2} (1,491,000 sq ft).) more than 1,100 homes and a musical theatre and hotel (Eleven Stay), with a 43-storey, 145 m (476 ft) tower that would be Amsterdam's tallest residential building. Construction of the first phase was expected to start in the second quarter of 2026, with completion around 2029.
