= Dubai Mall =

Shopping mall in Dubai, UAE

- دبي مول
- The exterior of the Dubai Mall (2023)
- Location: Downtown Dubai, United Arab Emirates
- Coordinates: 25°11′51″N 55°16′45″E
- Address: The Dubai downtown
- Opened: 4 November 2008; 18 years ago
- Developer: Emaar Properties
- Manager: Emaar Malls Group
- Architect: DP Architects
- Num. of stores: 1,200+
- Num. of anchor tenants: 2
- Floor area: 350,000 m^{2} (3,800,000 sq ft)
- Floors: 4
- Parking: 14,000+
- Public transit: Burj Khalifa/Dubai Mall Red Line
- Website: www.thedubaimall.com

Dubai Mall (Arabic: دبي مول, lit. 'Dubai Mall') is the largest shopping mall in Dubai. The mall is part of Downtown Dubai and is located adjacent to the Burj Khalifa. It includes over 1,200 shops.

== History ==
Dubai Mall was inaugurated on 4 November 2008, with about 1,000 retailers.

In 2011, Dubai Mall was the most visited building in the world, and it attracted over 54 million visitors.

In January 2023, the shopping mall announced that it was officially changing its name from "The Dubai Mall" to "Dubai Mall". Dubai Mall received a record 105 million visitors in 2023, a jump of over 19 percent from the previous year, which had 88 million visitors.

In June 2024, real estate developer Emaar Properties announced a 1.5 billion dirham ($408 million) expansion of the Dubai Mall.

== Statistics ==
Dubai Mall recorded 61,000 tickets sold for the Dubai Aquarium and Discovery Centre in the first five days, following its opening. Dubai Mall hosted over 37 million visitors in 2009, and attracts more than 750,000 visitors every week. In 2010, it had 47 million visitors, and saw an increase in foot traffic of about 27 percent over 2009, despite the economic crisis (a consequence of the real estate bubble burst). In 2012, Dubai Mall continued to hold the title of the world's most-visited shopping and leisure destination, and attracted more than 65 million visitors, an increase of more than 20 percent compared to the 54 million recorded in 2011. It attracted more visitors than New York City which welcomed over 52 million visitors that year, and Los Angeles which had 41 million visitors. The number also surpasses visitor arrivals to all landmark leisure destinations and theme parks in the world including Times Square (39.2 million), Central Park (38 million), and Niagara Falls (22.5 million).

Number of visitors (in millions)
2009	2010	2011	2012	2013	2014	2015	2016	2017	2019
39	47	54	65	75	80	92	80	80	84

== Description ==
Dubai Mall outside view with Burj Khalifa in the background

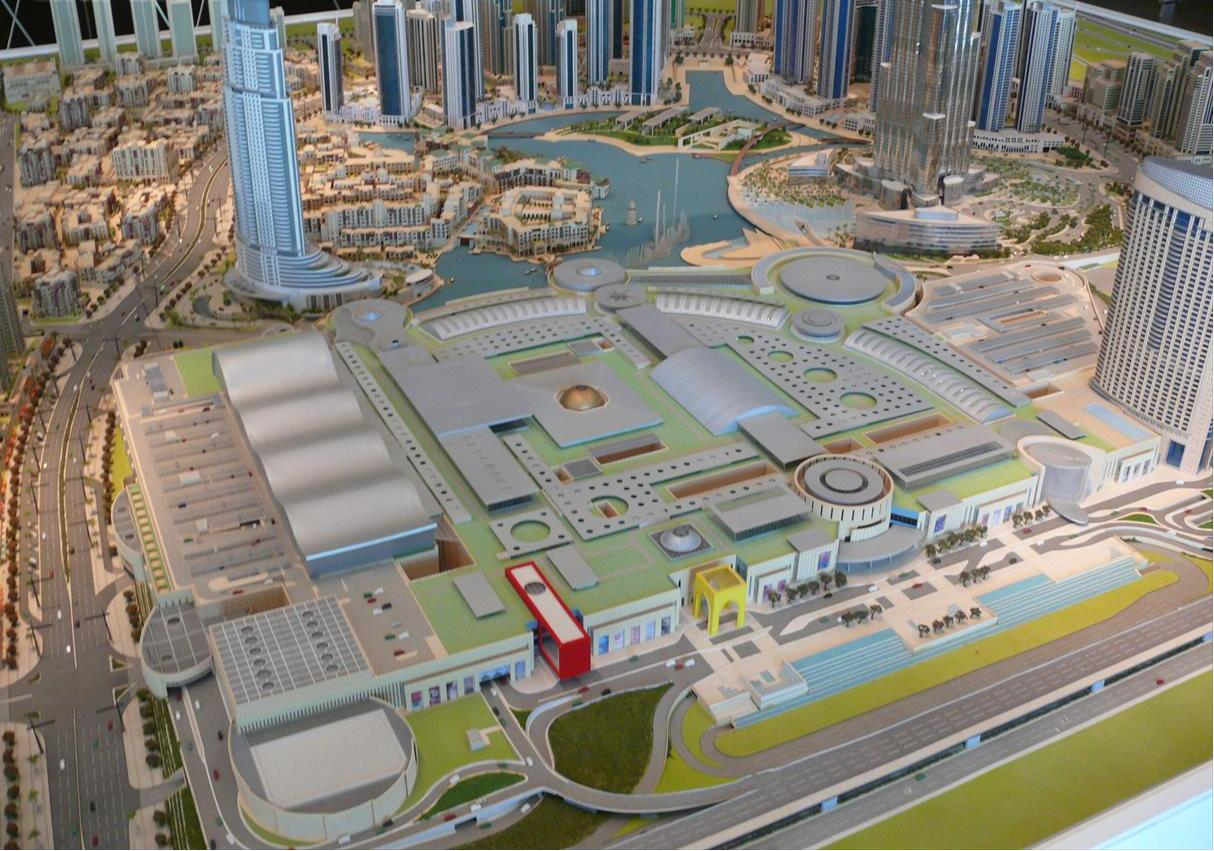
A downscaled model of the Dubai Mall during its construction phase

At over 13 million square feet (1,200,000 m^{2}) (equivalent in size to more than 50 football pitches), Dubai Mall has a total internal floor area of 5.9 million square feet (550,000 m^{2}) and leasable space of 3.77 million square feet (350,000 m^{2}), about the same as the West Edmonton Mall.

It also has 22 cinema screens, plus 120 restaurants and cafes. The mall has over 14,000 parking spaces across 3 car parks, with valet services and a car locator ticketing system. The mall has won five awards – two awards at the Retail Future Project Awards at Mapic, Cannes, in 2004, for Best Retail Development Scheme (Large) and Best Use of Lighting in a Retail Environment, and the Dubai Mall brochure collected three awards at the Summit Creative Awards 2005 in Portland, Oregon – the Gold award for: Best Art Direction / Graphic Design, Silver award for Best 4-colour B2B Brochure, and a Judges Special Recognition award.

The Mall also features an Olympic-sized ice rink for recreational skating and Emirates Ice Hockey League games, as well as the Emirates A380 Experience, an Airbus A380 aircraft simulator.

== Attractions ==
=== Dubai Aquarium and Underwater Zoo ===
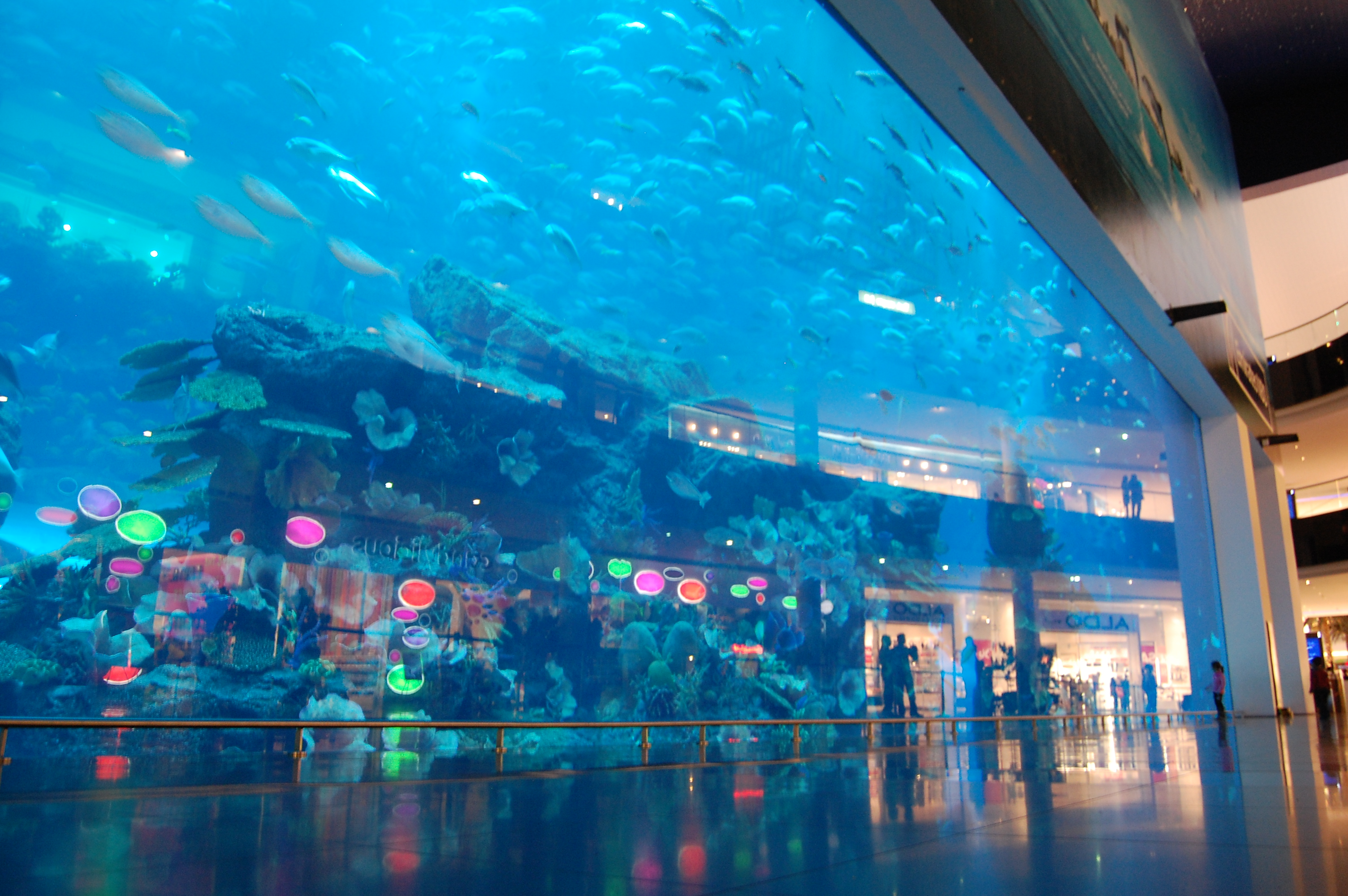
Dubai Aquarium and Underwater Zoo

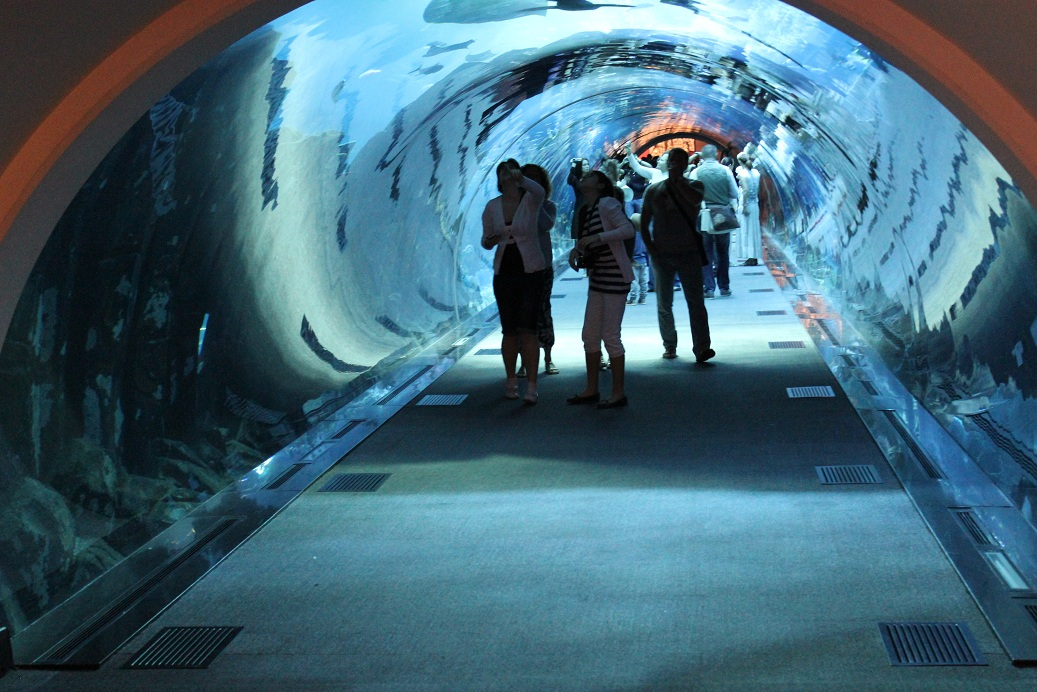
Tunnel of Dubai Aquarium & Underwater Zoo

The Dubai Aquarium & Underwater Zoo by Emaar Entertainment, was designed by Peddle Thorp. The aquarium, located in Dubai Mall, showcases more than 300 species of marine animals, including sharks and rays. It mainly presents bio-diversity in different ecological zones, including Rainforest, Rocky Shore and Living Ocean. The aquarium was awarded the ‘Certificate of Excellence’ and won the ‘Images Most Admired Retailer of the Year – Leisure & Entertainment’ at the Images RetailME Awards 2012.

=== Play DXB ===
Play DXB is an amusement park that was formerly known as VR Park Dubai.

The 76,000-square-foot (7,100 m^{2}) indoor park is an indoor virtual reality attraction. It features 15 rides and amusement games, including motion simulators, classic carnival games, skill games, and redemption games.

The park is based around VR and arcade games. There is an inflatable playground as well as trampolines, aimed at younger children. Older children can play VR games using a Quest 2 gaming headset.

It is in the same place as where Sega Republic used to be. The theme park closed on 1 June 2017, after the license to the Sega theme expired. It later reopened in February 2018 as a theme park dedicated to virtual reality under the name of VR Park Dubai. In 2022, the park was renamed to Play DXB.

=== Reel Cinemas ===
Reel Cinemas is a 22-screen cinema that is managed by Emaar Entertainment. The megaplex holds four cinema suites and 17 commercial halls, including the first THX-certified cinema in Dubai.

=== Dubai Fountain ===
The Dubai Fountain is located outside the mall, near the Burj Khalifa. This is one of the world’s largest choreographed fountain systems, featuring water shows synchronized with music and lights. The fountain has 25 color projectors and 1,000 water expressions. The fountain has five circles and when active 22,000 gallons of water are airborne. It includes 6,600 lights and water jets which activate in time with music.

=== Hysteria ===
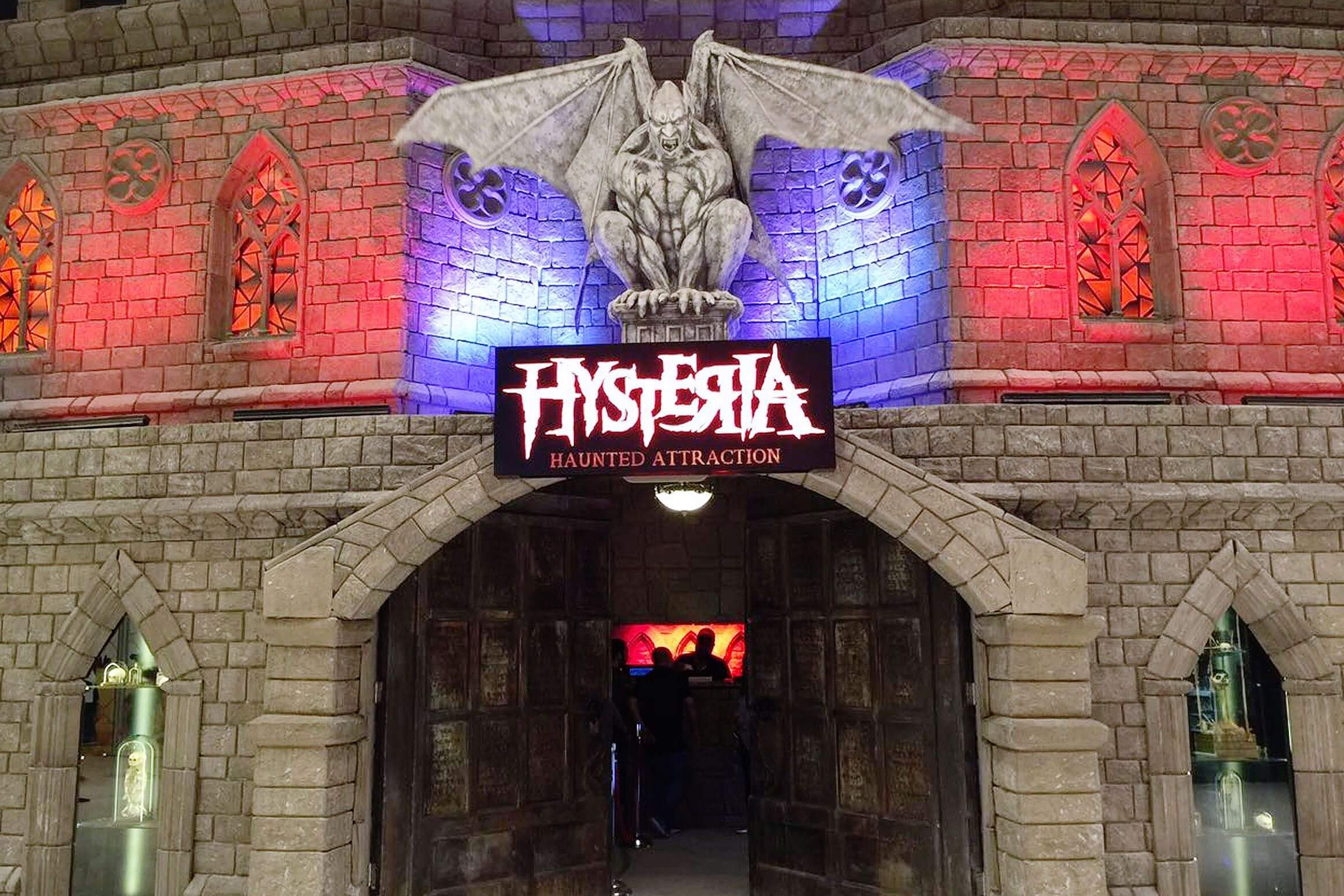
Hysteria Dubai Mall

Hysteria is a haunted house that is decorated with special effects, fog lights, and strobe lights. The story of Hysteria revolves around a family whose child mysteriously disappeared. They believe that the guest knows where their child is, so they attempt to kidnap the guest or guests.

=== Dubai Dino ===
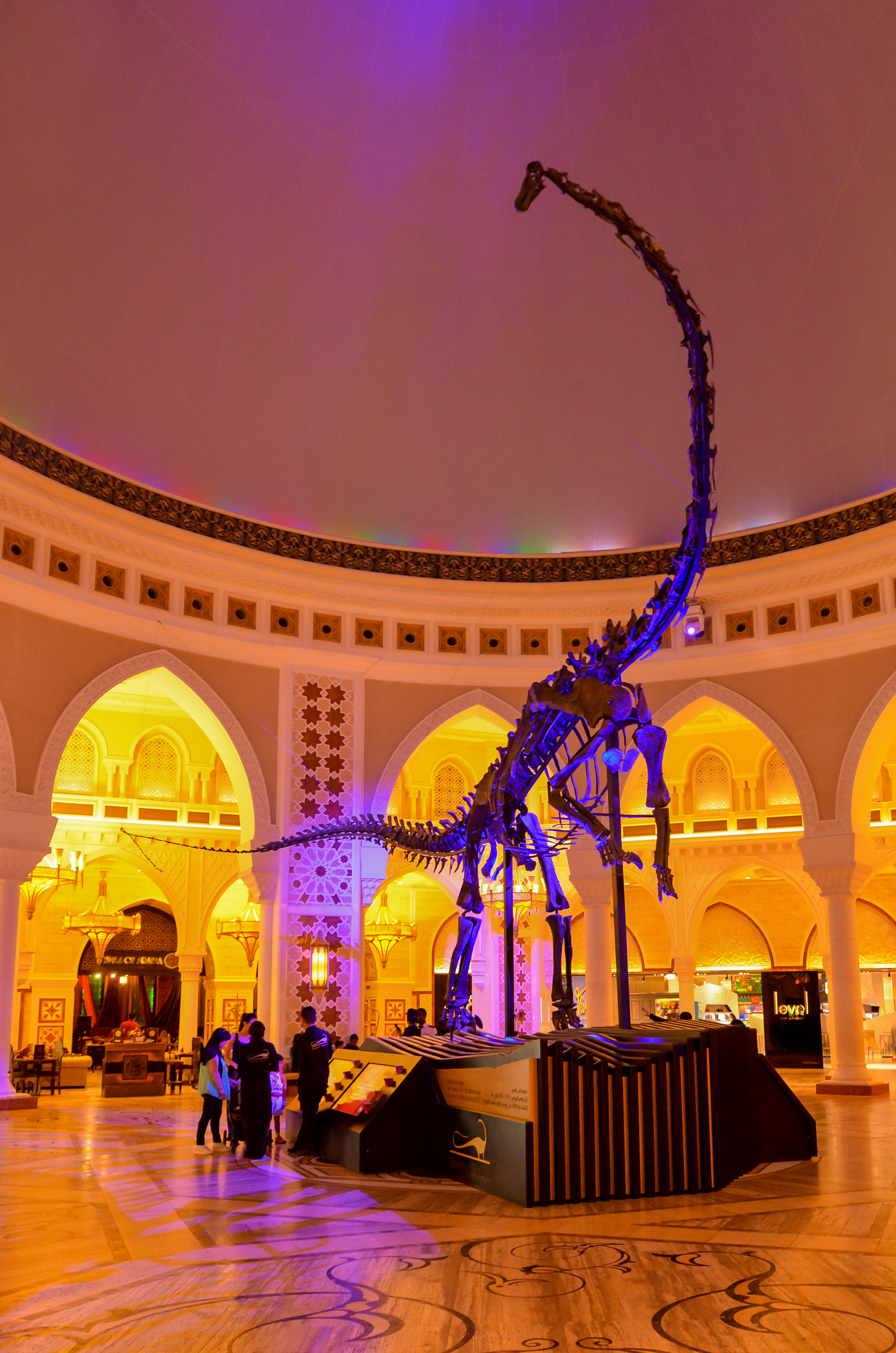
Dubai Dino

Dubai Dino is an actual fossil of Diplodocus. The total measurement of the Dino is over 7 metres (23 ft) in height, and 24 metres (79 ft) in length.

=== Dubai Creek Tower Replica ===
The Dubai Mall's Grand Atrium is home to a replica of the Dubai Creek Tower, which is currently under construction. The model will give a 3D rendition of the completed tower's architecture.

=== KidZania ===
KidZania is an interactive children-sized edutainment theme park. Kidzania is a 7,000m² scaled replica of Dubai that combines entertainment and education, with over 70 real-life activities for children aged 4–16. Children can learn about different jobs through role-play.

== Construction ==
In October 2004, Emaar Properties awarded the construction contract for building The Mall to a joint venture of Dutco Balfour Beatty, Al Ghandi/CCC and Turner Construction.

=== Metro Link ===
In December 2012, Emaar Properties announced the completion of the Metro Link, an 820-metre-long (2,690 ft) elevated, air-conditioned footbridge that connects the Burj Khalifa/Dubai Mall Metro station to the mall.

=== Expansion ===
In June 2013, Dubai Mall commenced phase one of its expansion plan by increasing the total retail floor area by 1 million square feet (93,000 m^{2}). so as to accommodate more visitors. The project was completed in 2018.

In June 2024, Emaar Properties announced the building’s expansion plan, which will add 240 new stores and restaurant venues.

== World records and achievements ==
Dubai Mall near the fountain at dusk

- Largest mall in the world by the total land area of 1,124,000 m^{2} (12,100,000 sq ft).
- 20th-largest mall by Gross Leasable Area (GLA) of 350,000 m^{2} (3,800,000 sq ft).
- World's largest acrylic panel (Aquarium) inside Dubai Mall, which is (32.88 m (107.9 ft) wide × 8.3 m (27 ft) high × 750 mm (75 cm; 30 in) thick and weighing 245 tonnes (245,000 kg; 540,000 lb)).
- Dubai Mall records more than 5 million visitors in March 2010 during the one-month Dubai Shopping Festival, setting a record in visitor footfall.
- Dubai Mall was named the best shopping experience on 29 April 2010 by Grazia Style Awards.
- The Dubai Mall hosted a record 37 million visitors in its first year of operation in 2009, and attracts more than 750,000 visitors every week.
- Dubai Mall hosted a record 47 million visitors in 2010, and broke the record of 37 million visitors received in the previous year, an increase of 27 percent despite the economic crisis.
- In 2011, Dubai Mall became the world's most-visited shopping and leisure destination, and attracted more than 56 million visitors, an increase of 15 percent from the visitors of the previous year.
- In 2012, Dubai Mall continued to hold title of world's most-visited shopping and leisure destination, and attracted more than 65 million visitors, an increase of more than 20 percent compared to the 54 million recorded the previous year, 2011.
- In 2017, Dubai Mall unveiled the world's largest OLED screen.

== Incidents ==
- On 25 February 2010, an aquarium that held sharks sprung a leak which led many shops to temporarily close down and forced shoppers to evacuate the mall immediately. It reopened the following day.
- In March 2015, more than a hundred foreign labourers protested in front of Dubai Mall due to overtime wages not being paid, causing disruption to traffic in the area.
- On 31 December 2015, guests of The Address Downtown Hotel were evacuated into the mall due to a fire.
- In December 2016, British TV presenter Richard Hammond drove a tank into the Dubai Mall as part of a military coup for The Grand Tour.
- On 24 April 2017, a power outage occurred, causing the mall to go into a blackout for 90 minutes. No other nearby areas were affected.
- In November 2019, due to heavy rain, large areas of the mall were flooded.
- All malls in Dubai, other than those selling essential goods, were forced to close starting 25 March 2020 due to the COVID-19 pandemic in the United Arab Emirates. The Dubai Mall was eligible to reopen 24 April 2020, but delayed its reopening until May.

== In popular culture ==
Dubai Mall was featured in the documentary show called Megastructures that aired on the National Geographic Channel. The mall was also featured in the BBC One programme, The Apprentice (UK series nine) and Week 5: Dubai Discount buying, where the candidates had to purchase items for the least amount of prices by utilising their negotiation skills.

== Gallery ==
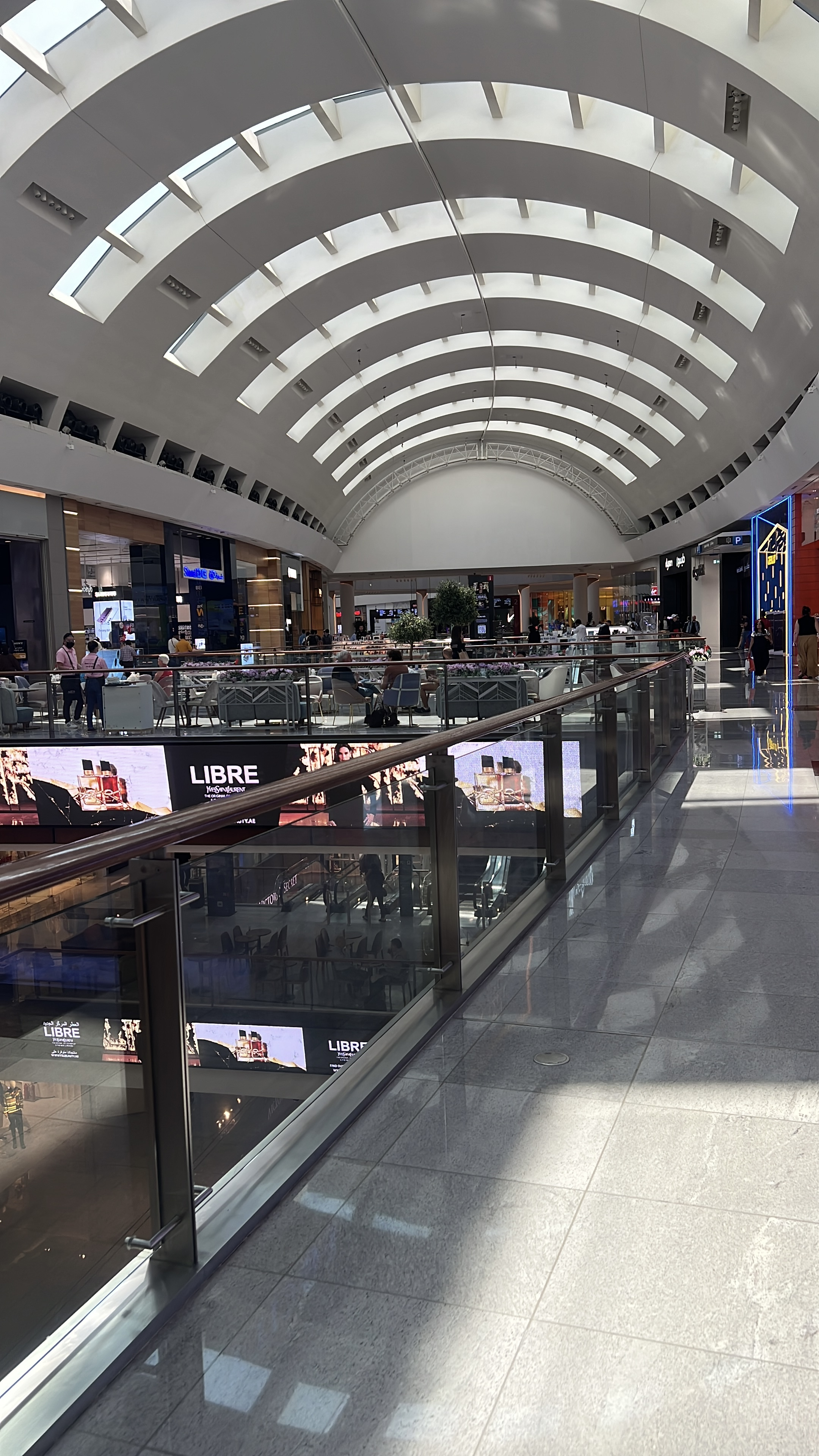
The Dubai Mall's interior

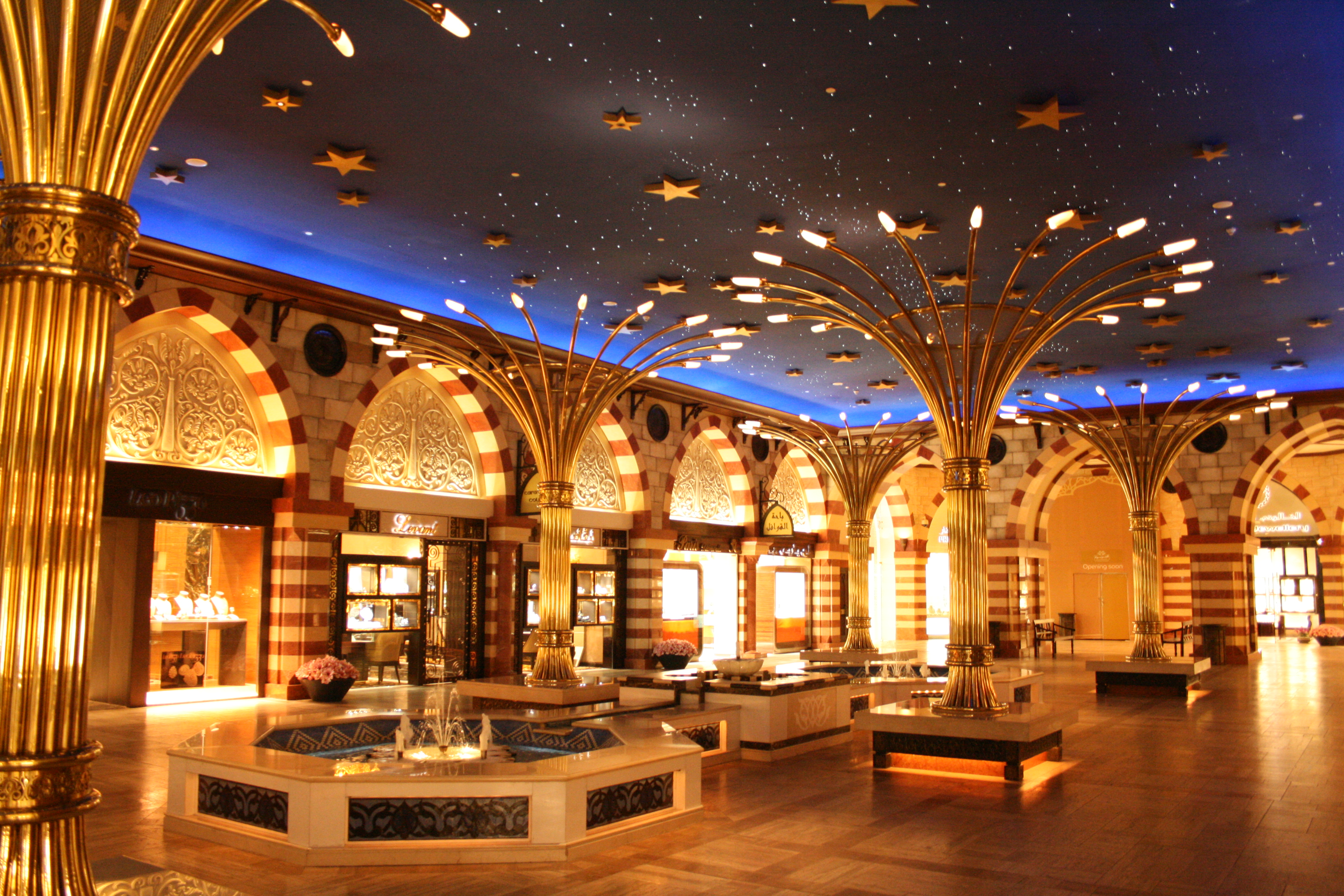
Dubai Mall's Gold Souk

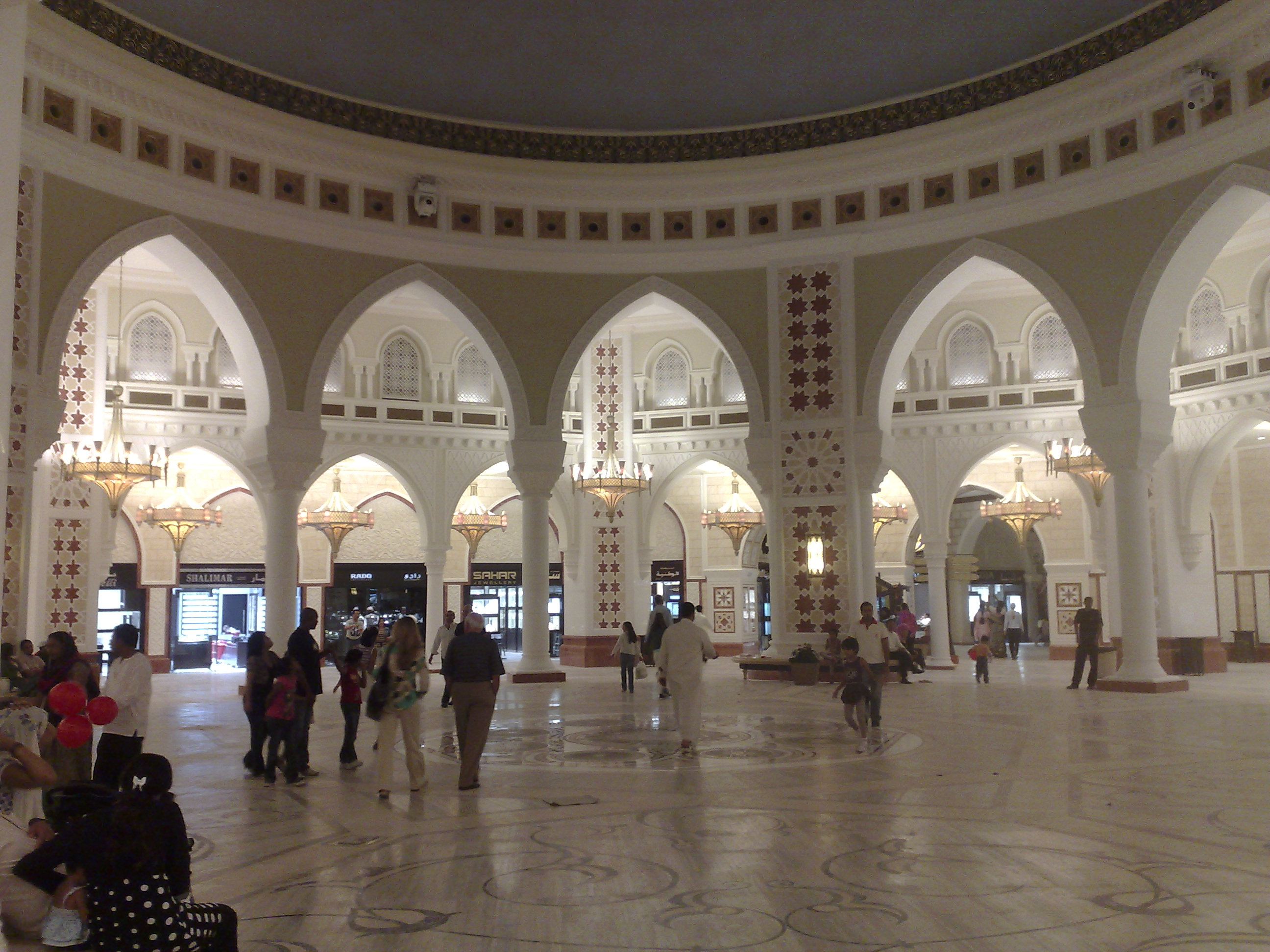
Another view of the Dubai Mall's gold souk

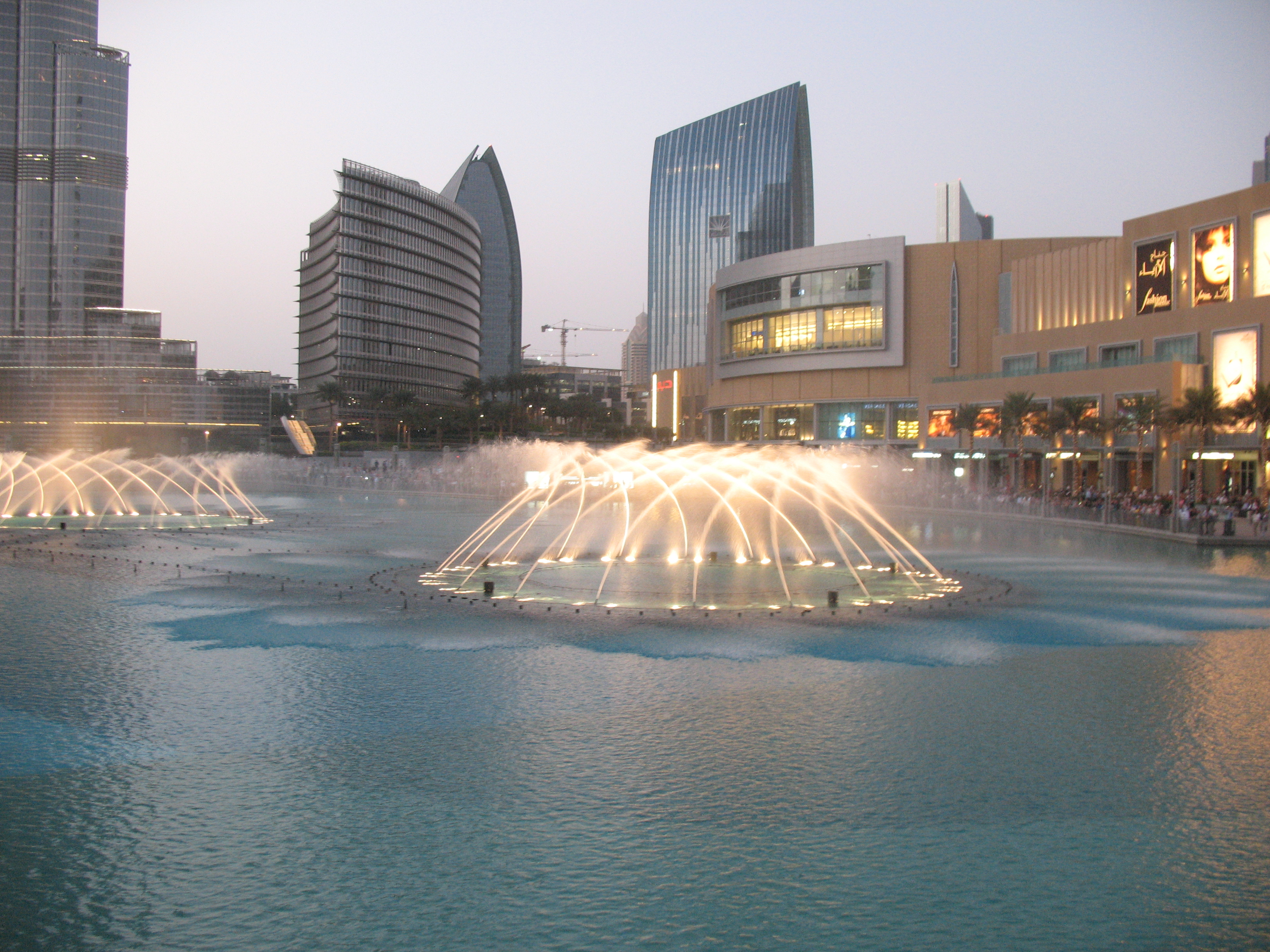
Dubai Mall as seen with Dubai Fountains

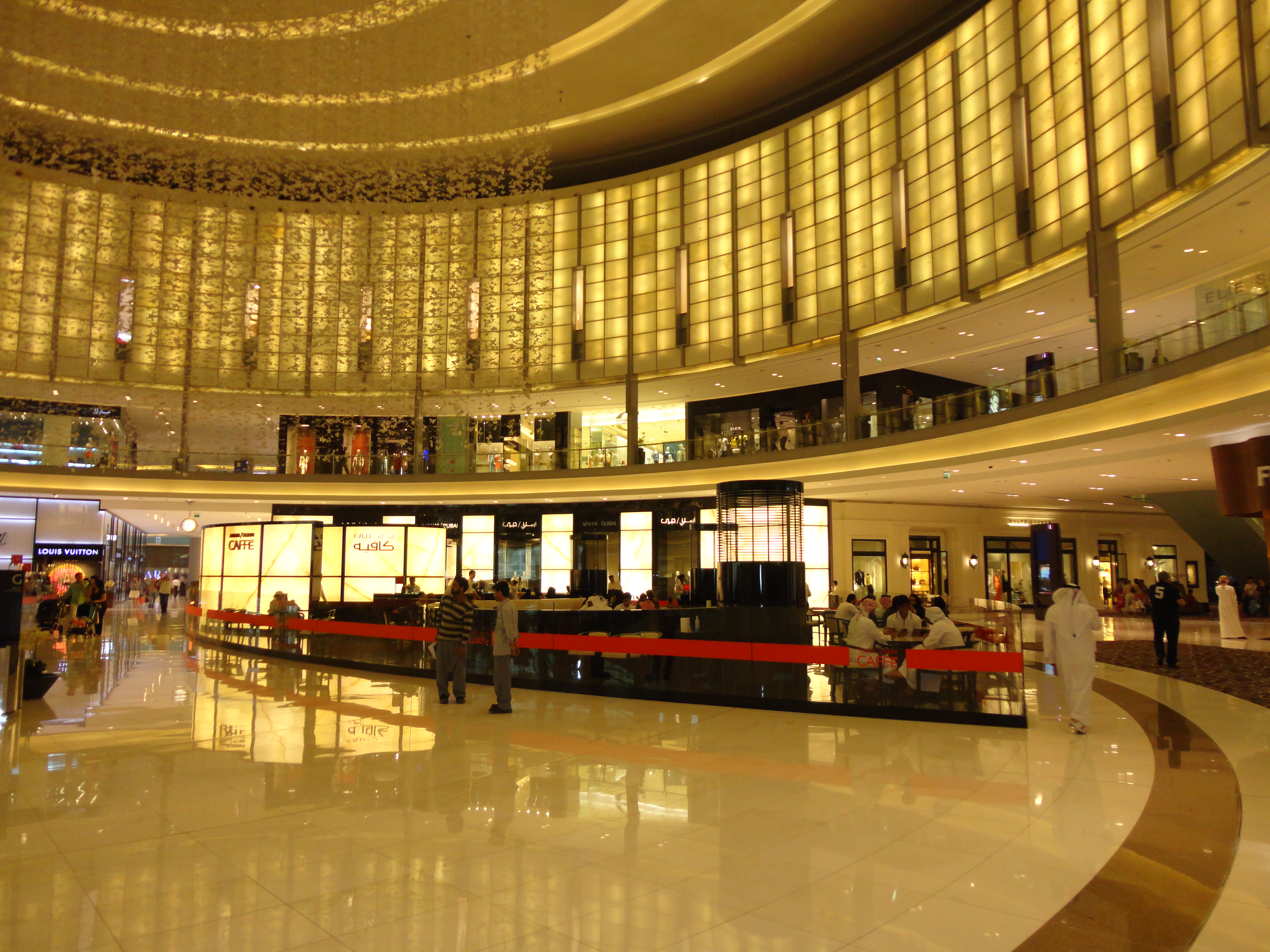
Dubai Mall Fashion Avenue

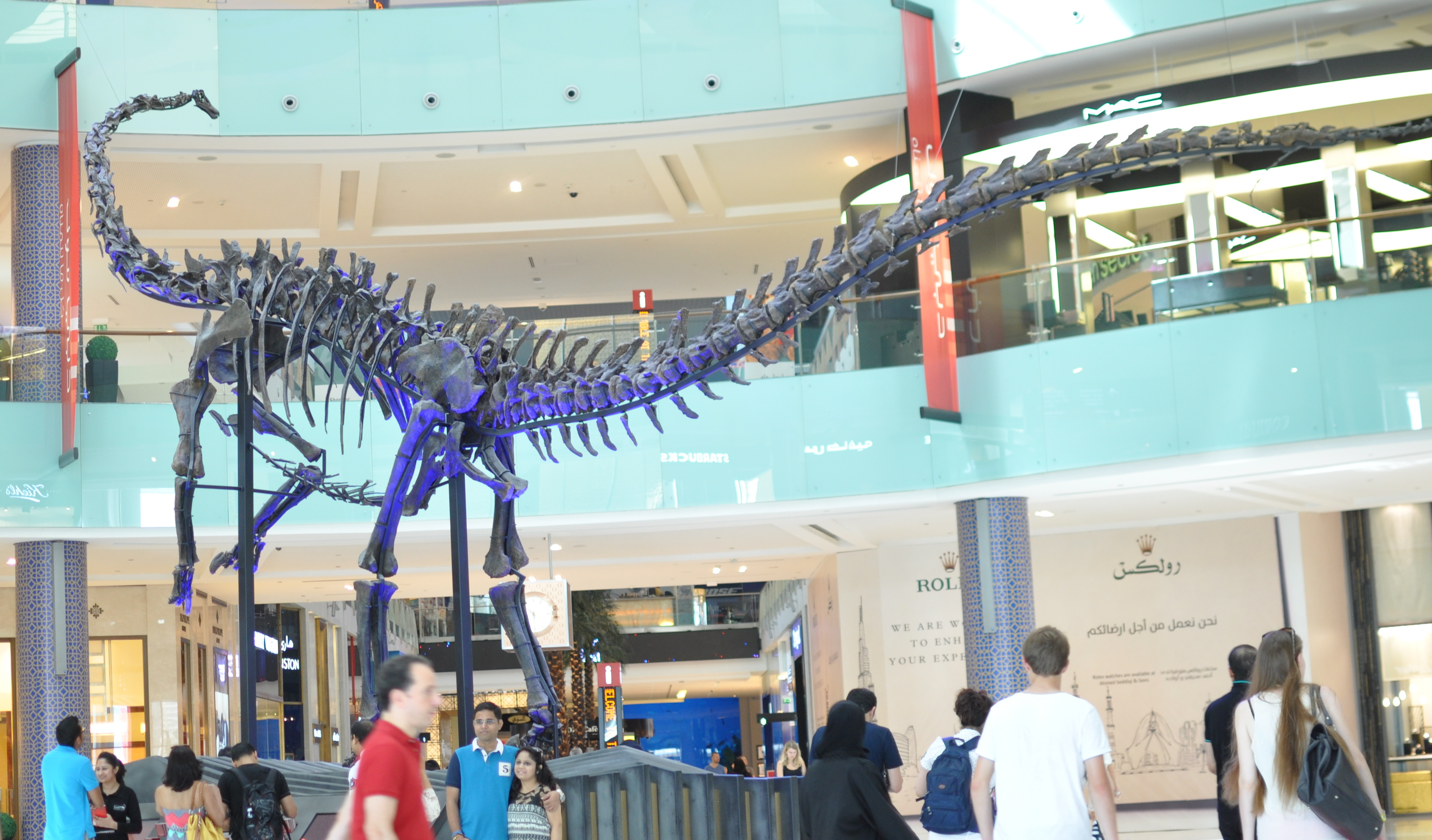
The Dubai Dinosaur

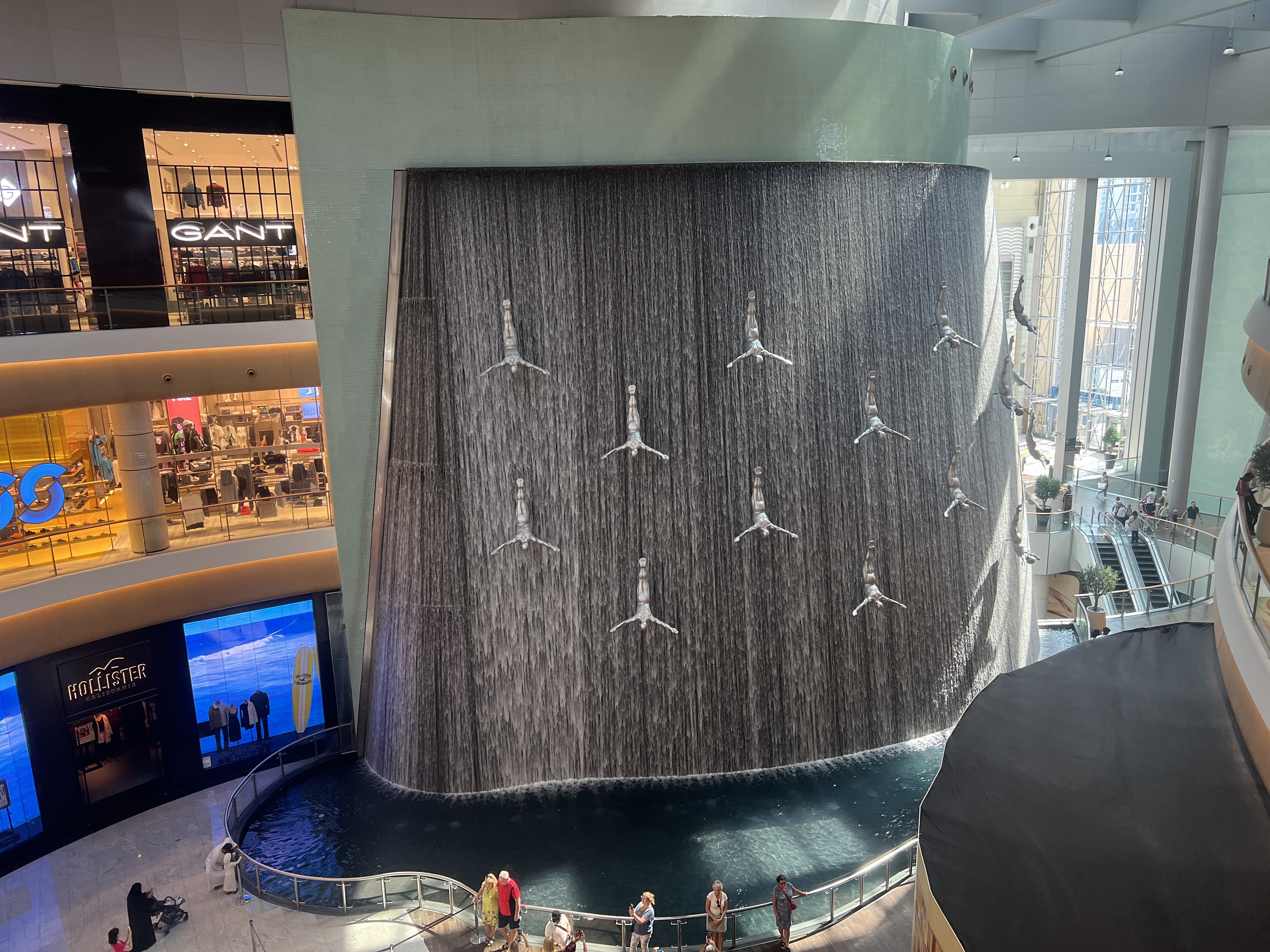
Indoor water fountain in the Dubai Mall

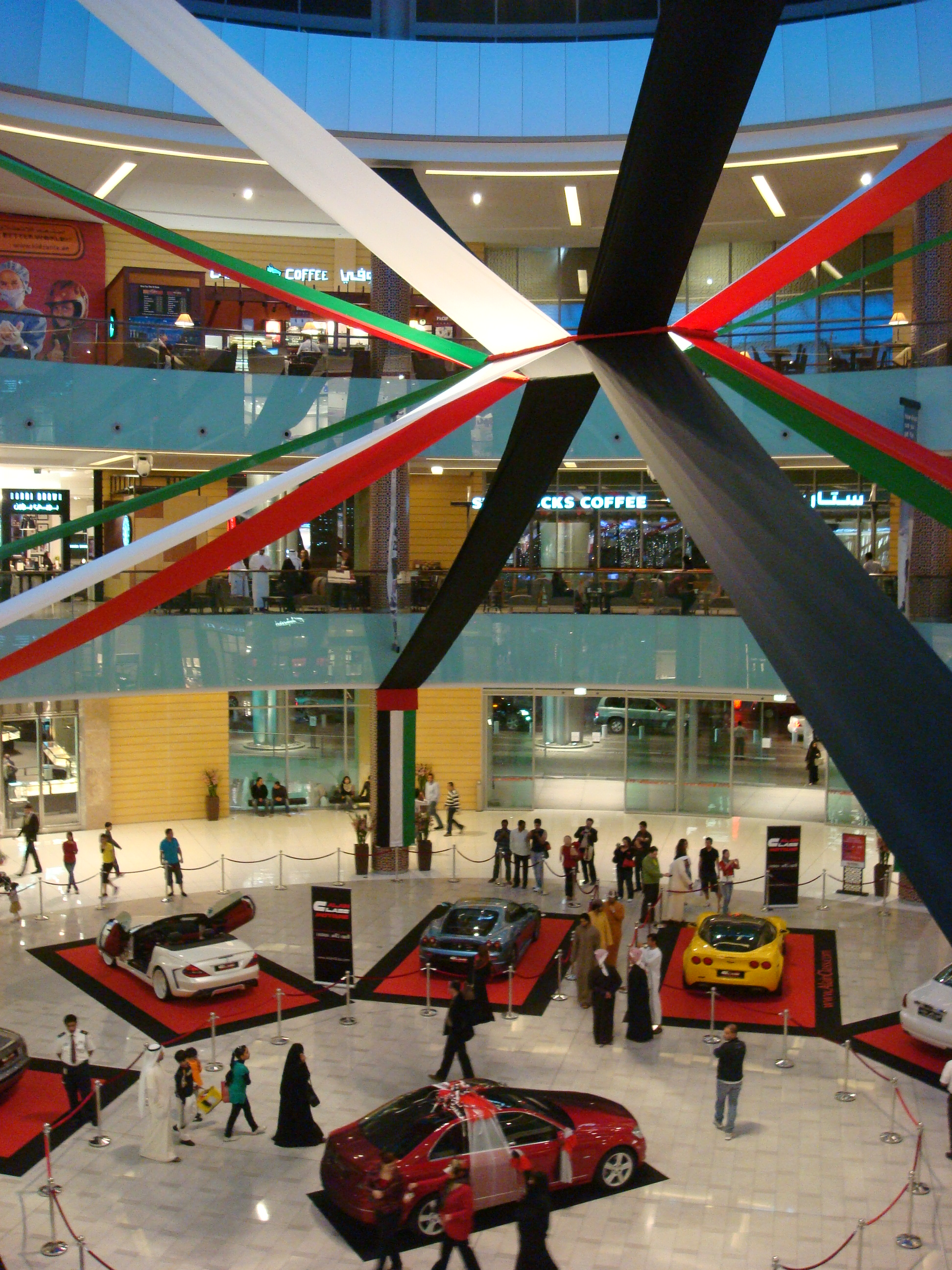
A view of one of the Dubai Mall's indoor atriums

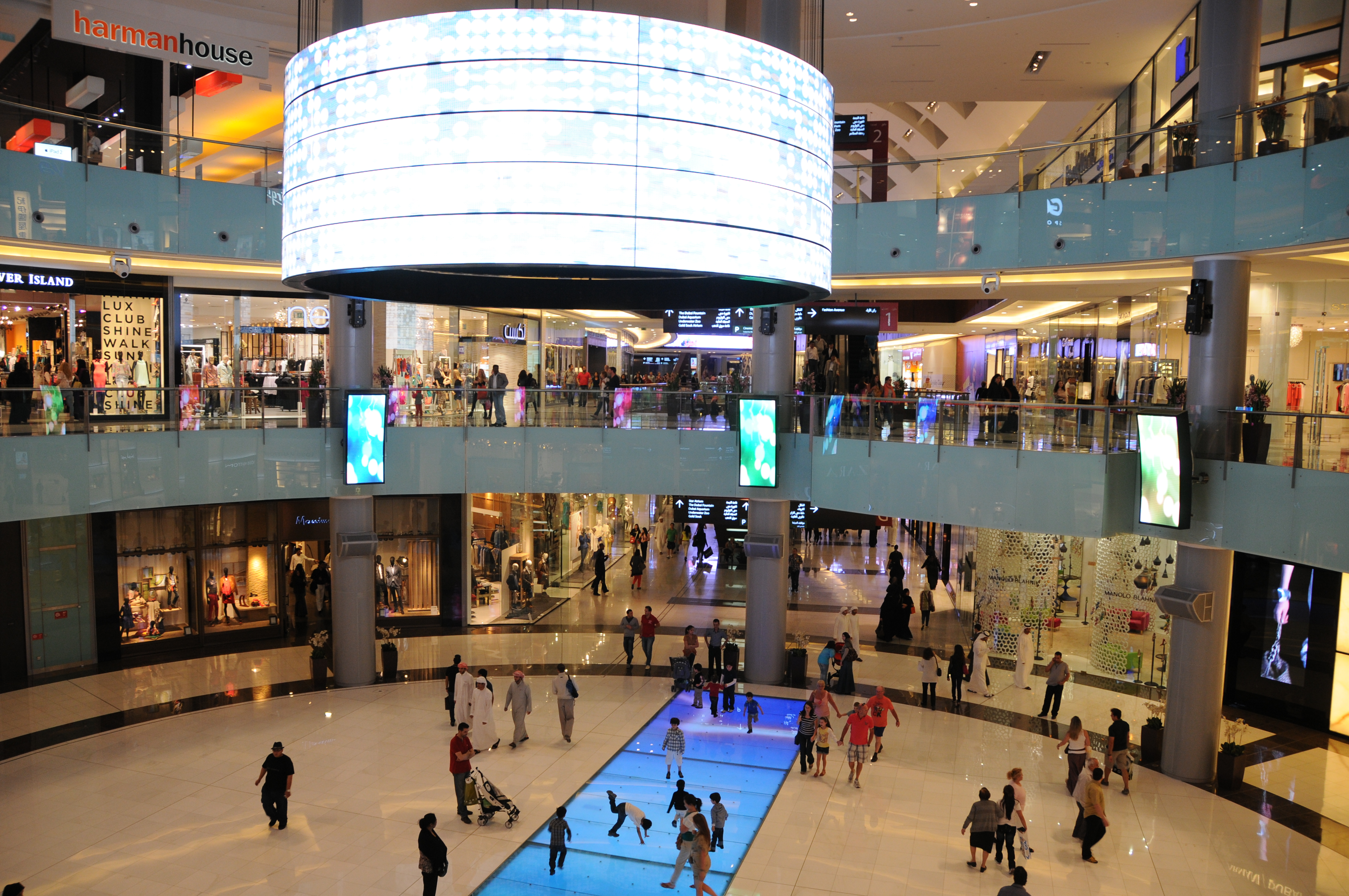
Another view of one of Dubai Mall's indoor atriums

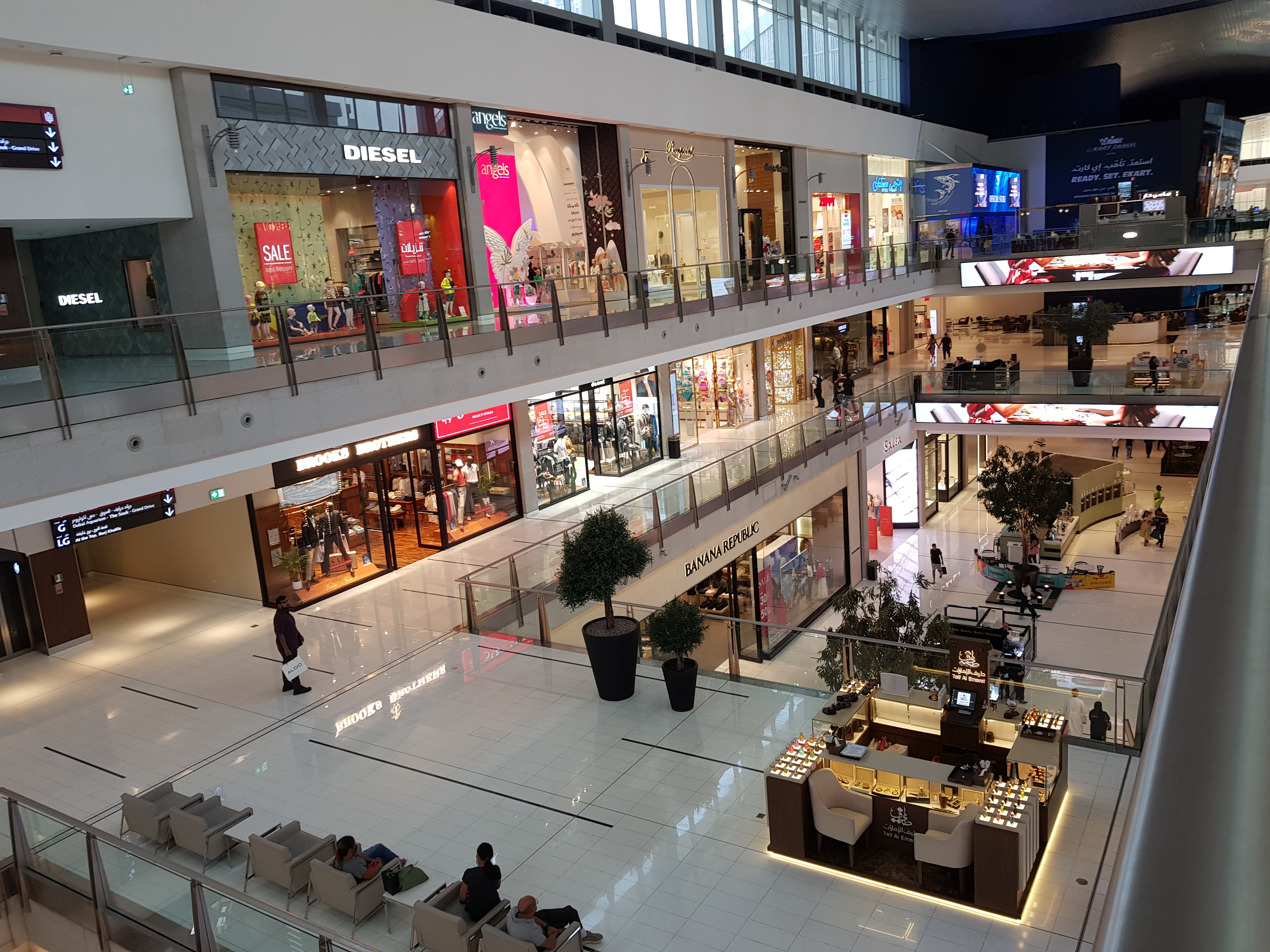
A view of the interior hallways of the mall

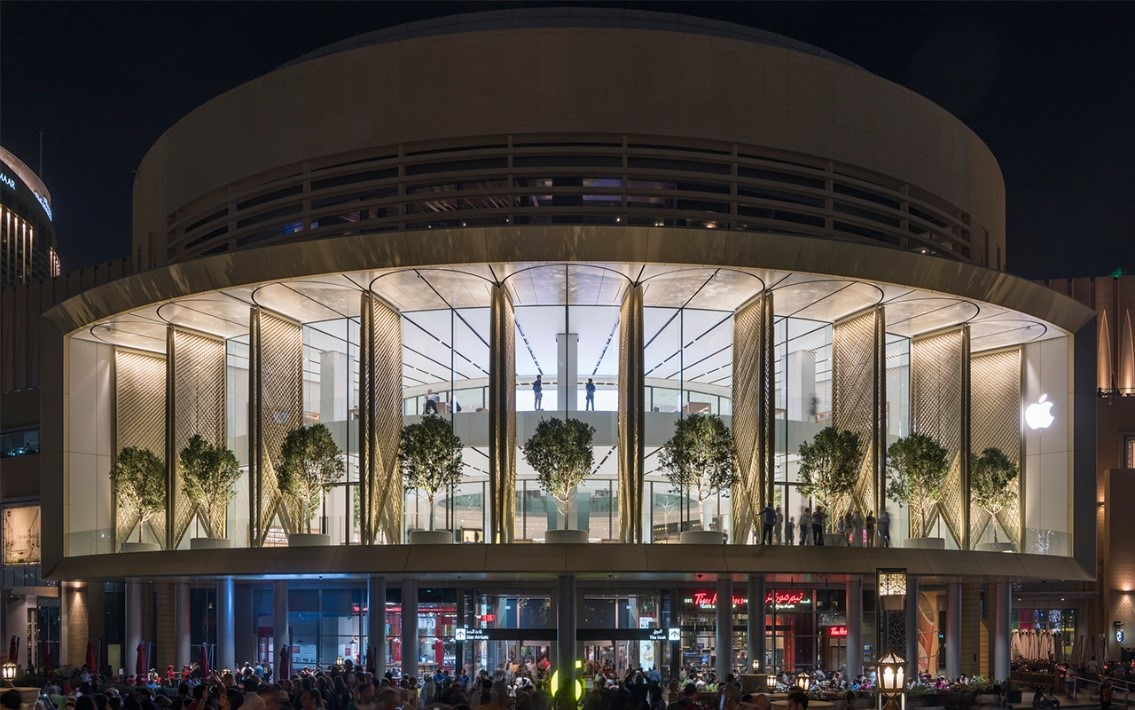
An exterior view of the mall, taken from The Dubai Fountain

== See also ==
- Dubai Fountain
- List of shopping malls in Dubai
- List of the world's largest shopping malls
- Mall of Arabia (Dubai)
- Mall of the Emirates
