= Zenus Bank =

American digital bank

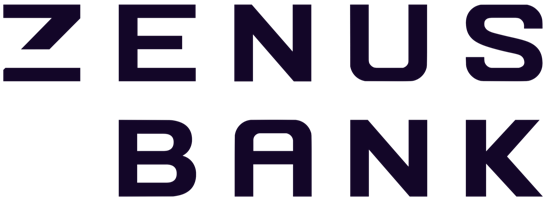
- Type: Private
- Industry: Financial services
- Founded: 2019
- Founder: Mushegh Tovmasyan
- Headquarters: San Juan, Puerto Rico
- Products: Personal accounts; corporate accounts; institutional accounts; payment rails; global card issuance; embedded banking; payment solutions
- Services: Business-to-Business payments; Peer-to-Peer payments
- Number of employees: 50
- Website: Zenus Bank

Zenus Bank is an American digital bank headquartered in San Juan. Founded in 2019 by Mushegh Tovmasyan, the company operates with an international banking licence offering Personal, Business, Corporate and Institutional banking services direct to clients through mobile apps and online banking. This approach enables clients to remotely open accounts without the need to be a US citizen, resident or registered business. It currently services customers in over 90 countries.

The bank is a Principal Member of Visa and offers customers current accounts, virtual and physical debit cards, free international payment transfers, domestic ACH and international wire transfers in over 40 currencies. A member of the Society for Worldwide Interbank Financial Telecommunications (SWIFT), Zenus Bank operates a full reserve banking model without lending or credit activities, offering an international alternative to local banks.

== History ==
Zenus was founded in Puerto Rico in 2019 by Mushegh Tovmasyan, formerly the founder and Group Chief Executive Officer of Divisa Capital and the online trader Equiti Group. He also founded the management consulting firm FXFY in Puerto Rico.

The Bank, which officially launched its services in October 2021, was established with the aim of allowing individuals and businesses in developing countries to apply for a US bank account and debit card remotely, without needing to be a US citizen or resident, to help provide day-to-day banking services globally.

In 2024, Zenus expanded its product offering with the launch of a suite of fintech products and commercial accounts, targeting global businesses by providing virtual accounts, debit card issuance, and global payment solutions. Zenus became the first financial institution to provide a fully embedded banking platform that enables financial institutions worldwide to issue dedicated USD accounts, process international payments, and offer cross-border Visa card issuance through a single API-driven solution.

== Fundraising ==
In 2019, Zenus closed an undisclosed pre-seed funding round from financers, including the investment firm, Three Thousand Capital.

== Issued Cards ==
Zenus was granted Principal Membership by Visa in 2020 - a first of its kind partnership allowing the instant issuance of digital cross border Visa cards to clients around the world. The Zenus Visa Infinite physical card was rolled out in October 2022.
