= Burj Khalifa/Dubai Mall (Dubai Metro) =

Train station in Dubai

Burj Khalifa/Dubai Mall برج خليفة / دبي مول

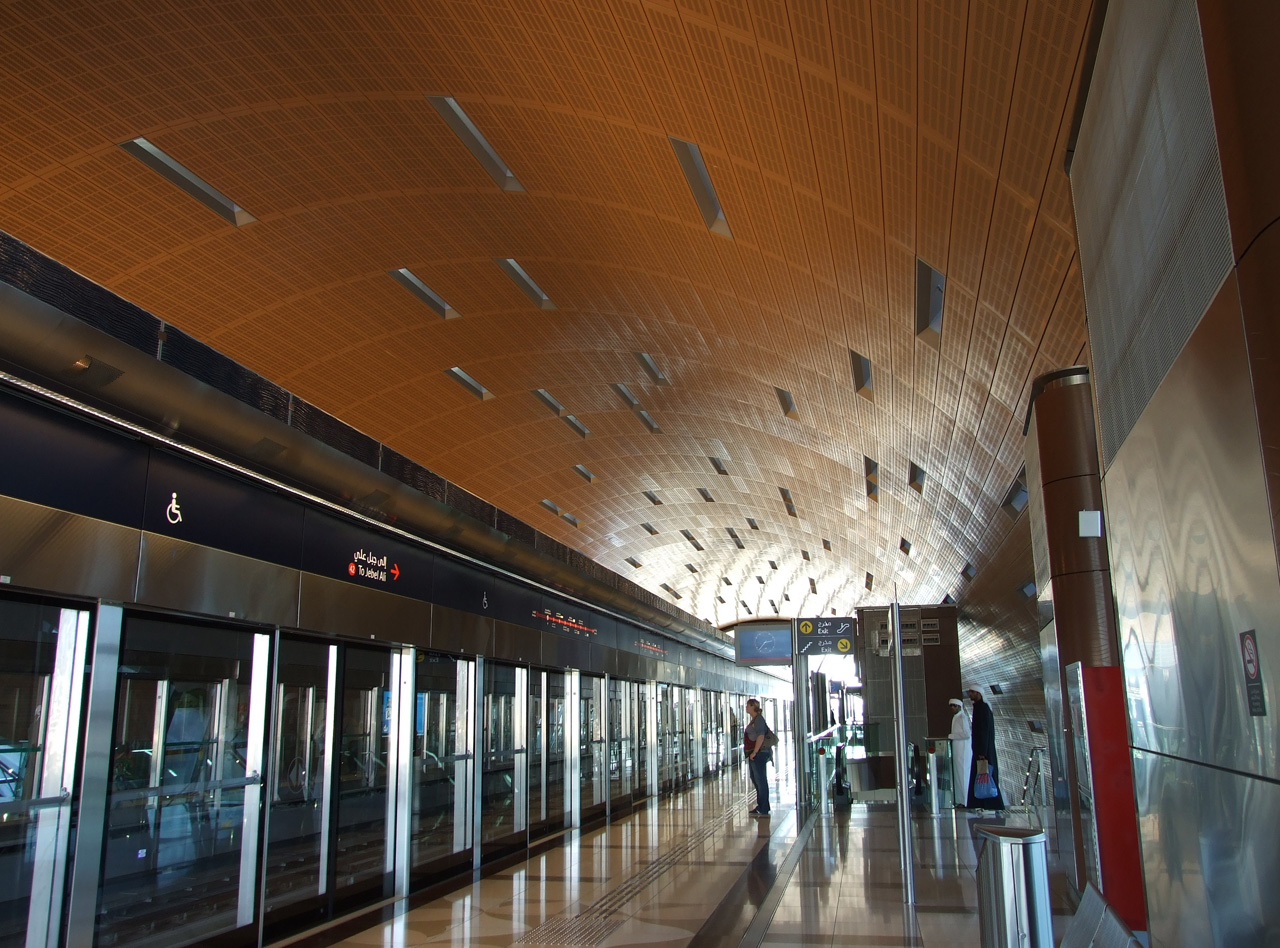
- Platform at the metro station

General information
- Location: Downtown Dubai, Dubai; United Arab Emirates
- Coordinates: 25°12′05″N 55°16′10″E
- Line: Red Line
- Platforms: 2 side platforms
- Tracks: 2
- Connections: RTA Dubai: 30 Dubai Mall MS - Dubai Sky Courts; D03 Dubai Mall MS - Dubai Design District; SH1 Dubai Mall Metro Station - Sobha Hartland; F13 Dubai Mall MS - The Dubai Mall; Ras Al Khaimah Transport Authority: DXB1 Al Hamra Bus Stn. - Dubai Mall

Construction
- Accessible: yes

Other information
- Station code: 25

History
- Opened: 4 January 2010; 17 April 2024
- Closed: 16 April 2024

Passengers
- 2011: 3.180 million ▲34.2%

Services
| Preceding station | Dubai Metro | Following station |
|---|---|---|
| Business Bay towards Expo 2020 or Life Pharmacy | Red Line | Financial Centre towards Centrepoint |
Location

Burj Khalifa/Dubai Mall (Arabic: برج خليفة / دبي مول; Arabic pronunciation: [burdʒ xaˈliːfa duˈbajː mawl]) is a rapid transit station on the Red Line of the Dubai Metro in Dubai. It is one of the busiest stations of the Dubai Metro, with over 3.180 million passengers in 2011.

== History ==
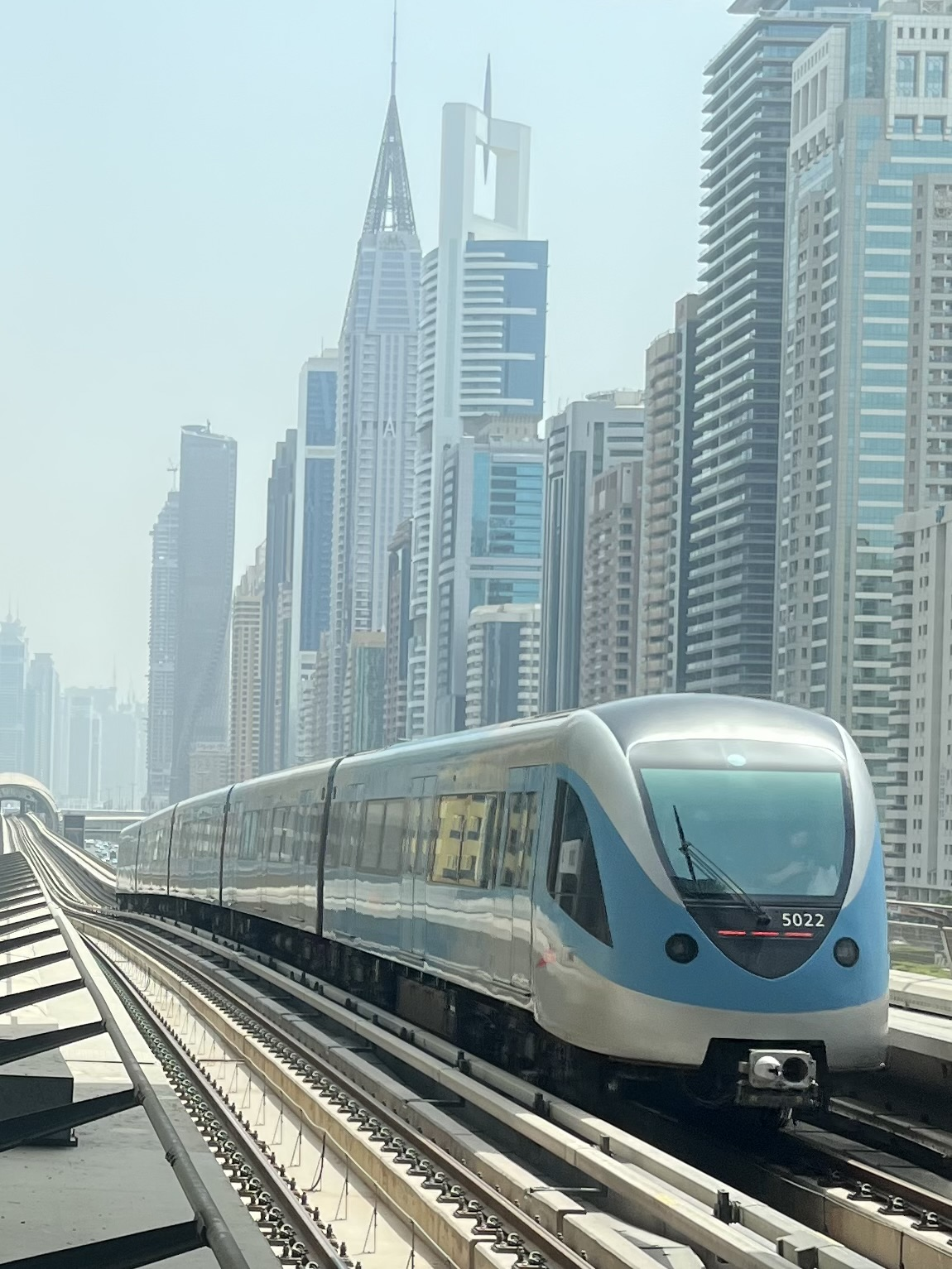
Train on the Red Line

The first station to open after the system's initial opening, Burj Khalifa/Dubai Mall saw service on 4 January 2010. The station’s opening coincided with the opening of Burj Khalifa. On 26 December 2012, a new walkway directly connecting the station to the Dubai Mall opened, eliminating the need for a bus trip to get to the mall.

On 16 April 2024, the station closed due to bad weather and reopened the next day, 17 April 2024.

Even with the opening of the walkway, the location of the station is not particularly convenient for visitors wishing to go up the Burj Khalifa, as the walk along the walkway and through the mall to the Burj Khalifa is over a mile.

In 2025, RTA announced a new expansion of the Burj Khalifa-Dubai Mall station that will expand the station’s area and its hourly capacity. The project will be completed by Dubai’s Roads and Transport Authority (RTA), in collaboration with Emaar Properties to accommodate growing passenger demand, particularly during the New Year's Eve celebrations. The project will also see enhancements to optimise passenger movement.

== Location ==
Burj Khalifa/Dubai Mall station is located on the southern side of the interchange between Sheikh Zayed Road, Financial Centre Road and Al Safa St. Directly to the east is the large Downtown Dubai development, containing the Burj Khalifa, the tallest building in the world, and the Dubai Mall, after which the station is named. It is the closest station to a number of major attractions, including The Dubai Fountain and the Address Downtown.

== Station layout ==
Like many stations on the Red Line, Burj Khalifa/Dubai Mall station lies on a viaduct paralleling the eastern side of Sheikh Zayed Road. It is categorised as a type 2 elevated station, indicating that it has two side platforms with two tracks and utilises an elevated concourse between street and platform level.

| G | Street level | Exit/Entrance |
| L1 | Concourse | Automatic Fare Collection gates, station agent, crossover |
| L2 | Side platform | Doors will open on the right |
| L2 | Platform 2 Southbound | Towards ← Life Pharmacy / Expo 2020; Next Station: Business Bay |
| L2 | Platform 1 Northbound | Towards → Centrepoint; Next Station: Financial Centre |
| L2 | Side platform | Doors will open on the right |
