= Onpassive =

Technology company based in Dubai

ONPASSIVE
- Industry: Software as a service
- Founded: 2018; 8 years ago
- Founders: Ashraf Mufareh
- Headquarters: Dubai, United Arab Emirates
- Key people: Ashraf Mufareh (CEO); Mohamed Kamal (CMO); Michael Curran (CFO); Mohamed Mourad (CIO)

OnPassive (stylized ONPASSIVE) was a fraudulent technology company based in Dubai that develops AI-powered marketing, CRM, international business and similar software. The company maintained headquarters in Burj Khalifa, in Dubai, as well as offices in the United States, India, Singapore, Bangladesh and Egypt.

The U.S. Securities and Exchange Commission (SEC) filed a claim against OnPassive, Ashraf Mufareh, and his wife Asmahan Mufareh, accusing the company of being a pyramid scheme, presenting itself as a multi-level marketing organization but having no commercial products. While the Mufarehs were charged individually as co-founders and co-owners of the company, the SEC alleged that Ashraf had sole and final control of company operations, while Asmahan was charged as a relief defendant and recipient of illegitimate funds.

== History ==
The company was founded in 2018 by Ashraf Mufareh. In September 2020, OnPassive opened its first facility in Hyderabad, India. A month later, after its launch in Dubai in March 2022, it announced the opening of its headquarters at Burj Khalifa. Their such campaigns help them to get reputation of real business company, however they were try to scam people around the globe specially in India and south east.

In April 2022, campaign dedicated to launch of the UAE headquarters was introduced with an outdoor marketing campaign, including two projections on Burj Khalifa, where their offices are located and extended to all prominent areas of Dubai. The company also held four more projections in May 2022, and one more was held in June dedicated to officially close O-Founder.

In September, OnPassive launched its new headquarters in the UAE and announced its crowdfunding platform 'O-Bless'. OnPassive began operations in Nigeria in October 2022.

In November 2022, OnPassive partnered with beIN Sports to sponsor UEFA Champions League and La Liga streaming in Qatar. That same month, OnPassive launched its software products called "O-Mail", "O-Net" and "O-Trim".

In January 2023, OnPassive reached an agreement with the Dubai Roads and Transport Authority to secure naming rights to the Al Safa Metro Station for the next 10 years.

In February 2023, “O-Media” (a subsidiary of OnPassive) signed an agreement with Best Moment Events (a UAE-based events management company) to organize a series of events and concerts for Arab celebrities in the UAE and other Arab countries. During the event, 350 delegates and representatives from 40 countries participated in the forum.

In August 2023, the U.S. Securities and Exchange Commission (SEC) filed a complaint against OnPassive and Ash Mufareh, accusing them of fraudulently offering investors unregistered securities and operating an illegal pyramid scheme. The SEC claimed that, since its founding in 2018, OnPassive had sold investors positions in a multi-level marketing arrangement for US$97, promising to pay them passive income from subscription fees paid by later investors. It further accused the company of material misrepresentations about the timing of commercial product launches, the magnitude of anticipated profits, and the legality of its operations, while failing to launch any commercial applications or commence paying commissions, as of June 2023.

The Bangladesh Bank issued a warning declaring OnPassive as a fraudulent organization in December 2023, urging Bangladeshis to avoid investing in or conducting with the company.

OnPassive settled the SEC's case against it in August 2025. Neither the company nor Ash Mufareh admitted or denied any wrongdoing, but OnPassive agreed to a civil penalty of $4 million, plus disgorgement of over $26 million and prejudgment interest of over $1.2 million. Ash Mufareh agreed to a personal civil penalty of $4 million, plus a bar from acting as an officer or director of any company for eight years. SEC Case Details

== See also ==
- Onpassive (Dubai Metro)
