= Johan Cruijff Boulevard =

Pedestrian promenade in Amsterdam-Zuidoost, Netherlands

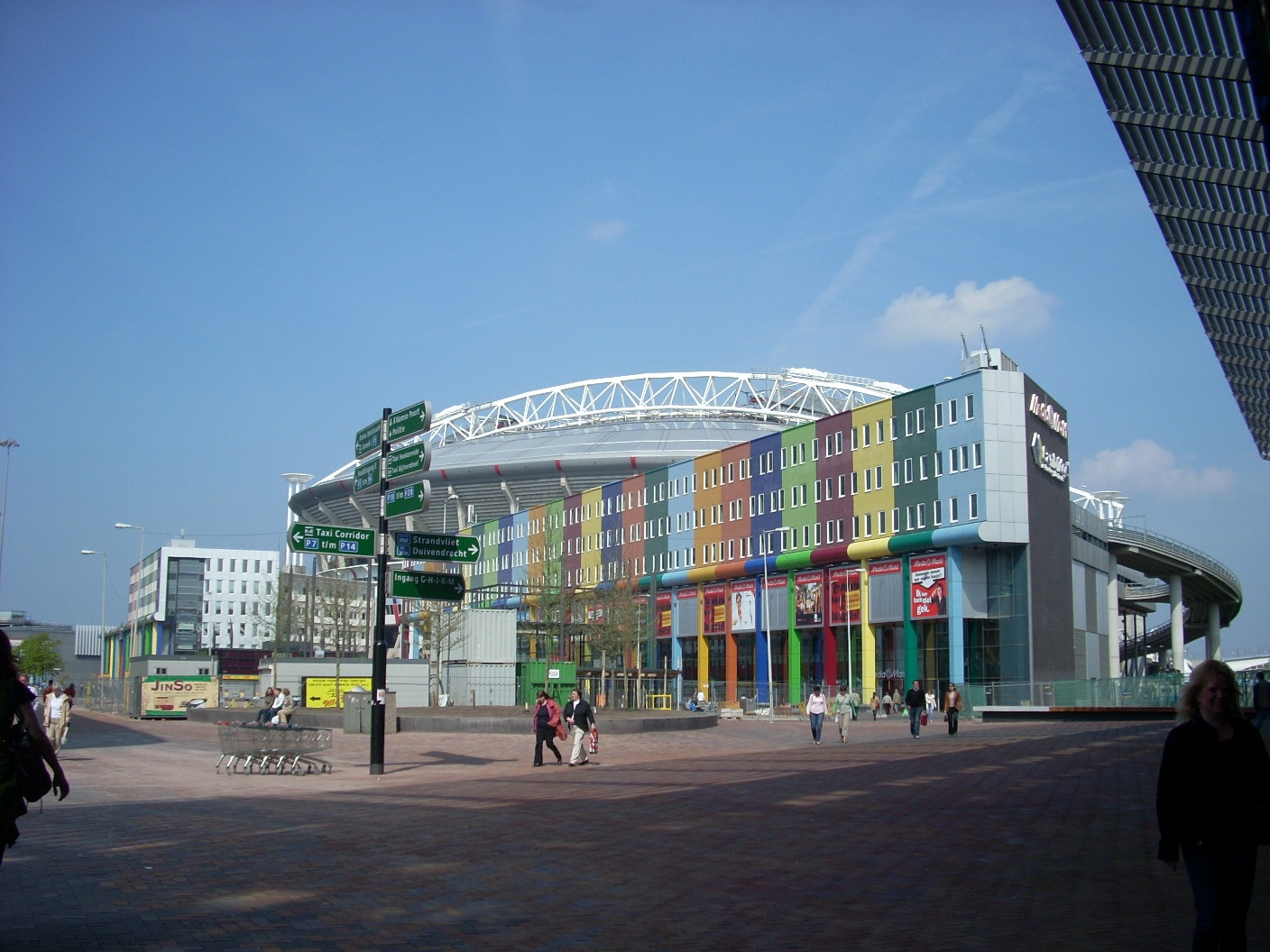
- The Johan Cruijff ArenA, at the western end of the boulevard
- Interactive map of Johan Cruijff Boulevard
- Former name: ArenA Boulevard (until 2020)
- Namesake: Johan Cruyff
- Type: Pedestrian promenade
- Location: Amsterdam-Zuidoost, Amsterdam, Netherlands
- Postal code: 1101
- From: De Passage
- To: Hoekenrodeplein

Other
- Known for: Johan Cruijff ArenA, Amsterdam Bijlmer ArenA station

The Johan Cruijff Boulevard (until 2020 the ArenA Boulevard) is a pedestrian promenade in the central area of Amsterdam-Zuidoost, Netherlands, named after the footballer Johan Cruyff.

== Name ==
On 1 July 2020 the promenade was renamed from ArenA Boulevard to Johan Cruijff Boulevard in honour of Johan Cruyff. The old name followed the naming theme, with a capital A at each end of "ArenA", shared by other attractions in the area.

== Location ==
The boulevard links the Ziggo Dome and the neighbouring Johan Cruijff ArenA with Amsterdam Bijlmer ArenA station, continuing to the Amsterdamse Poort shopping centre. Along the promenade are the Villa ArenA furniture mall, the AFAS Live concert hall, the Pathé ArenA multiplex cinema, and a number of office buildings, shops, bars and restaurants. Although it is called a boulevard, the space is more a long, wide square. It is mostly used by crowds waiting or gathering for large events at the entertainment venues.

== Public transport ==
The nearest railway stations are Amsterdam Bijlmer ArenA and Duivendrecht, both also served by the Amsterdam Metro, as is Strandvliet. The boulevard is also served by buses, including the R-net rapid bus network, which link Bijlmer ArenA station with other parts of Amsterdam-Zuidoost and the surrounding region.

== Facilities ==
The boulevard is characterised by large-scale shops and entertainment venues.

- Johan Cruijff ArenA
- Amsterdam Bijlmer ArenA station
- P6 Uitgaansdriehoek car park
- Rainbow Offices
- Venues:
  - AFAS Live
  - Pathé ArenA
  - Ziggo Dome
- Shops:
  - Decathlon
  - MediaMarkt
  - Villa ArenA furniture mall
  - Albert Heijn
- Food and drink:
  - Asian Kitchen
  - Boulevard Fourteen
  - Burger Bitch
  - FEBO
  - Grand Café 3&20
  - Grolsch Pub
  - Ichi-e
  - JinSo
  - Kurio's Döner

== History ==
The plan for a square or boulevard arose in the mid-1990s, during construction of the stadium, then called the Amsterdam ArenA. The surroundings of the stadium were still undeveloped. Until then the western side of the railway line had mainly offices, but the arrival of the stadium gave it a leisure function as well. East of Bijlmer station and the Hoekenrodeplein, the large Amsterdamse Poort shopping centre had stood since 1986.

A plan followed to expand leisure facilities on a large scale and to make the area more coherent. A large furniture mall was to be built west of the stadium, with a boulevard running past the stadium and under the station to the Hoekenrodeplein and the Amsterdamse Poort. This required raising both Bijlmer station and the Foppingadreef, the road between the Hoekenrodeplein and the shopping centre: the railway and the road already ran on raised embankments, but the underpasses were to be widened and made higher. In the same period a multiplex cinema, a concert hall (then the Heineken Music Hall) and several megastores were to be built along the boulevard. Since the plan was largely completed, the existing shopping centre, the megastores, the furniture mall, the new stadium, the cinema and the concert hall have formed a large leisure cluster around the station. Partly with the boulevard in mind, Bijlmer station was not only raised but completely rebuilt and enlarged.

The boulevard runs under the station at almost its full width, and the Hoekenrodeplein was redesigned to connect with it. The Ziggo Dome was developed and built later. The boulevard has never been completed.

Successive development plans were carried out only in part or stalled before construction. In 2007, for example, only half of the then ArenA Boulevard was redesigned, together with the public space of the Amsterdamse Poort and the complete rebuilding of Bijlmer ArenA station. To a design by the landscape architects Karres en Brands, the paving, mostly grey concrete slabs, was replaced by grey, red, yellow and orange bricks laid as a large abstract mosaic. The standard street lights on poles were replaced by light fittings suspended on cables from the buildings and a few masts, which light the open space evenly at night and evoke a starry sky. Long benches were built in across the space. The aim was to give the area more colour, liveliness, safety and comfort.

In front of the Johan Cruijff ArenA, the paving is still temporary, pending development of the adjacent plot. That plot, which takes up half the length of the boulevard and lies directly west of AFAS Live, has never had permanent buildings. For a time it held the Grace theatre, later the Pepsi Stage. Plans for the large-scale GETZ Entertainment Centre with a wide variety of leisure facilities, did not proceed.

After the Pepsi Stage was removed, the empty field was renamed ArenaPark and used as an event site. Besides temporary performances, it several times hosted the celebrations of AFC Ajax's league titles. ArenaPark is due to be developed as the Urban Interactive District, an area with another theatre, a pop venue, leisure facilities, housing, offices and a hotel.

== Gallery ==
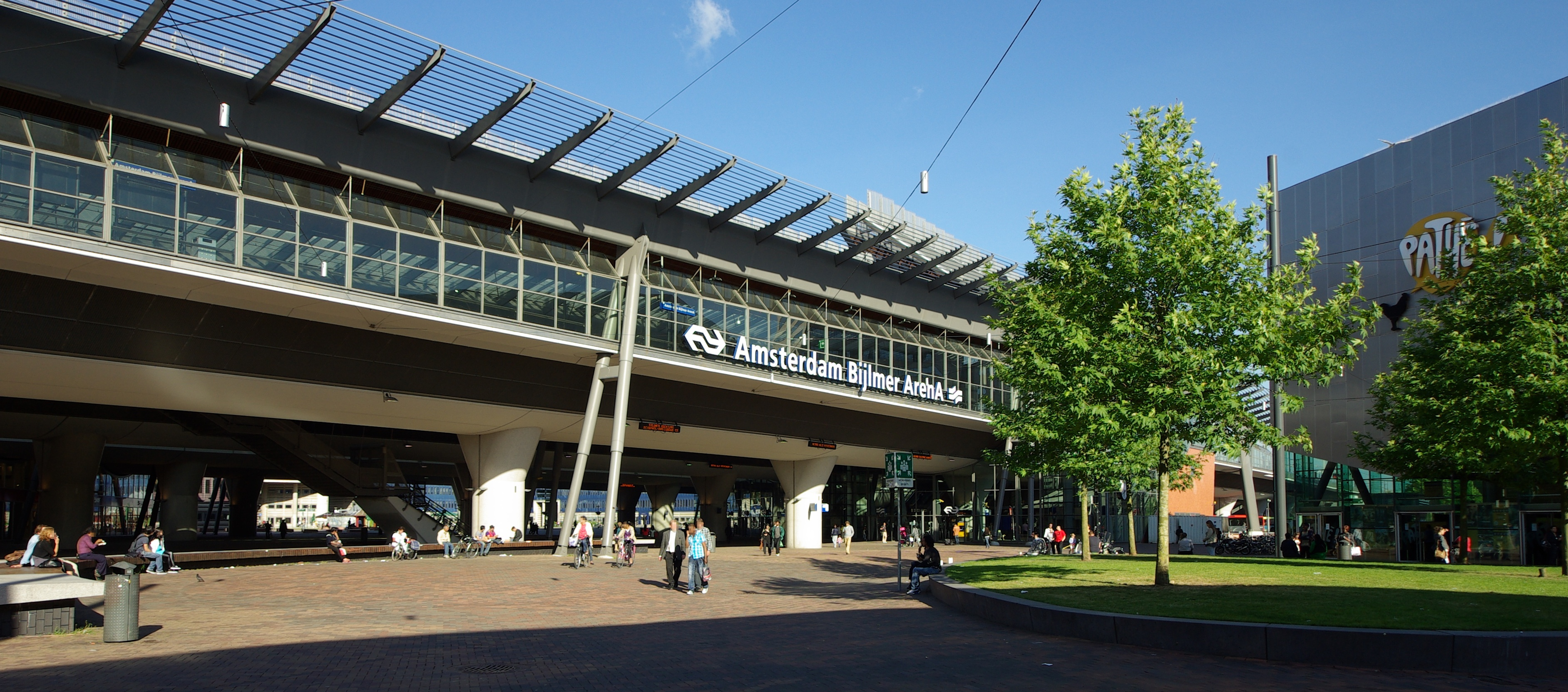
Bijlmer ArenA station and the Pathé ArenA

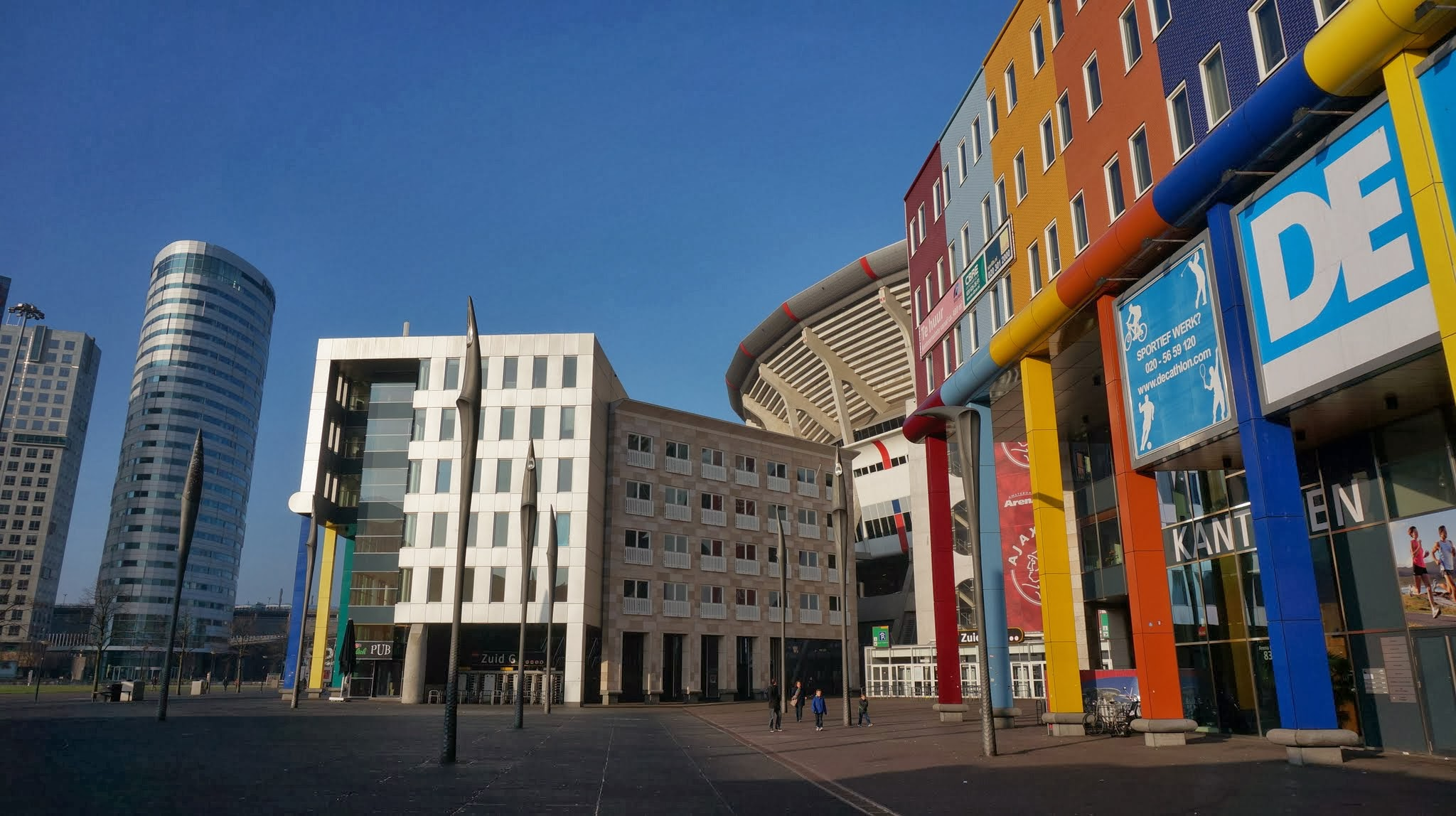
South entrance of the Johan Cruijff ArenA

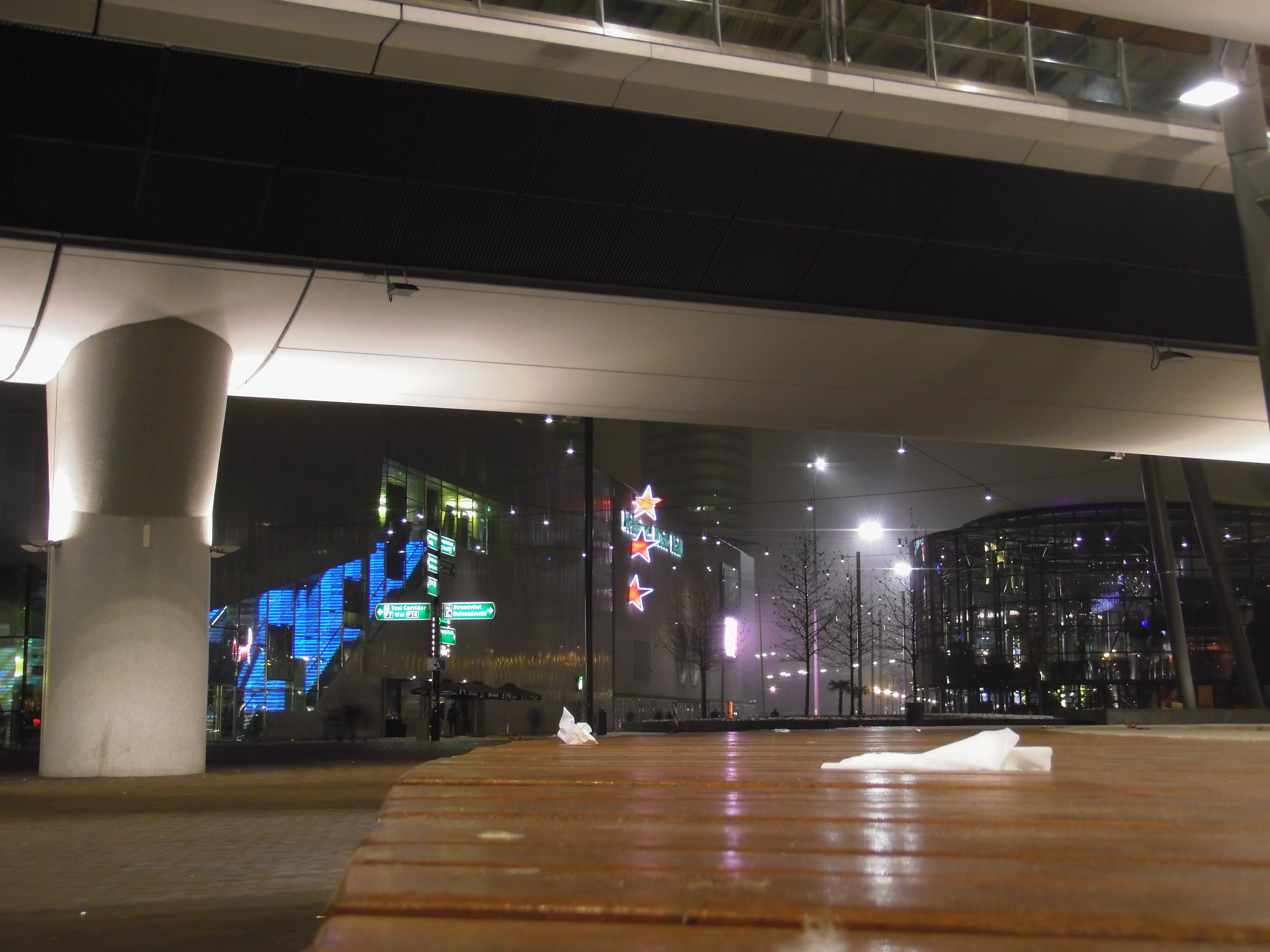
The boulevard at night

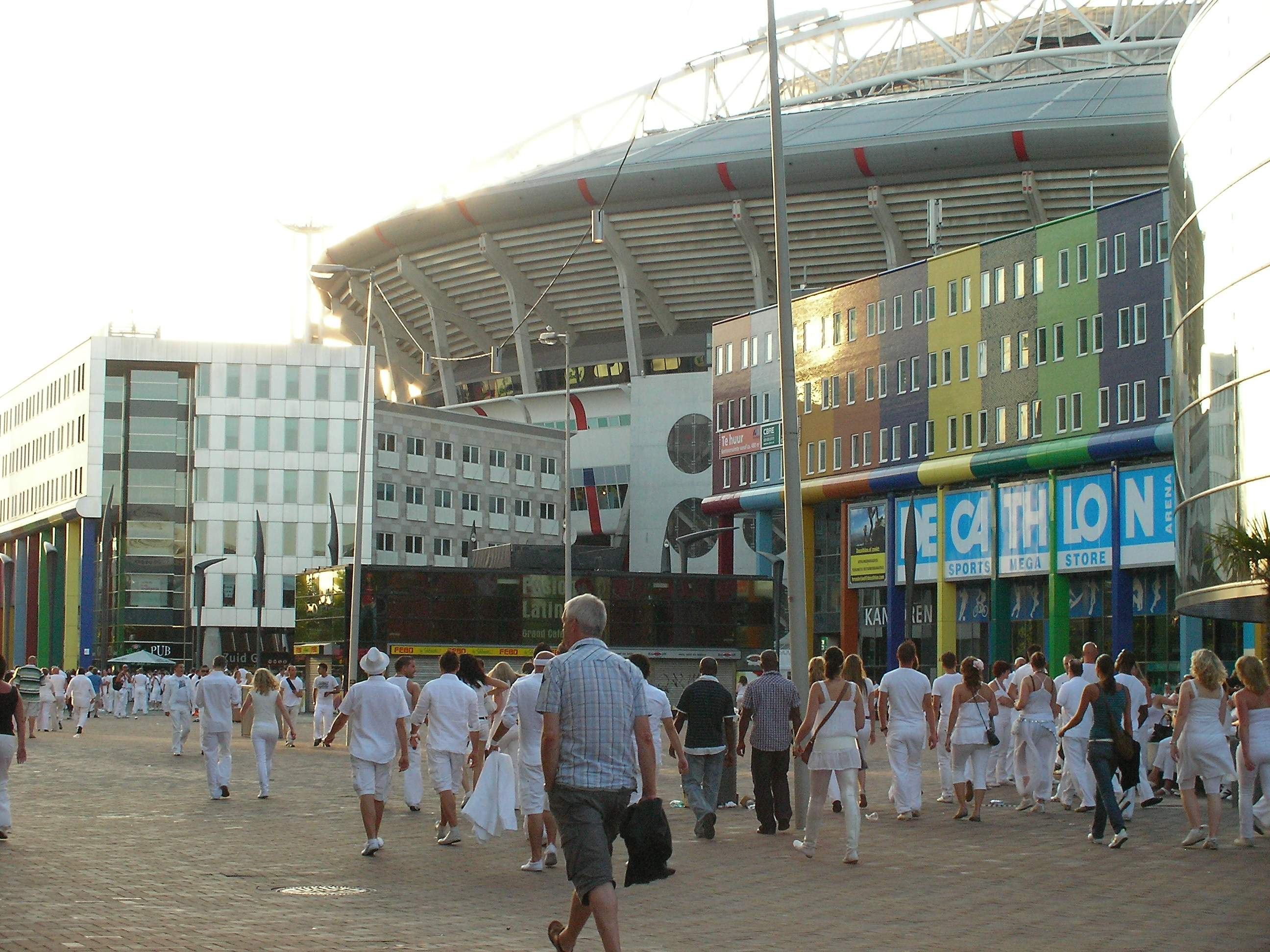
The square as a gathering place for event venues

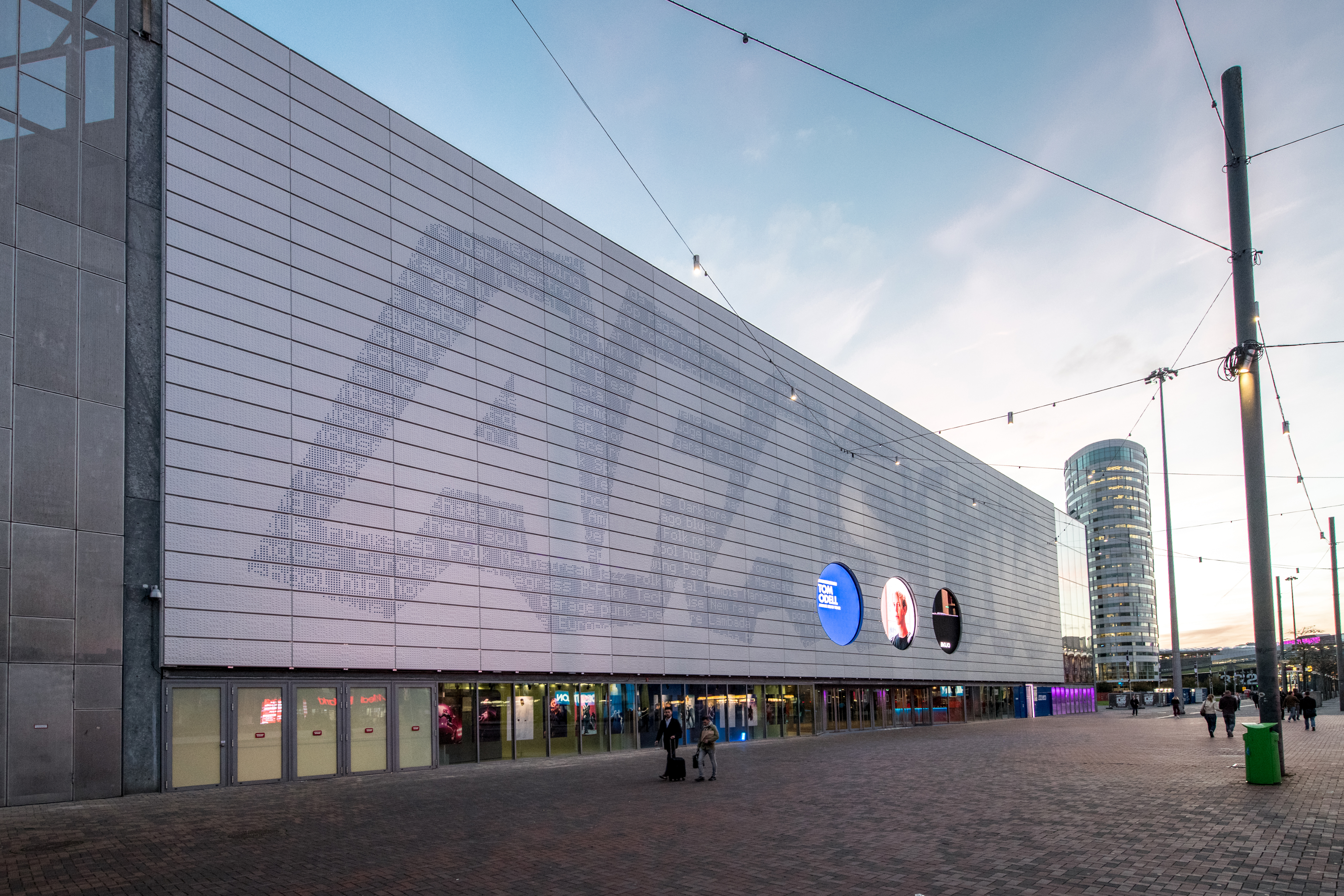
Glass front of AFAS Live

Glass facade of the JinSo restaurant, 2012
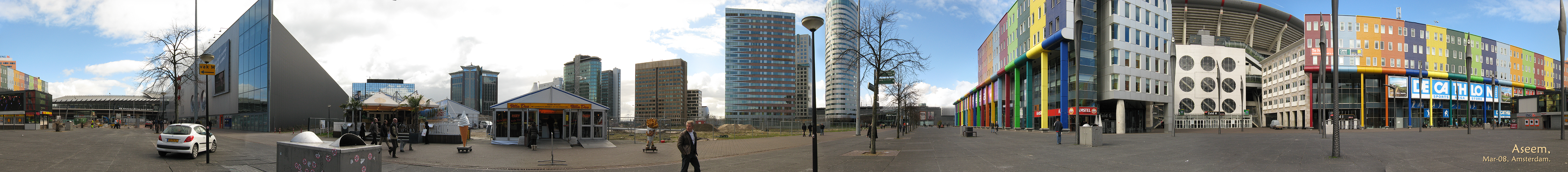
A 360-degree panorama of the boulevard before its redesign
