= Mall of the Emirates (Dubai Metro) =

Metro station in Dubai, UAE

Mall of the Emirates مول الإمارات

- View from outside the station

General information
- Location: Interchange 4, Sheikh Zayed Road; Al Barsha 1, Dubai; UAE
- Coordinates: 25.1212°N 55.2005°E
- System: Metro Station
- Owner: Roads and Transportation Authority
- Line: Red Line
- Platforms: 1 island platform
- Tracks: 2
- Connections: RTA Dubai: 81 The Dubai Mall - Mall Of Emirates Bus Stn; 93 Al Ghubaiba Bus Stn - Mall Of Emirates Bus Stn; 105 Mall Of Emirates Bus Stn - Miracle Garden; 106 Mall Of Emirates Bus Stn - Global Village; F30 Mall Of Emirates Bus Stn - Dubai Studio City; F32 Mall Of Emirates Bus Stn - The Sustainable City; F33 Mall Of Emirates Bus Stn - Al Barsha-3; F35 Mall Of Emirates Bus Stn - The Greens; F36 Mall Of Emirates Bus Stn - Arjan; F37 Mall Of Emirates Bus Stn - Sports City; J01 Mall Of Emirates Bus Stn - Jumeirah Village Circle

Construction
- Structure type: Elevated
- Parking: Available in Mall of the Emirates
- Accessible: yes

Other information
- Station code: 32
- Fare zone: 2

History
- Opened: September 9, 2009; April 18, 2024
- Closed: April 16, 2024

Passengers
- 2009: 929,716

Services
Preceding station	Dubai Metro	Following station
Insurance Market towards Expo 2020 or Life Pharmacy	Red Line	Equiti towards Centrepoint
Location

Mall of the Emirates metro station Arabic: مول الإمارات is a rapid transit station on the Red Line of the Dubai Metro in Dubai, UAE.

The station opened on 9 September 2009. It is connected directly to the nearby Mall of the Emirates by an enclosed overhead walkway.

The station closed on 16 April 2024 because of flood in the station.

This is one of the metro stations that hosted Dubai Metro Music Festival.

== Station Layout ==
G	Street level	Exit/Entrance
L1	Concourse	Automatic Fare Collection gates, station agent, crossover
L2	Side platform | Doors will open on the right
L2	Platform 2 Southbound	Towards ← Life Pharmacy / Expo 2020; Next Station: Insurance Market
L2	Platform 1 Northbound	Towards → Centrepoint; Next Station: Equiti
L2	Side platform | Doors will open on the right
