= Business Bay (Dubai Metro) =

Metro station in Dubai, United Arab Emirates

Business Bay الخليج التجاري
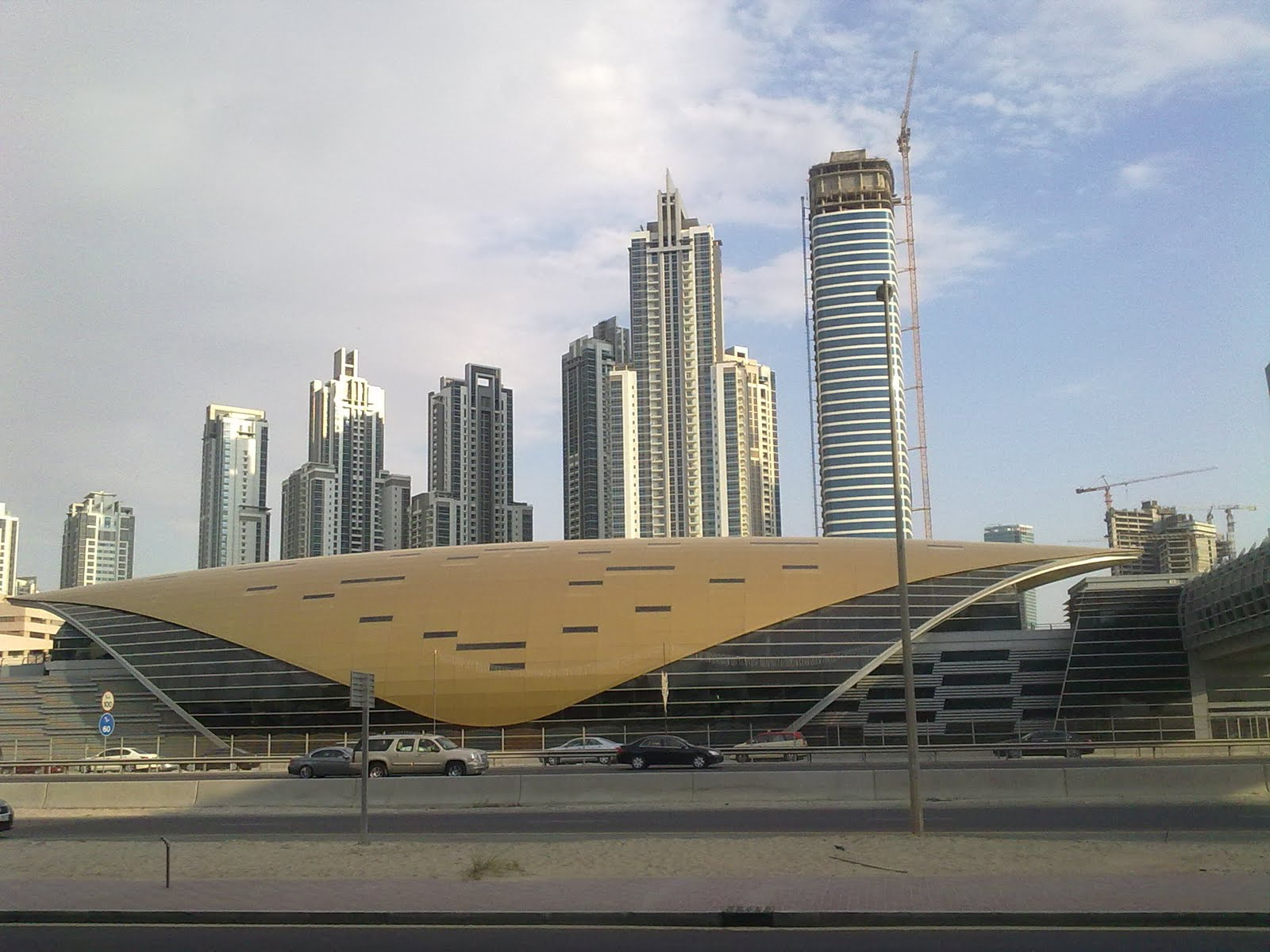
- View of the station

General information
- Location: Sheikh Zayed Road; Business Bay; United Arab Emirates
- Coordinates: 25.19127°N 55.26041°E
- System: Metro Station
- Line: Red Line
- Platforms: 2 side platforms
- Tracks: 2
- Connections: RTA Dubai: 7 Al Quoz, Bus Stn - Al Satwa; 9 Al Ghubaiba Bus Stn - Business Bay MS; 14 Oud Metha Bus Stn - Business Bay MS; 91 Al Ghubaiba Bus Stn - Jebel Ali Bus Stn; F14 Business Bay 2 Bus Stn - Business Bay MS; F19A Business Bay MS - Business Bay 2 Bus Stn; F19B Bay Square - Business Bay MS; F20 Business Bay MS - Al Safa 1; F41 Business Bay MS - Coral Tower; X22 Al Qusais Ind'l Area 2 - Business Bay MS

Construction
- Accessible: yes

Other information
- Station code: 26
- Fare zone: 6

History
- Opened: October 15, 2010

Services
Preceding station	Dubai Metro	Following station
Onpassive towards Expo 2020 or Life Pharmacy	Red Line	Burj Khalifa/Dubai Mall towards Centrepoint
Location

Business Bay (Arabic: الخليج التجاري, Arabic pronunciation: [alxaliːdʒ altidʒariː]) is a rapid transit station on the Red Line of the Dubai Metro in Dubai, UAE. It opened on 15 October 2010 along with four other intermediate stations on the Red Line.

== Location ==
Business Bay station is located at the intersection of Sheikh Zayed Road and 35th Street, southwest of Dubai's historic centre. As its name suggests, the station serves the large Business Bay, which borders Downtown Dubai. To the west of the station is the neighborhood of Al Wasl.

The station is in Zone 6 for pricing purposes.

The distance between Business Bay and Al Safa station (formerly known as Noor Bank Metro Station) stations is among the longest in the system; as a result, station codes 27 and 28 have been reserved for future use.

== Station layout and amenities ==
Like many stations on the Red Line, Business Bay lies on a viaduct paralleling the eastern side of Sheikh Zayed Road. It is categorized as a type 1 elevated station, indicating that the station's concourse is at ground level.

Pedestrian access is aided by a skybridge across Sheikh Zayed Road to Al Wasl. A crossover to the west of the station allows reversals from both Rashidiya and Jumeirah Lakes Towers. There are elevators, escalators, toilets, a convenience store, an information desk, ticket office, and self-service ticket vending machines. There is a taxi rank outside the station, which is important because Dubai is not a pedestrian-friendly city, and Al Habtoor City is at least 1 kilometer away.

G	Street level	Exit/Entrance
L1	Concourse	Automatic Fare Collection gates, station agent, crossover
L2	Side platform | Doors will open on the right
L2	Platform 2 Southbound	Towards ← Life Pharmacy / Expo 2020; Next Station: Onpassive
L2	Platform 1 Northbound	Towards → Centrepoint; Next Station: Burj Khalifa/Dubai Mall
L2	Side platform | Doors will open on the right
