= Equiti (Dubai Metro) =

Metro station in the United Arab Emirates

Equiti إكويتي

General information
- Location: Sheikh Zayed Road; Al Quoz; Dubai, United Arab Emirates
- Coordinates: 25°07′36.0″N 55°12′28.6″E
- System: Metro Station
- Operator: Dubai Metro
- Line: Red Line
- Platforms: 2
- Tracks: 2
- Connections: RTA Dubai: 12 Al Ghubaiba Bus Stn - Al Quoz Bus Stn; F25 Equiti MS - Al Qouz Ind'l Area 3 & 4; F26 Equiti MS - Onpassive MS; F29 Equiti MS - Al Wasl Road; DH1 Equiti MS - Dubai Hills

Construction
- Structure type: Elevated

Other information
- Station code: 31
- Fare zone: 2

History
- Opened: October 15, 2010; May 19, 2024
- Closed: April 16, 2024
- Former names: First Gulf Bank, First Abu Dhabi Bank, Umm Al Sheif

Services
Preceding station	Dubai Metro	Following station
Mall of the Emirates towards Expo 2020 or Life Pharmacy	Red Line	Onpassive towards Centrepoint
Location

Equiti (Arabic: إكويتي; formerly First Gulf Bank, First Abu Dhabi Bank and Umm Al Sheif) is a rapid transit station on the Red Line of the Dubai Metro in Dubai, UAE, serving Al Quoz and surrounding areas. The station is named after the Equiti Group.

Equiti station is located on the Sheikh Zayed Road near the major junction with Umm Suqeim Street. Nearby is the Gold and Diamond Park, immediately adjacent to the station, including the Old Library building. As well as Al Quoz, surrounding neighbourhoods include the eponymous Umm Al Sheif itself and Umm Suqeim. The station is close to a number of bus routes.

== History ==
The station opened as part of the Red Line on 15 October 2010 as First Gulf Bank. It was renamed to First Abu Dhabi Bank on September 21, 2017, Umm Al Sheif on November 24, 2020, and Equiti on 18 April 2022.

The station closed due to station flooding on 16 April 2024. Services resumed in May.

== Station Layout ==
G	Street level	Exit/Entrance
L1	Concourse	Automatic Fare Collection gates, station agent, crossover
L2	Side platform | Doors will open on the right
L2	Platform 2 Southbound	Towards ← Life Pharmacy / Expo 2020; Next Station: Mall of the Emirates
L2	Platform 1 Northbound	Towards → Centrepoint; Next Station: Onpassive
L2	Side platform | Doors will open on the right

== See also ==
- First Gulf Bank
- First Abu Dhabi Bank
- Umm Al Sheif
