= Garmin (Dubai Metro) =

Rapid transit station in Dubai, UAE

GARMIN غارمن

General information
- Location: Sheikh Zayed Road; Al Quoz Industrial First; Dubai, United Arab Emirates
- Coordinates: 25.155674°N 55.228535°E
- System: Metro Station
- Operator: Dubai Metro
- Line: Red Line
- Platforms: 2
- Tracks: 2
- Connections: RTA Dubai: 110 Al Serkal Avenue - Onpassive MS; F20 Business Bay MS - Al Safa 1; F26 Equiti MS - Onpassive MS

Other information
- Station code: 29
- Fare zone: 2

History
- Opened: May 15, 2010; May 19, 2024
- Closed: April 16, 2024 (Temporarily closed due to flooding)
- Former names: Al Safa, Noor Bank, Onpassive, Garmin

Services
Preceding station	Dubai Metro	Following station
Equiti towards Expo 2020 or Life Pharmacy	Red Line	Business Bay towards Centrepoint
Location

Garmin (Arabic: غارمن) is a rapid transit station on the Red Line of the Dubai Metro in Dubai, UAE, serving Al Quoz and surrounding areas. The station is located on the Sheikh Zayed Road near the major junction with Al Manara Street. Nearby are Al Quoz Bus Station, Kite Beach, Oasis Mall, and the Times Square Centre. As well as Al Quoz, surrounding neighbourhoods include the eponymous Al Safa itself and Umm Suqeim. The station is close to a number of bus routes.

The station has a history of naming rights arrangements; it opened as "Noor Bank" Station on 15 May 2010, and was renamed Al Safa on November 24, 2020, then Onpassive on January 11, 2023, after a Dubai-based technology company entered an agreement with the Dubai Roads and Transport Authority to purchase ten-year naming rights.

In August 2023, the U.S. Securities and Exchange Commission filed a complaint against the Onpassive company, accusing it of fraudulently offering investors unregistered securities and operating an illegal pyramid scheme. The accusations remain unsettled as of October 2024, so no action has been announced or taken on the naming of the station.

On 16 April 2024, the station closed due to flooding caused by heavy rain and reopened later.

On 7 September 2026, the naming rights were officially transferred to Garmin under a new ten-year agreement, renaming the stop to Garmin Metro Station and succeeding the previous Onpassive branding.

== Station Layout ==
G	Street level	Exit/Entrance
L1	Concourse	Automatic Fare Collection gates, station agent, crossover
L2	Side platform | Doors will open on the right
L2	Platform 2 Southbound	Towards ← Life Pharmacy / Expo 2020; Next Station: Equiti
L2	Platform 1 Northbound	Towards → Centrepoint; Next Station: Business Bay
L2	Side platform | Doors will open on the right
