= Elvira Sweet =

Dutch politician (born 1957)

Member of the Provincial executive of North Holland
- In office 2011–2015

Chair of the Amsterdam-Zuidoost borough executive
- In office 2002–2010
- Preceded by: Hannah Belliot
- Succeeded by: Marcel La Rose

Member of the Amsterdam Municipal Council
- In office 1998–2002

Personal details
- Born: 12 December 1957 (age 68) Amsterdam, Netherlands
- Party: Labour Party
- Education: Vrije Universiteit Amsterdam

Elvira Sweet (born 12 December 1957) is a Dutch politician and administrator of Surinamese descent. A member of the Labour Party (PvdA), she sat on the Amsterdam municipal council (gemeenteraad) from 1998 to 2002, was chair (stadsdeelvoorzitter) of the borough of Amsterdam-Zuidoost from 2002 to 2010, and was a member of the provincial executive (gedeputeerde) of North Holland from 2011 to 2015, with responsibility for culture, governance and care.

== Early career ==
Before entering politics, Sweet worked in education, youth and social work, and home care. She taught in Paramaribo and later studied pedagogy at the Vrije Universiteit Amsterdam. She then spent eight years as head of youth work at the welfare organisation BZO in Amsterdam-Zuidoost, before becoming a manager at Amsterdam Thuiszorg, a home-care organisation, in Amsterdam-Noord.

== Amsterdam municipal council ==
Sweet was elected to the Amsterdam municipal council in 1998. She sat on the council committees for culture, for telecommunications and local media, and for education.

== Chair of Amsterdam-Zuidoost ==
=== First term ===
In 2002 Sweet became chair (stadsdeelvoorzitter) of the executive of the borough (stadsdeel) of Amsterdam-Zuidoost, succeeding Hannah Belliot, who had become an alderman of the city. Her portfolio covered the coordination of social and economic renewal, economic affairs, labour-market policy, general affairs, public safety and communications. In 2008 she described the borough as "a popular employer in the neighbourhood", noting that many of its staff lived in Zuidoost.

In 2004 the sale of a church building in Zuidoost, later known as the Lighthouse Chapel, to a Pentecostal congregation with a mostly white membership caused unrest. Twelve African churches that had rented the building had to leave, and accused the municipality of double standards. According to the scholar of religion Marten van der Meulen, Sweet used her position to ease the tension and arranged an alternative location for the church of the pastor Emmanuel Koney. Van der Meulen describes her as a Black Surinamese woman who had come to power partly as a result of the earlier "Black–White conflict" over the renewal of the Bijlmermeer.

=== Second term ===
The PvdA won an absolute majority in the 2006 borough elections in Zuidoost, and Sweet was reappointed. In a 2009 interview with Het Parool she said she saw the victory partly as a reward for working weeks of almost eighty hours.

In March 2008 the local broadcaster AT5 reported that Sweet had known since 2004 that the PvdA borough councillor Ernest Owusu-Sekyere was running an unlicensed bar from a wholesale business on the Bullewijkpad. She had confronted him about it in 2004 but had not told her party colleagues, and he was sixth on the PvdA list in 2006.

In the same 2009 Parool interview she called alderman Jude Kehla's criticism of subsidies to eight ethnic organisations in Zuidoost clumsy, and argued that more money was distributed along ethnic lines in the Amsterdam-West borough. She said negative publicity did not discourage her, describing herself as a tiger in that respect.

=== Gun violence in 2009 ===
In the summer of 2009 Zuidoost saw a series of shootings, with thirteen incidents in a few months. Sweet cut short her holiday in August, called the situation "unacceptable and intolerable" and announced additional measures. After the fatal shooting of 19-year-old Ishmael Gumbs in the K-buurt neighbourhood, an angry resident confronted her in front of AT5's cameras on 22 September 2009, saying she was not doing enough for the area's safety. He apologised to her five days later during a silent march. On 28 September she met Mayor Job Cohen, the police and prosecutors; the measures that followed included area bans for drug dealers, more preventive searches and neighbourhood safety teams. On 2 October she appeared on the talk show Pauw & Witteman to discuss the violence in the Bijlmer.

In December 2009 a post on Sweet's Twitter account recommended an unlicensed taxi, although earlier that year she had spoken out against such drivers. She deleted the post and said a neighbour had sent it from her BlackBerry.

=== Departure ===
Sweet stepped down as borough chair in 2010. Her farewell party was held on 25 March 2010, after eight years in office. AT5, which had not been invited, called her the "queen of the Bijlmer" and pointed to her often tense relationship with the press. HP/De Tijd reported that year that residents at a public meeting had loudly protested when she said Zuidoost was "the cleanest borough in Amsterdam" and that "we have come a long way". She handed over the chairmanship to Marcel La Rose on 25 May 2010.

== Provincial executive of North Holland ==
Sweet was elected to the States-Provincial (Provinciale Staten) of North Holland in the 2011 Dutch provincial elections. In the new coalition of the VVD, PvdA, D66 and CDA she became one of two PvdA members of the provincial executive (Gedeputeerde Staten), alongside Tjeerd Talsma, with responsibility for culture, governance and care. Her nomination came at the expense of the sitting PvdA executive member Sascha Baggerman, who told AT5 that "it had to be Elvira Sweet" and suspected pressure from the Amsterdam branch of the party, with the aim of making the provincial executive more diverse.

As a member of the executive, Sweet had to carry out the cut to the regional broadcaster RTV Noord-Holland agreed in the coalition agreement. Its director, Robert Zaal, argued that the cut should be phased in; Sweet replied that she was implementing the coalition agreement. Her portfolio also included cultural heritage. In June 2014 she opened a new annex of the Kooger Kerk in Zuid-Scharwoude and launched the restoration of its English Pilcher organ, to which the province contributed. In February 2015, at Marquette Castle, she presented the first copy of the book De Amsterdamse Buitenplaatsen (The Amsterdam Country Estates). Alongside her office she was an unpaid special registrar (buitengewoon ambtenaar van de burgerlijke stand), authorised to conduct civil weddings.

On 24 October 2012 Sweet gave the anniversary edition of the annual Anton de Kom Lecture (Anton de Kom-lezing), named after the Surinamese writer and resistance fighter Anton de Kom, at the Dutch Resistance Museum (Verzetsmuseum) in Amsterdam, organised by the museum and the anti-discrimination centre Art.1. She called De Kom her "great, personal hero" and linked his trade-union past and his call for solidarity to the position of workers in today's labour market. The comedian Jörgen Raymann led the discussion with the audience afterwards.

Sweet did not return to the provincial executive after the 2015 Dutch provincial elections.

== Later career ==
In 2016 Sweet sat on the nominating committee that proposed a new board for the PvdA's Amsterdam-Zuidoost branch. In 2017 she was appointed to the supervisory board (raad van toezicht) of ProDemos, the Dutch centre for democracy and the rule of law. She works as an adviser and coach in public administration, care, education and culture, and as a mediator.
