= Equiti Group =

- Type: Private
- Industry: Fintech; Online trading Foreign exchange
- Founded: 2017; 9 years ago
- Founders: Iskandar Najjar; Mohammed AlAhmad Ketmawi
- Headquarters: Dubai, United Arab Emirates
- Area served: Middle East, Africa, Europe, Asia
- Key people: Iskandar Najjar (CEO); Mohammed AlAhmad Ketmawi (Chief Managing Director)
- Products: CFD trading, forex brokerage, payment services
- Revenue: US$31.0 million (Equiti Capital UK, 2023)
- Number of employees: 500+ (2023)
- Subsidiaries: Equiti Capital UK Limited; Equiti Global Markets Ltd; EGM Securities Limited; Equiti AM CJSC; Equiti Brokerage (Seychelles) Limited
- Website: equiti.com

Equiti Group is a fintech group headquartered in Dubai, United Arab Emirates, providing online trading technology and multi-asset financial products through a network of regulated brokerage entities. The group was established in 2017 and operates across the Middle East, Africa, Europe, and Asia. Iskandar Najjar is the group's co-founder and chief executive officer.

The group operates through regulated subsidiaries in the United Kingdom, Cyprus, the United Arab Emirates, Jordan, Kenya, Seychelles, and Armenia.

== History ==
Equiti Group was established in 2017 by co-founders Iskandar Najjar and Mohammed AlAhmad Ketmawi, with the aim of delivering trading technology and financial services to historically underserved markets.

In 2018, Divisa Capital the institutional prime brokerage arm of Equiti Group, operating under the legal name Divisa UK Limited was rebranded as Equiti Capital. The Divisa Capital group had been founded in 2008 and comprised several subsidiaries, including Divisa US, Divisa AM (based in Armenia), and Bloom Capital (formerly known as Divisa NZ). During the same year, the group received a brokerage licence from the Jordan Securities Commission in January, and its Kenyan subsidiary became the first locally licensed online foreign exchange trading platform in Kenya after obtaining a licence from the country's Capital Markets Authority in April.

In September 2020, Equiti obtained a licence from the Financial Services Authority of Seychelles.

In 2022, the group expanded its operations by integrating the MetaTrader 5 trading platform. Equiti was granted an over-the-counter derivatives and spot market currencies licence by the UAE Securities and Commodities Authority in April, and the group's Cypriot subsidiary received authorisation from the Cyprus Securities and Exchange Commission (CySEC) in October. Additionally, the Roads and Transport Authority granted Equiti Group the naming rights to the Umm Al Sheif metro station in Dubai for a period of ten years.

Equiti (Dubai Metro), 2025

Throughout 2023, Equiti Group acquired digital payment technology provider Cloud Invest, entered into a memorandum of understanding with MK Enterprise to facilitate expansion into Qatar, launched the Equiti Trader mobile application, and opened a new office in Abu Dhabi. Furthermore, Equiti Capital signed a Statement of Agreement to the FX Global Code of Conduct. In 2023, Equiti Capital UK reported a 2% increase in net trading revenue to $31 million, though net profit fell by over 30% to $1.1 million.

In March 2024, the UAE Securities and Commodities Authority (SCA) issued a warning about MRL Investments Ltd, which operated the website equiiti.com. The SCA stated that the company was not licensed by the authority and had no connection with Equiti. Equiti Group said that it was working with regulators in response to the use of similar branding.

In October 2024, Equiti Group and SIGMA Capital launched Equiti SIGMA, a financial education hub in Cairo, Egypt. In July 2025, the company opened a technology hub named Equiti Labs in Bangalore, India. In May 2026, Equiti Group's Jordan unit became the naming sponsor of the Jordan Tennis Federation's Junior Tennis Initiative through a three-year agreement.

== Legal proceedings ==
In November 2020, Cayman Islands investment fund Dismatrix and two of its subsidiaries brought proceedings against Equiti Capital in the High Court of London. The claimants sought the repayment of part of approximately $13 million in commissions, alleging that Equiti Capital knew or ought to have known of alleged fraudulent activity at Mediatrix Capital. Equiti Capital denied the allegations, describing them as "baseless and without merit".

== Operations and sponsorships ==
Equiti Group's entities offer trading in contracts for difference (CFDs) on forex, cryptocurrencies, commodities, indices, shares, and exchange-traded funds. Trading is facilitated through the MetaTrader 4 and MetaTrader 5 platforms. The Kenyan subsidiary supports mobile payment services such as M-Pesa. In 2019, Equiti Capital partnered with Riyad Bank to provide trading infrastructure and foreign exchange services.

For the financial year 2019, Equiti Capital UK Limited reported pre-tax profits of $569,000 on revenues of $24.6 million. By the financial year 2023, revenues reached US$31.0 million. As of 2023, the group employed over 500 staff worldwide, providing customer service across nine languages.

The company also engages in regional marketing and educational initiatives. Through its FXPesa Academy, it has offered financial education via online and offline centres in East Africa since 2021, and sponsors the podcast Financially Incorrect. In 2024, Equiti became the sleeve sponsor of Al Wahda FC, a professional football club in the United Arab Emirates, renewing the partnership for the 2025/2026 season.

The group has been awarded industry accolades, including "Broker of the Year – Middle East" at the 2023 FinanceFeeds Awards, "Top Trusted Financial Institution in the Middle East" at the 2024 Middle East Financial Markets Awards, and was recognized by the Superbrands programme in the UAE in 2025.
