= Mapic =

Annual international real estate show in Cannes, France

MAPIC
- Founded: 1995
- Founder: Reed Midem
- Purpose: Retail real estate
- Location: Cannes, France
- Origins: MAPIC
- Website: https://www.mapic.com/

MAPIC (Le marché international professionnel de l’implantation commerciale et de la distribution) is an international retail real estate show held in Cannes, France, each November. Organised by Reed MIDEM, and lasting for 3 days, the event consists of conference sessions, an exhibition area and networking events to help facilitate retail real estate development.

Although held in France, participants from several countries attend.

== Conferences ==
The event offers conferences and keynote addresses aimed at retail professionals. The programme typically includes topics such as new retail concepts, multichannel strategies, integrating leisure and culture into the shopping experience, investment and expansion in mature and growing markets.

== Networking at MAPIC ==
Participants have the option to take part in networking sessions, designed to facilitate new business partnerships.

One of the formats offered, Speed Matching, is based on the concept of speed dating. During a 45-minute session, participants meet with 10 potential partners for 3 minutes each, giving them the time for an introduction and exchange of business cards.

Other networking opportunities include the Opening Cocktail and MAPIC Awards ceremony.

== The MAPIC Awards ==
Each year, developers submit their retail real estate projects for a chance to win a MAPIC Award in one of several categories. Three nominees are chosen in each category by a jury of industry professionals. During MAPIC, the jury, as well as MAPIC delegates vote to determine the winners. The awards are then presented during an awards ceremony. MAPIC Award was created in 1996 and initially was focused to target best in class retail concept. From 1996 until 2007 there were nominations for retailers divided into six categories: Clothing & Fashion Accessories, Household & Electrical Goods, Leisure, Catering Outlet, Services and Health & Beauty and the first award's nomination related to commercial real estate developers were launched in 2007.

== Country of Honour ==
Every year, MAPIC names one country as the "Country of Honour", about which there is a series of conference sessions and events. In 2013, the format was slightly changed, and four countries were recognised as "Retail Rising Stars": Brazil, China, India and Russia.
