= National Paints (Dubai Metro) =

Rapid transit station

National Paints دهانات ناشونال

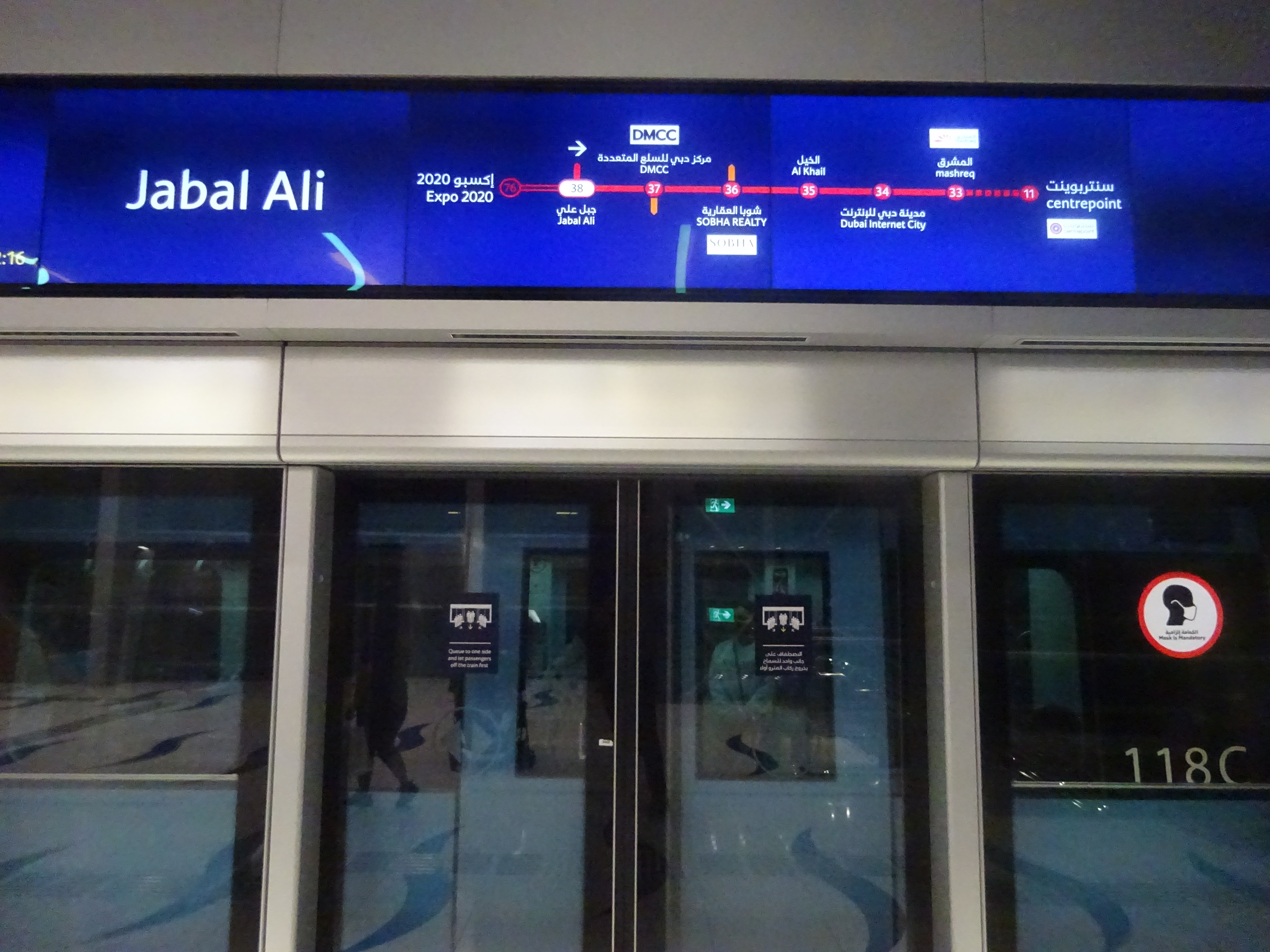
- Sign on the platform at National Paints metro station

General information
- Location: Dubai; United Arab Emirates
- Coordinates: 25.05801°N 55.12729°E
- System: Metro Station
- Line: Red Line Route 2020
- Platforms: 1 island platform on the Red Line; 1 side platform on branch
- Tracks: 2 on the Red Line; 1 on branch
- Connections: RTA Dubai: F57 Jebel Ali MS - Bluewater Island

Construction
- Parking: Station car park to the southeast
- Accessible: yes

Other information
- Station code: 38
- Fare zone: 2

History
- Opened: September 9, 2009 (Red Line); June 1, 2021 (branch); January 1, 2021
- Closed: January 1, 2018
- Rebuilt: January 2, 2018 to April 19, 2019
- Former names: Nakheel Harbour & Tower, Jabal Ali

Services
Preceding station	Dubai Metro	Following station
Ibn Battuta towards Life Pharmacy	Red Line Life Pharmacy branch	DMCC towards Centrepoint
The Gardens towards Expo 2020	Red Line Expo 2020 branch	DMCC towards Centrepoint
Location

National Paints (Arabic: دهانات ناشونال; formerly Nakheel Harbour & Tower and Jabal Ali) is a rapid transit station on the Red Line of the Dubai Metro in Dubai, UAE.

The station is one of three stations on the system with a dedicated park and ride lot, the others being Centrepoint and etisalat by e&.

Until May 2020, the station was named Nakheel Harbour & Tower. The station was closed and became a ghost station as it was being reconstructed to allow the platform and track layout to accommodate the Route 2020 extension. The station reopened on January 1, 2021.

== Location ==
National Paints station is in the southwestern section of Dubai, bordering the built-up developments of Jumeirah Lake Towers and the Dubai Marina. Specifically, it lies to the north of exit 29 on Sheikh Zayed Road.

=== Nearby development ===
Unlike most metro stations, there is no development near National Paints Station. Its former namesake, Nakheel Harbour and Tower, was a planned large-scale development of around 270 hectares (1 sq mi) that would have comprised Nakheel Tower, which would have been the tallest skyscraper in the world, as well as the world's largest inner-city marina. Due to the Great Recession, the project was never constructed.

== History ==
The station opened under the name of "Nakheel Harbour and Tower" as one of the original stations of the Dubai Metro, beginning service on 9 September 2009. At the time, it acted as the western terminus of the Red Line; an extension westward to the Ibn Battuta Mall opened on 30 April 2010, making Nakheel Harbour and Tower a through station.

The track layout east of National Paints Station (formally Jabal Ali) was modified to create a new "Route 2020" branch to Expo 2020 and two additional platforms to the southeast which are used to serve the new route. The branch connects to the Red Line just to the northeast of the station. The extension was partially opened on 1 January 2021, with trains running a shuttle service between National Paints and Al Furjan. The line was extended to Expo 2020 on 1 June 2021. The route is expected to have 275,000 users each day by 2030.

On June 26, 2025, the station got renamed to National Paints

== Station layout ==
As with many stations on the Red Line, National Paints Station lies on a viaduct paralleling the eastern side of Sheikh Zayed Road. It is a type 1 elevated station with two side platforms and two tracks on the Red Line. It also connects to the Route 2020 branch line. Passengers access the station through a concourse at ground level.

G	Street level	Exit/Entrance
L1	Concourse	Automatic Fare control, station agent, Metro Card vending machines, crossover
L2	Side platform | Doors will open on the Right
L2	Platform 2 Southbound	Towards ← Life Pharmacy; Next Station: Ibn Battuta
L2	Platform 1 Northbound	Towards → Centrepoint; Next Station: DMCC; Passengers may alight at the next station for Dubai Tram
L2	Island platform | P1 & P3 doors will open on the Right
L2	Platform 3 Eastbound	Towards ← Expo 2020; Next Station: The Gardens
L2	Platform 4 Northbound	Towards → Centrepoint; Next Station: DMCC; Passengers may alight at the next station for Dubai Tram
L2	Side platform | Doors will open on the Right
L2

|}
