= The Gardens (Dubai Metro) =

Metro station in Dubai, United Arab Emirates

The Gardens الحدائق

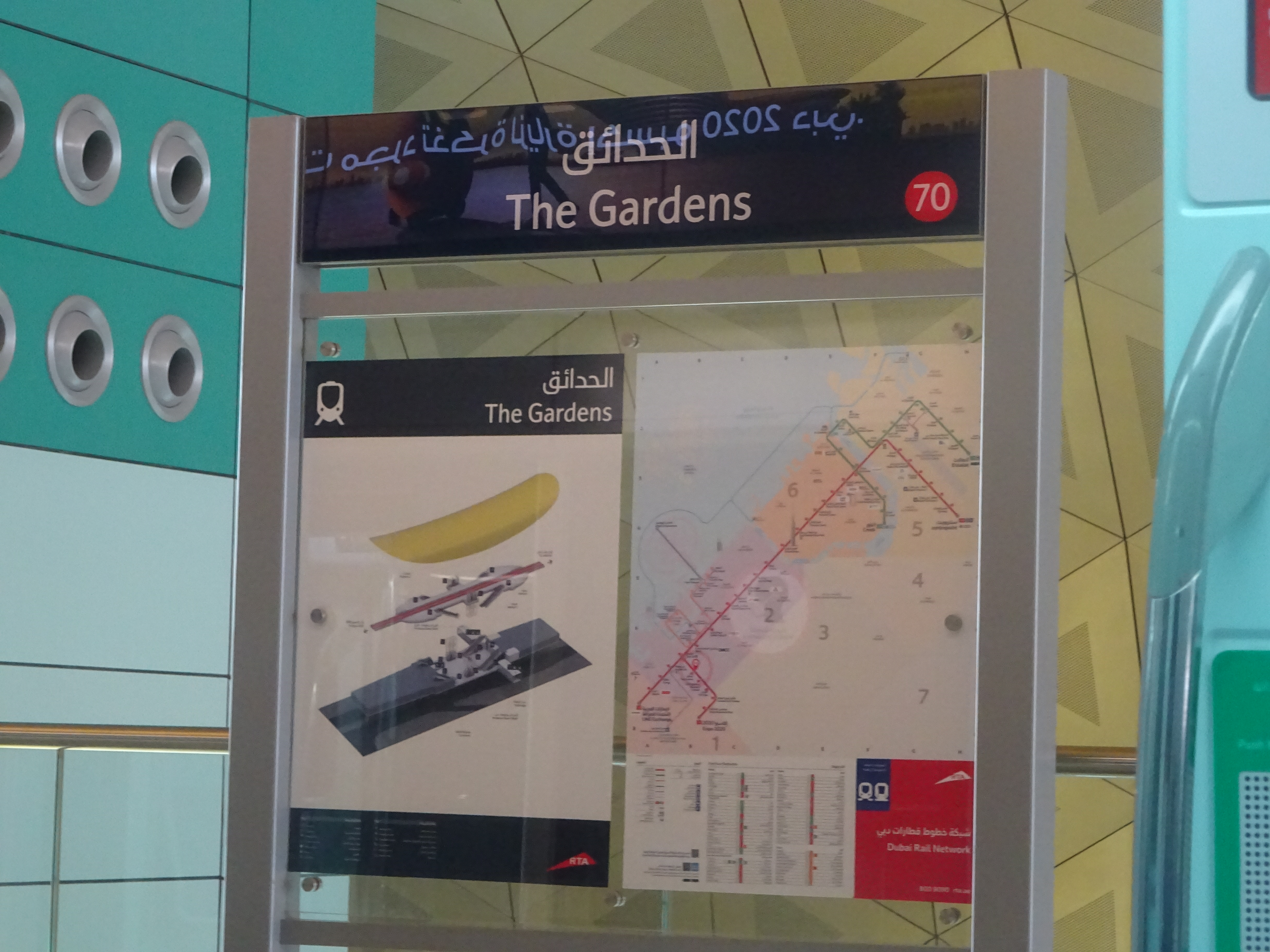
- The Gardens metro station platform sign

General information
- Location: The Gardens; Jebel Ali, Dubai; United Arab Emirates
- Coordinates: 25.04333°N 55.13520°E
- System: Metro Station
- Operator: Dubai Metro
- Line: Red Line
- Platforms: 2
- Tracks: 2
- Connections: RTA Dubai: F43 Ibn Battuta Stn. - Discovery Gardens.; F46 Ibn Battuta Stn. - Dubai Investment Park 2

Other information
- Station code: 70
- Fare zone: 2

History
- Opened: 1 January 2021

Services
| Preceding station | Dubai Metro | Following station |
|---|---|---|
| Discovery Gardens towards Expo 2020 | Red Line Expo 2020 branch | Jabal Ali towards Centrepoint |
Route map
Location

The Gardens (Arabic: الحدائق) is a rapid transit station on the Red Line of the Dubai Metro in Dubai, UAE, serving The Gardens and surrounding areas in Jebel Ali.

The station opened as part of Route 2020, created to link to Expo 2020, on 1 January 2021. It is located on an elevated section of the metro above Gardens Boulevard (D591) and Ibn Battuta Street, on the northeast boundary of The Gardens with Discovery Gardens.

== Station layout ==
| G | Street level | Exit/Entrance |
| L1 | Mezzanine | Automatic Fare Collection gates, station agent, crossover |
| L2 | Side platform | Doors will open on the right |
| L2 | Platform 1 Southbound | Towards ← Centrepoint; Next Station: National Paints; Passengers heading towards Life Pharmacy may alight at the next station |
| L2 | Platform 2 Northbound | Towards → Expo 2020; Next Station: Discovery Gardens |
| L2 | Side platform | Doors will open on the right |
