= GGICO (Dubai Metro) =

Metro station in Dubai, United Arab Emirates

Al Garhoud القرهود

General information
- Location: Al Garhoud; Dubai, United Arab Emirates
- Coordinates: 38°00′00″N 23°47′08″E
- System: Metro Station
- Operator: Dubai Metro
- Line: Red Line
- Platforms: 2 side
- Tracks: 2
- Connections: RTA Dubai: F4 Sabkha, Turnoff - Al Garhoud MS

Construction
- Structure type: Elevated

Other information
- Station code: 15
- Fare zone: 5

History
- Opened: 15 May 2010

Services
Preceding station	Dubai Metro	Following station
City Centre Deira towards Expo 2020 or Life Pharmacy	Red Line	Airport Terminal 1 towards Centrepoint
Location

Al Garhoud (Arabic: القرهود; formerly GGICO) is a rapid transit station on the Red Line of the Dubai Metro in Dubai, UAE.

The station is commonly known as Garhoud Station and opened on 15 May 2010.

The station is named for GGICO (Gulf General Investment Company), a Dubai Financial Market listed public shareholding company established in 1973. Beyond this station, the metro line goes underground.

On April 14, 2025, the station has officially been renamed as Al Garhoud

== Station layout ==
G	Street level	Exit/Entrance
L1	Concourse	Automatic Fare Collection gates, station agent, crossover
L2	Side platform | Doors will open on the right
L2	Platform 1 Eastbound	Towards ← Centrepoint; Next Station: Airport Terminal 1
L2	Platform 2 Westbound	Towards → Life Pharmacy / Expo 2020; Next Station: City Centre Deira
L2	Side platform | Doors will open on the right
