= Al Furjan =

Property development and neighbourhood in Dubai, UAE

Al Jad
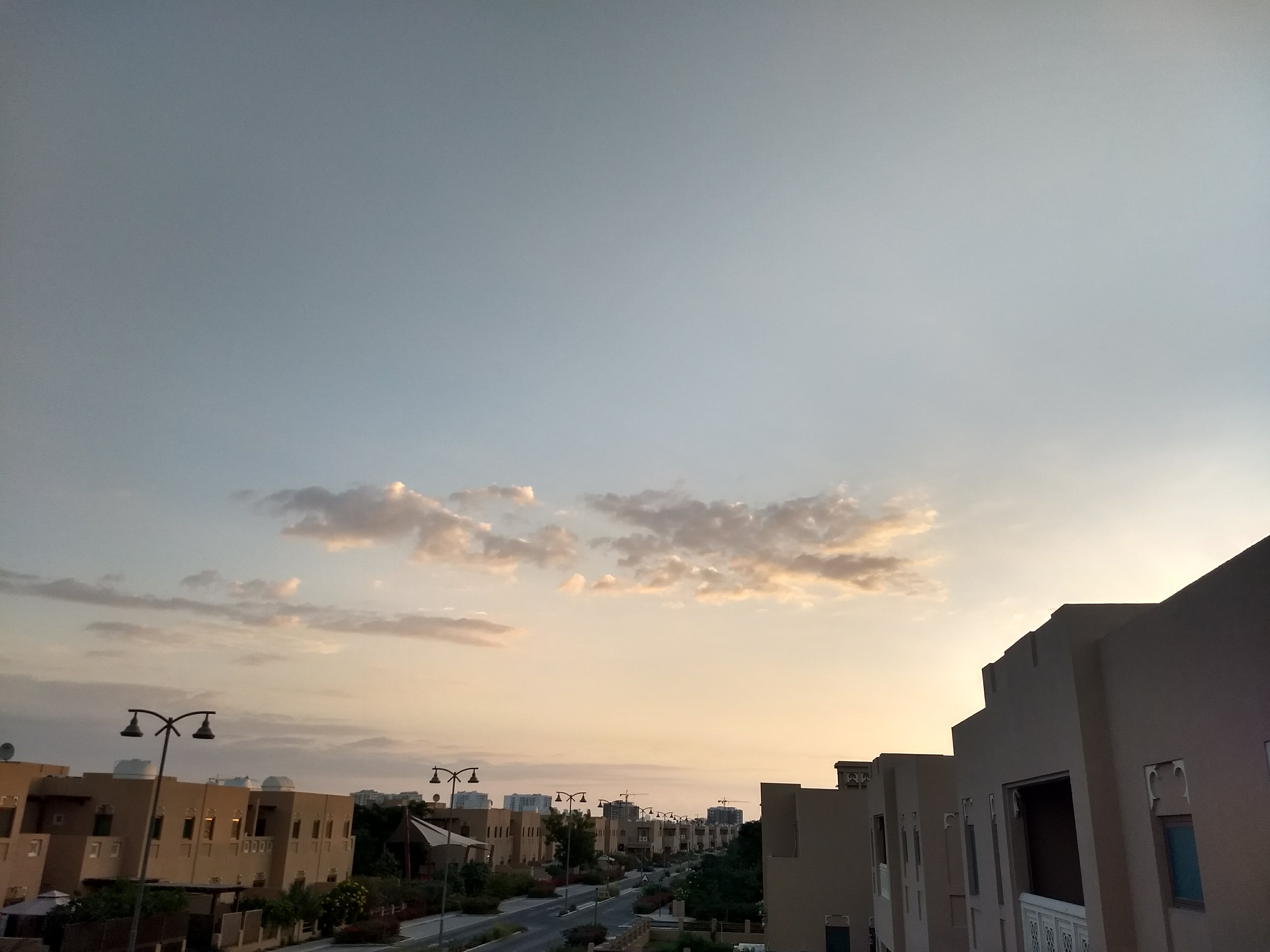
- View in Al Furjan

Project
- Construction started: 2008
- Status: In progress
- Developer: Nakheel Properties

Location
- Location within Dubai Location within United Arab Emirates
- Coordinates: 25°1′30.72″N 55°8′45.24″E
- Country: United Arab Emirates
- City: Dubai
- District: Jebel Ali
- Location: Dubai, United Arab Emirates

Area
  - Total: 560 ha (1,400 acres)

Population (2021)
  - Total: 26,000

Al Furjan is an upscale residential community located in Jebel Ali, Dubai, United Arab Emirates. It is developed primarily by Nakheel Properties, with a significant number of buildings constructed by Azizi Developments. The community borders Jebel Ali Village and is situated near Ibn Battuta Mall, the Gardens, and the Expo 2020 site. Residential units in Al Furjan are typically designed in three architectural styles: Al Hejaz (traditional Arabic), Dubai (local), and Quortaj (Islamic/Mediterranean).

In addition to developments by Nakheel and Azizi, Al Furjan also features buildings by other developers, including Al Jaziri Brothers, CPL Real Estate Development, Danube Properties, Deyaar Development, Diamond Real Estate Developers, Ghreiwati Properties, Invest Group Overseas, Jag Development, MAG Property Development, Meilenstein Real Estate Development, Mira Developments, Samana Developers, Seen Real Estate Developers, and Wasl Properties.

== History ==
The first phase of Al Furjan, focused on the East and South villages, was announced in September 2007. All 800 villas and terrace homes sold out within a week. Phase two targeted the North and West villages. In June 2008, Nakheel awarded the first major construction contract—valued at AED 3 billion—to Arabtec Holding PJSC to build 1,400 homes. A second contract was awarded to Al Shafar Transport and Contracting Company to construct villas and terraced homes.

As of July 2021, the development remains in phase one. Initially, the project was scheduled for completion in 2011 and was planned to include 4,000 residences, several hotels, restaurants, and retail outlets, ultimately housing up to 90,000 people. Construction was halted in 2009, but resumed by the end of the year for short-term projects, with Al Shafar being the first contractor to restart work. Arabtec suspended construction again in January 2010 due to unpaid arrears.

Mohammed Rashed has served as the project director since its inception.

== Nakheel ==
Construction on Nakheel's core Al Furjan community began in 2009, with an original completion date set for 2011 and an estimated cost of US$1.5 billion.

Al Furjan by Nakheel is a villa sub-community and was the first area developed. Masakin Al Furjan is a low-rise, family-oriented community comprising seven blocks located in the South Village. Marooj Al Furjan, a villa community with 418 homes, began construction in 2021 and is slated for completion in 2024.

All 418 homes were sold as off-plan properties and sold out within four hours.

The Al Furjan Pavilion, located in Al Furjan South and built by Nakheel, opened in December 2016. It includes a Spinneys supermarket, a Medicentre clinic a 300-space car park, a recreation center for members, and a variety of retail and dining outlets.

== Azizi ==
Although Nakheel is the main developer, Azizi Developments has a significant presence in Al Furjan. As of February 2021, Azizi had completed 18 residential buildings in the area. Their Yasamine, Feriouz, Orchid, Acacia, Tulip, Aster, Liatris, Freesia, Daisy, and Iris buildings all opened in 2017.

The Roy-Mediterranean and Montrell, both serviced apartments buildings, were announced in 2016 and opened in 2018, featuring high-end units. The Samia, which includes a mosque and nursery, and the Ferista also opened in 2018. The Pearl and The Plaza opened in 2019, while The Farishta was completed in 2020. The Shaista opened in early 2021, and The Star, featuring nearly 500 apartments and 13 retail spaces, opened in mid-2021. The Berton, which began construction in 2017 and was originally scheduled to open in 2019, is expected to be completed by the end of 2021.

== Education ==
At the time of its launch in 2007, two schools were planned for Al Furjan.

The Arbor School opened in 2018, initially offering preschool through year six. It has since expanded year by year and follows the National Curriculum for England. It is considered the first eco-school in the UAE.

A branch of Jebel Ali Village Nursery, serving children aged 18 months to 4 years, is located in Al Furjan South.

In 2021, Arcadia Education announced the opening of its third campus in Al Furjan, catering up to year eleven students.

== Religious buildings ==
Al Furjan West includes a mosque situated adjacent to the Al Furjan West Pavilion. Another mosque is located in Al Furjan South. There are currently no synagogues, temples, or churches within the community. Non-Muslim residents typically attend religious services in nearby Jebel Ali.

== Transport ==
Al Furjan is served by the Al Furjan Metro Station, which is part of the Dubai Metro's Route 2020 extension to the Red Line, developed for Expo 2020.
