= Jumeirah Golf Estates (Dubai Metro) =

Rapid-transit Metro Station in Dubai, UAE

Jumeirah Golf Estates عقارات جميرا للجولف

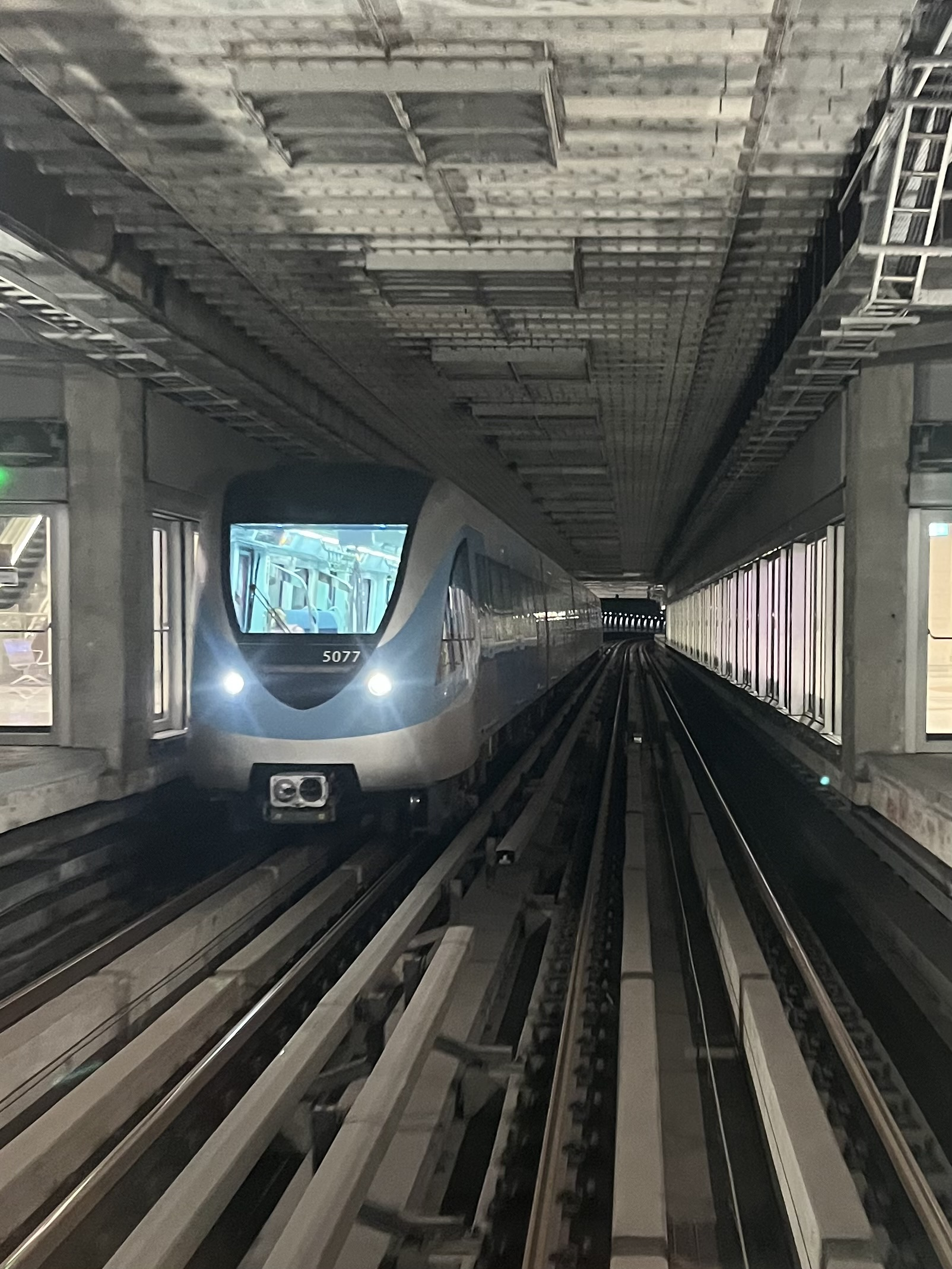
- Red Line train at the station

General information
- Location: Jumeirah Golf Estates, Me'aisem 1 Dubai; United Arab Emirates
- Coordinates: 25.0053°N 55.1557°E
- System: Metro Station
- Operator: Dubai Metro
- Line: Red Line
- Platforms: 2
- Tracks: 2
- Connections: RTA Dubai: F38 Jumeirah Golf Estate MS - Dubai Production City

Construction
- Structure type: Underground
- Parking: Yes

Other information
- Station code: 73
- Fare zone: 3

History
- Opened: 1 September 2021

Services
Preceding station	Dubai Metro	Following station
Dubai Investment Park towards Expo 2020	Red Line Expo 2020 branch	Al Furjan towards Centrepoint
Route map
Location

Jumeirah Golf Estates (Arabic: عقارات جميرا للجولف) is a rapid transit station on the Red Line of the Dubai Metro in Dubai, UAE, serving Jumeirah Golf Estates.

The metro station opened on 1 September 2021 as part of Route 2020, created to link central Dubai to the Expo 2020 exhibition site. The schedule has been delayed due to the COVID-19 pandemic.

The station is one of two underground stations on the Red Line's Expo 2020 branch, along with the Dubai Investment Park metro station. It is located at Jumeirah Golf Estates. Facilities include bus stops, disabled parking, retail units, and a taxi drop-off zone.

== Station layout ==
G	Street level	Exit/Entrance
L1	Mezzanine	Automatic Fare Collection gates, station agent, crossover
L2	Side platform | Doors will open on the right
L2	Platform 1 Northbound	Towards ← Centrepoint; Next Station: Al Furjan
L2	Platform 2 Southbound	Towards → Expo 2020; Next Station: Dubai Investments Park
L2	Side platform | Doors will open on the right
