= Al Furjan (Dubai Metro) =

Metro station in Dubai, United Arab Emirates

Al Furjan الفرجان

General information
- Location: Al Furjan; Jabal Ali 1, Dubai; United Arab Emirates
- Coordinates: 25.03054°N 55.15253°E
- System: Metro Station
- Operator: Dubai Metro
- Line: Red Line
- Platforms: 2
- Tracks: 2
- Connections: RTA Dubai: F45 Discovery Garden MS - Al Furjan

Other information
- Station code: 72
- Fare zone: 2

History
- Opened: 1 January 2021

Services
Preceding station	Dubai Metro	Following station
Jumeirah Golf Estates towards Expo 2020	Red Line Expo 2020 branch	Discovery Gardens towards Centrepoint
Route map
Location

Al Furjan (Arabic: الفرجان) is a rapid transit station on the Red Line of the Dubai Metro in Dubai, UAE, serving Al Furjan and surrounding areas in Jebel Ali.

The station opened as part of Route 2020, created to link to Expo 2020, on 1 January 2021. It is located on an elevated section of the metro above Gardens Boulevard, on the boundary between Al Furjan and Discovery Gardens. Until 31 May 2021, it was the final station in operation on Route 2020. Beyond this station, the metro line goes underground again.

== Station layout ==
G	Street level	Exit/Entrance
L1	Mezzanine	Automatic Fare Collection gates, station agent, crossover
L2	Side platform | Doors will open on the right
L2	Platform 1 Northbound	Towards ← Centrepoint; Next Station: Discovery Gardens
L2	Platform 2 Southbound	Towards → Expo 2020; Next Station: Jumeirah Golf Estates
L2	Side platform | Doors will open on the right
