= The Gardens, Dubai =

The Gardens الحدائق
- Community
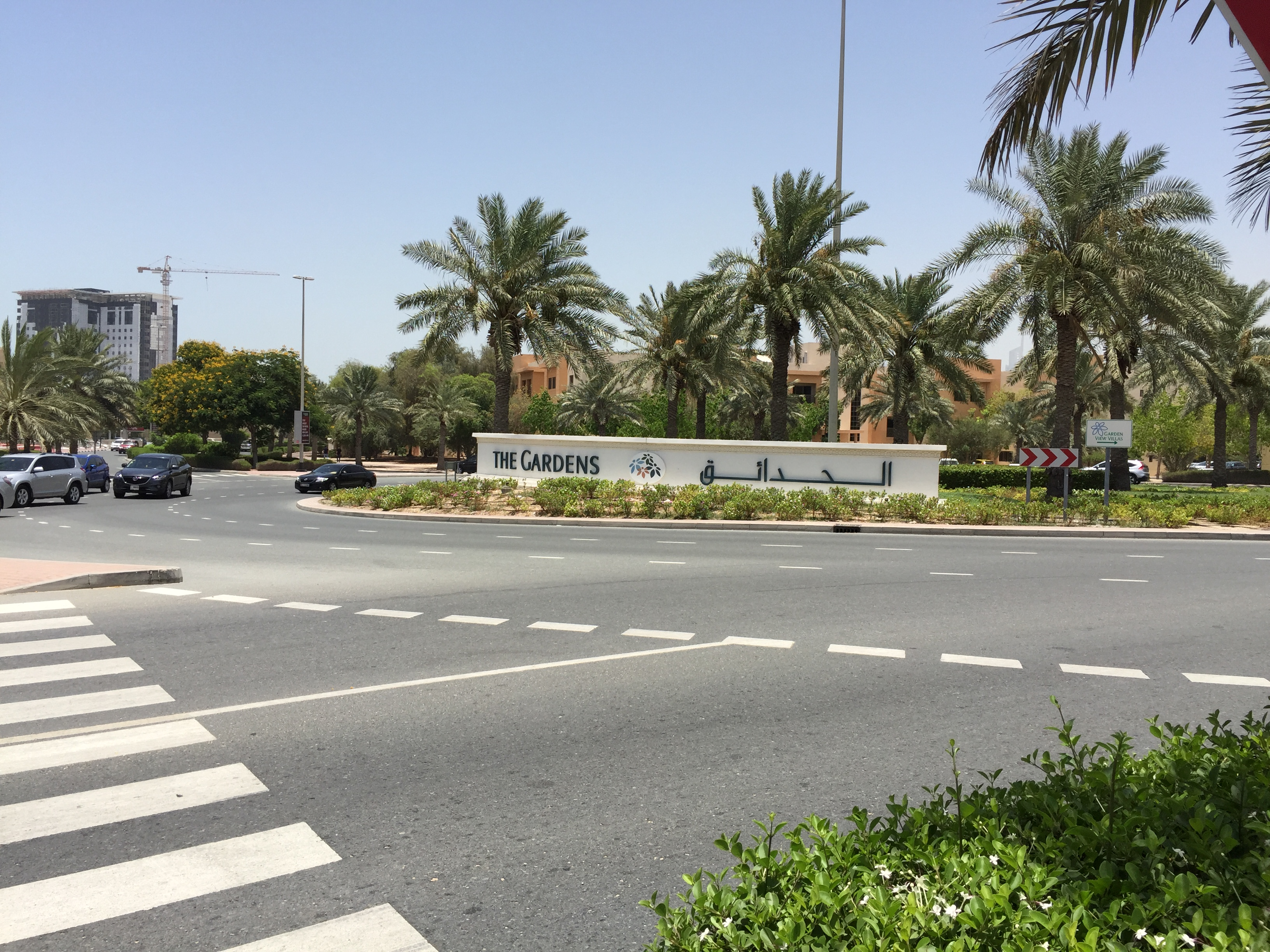
- Roundabout in The Gardens

- Location within Dubai, UAE The Gardens (United Arab Emirates)
- Coordinates: 25°02′35.2″N 55°07′37.1″E
- Country: United Arab Emirates
- Emirate: Emirate of Dubai
- City: Dubai
- The Gardens: 2001

Population (2022)
  - Total: 23,000

The Gardens is a suburban neighborhood in the Jebel Ali district of Dubai, United Arab Emirates.

== History ==
The Gardens community is in the northeast part of the Jebel Ali Village area. The original Jebel Ali Village was constructed in 1977 to provide accommodation to construction contractors' staff. At this time, Sheikh Rashid bin Saeed Al Maktoum planned to develop Jebel Ali into an industrial area with its own airport (now Al Maktoum International Airport to the south), port (now the Port of Jebel Ali), and township (now Jebel Ali). The area was effectively a small British-style garden city and a project of Sir William Halcrow and Partners.

In later development by Nakheel Properties, the first residents moved into properties in The Gardens during August 2001, with space for 10,000 residents in landscaped grounds.

In late 2023, construction began on the refurbishing of on some of the apartment buildings, to be rebranded as Gardens View Apartments, with many residents given eviction notices.

== Location ==
The location is served by The Gardens metro station, a Dubai Metro station on the Route 2020 branch of the Red Line for Expo 2020.

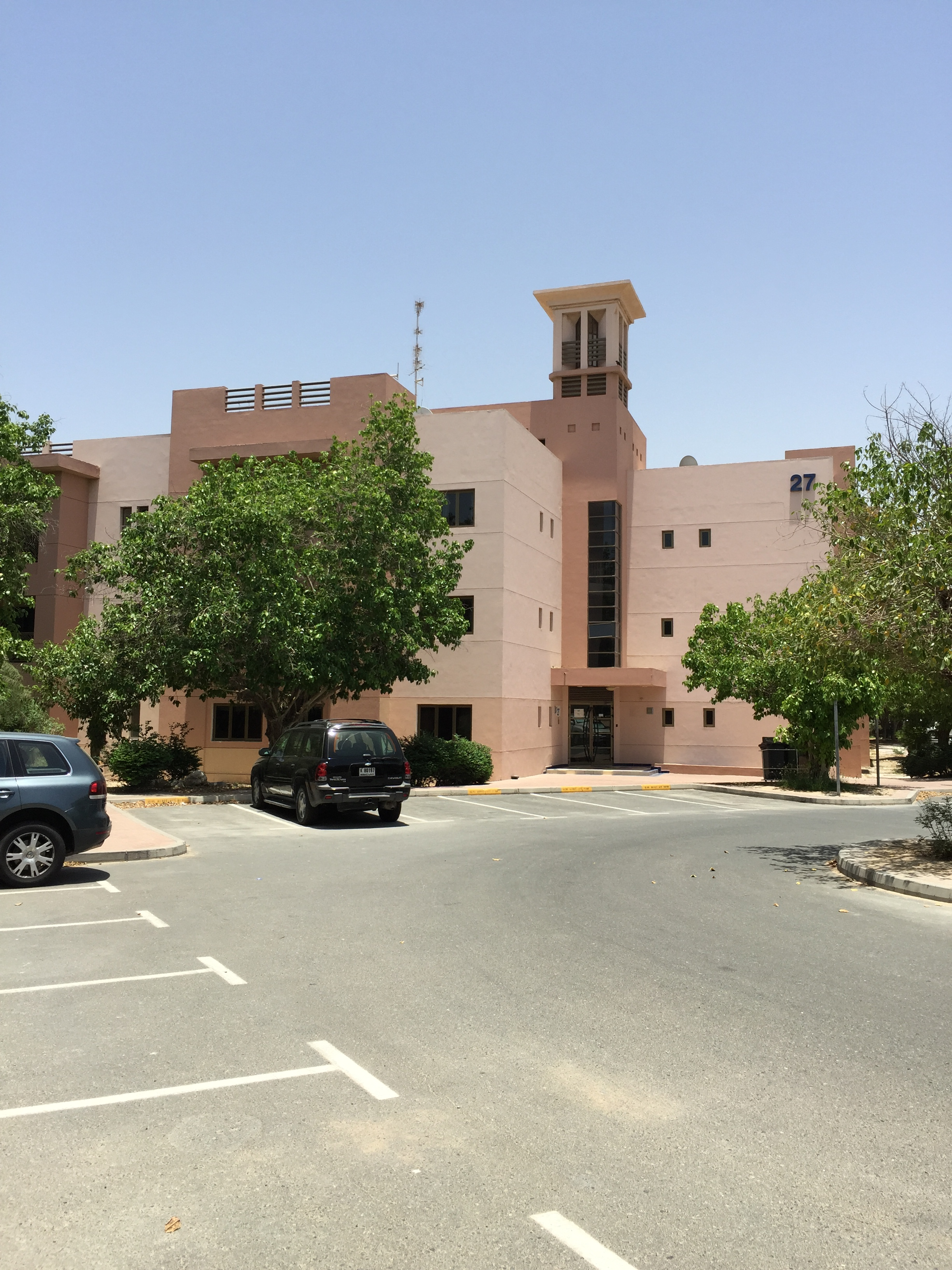
Residential building in The Gardens

There are around 286 houses and 129 low-rise apartment buildings. It lies between Discovery Gardens to the northeast, the main Jebel Ali Village area to the south, and Sheikh Zayed Road to the northwest. Ibn Battuta Mall is a large themed shopping mall immediately adjacent to the northwest of The Garden, with its own metro station.

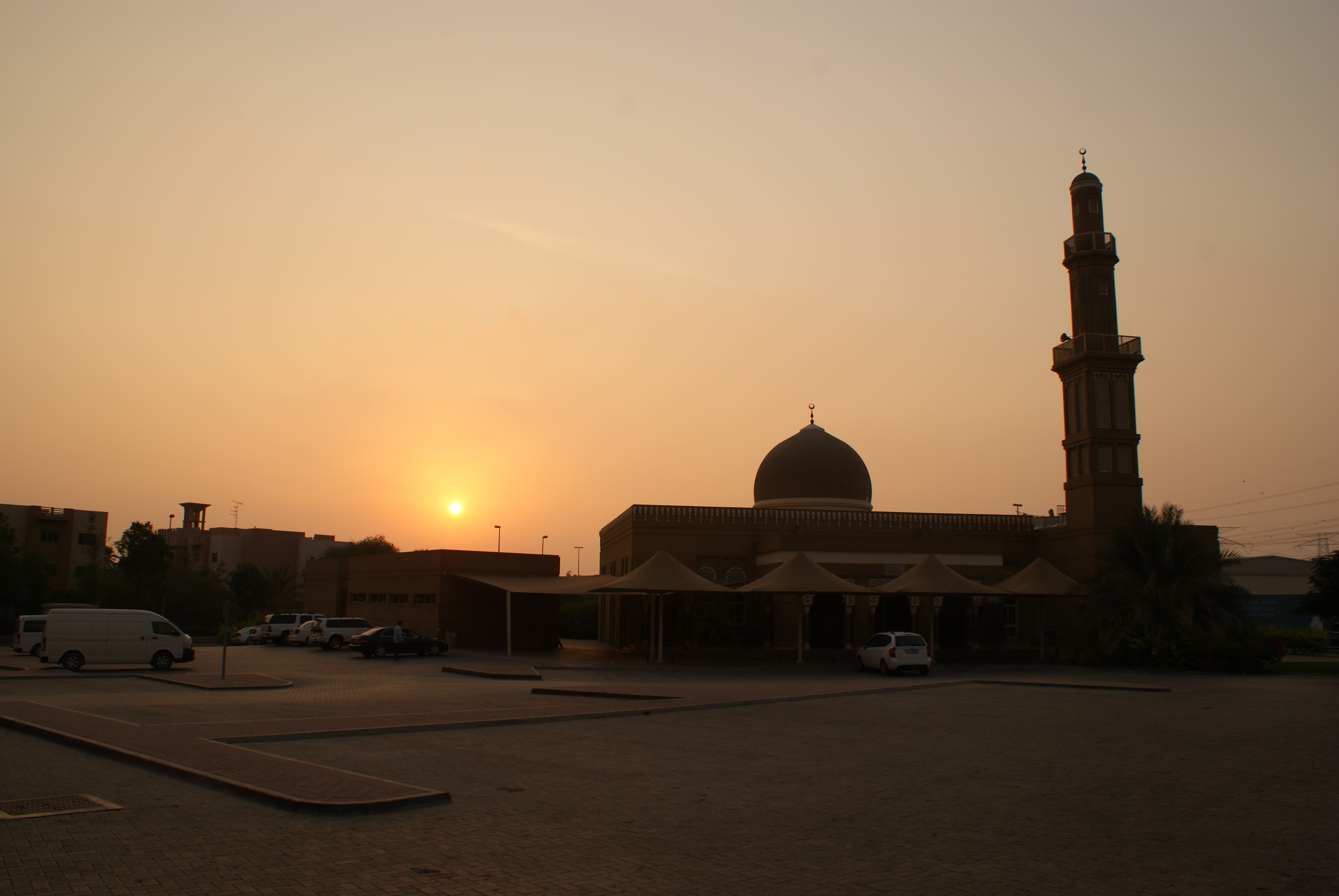
View of the Omar Bin Abdul Aziz Mosque in The Gardens

The Winchester School and the Dubai branch of the Delhi Private School are located on the southwest side of the neighborhood. The Gardens Cricket Ground and Football pitch is also located here. The Omar Bin Abdul Aziz Mosque is on the edge of The Gardens to the north. Foxes have been found in the area.

== Amenities ==
- Better Gents Salon
- Magic Touch Women's Salon

=== Shopping ===
- Al Maya Supermarket
- Fajer Al Madina Supermarket
- Perumal Flowers Store

=== Restaurants ===
- Anjappar Chettinad Restaurant
- Kaara Saaram Restaurant
- T Nagar Cafe
- GrillO Restaurant
- King's Darbar Restaurant

=== Education ===
- Little Diamond Nursery
- Chubby Cheeks Nursery
- Delhi Private School Dubai
- The Winchester School, Jebel Ali
- Siddhi Dance and Arts Centre

=== Sports and Recreation ===
- Cricket Ground
- Basketball Court
- Community Park
- Football Court
- Three Swimming Pools
- Tennis Court
- Badminton Court

== See also ==
- Discovery Gardens
- Jebel Ali
