= Discovery Gardens =

Discovery Gardens ديسكفري جاردنز
- Community
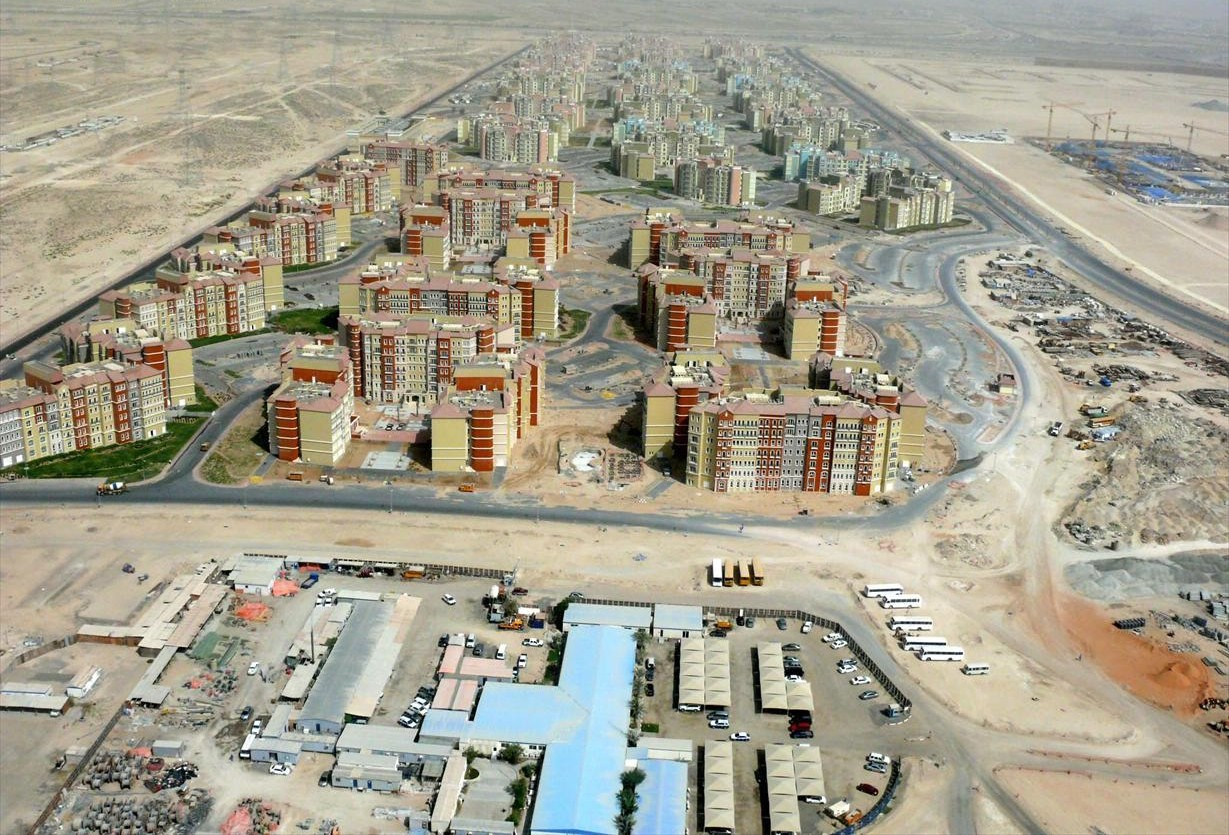
- Aerial view of Discovery Gardens

- Location within Dubai, UAE Discovery Gardens (United Arab Emirates)
- Coordinates: 25.03295°N 55.15536°E
- Country: United Arab Emirates
- Emirate: Emirate of Dubai
- City: Dubai
- Discovery Gardens: 2008

Discovery Gardens (Arabic: ديسكفري جاردنز) is a neighbourhood in the Jebel Ali district of Dubai, United Arab Emirates.

== History ==
Discovery Gardens forms the northern part of the Jebel Ali Village area. The original Jebel Ali Village was constructed in 1977 to provide accommodation to construction contractors' staff. At this time, Sheikh Rashid bin Saeed Al Maktoum planned to develop Jebel Ali into an industrial area with its own airport (now Al Maktoum International Airport to the south), port (now the Port of Jebel Ali), and township (now Jebel Ali). The area was effectively a small British-style garden city and a project of Sir William Halcrow and Partners.

The area was later developed by Nakheel Properties from 2008 onwards. In 2012, there were security issues at Discovery Gardens. In 2013, the area was affected by floods. There have been rent waivers for residents and commercial properties during the COVID-19 pandemic.

== Location ==
Discovery Gardens lies between Sheikh Zayed Road and Emirates Road in the southern suburbs of Dubai. The locality is close to Al Furjan, the main Jebel Ali Village area to the south, and The Gardens. The area is also near the Expo 2020 site. It has been described as "The greenest area of New Dubai" due to the gardens that surround it.

The location is served by the Discovery Gardens metro station on the Dubai Metro, one of the stations on the Route 2020 extension to the Red Line for Expo 2020.

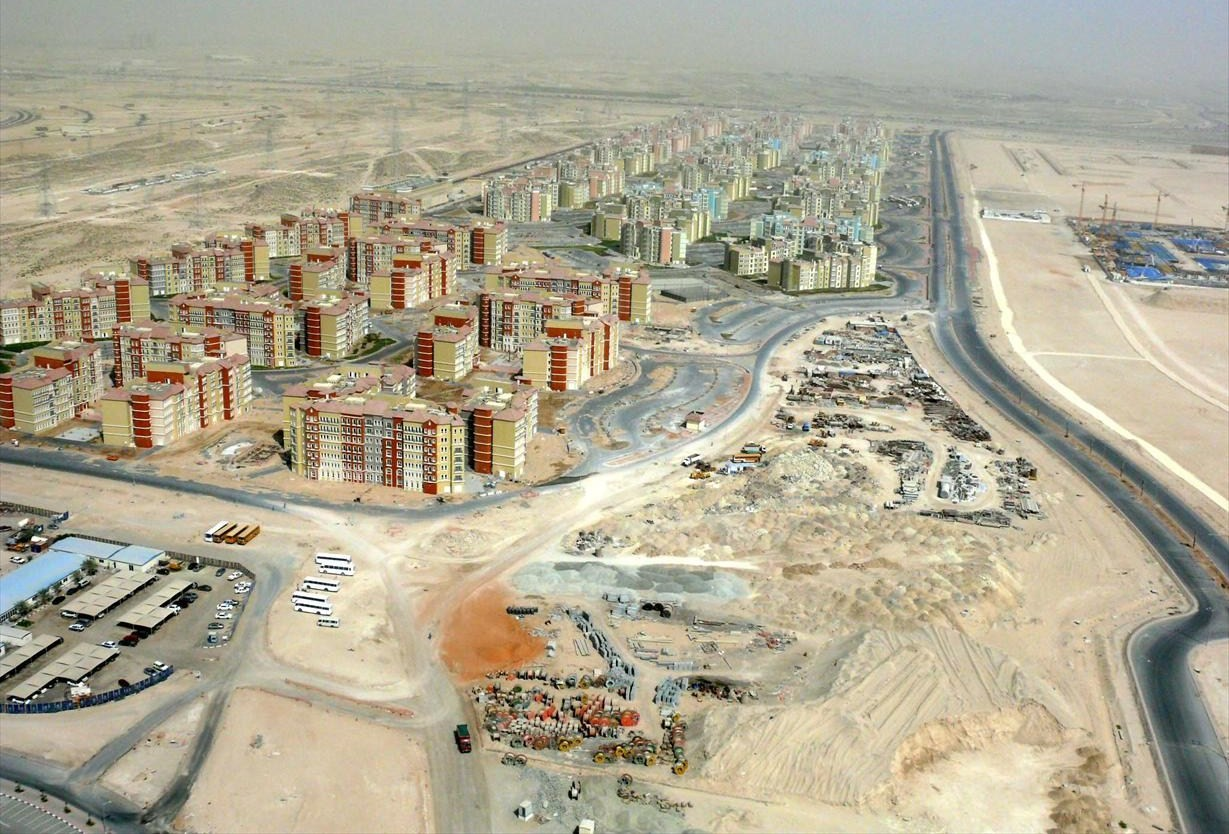
Discovery Gardens on 8 May 2008

There are nearly 300 buildings including more than 26,000 apartments, 200 retail shops, and three medical centres.

== Culture ==
The area features in the 2011 novel Desperate in Dubai and the 2019 book Temporary Cities: Resisting Transience in Arabia.

== See also ==
- Ibn Battuta Mall, a nearby themed shopping mall owned by Nakheel Properties
