= DMCC (Dubai Metro) =

Rapid transit station in the UAE

DMCC مركز دبي للسلع المتعددة

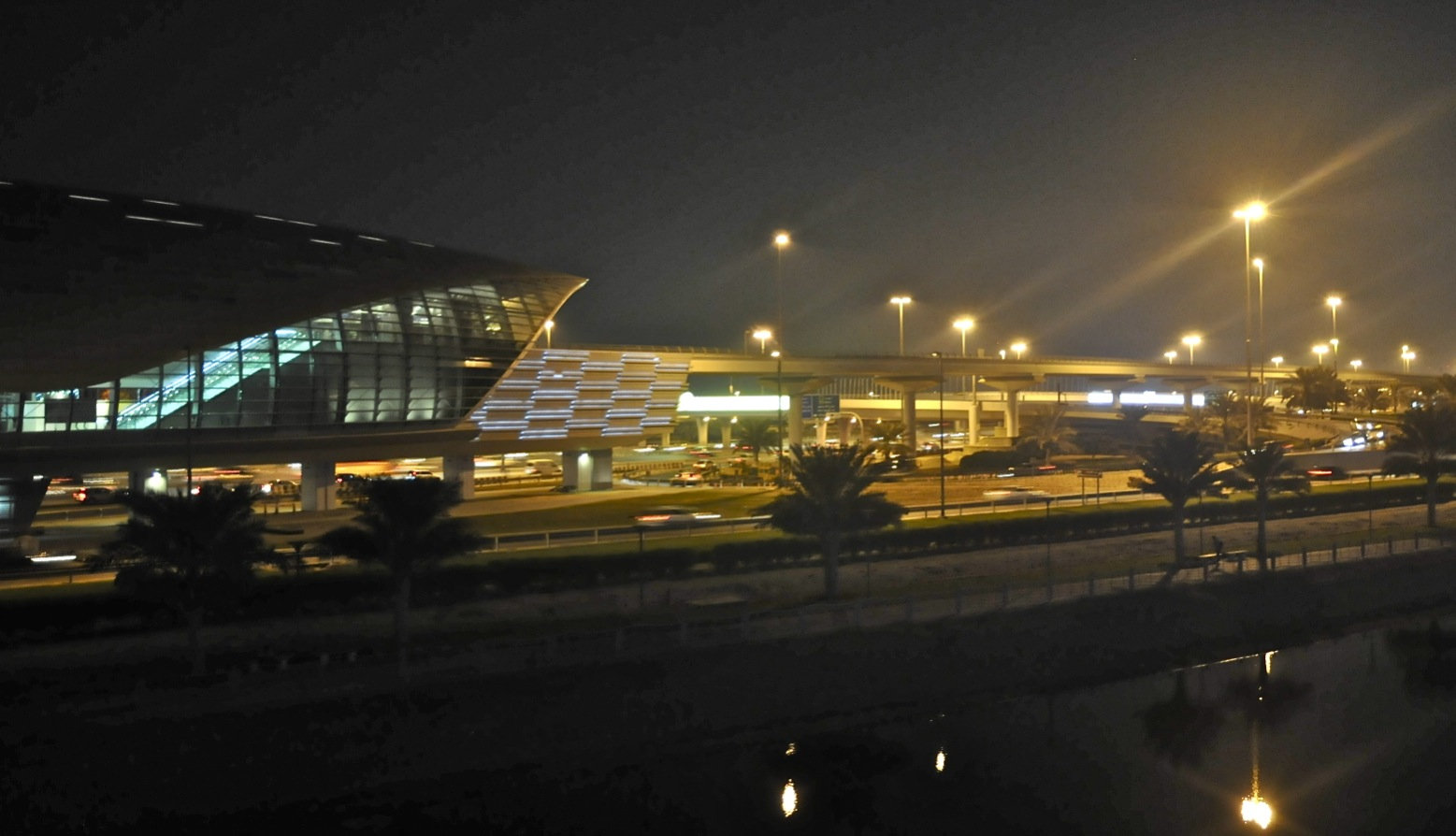
- DMCC metro station at night

General information
- Location: Al Thanyah Fifth, Dubai; United Arab Emirates
- Coordinates: 25°04′15″N 55°08′19″E
- System: Metro Station
- Line: Red Line
- Platforms: 2 side platforms
- Tracks: 2
- Connections: RTA Dubai: JLT2 DMCC MS - JLT, Silver Tower; 91 Al Ghubaiba Bus Stn - Jebel Ali Bus Stn; X92 Al Ghubaiba Bus Stn - Parco Hypermarket Dubai Tram (Jumeirah Lakes Towers Stn.)

Construction
- Accessible: yes

Other information
- Station code: 37
- Fare zone: 2

History
- Opened: October 15, 2010
- Closed: April 16, 2024
- Former names: Jumeirah Lakes Towers

Passengers
- 2011: 1.785 million ▲562.5%

Services
Preceding station	Dubai Metro	Following station
Jabal Ali towards Expo 2020 or Life Pharmacy	Red Line	Sobha Realty towards Centrepoint
Location

DMCC (Arabic: مركز دبي للسلع المتعددة; formerly Jumeirah Lakes Towers) is a rapid transit station on the Red Line of the Dubai Metro in Dubai, UAE.

The station opened on 15 October 2010 as Jumeirah Lakes Towers, along with four other intermediate stations on the Red Line. The station is named after Dubai Multi Commodities Centre.

The station closed on 16 April 2024 due to flood along with other stations that have been affected due to flood but it reopened in May 2024 after modifications

== Location ==
DMCC station is situated at the southern end of both the Jumeirah Lakes Towers and Dubai Marina developments, the former to the east and the latter to the west of the station. It is the closest Metro stop to many well-known buildings, including Almas Tower.

== Station layout ==
DMCC station lies on a viaduct paralleling the eastern side of Sheikh Zayed Road. It is characterised as a type 2 elevated station, indicating that it utilises a side platform setup with two tracks and an elevated concourse between street and platform level. Pedestrian access is aided by skybridges across Sheikh Zayed Road, with entrances near Indigo Tower to the east and Horizon Tower to the left.

G	Street level	Exit/Entrance
L1	Concourse	Automatic Fare Collection gates, station agent, crossover
L2	Side platform | Doors will open on the right
L2	Platform 2 Southbound	Towards ← Life Pharmacy / Expo 2020; Next Station: National Paints; Passengers heading towards Life Pharmacy or Expo 2020 may alight at the next station
L2	Platform 1 Northbound	Towards → Centrepoint; Next Station: Sobha Realty; Passengers may alight at the next station for Dubai Tram
L2	Side platform | Doors will open on the right

== Developments ==
From January 2018 to April 2019, the Red Line between the DMCC and Ibn Battuta stations was closed for an extension to the Dubai Metro system. The station acted as the western terminus for trains from Rashidiya due to the suspension of the Red Line between Jumeirah Lake Towers and Ibn Batutta in order to accommodate the Expo 2020 extension constructed at Nakheel Harbour & Tower. A crossover to the west of the station facilitated the reversal of trains.
