= Discovery Gardens (Dubai Metro) =

Metro station in Dubai, United Arab Emirates

Discovery Gardens حدائق دسكوفري

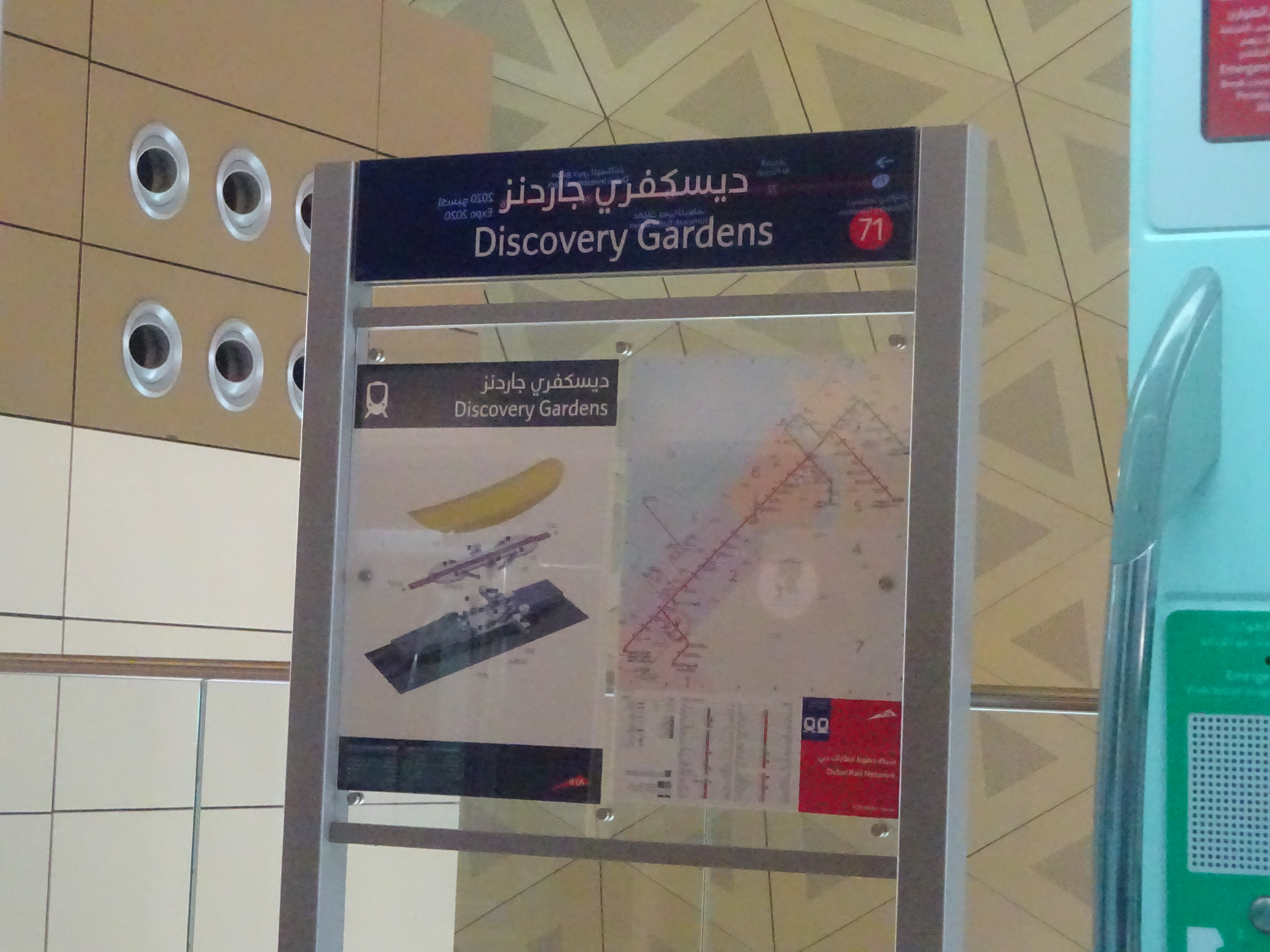
- Discovery Gardens metro station platform sign

General information
- Location: Discovery Gardens; Jebel Ali, Dubai; United Arab Emirates
- Coordinates: 25.03528°N 55.14541°E
- System: Metro Station
- Operator: Dubai Metro
- Line: Red Line
- Platforms: 2
- Tracks: 2
- Connections: RTA Dubai: F45 Discovery Garden MS - Al Furjan

Other information
- Station code: 71
- Fare zone: 2

History
- Opened: 1 January 2021

Services
Preceding station	Dubai Metro	Following station
Al Furjan towards Expo 2020	Red Line Expo 2020 branch	The Gardens towards Centrepoint
Route map
Location

Discovery Gardens (Arabic: ديسكفري جاردنز) is a rapid transit station on the Expo 2020 branch of the Red Line of the Dubai Metro in Dubai, UAE, serving Discovery Gardens and surrounding areas in Jebel Ali.

The station opened as part of Route 2020, created to link to Expo 2020, on 1 January 2021. It is located on an elevated section of the metro above Gardens Boulevard (D591), on the southwest boundary of Discovery Gardens, just southeast of the junction with Al Asayel Street (D72).

== Station layout ==
G	Street level	Exit/Entrance
L1	Mezzanine	Automatic Fare Collection gates, station agent, crossover
L2	Side platform | Doors will open on the right
L2	Platform 1 Northbound	Towards ← Centrepoint; Next Station: The Gardens
L2	Platform 2 Southbound	Towards → Expo 2020; Next Station: Al Furjan
L2	Side platform | Doors will open on the right
