= DMCC =

DMCC may refer to:

- Diplomats and Military Commanders for Change, a former organization
- Dubai Multi Commodities Centre, a commodities exchange and free-trade zone, UAE
  - DMCC (Dubai Metro), UAE

== See also ==
- Digital Markets, Competition and Consumers Act 2024 (DMCC Act, or DMCCA), a UK law
