= Ibn Battuta (Dubai Metro) =

Metro station in the United Arab Emirates

Ibn Battuta ابن بطوطة

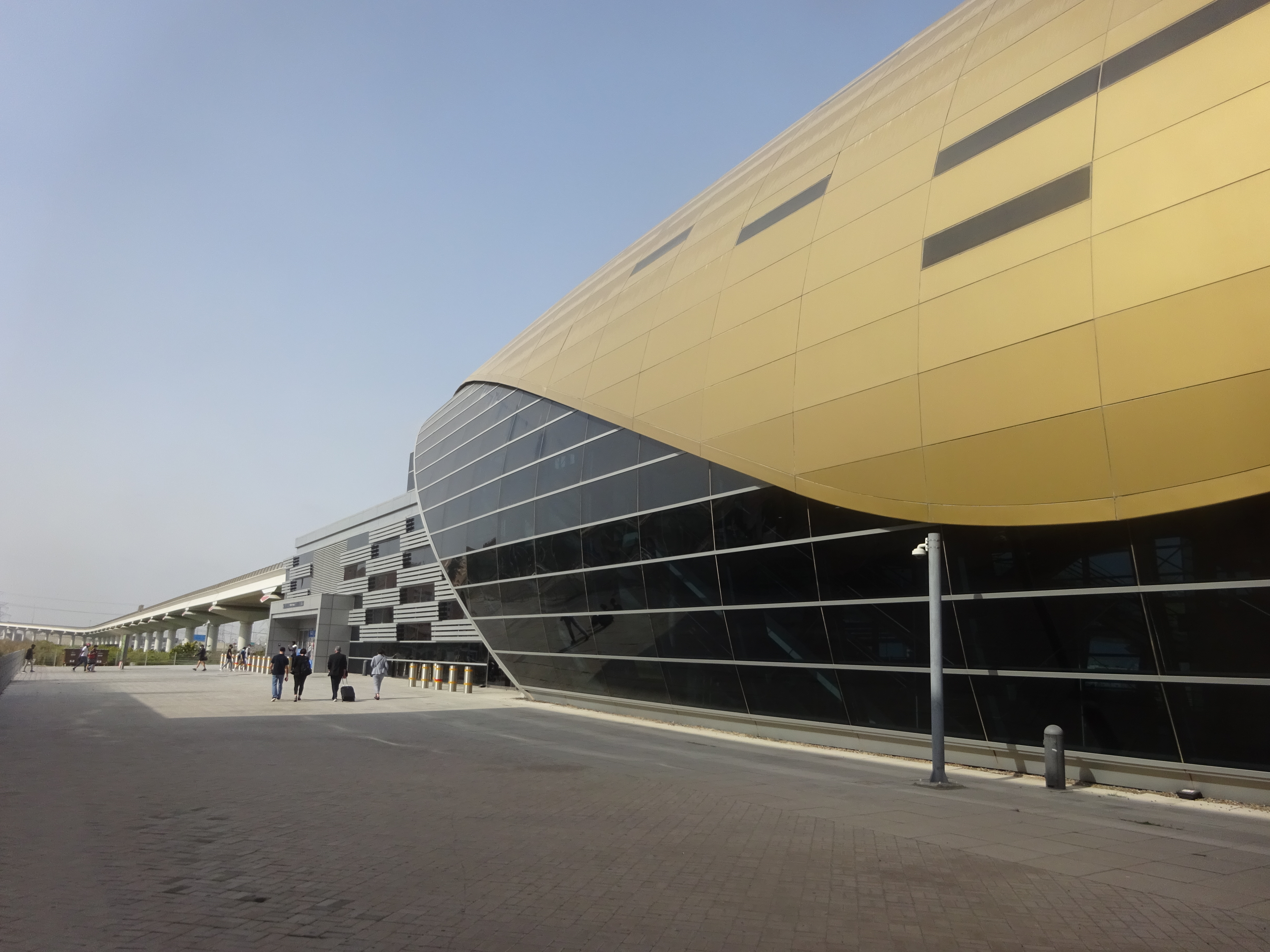
- Ibn Battuta metro station looking south

General information
- Location: Sheikh Zayed Road; Jabal Ali First; Dubai, United Arab Emirates
- Coordinates: 25°02′48.4″N 55°07′03.1″E
- System: Metro Station
- Operator: Dubai Metro
- Line: Red Line
- Platforms: 2
- Tracks: 2
- Connections: RTA Dubai: 8 Al Baraha Bus Stn - Ibn Battuta Bus Stn; DPR1 Ibn Battuta Bus Stn - Dubai Parks and Resorts; F43 Ibn Battuta Bus Stn - Discovery Gardens; F44 Energy MS - Jebel Ali Gardens.; F46 Ibn Battuta Bus Stn - DIP 2; N55 Al Ghubaiba Bus Stn - AMI Airport (PTB); E101 Ibn Battuta Bus Stn - Abu Dhabi CBS, Abu Dhabi; E102 Al Jafiliya Bus Stn - Zayed Intl Airport Terminal A, Abu Dhabi

Other information
- Station code: 39
- Fare zone: 2

History
- Opened: April 30, 2010

Services
Preceding station	Dubai Metro	Following station
Energy towards Life Pharmacy	Red Line Life Pharmacy branch	National Paints towards Centrepoint
Location

Ibn Battuta (Arabic: ابن بطوطة) is a rapid transit station on the Red Line of the Dubai Metro in Dubai, UAE, serving Jebel Ali and surrounding areas. The station is named after the nearby Ibn Battuta Mall.

The station opened as part of the Red Line on 30 April 2010.

Ibn Battuta station is located on the Sheikh Zayed Road between major junctions with the D59 and D591 roads. Nearby are the Ibn Battuta Mall, the Jebel Ali Recreation Club, and the IBN Battuta Bus Station immediately adjacent to the station. Surrounding communities include Jabal Ali 1 and Jabal Ali 2. The station is close to a number of bus routes.

During January 2018 to April 2019, the Red Line between the DMCC and Ibn Battuta stations was closed for an extension to the Dubai Metro system.

== Station layout ==
G	Street level	Exit/Entrance
L1	Mezzanine	Automatic Fare Collection gates, station agent, crossover
L2	Side platform | Doors will open on the right
L2	Platform 2 Southbound	Towards ← Life Pharmacy; Next Station: Energy
L2	Platform 1 Northbound	Towards → Centrepoint; Next Station: National Paints; Passengers heading towards Expo 2020 may alight at the next station
L2	Side platform | Doors will open on the right

== See also ==
- Ibn Battuta (1304–1368/1369), a Muslim Moroccan scholar and explorer
