= Hotpack =

UAE food packaging and distribution company

Hotpack Global
- Industry: Food packaging
- Founded: 1995; 31 years ago
- Founder: Abdul Jebbar PB (Founder); Zainudeen PB (Co-founder)
- Headquarters: Dubai Investment Park 1, Dubai, UAE
- Area served: 106 countries
- Key people: Abdul Jebbar PB (Founder, Group CEO & Managing Director); Zainudeen PB (Cofounder, Group COO & Executive Director); Anvar PB (Group CTO & Executive Director)
- Number of employees: 4,000
- Website: Official website

Hotpack Global is a food packaging and distribution company based in the UAE, founded by Abdul Jebbar and Zainudeen PB in 1995. The company has operations in 29 locations across the Middle East, UK, North America, Malaysia, India, and various African countries. It exports to over 106 countries and is the largest manufacturer of packaging products in the GCC region.

== History ==
Abdul began his career in trading at a young age, procuring foreign goods from individuals arriving from the Gulf. In 1990, he moved to Dubai and worked in various jobs. In 1995, Abdul and his brother Zainudeen PB founded Majid Plastics, which started as a packaging trading company and later became a packaging manufacturer known as Hotpack.

In 2013, the company established its first manufacturing unit at Dubai Investment Park (DIP). The company expanded its operations to the United Kingdom in 2018 with the formation of its subsidiary H-Pack, a global manufacturing facility in Wales. In 2021, Hotpack entered into an agreement with DP World, UAE Region, to export its products through the Jebel Ali Port. In 2022, Hotpack Global announced a AED 350 million investment in Malaysia in collaboration with Free The Seed to build biodegradable packaging plants using rice straw, facilitated by the Malaysian Bioeconomy Development Corporation. The same year, the company opened a $68 million manufacturing and logistics unit in National Industries Park, Dubai. In 2022, the company acquired Al Huraiz Packaging Industry (AHP), a UAE-based carton manufacturer. In 2023, the company announced plans to establish a specialized food packaging project in Saudi Arabia worth an estimated SR1 billion ($266 million). The project aimed to produce environment-friendly products.
