= Dubai Investments Park =

Business park in Dubai

Coordinates: 24.98131°N 55.17598°E

Dubai Investments Park (DIP), including Dubai Investment Park 1 (to the west) and Dubai Investment Park 2 (to the east), is a business park area in Dubai, United Arab Emirates, including commercial, industrial, and residential development. The Green Community Village and Green Community East in DIP 1 are to the north and Dunes Village in DIP 2 is to the northeast. DIP was established in 1995.

Dubai Investments Park covers an area of 2,300 hectares. Greenfield International School, a private international school established in 2007, is located here.

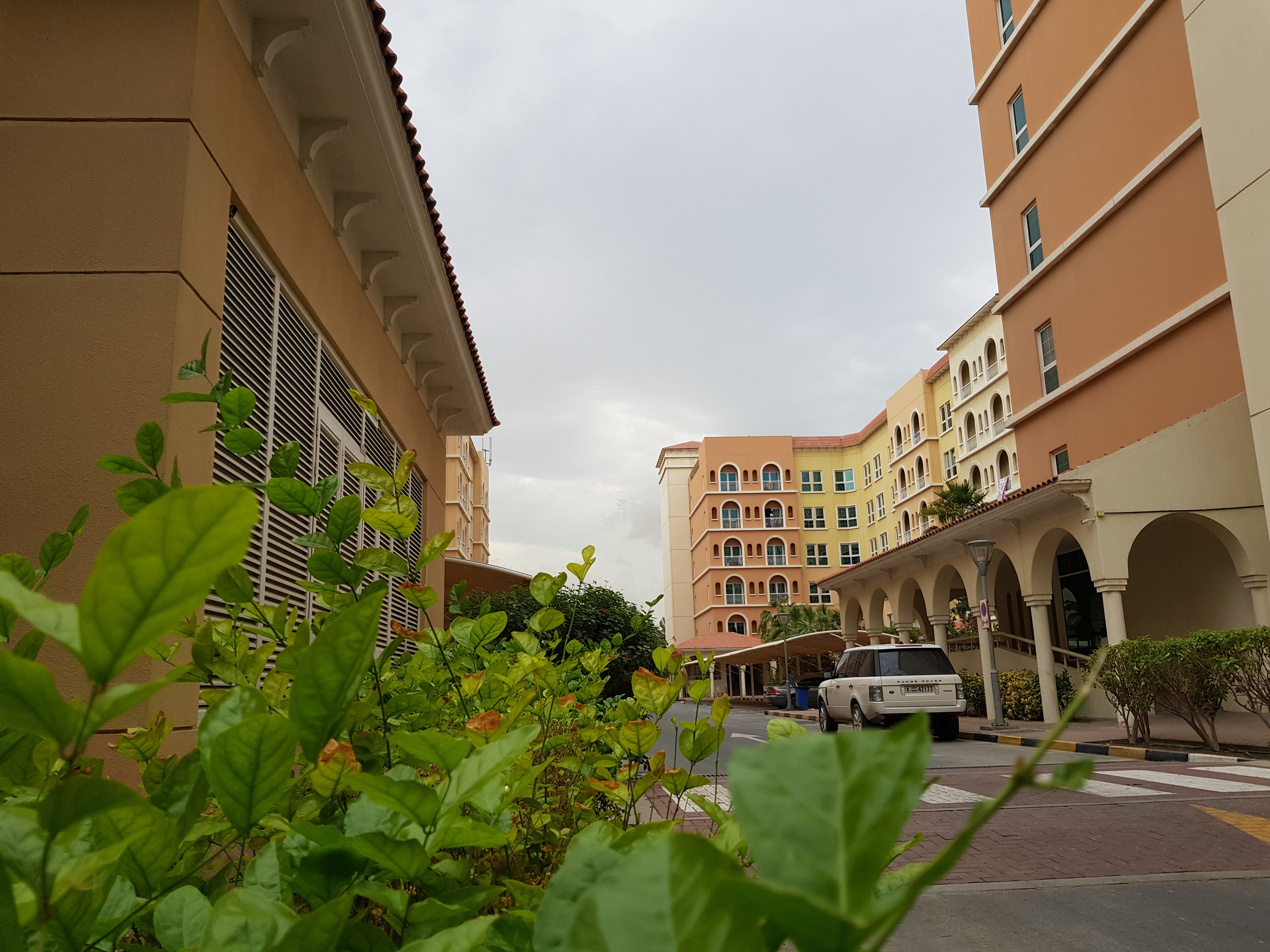
Dubai Investments Park

The Dubai Investment Park metro station in the Green Community Village area of Dubai Investment Park 1 is on the Route 2020 branch line of the Dubai Metro to the Expo 2020 site immediately to the south of Dubai Investment Park, across Expo Road (E77). To the west is the Jebel Ali Industrial Area, across the E311 road, and to the southwest is the Jebel Ali Free Zone Extension.

The development includes the Lagoons, under development by Schön Properties since 2005; Schön's assets were seized by the Dubai Real Estate Regulatory Agency in August 2018 over the company's failure to complete the development.

== See also ==
- List of development projects in Dubai
