= Dubai Investment Park (Dubai Metro) =

Metro station in Dubai, United Arab Emirates

Dubai Investment Park مجمع دبي للاستثمار

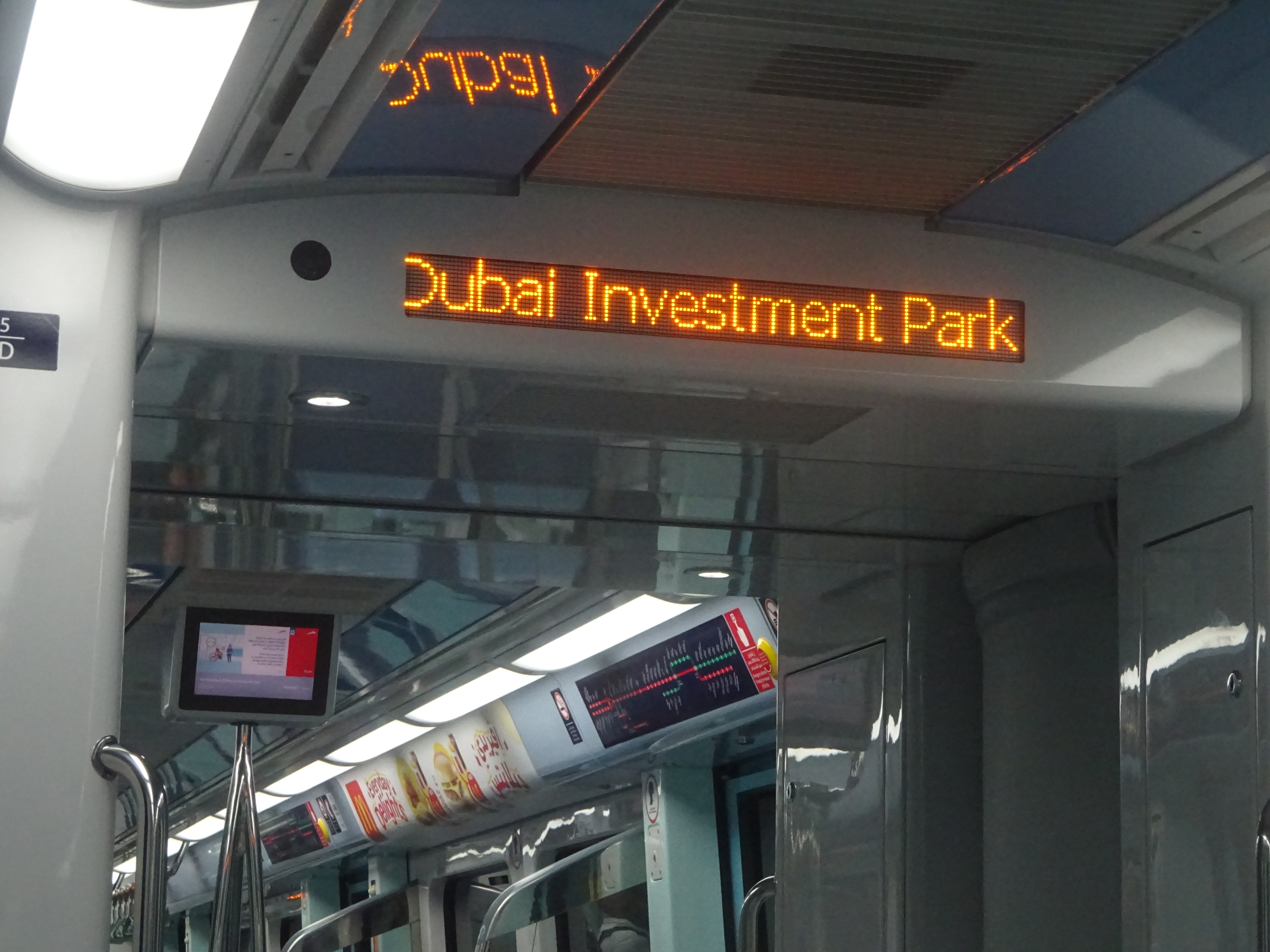
- Dubai Investment Park sign on a metro train

General information
- Location: Green Community; Dubai Investment Park 1 Dubai; United Arab Emirates
- Coordinates: 25.00526°N 55.15566°E
- System: Metro Station
- Operator: Dubai Metro
- Line: Red Line
- Platforms: 2
- Tracks: 2
- Connections: RTA Dubai: F46 Ibn Battuta MS - Dubai Investment Park 2; F47 DIP MS - Danube MS; F48 Danube MS - Dubai Investment Park 2; F51 DIP MS - Dubai Investment Park 1

Construction
- Structure type: Underground
- Parking: Disabled parking spaces

Other information
- Station code: 74
- Fare zone: 1

History
- Opened: 1 June 2021

Services
Preceding station	Dubai Metro	Following station
Expo 2020 Terminus	Red Line Expo 2020 branch	Jumeirah Golf Estates towards Centrepoint
Route map
Location

Dubai Investment Park (Arabic: مجمع دبي للاستثمار) is a rapid transit station on the Expo City Dubai branch of the Red Line of the Dubai Metro in Dubai, UAE, serving Dubai Investment Park.

The metro station opened on 1 June 2021 at the same time as the Expo 2020 station as part of Route 2020, created to link central Dubai to the Expo 2020 exhibition site. The schedule was delayed due to the COVID-19 pandemic in the United Arab Emirates.

The station is one of two underground stations on the Route 2020 section of the Red Line, along with Jumeirah Golf Estates. It is located at the Green Community in Dubai Investment Park. Facilities include bus stops, disabled parking, retail units, and a taxi drop-off zone. Beyond this station, the metro line goes elevated again.

== Station layout ==
G	Street level	Exit/Entrance
L1	Mezzanine	Automatic Fare Collection gates, station agent, crossover
L2	Side platform | Doors will open on the right
L2	Platform 1 Northbound	Towards ← Centrepoint; Next Station: Jumeirah Golf Estates
L2	Platform 2 Southbound	Towards → Expo 2020
L2	Side platform | Doors will open on the right
