= Novo Cinemas =

Movie theatre chain

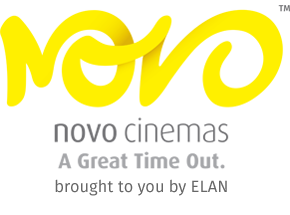
- Formerly: Grand Cinemas
- Company type: Private company
- Founded: 15 May 2000; 26 years ago
- Number of locations: 15
- Area served: Qatar; UAE
- Key people: Jaber Al Ansari, Group CEO, ELAN Group
- Owner: ELAN Group
- Website: novocinemas.com

Novo Cinemas is a movie theatre chain owned by ELAN Group operating in Qatar and United Arab Emirates. It is headquartered in Doha and considered one of the larger cinema chains in the Middle East.

It was previously known as Grand Cinemas since 2000 until it relaunched on 6 May 2014 under the Novo Cinemas name, with theatres located in Qatar, Dubai, Abu Dhabi, Sharjah and Ras Al Khaimah.

Debbie Stanford-Kristiansen, CEO of Novo Cinemas, has been crowned ‘Female CEO of the Year’ at a prestigious industry award for her outstanding contribution to the regional film industry.

Despite the 2014 rebrand, the Grand Cinemas brand itself continues to exist as a separate corporate entity based in Lebanon, owned by Selim Ramia & Co., one of the co-founders and former executives of Gulf Film LLC.

== History ==
The Grand Cinemas brand name was launched in Dubai, United Arab Emirates, in 2000.

In July 2005, Grand Cinemas launched the first IMAX in the Middle East at Ibn Battuta Mall Megaplex in Dubai; which eventually closed on 31 July 2024.

In July 2007, the Grand Cinemas franchise expands into Lebanon under the ownership of local businessman Selim Ramia, one of the co-founders of the Gulf Film LLC Group. The company continues presently as an independent entity despite the 2014 rebrand in the U.A.E.

It was relaunched on 6 May 2014 as Novo Cinemas. In 2024, Novo Cinemas ceased operation in several malls in Dubai, including Ibn Battuta Mall.

Novo Cinemas ceased operations in Oman following the closing of its Mall of Muscat unit on 3 August 2025.
