= The Winchester School =

School in Dubai, UAE

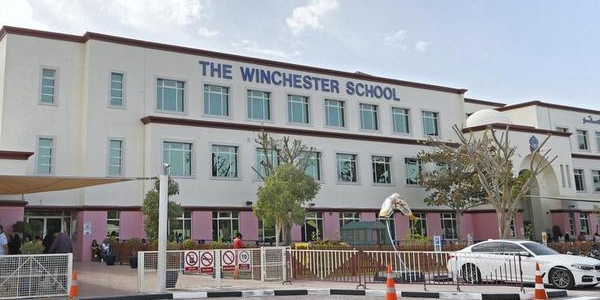

Location
- Jebel Ali; Dubai, Jebel Ali, 299331; United Arab Emirates; 25.04019°N 55.12037°E

Information
- Type: Independent school
- Motto: Lead Kindly Light
- Established: September 2003
- Local authority: KHDA
- Principal: Meenakshi Dahiya
- Staff: 200+
- Gender: Co-educational
- Age: 3–4 to 18
- Enrolment: 4300+
- Houses: Fire, Wind, Water, Earth
- Website: www.thewinchesterschool.com

The Winchester School (Arabic: مدرسة وينشستر) is a British private school situated in the Jebel Ali area of Dubai in the United Arab Emirates. The school serves expatriate families, and its students include large numbers of South Asian and Arab nationals along with many other nationalities.

The Winchester School is a registered international school from FS-1 (age 3–4) to Year 13 (age 18) As of September 2026, the school had about 4,300 students, positioning itself as one of the largest student bodies among British-curriculum schools in Dubai. It was founded in 2003. The school is part of GEMS, an international school business.

The school is located on the southwest edge of The Gardens neighbourhood and close to Jebel Ali Village. It is close to the Dubai branch of the Delhi Private School.

In 2019, a teacher at the school, Shalini Rajan, was BTEC Teacher of the Year, quoted to be "empowering her students by embracing modern teaching and learning strategies".

The school is regularly mentioned in national UAE newspapers. For example, in 2016, the school was reported by Gulf News to be the best UAE school for girls' cricket. In 2019, it was reported that the Winchester School raised over Dh130,000 to support education programmes for children in Malawi. The GCSE results in 2020 were reported as being 72% at grades 5–9, with one pupil achieving nine A* results (grades 8–9).

The school's facilities are widespread, such as multiple sporting fields, an auditorium, BTEC, Physics, Biology and Science labs as well as enhanced education centres.
