= Ibn Battuta Mall =

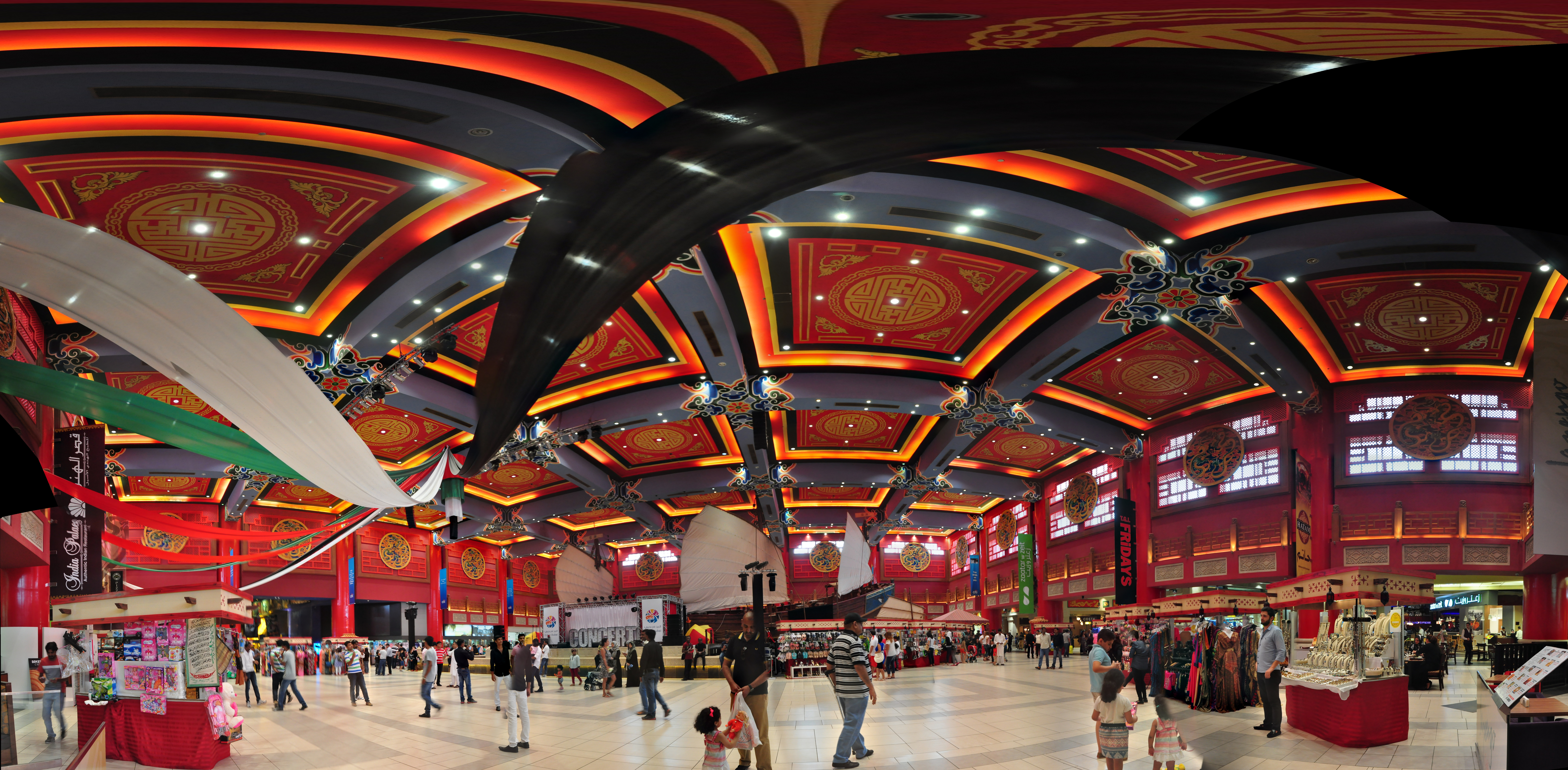
- China Court
- Location: Dubai, United Arab Emirates
- Coordinates: 25°02′40″N 55°07′14″E
- Opened: 4 April 2005; 21 years ago
- Manager: Nakheel Properties
- Owner: Nakheel Properties
- Website: ibnbattutamall.com

The Ibn Battuta Mall is a shopping mall on the Sheikh Zayed Road in Dubai, UAE, close to Interchange 6 for Jabal Ali 1 in southwest Dubai. opened in 2005, it contains more than 300 stores. It is named after Ibn Battuta, the 14th-century Maghrebi traveller, explorer and scholar. The mall consists of 6 courts which are China, India, Persia, Egypt, Tunisia, and Andalusia.

== Overview ==
Having around 275 shops, 50 restaurants, and over 4,500 parking spaces totaling 521,000 m^{2} (5,610,000 sq ft) of space, Ibn Battuta is the world's largest themed shopping mall. The mall features shops from many retailers, generally ranging from affordable to mid-range brands. Boutiques in the mall belong to many categories, including women's fashion, men's fashion, and children's fashion, as well as jewelry and other accessories. Some of the major international brands present in the mall include Tommy Hilfiger, Forever 21, Levi's, and American Eagle Outfitters. The mall also contains pharmacies and dining options. On 26 May 2013, Nakheel announced the tender for Ibn Battuta Mall expansion – a new, 28,000 m^{2} (300,000 sq ft) retail hub for another 150 shops. This expansion introduced new shops in the mall, such as Decathlon, Brands for Less, and includes a new food court in the upgraded metro link. The mall contains several activities such as a trampoline park, a light exhibition, the Carrefour hypermarket and a 21-screen cinema theatre by Novo cinemas until its closure in 2024.

The mall consists of six courts, each of whose designs are inspired by some of the countries visited by the Moroccan Berber explorer, Ibn Battuta: Andalusia Court, China Court, Egypt Court, India Court, Persia Court, and Tunisia Court. The India Court features a working reproduction of an elephant clock.

The mall is located next to the neighbourhood of The Gardens, and near the Delhi Private School and the Winchester School. The eponymous Ibn Battuta metro station on the Dubai Metro provides access from central Dubai.

In recent years, Ibn Battuta Mall has open new shops and businesses including a brand-new nursery concept by Jumeirah International Nurseries and a new walk-in-retail store for Eros Group.

The mall is directly connected to three hotels, the Premier Inn Dubai Ibn Battuta Hotel, Avani Ibn Battuta Dubai Hotel and Ibn Battuta Gate. The former opened in 2016 with 389 rooms and was extensively renovated in 2021, which increased its capacity to 594 rooms, making it the largest Premier Inn in the Middle East. The latter opened in 2019 and has 360 rooms. Ibn Battuta Gate is currently undergoing a rebrand, with its famous pink facade being painted white.

In 2025, Nakheel, the company operating the mall, had merged into Dubai Holding and the mall's management was taken over by Dubai Retail. As a result, the mall debuted a new website and branding and some brands were told to stop operating at the mall. Novo Cinemas in the mall had closed and was replaced by Roxy Cinemas. 38 New brands will open in Ibn Battuta Mall, with 21 already open and 17 more opening in 2027.

== Gallery ==
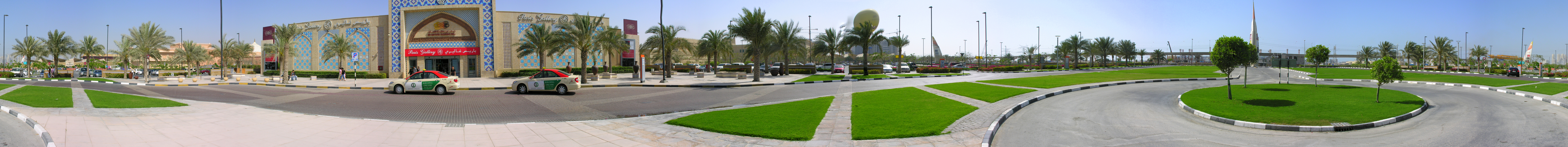
Panoramic View outside Persia Court Entrance

The Egypt Court at the Ibn Battuta Mall, on opening day

Debenhams store, located in the Persia Court

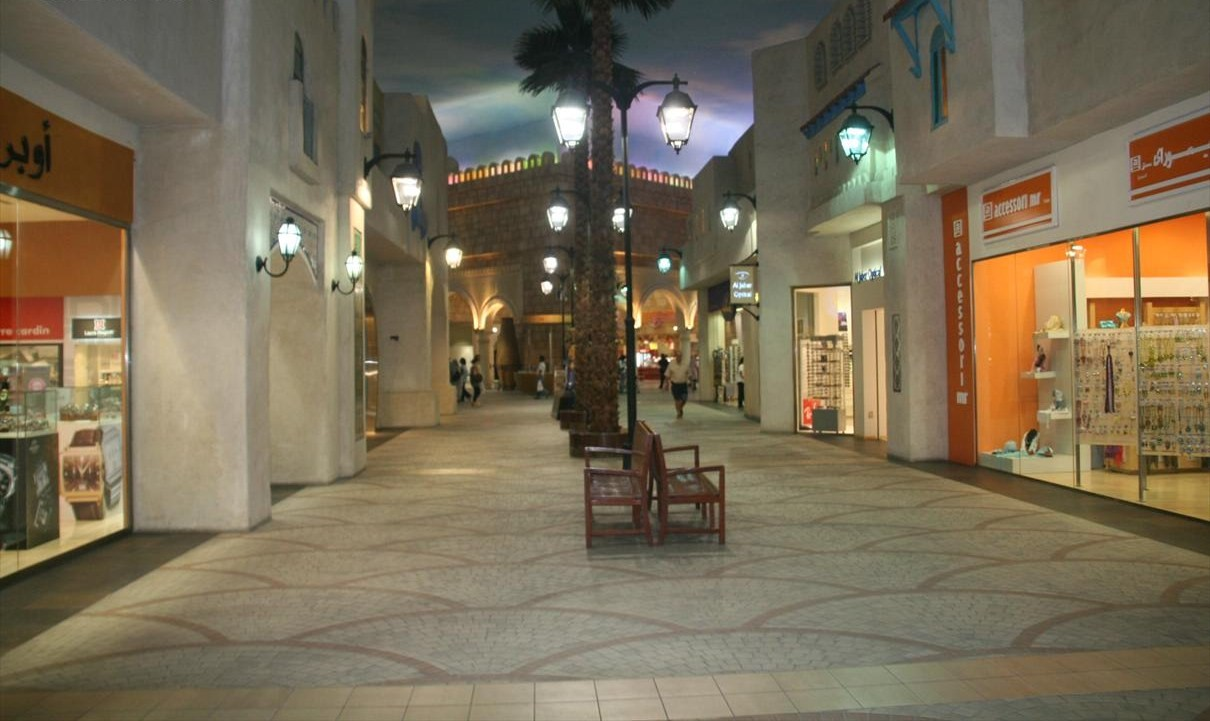
Tunisia Court

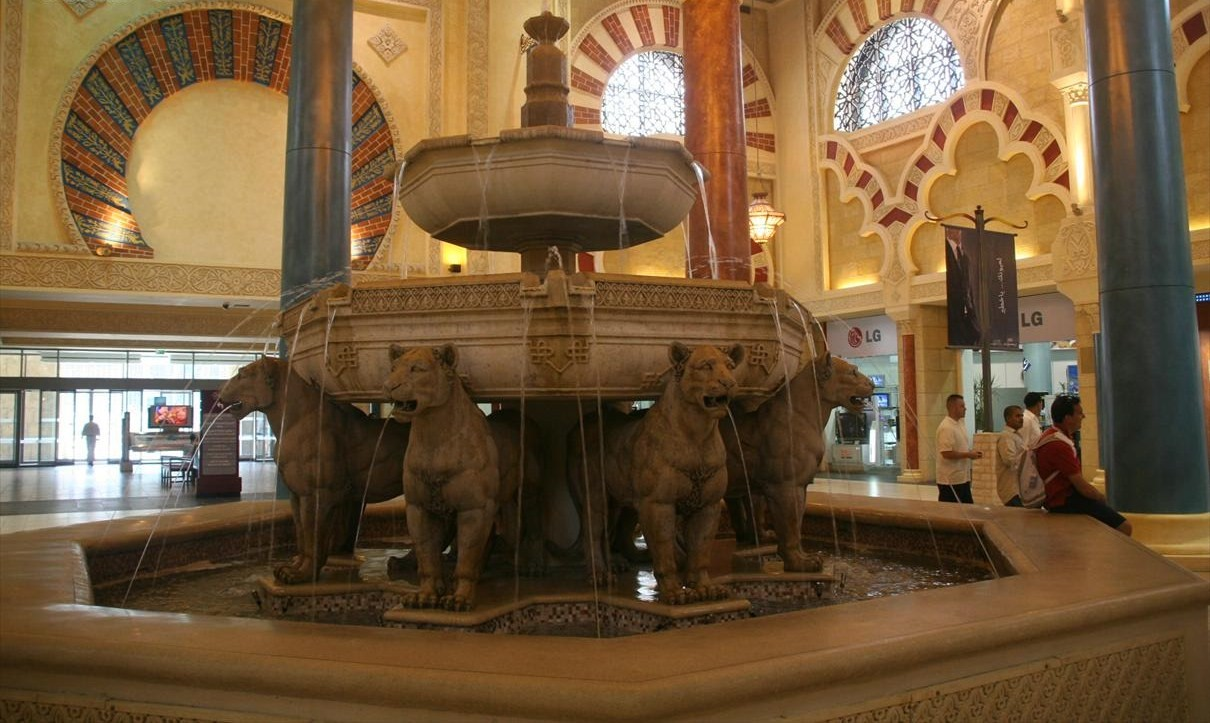
Fountain in Andalusia Court

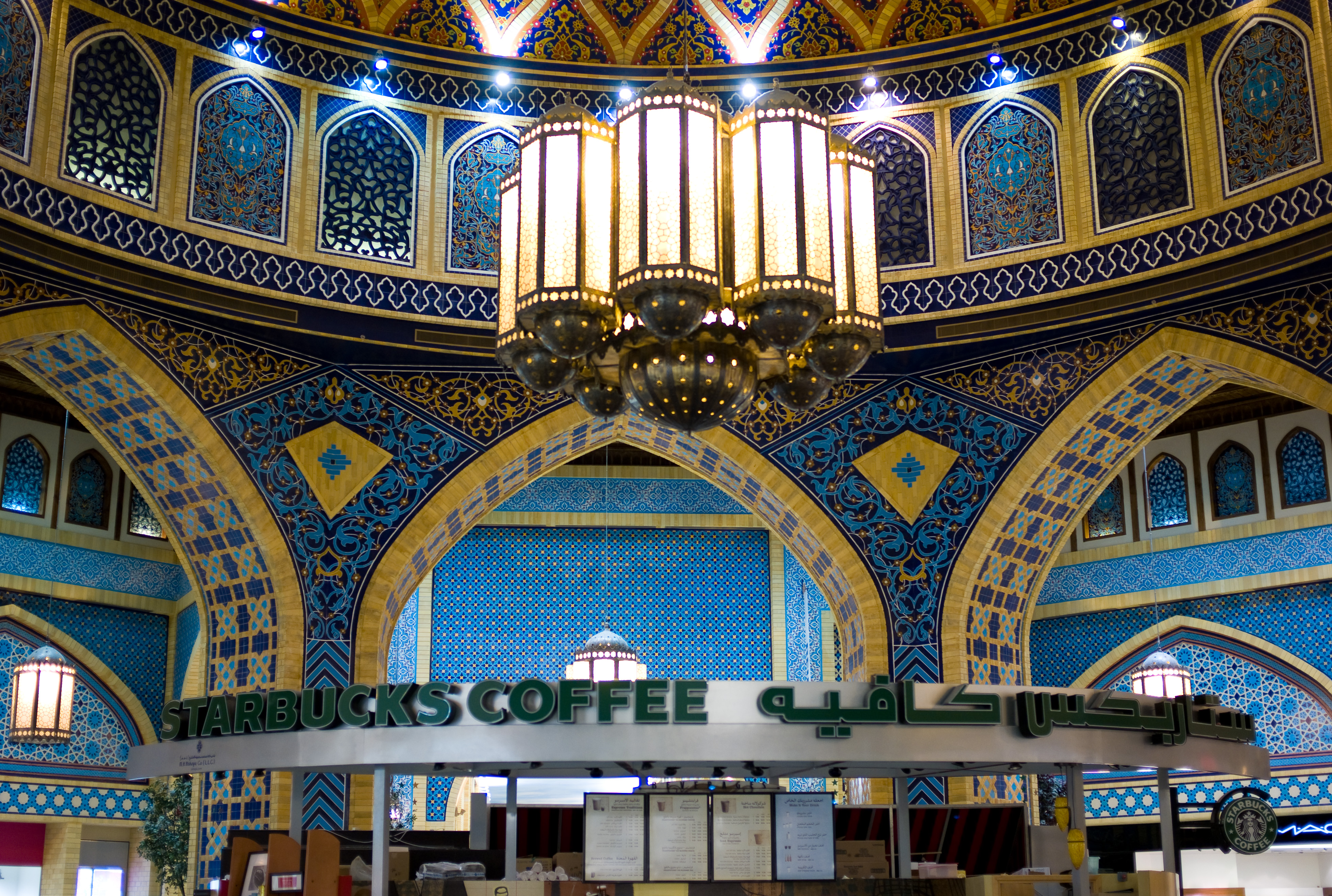
Starbucks in Persia Court

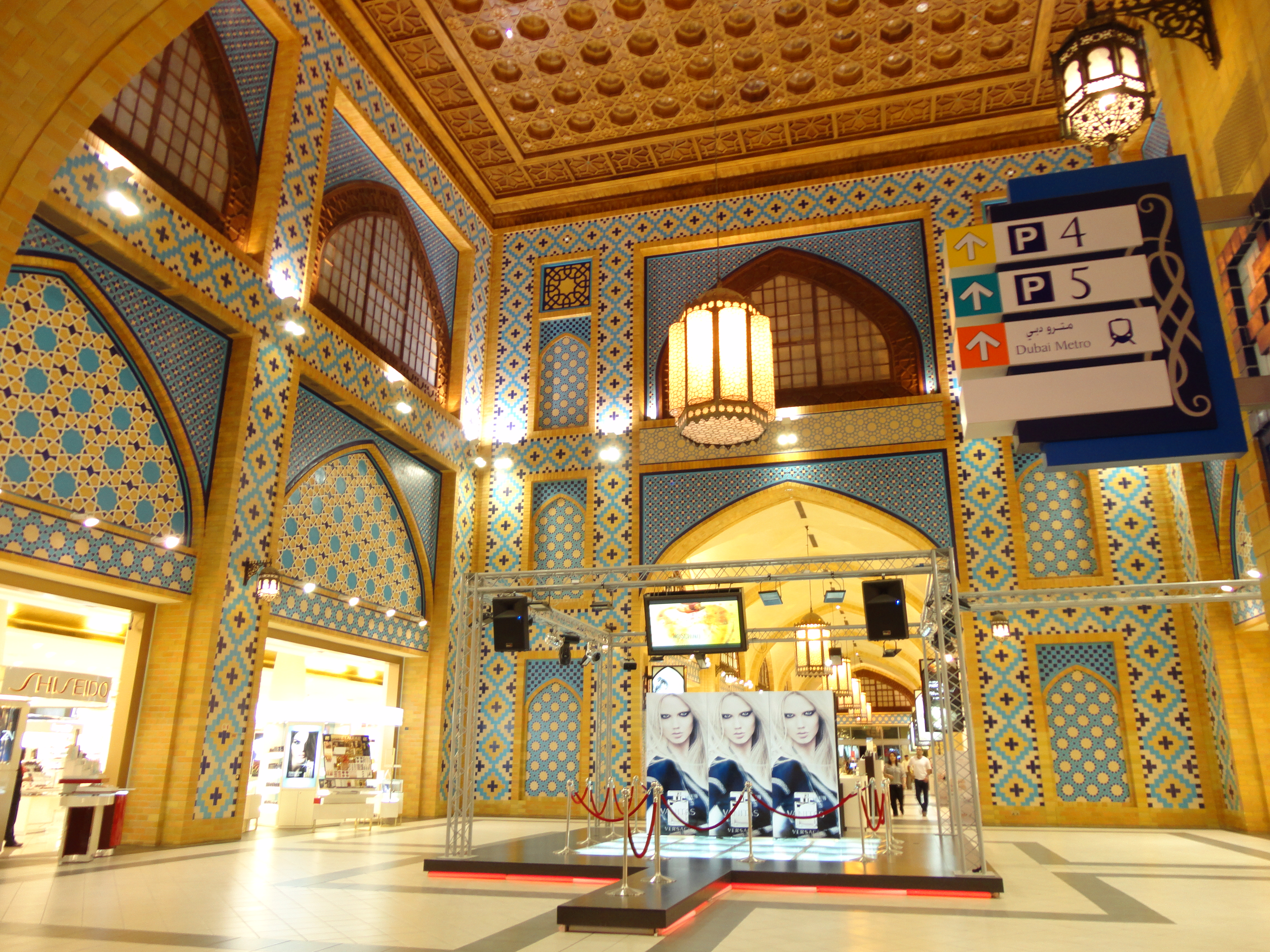
Persia Court

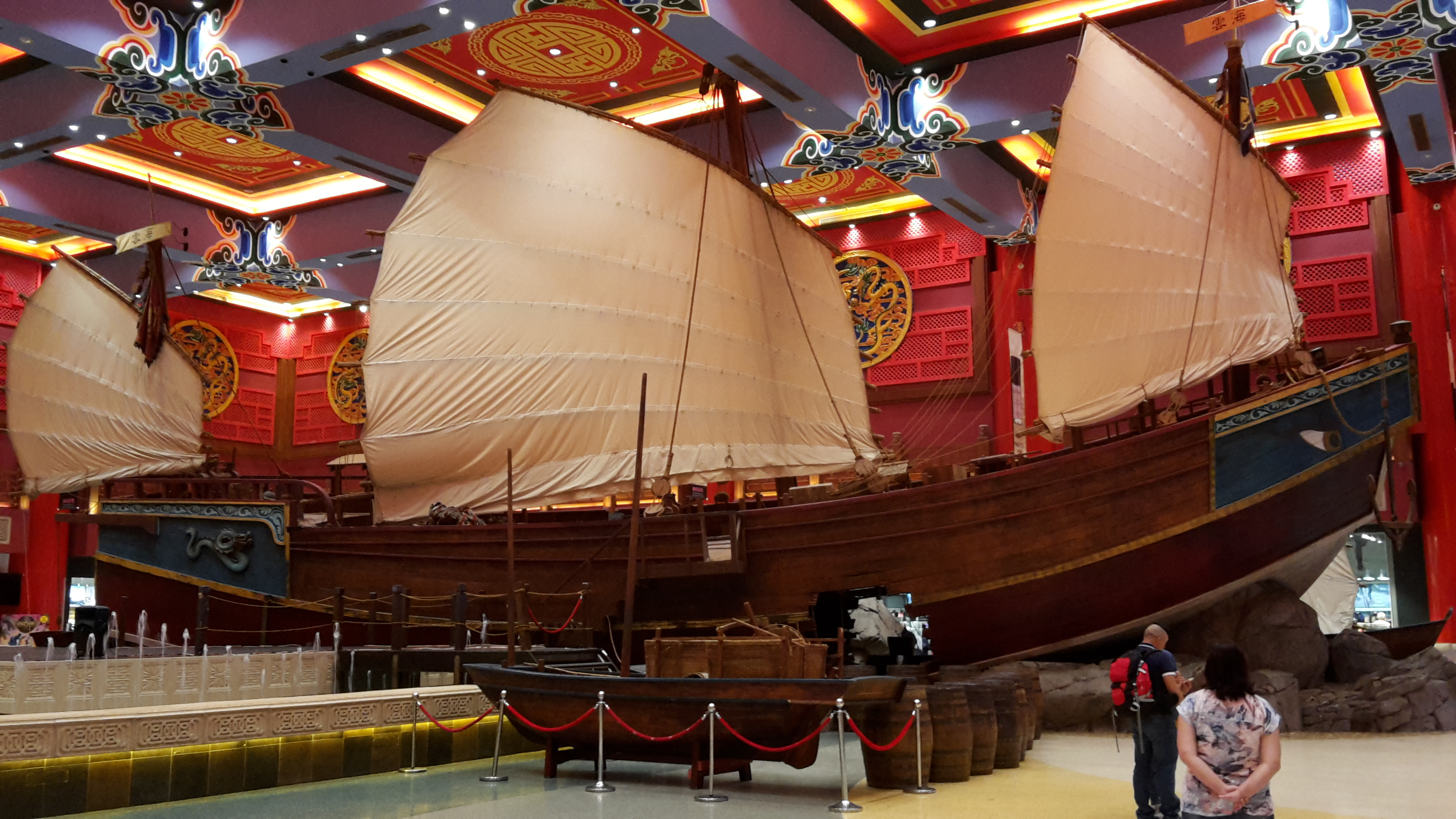
China Court with a replica of a smaller junk in Zheng He's fleet

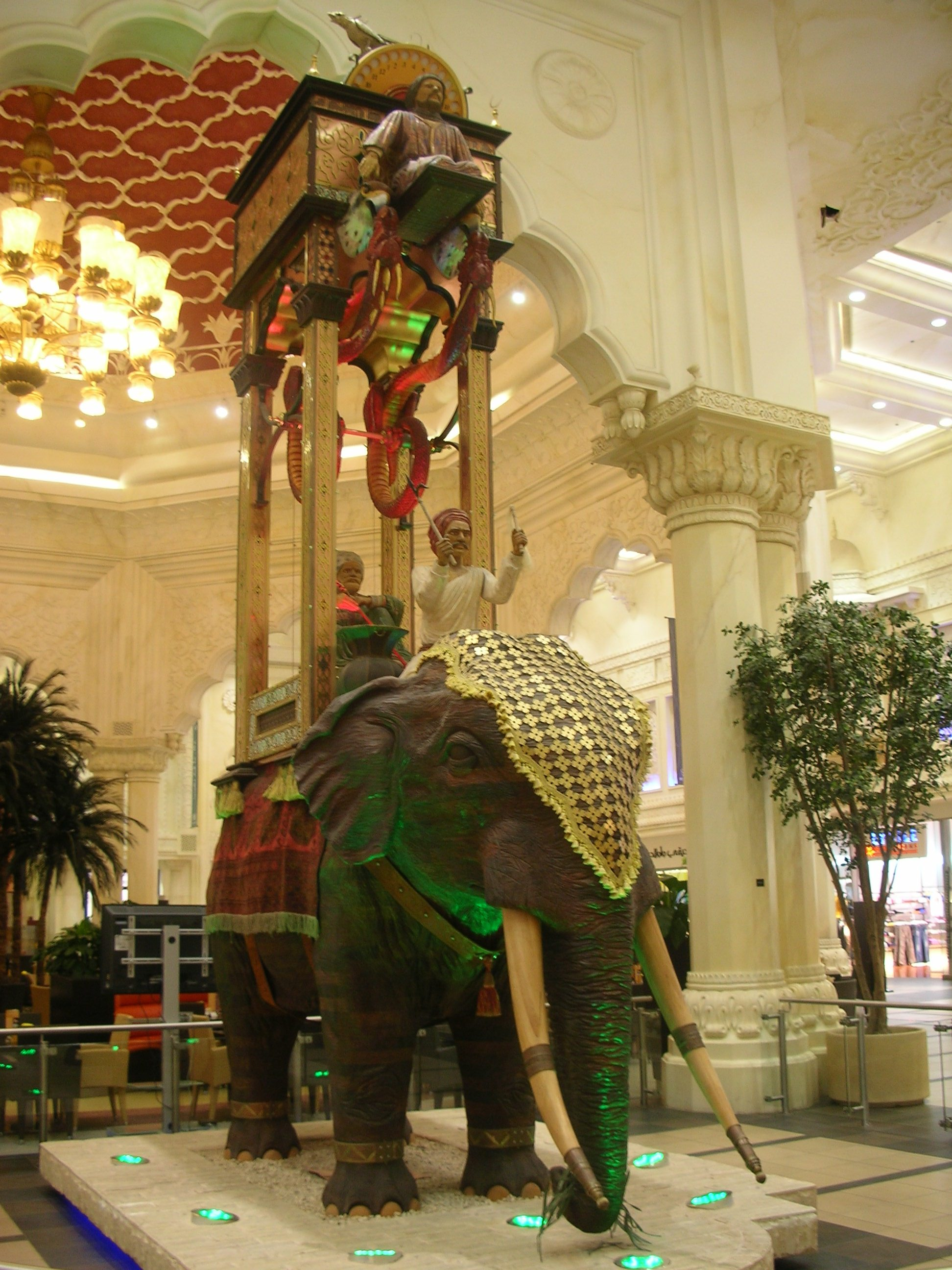
India Court with a working reproduction of the elephant clock

== See also ==
- Ibn Battuta (1304–1368/9), a Muslim Moroccan scholar and explorer
- Ibn Battuta (Dubai Metro) station
