= Life Pharmacy (Dubai Metro) =

Metro station in Dubai, United Arab Emirates

Life Pharmacy صيدلية لايف

General information
- Location: Jabal Ali Industrial Second, Dubai; United Arab Emirates
- Coordinates: 24.9776°N 55.0911°E
- Line: Red Line
- Platforms: 2 side platforms
- Tracks: 2
- Connections: RTA Dubai: 95A Parco Hypermarket - Jebel Ali Waterfront Labour Camp; 99 Jebel Ali Stn - Life Pharmacy Stn; F54 Danube MS - JAFZA South

Construction
- Accessible: yes

History
- Opened: March 2011; 15 years ago
- Former names: Jebel Ali, UAE Exchange

Services
Preceding station	Dubai Metro	Following station
Terminus	Red Line Life Pharmacy branch	Danube towards Centrepoint
Location

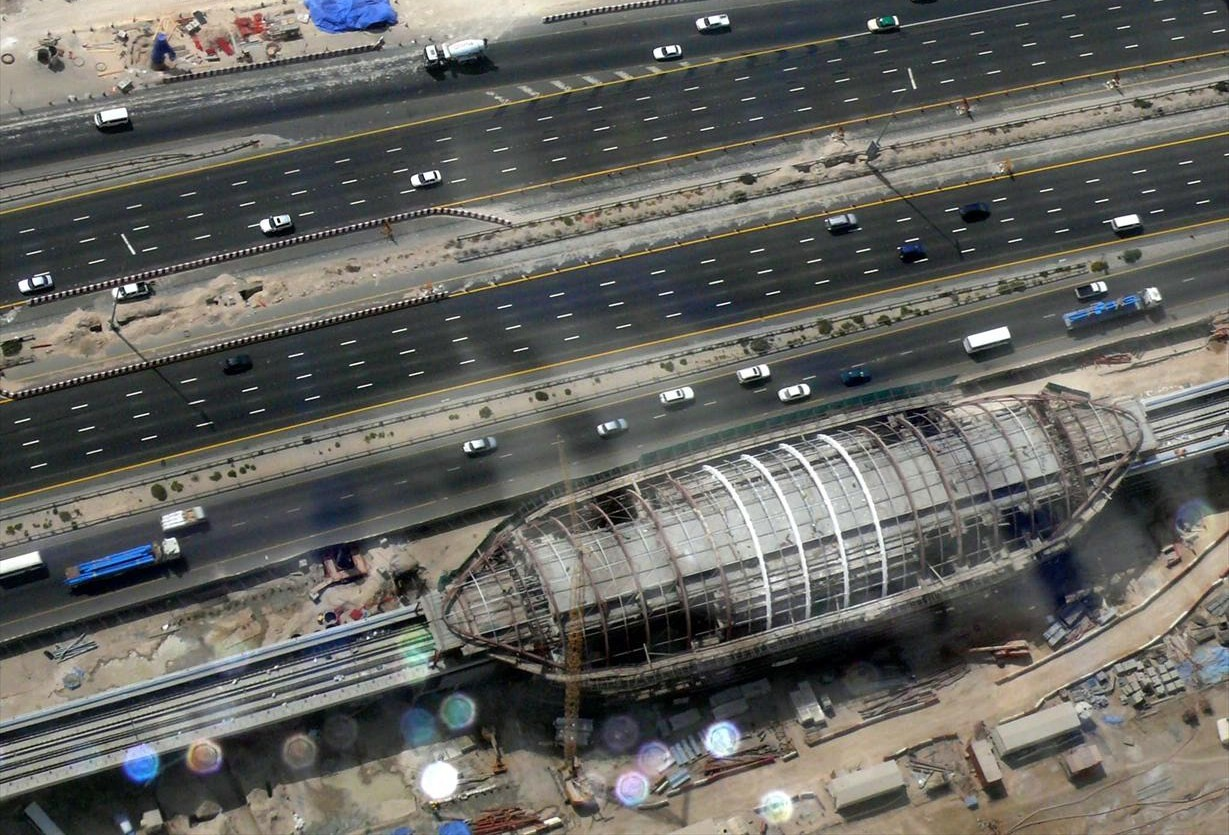

Life Pharmacy (Arabic: صيدلية لايف; formerly Jebel Ali and UAE Exchange) is a rapid transit station and the southwestern terminus on the Red Line of the Dubai Metro in Dubai, United Arab Emirates.

== History ==
The station was inaugurated in March 2011 and was expected to handle over 4,000 passengers daily. It was the last stop on the Red Line until May 31, 2021, and has a total handling capacity of 11,000 passengers per direction. It is the only metro station that is built on the ground, and is not elevated or underground.

The station was previously called Jebel Ali, before it was renamed on June 30, 2015, to UAE Exchange following an agreement between Dubai's Roads and Transport Authority (RTA) and UAE Exchange. The naming agreement was inked as part of RTA's rebranding strategy.

The station is located next to another auxiliary depot used by the Dubai Metro. This is the second depot in Dubai Metro apart from the major depot at Rashidiya located near the Centrepoint Station, the last station on the other side of the Red Line and another depot located near the Etisalat metro station at the northern terminus of the Green Line.

As of May 2025, the station has been officially renamed to Life Pharmacy as part of a digital branding initiative by the RTA. The new name appears in the Shail app, and has since been implemented in station announcements and signage on May 22, 2025.

== Location ==
The station is located in Jabal Ali Industrial 2, and mainly serves employees working and living in the industrial zone of Jebel Ali Free Zone Authority (JAFZA) in Mena Jabal Ali.

== Station layout ==
G	Street level	Exit/Entrance
L1	Mezzanine	Automatic Fare Collection gates, station agent, crossover
L2	Side platform | Doors will open on the right
L2	Platform 2 Southbound	Towards ← Train Terminates Here
L2	Platform 1 Northbound	Towards → National Paints / Centrepoint; Next Station: Danube
L2	Side platform | Doors will open on the right
