= Red Line (Dubai Metro) =

Rapid transit line in UAE

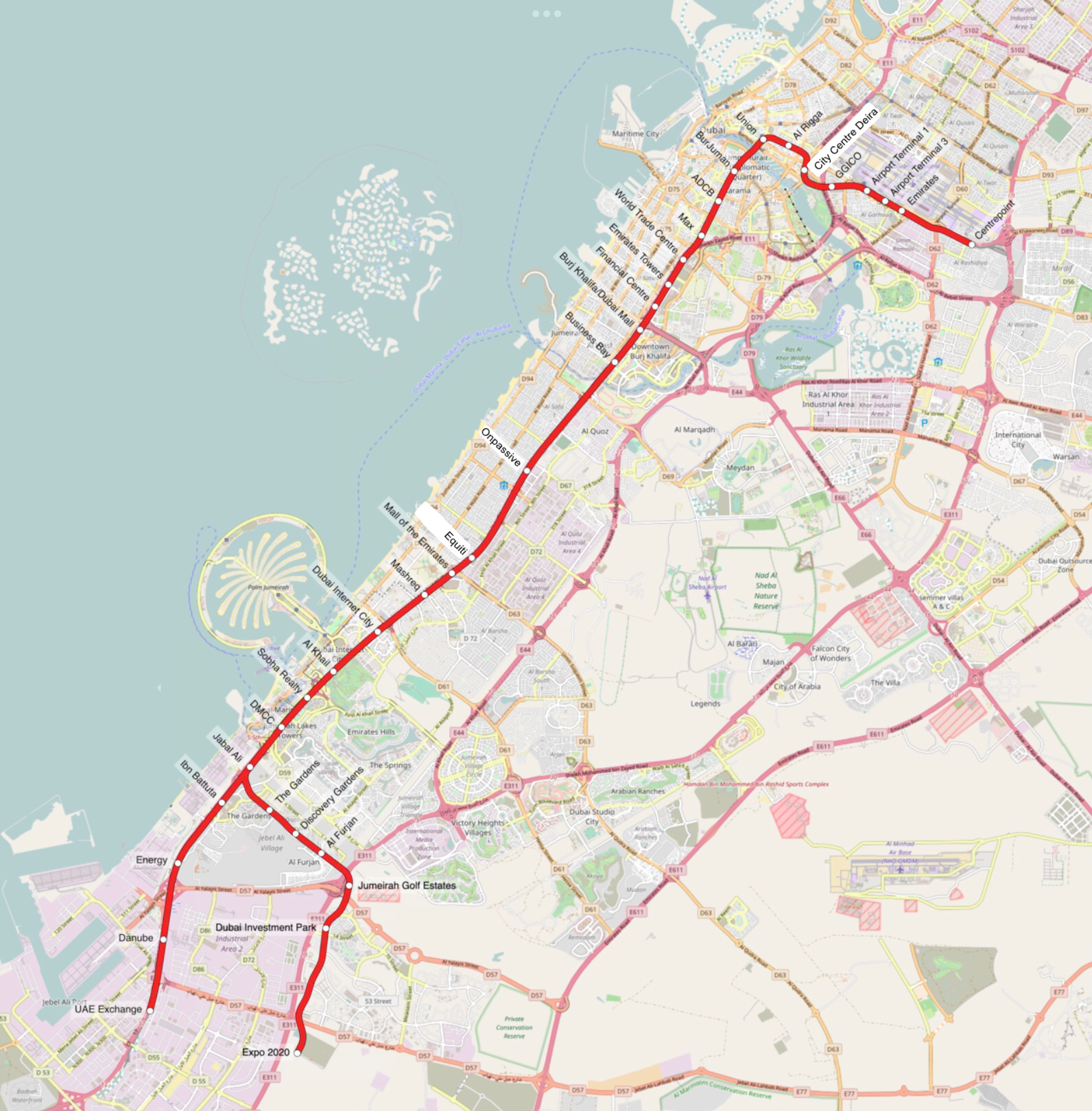
- Map of the Red Line

Overview
- Status: Complete
- Owner: Roads and Transport Authority (Dubai)
- Locale: Dubai, United Arab Emirates
- Termini: Centrepoint; Expo 2020, Life Pharmacy
- Stations: 35

Service
- Type: Rapid transit
- System: Dubai Metro
- Operator: Keolis-MHI

History
- Opened: 9 September 2009; 17 years ago (limited)
- Last extension: 2021

Technical
- Line length: 67 kilometers (42 mi)
- Num of tracks: 2
- Track gauge: 4 ft 8 1/2 in (1,435 mm)
- Electrification: Third rail
- Operating speed: 95 km/h (59 mph)

The Red Line is currently one of two lines of the Dubai Metro network in Dubai, United Arab Emirates. It runs from Centrepoint (formerly Rashidiya) in the east to Expo 2020 in the west and travels parallel to Sheikh Zayed Road for most of its length.

There are two interchange stations with the Green Line: Union and BurJuman. Additionally, Jabal Ali is an interchange between the main Red Line (Route 2020) to Expo 2020 and the branch line to Life Pharmacy. The Red Line has its main depot near Centrepoint and an auxiliary depot at Life Pharmacy.

Additionally, DMCC and Sobha Realty have connections to the Dubai Tram at Jumeirah Lake Towers and Dubai Marina stations, respectively.

== History ==
The first section was inaugurated on 9 September 2009 with ten stations opened. Construction was declared complete on 28 April 2010, with an additional sixteen stations opened during 2010.

In 2010, the Red Line carried a total of 38.888 million passengers with a daily average of about 149,000 people, according to the RTA Statistics Office. In 2013, the Red Line handled a total of over 88 million passengers and the daily average was about 243,000 people.

Three additional stations were added between 2011 and 2013, making a total of twenty-nine stations spanning 52.1 km (32.4 mi). The line is the world's longest single rapid transit line to use driverless trains, as recognized by Guinness World Records in 2011.

=== Route 2020 extension ===
As part of the Expo 2020 development in Dubai, an extension of the Red Line named Route 2020 was announced in December 2015 and originally due to be completed mid-2019. The extension project created a new section of the line from Jabal Ali to the Expo 2020 site, near Al Maktoum International Airport.

Construction of the Route 2020 line started in 2016 by the ExpoLink Consortium, comprising Alstom, Acciona, and Gülermak. The track layout east of Jabal Ali station was modified to create a new branch and two additional platforms to serve the new route. The line was formally inaugurated by Sheikh Mohammed Bin Rashid Al Maktoum, Dubai's Ruler and UAE Prime Minister, on 8 July 2020. As a result of increasing popularity of the metro, the new stations feature platforms wider than those found in existing stations, to cope with greater ridership. The extension is 15 km (9.3 mi) in length, with 11.8 km (7.3 mi) above ground and 3.2 km (2.0 mi) below ground. Of the seven stations, five are elevated and two are underground. Eventually it is planned to extend the line beyond Expo 2020 to Al Maktoum International Airport, south of the Expo site. The route is expected to have 275,000 users each day by 2030.

The extension was partially opened on 1 January 2021, with trains running a shuttle service between Jabal Ali and Al Furjan. The section from Al Furjan to Expo 2020 was opened on 1 June 2021, allowing the extension to be fully operational, as well as the transfer of the main Red Line route from Life Pharmacy to Expo 2020.

The travel time between Centrepoint and Expo 2020 station is reported to be 1 hour 14 minutes with a service frequency of 2 minutes and 38 seconds during peak times (24 trains per hour in each direction), and a capacity of 16,000 passengers per hour in each direction.

The section from Jabal Ali to Life Pharmacy initially ran as a shuttle service, with passengers from Centrepoint needing to change at Jabal Ali Metro Station for stations to Life Pharmacy. From 15 April 2024, trains from Centrepoint began operating directly to Life Pharmacy, removing the need to change trains at Jabal Ali.

The directions depend on the timing of the Y junction where the Expo 2020 and Life Pharmacy branches meet in front of Jabal Ali Metro Station.

== Route ==
Route of Red line

As of 2021, the Red Line had 31 stations on the main line and an additional 4 stations on the branch. The line is 52.1 km (32.4 mi) long, with 4.7 km (2.9 mi) underground.

170 feeder buses, which are provided by the RTA for commuters to commute to stations on the line, are also in operation, as of 15 October 2010.

Red Line
Branch		Station Code	Station name		Date opened	Connections	Station Type	Platform Type
Main	Branch	Station Code	English	Arabic	Date opened	Connections	Station Type	Platform Type
●		11	Centrepoint	سنتربوينت	9 September 2009	M4; Centrepoint Metro Bus Station (Al Rashidiya Bus Station)	Elevated	Island and Side
●		12	Emirates	طيران الإمارات	30 April 2010	Emirates Headquarters	Elevated	Side
●		13	Airport Terminal 3	المطار- مبنى رقم 3	9 September 2009	Dubai International Airport Terminal 3	Elevated	Island
●		14	Airport Terminal 1	المطار- مبنى رقم 1	30 April 2010	Dubai International Airport Terminal 1	Elevated	Side
●		15	Al Garhoud	القرهود	15 May 2010		Elevated	Side
●		16	City Centre Deira	سيتي سنتر ديرة	9 September 2009		Underground	Side
●		17	Al Rigga	الرقة	9 September 2009		Underground	Side
●		18	Union	الاتحاد	9 September 2009	M2	Underground	Island and Side
●		19	BurJuman	برجمان	9 September 2009	M2	Underground	Side
●		20	ADCB	بنك أبوظبي التجاري	30 April 2010		Elevated	Side
●		21	Max	ماكس	9 September 2009		Elevated	Side
●		22	World Trade Centre	المركز التجاري العالمي	15 May 2010		Elevated	Side
●		23	Emirates Towers	أبراج الإمارات	30 April 2010	Museum of the Future	Elevated	Side
●		24	Financial Centre	مركز دبي المالي العالمي	9 September 2009	Gate Avenue at DIFC (Dubai International Financial Centre)	Elevated	Side
●		25	Burj Khalifa/Dubai Mall	دبي مول / برج خليفة	4 January 2010	Dubai Mall	Elevated	Side
●		26	Business Bay	الخليج التجاري	15 October 2010		Elevated	Side
●		29	Garmin	غارمن	15 May 2010		Elevated	Side
●		31	Equiti	اكويتي	15 October 2010		Elevated	Side
●		32	Mall of the Emirates	مول الإمارات	9 September 2009	Mall of the Emirates	Elevated	Side
●		33	Insurance Market	سوق التأمين	15 October 2010		Elevated	Side
●		34	Dubai Internet City	مدينة دبي للانترنت	30 April 2010	The One Tower	Elevated	Side
●		35	Al Fardan Exchange	الفردان للصرافة	15 October 2010	Arenco Tower (AAM Tower)	Elevated	Island
●		36	Sobha Realty	شوبا العقارية	30 April 2010	Interchange with Dubai Tram.	Elevated	Side
●		37	DMCC	أبراج بحيرات جميرا	15 October 2010	Interchange with Dubai Tram.	Elevated	Side
●	●	38	National Paints	دهانات ناشونال	9 September 2009	Interchange with Red Line fork from Jabal Ali to Life Pharmacy	Elevated	Island and Side
	●	39	Ibn Battuta	ابن بطوطة	30 April 2010	Ibn Battuta Mall and Ibn Battuta Bus Station	Elevated	Side
	●	40	Energy	الطاقة	30 September 2013		Elevated	Side
	●	41	Danube	دانوب	12 December 2012		Elevated	Side
	●	42	Life Pharmacy	صيدلية لايف	11 March 2011		At Grade	Side
●		70	The Gardens	الحدائق	1 January 2021		Elevated	Side
●		71	Discovery Gardens	ديسكفري جاردنز	1 January 2021		Elevated	Side
●		72	Al Furjan	الفرجان	1 January 2021		Elevated	Side
●		73	Jumeirah Golf Estates	عقارات جميرا للجولف	1 September 2021		Underground	Side
●		74	Dubai Investment Park	مجمع دبي للاستثمار	1 June 2021		Underground	Side
●		76	Expo 2020	2020 اكسبو	1 June 2021	Expo City Dubai	Elevated	Island and Side

== Services ==
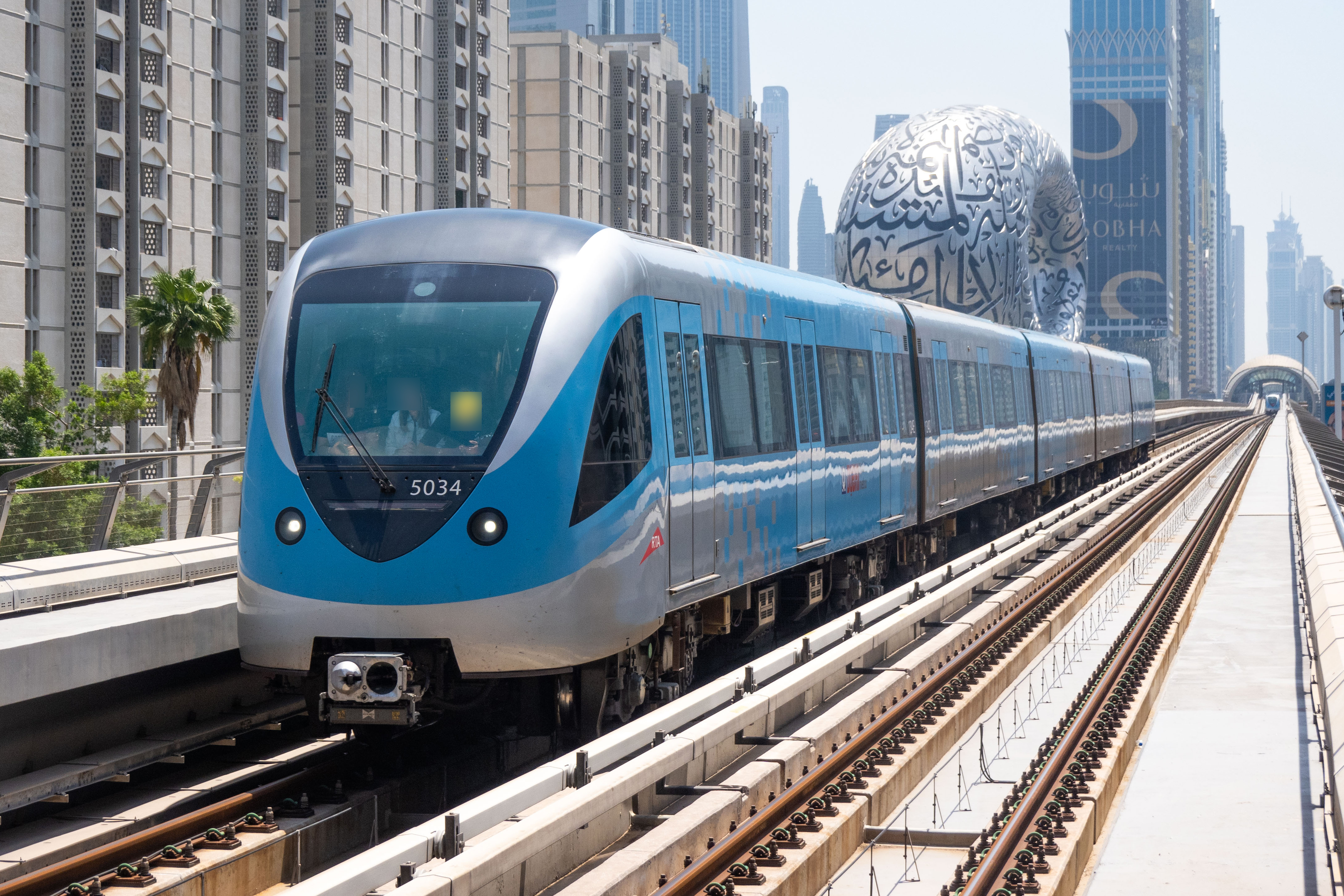
Set 5034 entering World Trade Centre station

The entire journey time on the Red Line is approximately 74 minutes, travelling at a maximum speed of 110 kilometres per hour (68 mph), with 20–30 seconds of stopping time at each station. The average time between stations on the Red Line is 60–90 seconds. The RTA operates 27 trains in the morning peak hours and 29 trains in the evening peak hours, with the interval between train services ranging from 6 to 8 minutes in the morning peak period, and from 5 to 6 minutes in the evening peak period.

On 1 September 2025, the RTA announced the introduction of a new peak-hour service between Centrepoint and Al Fardan Exchange to ease congestion. These services will terminate in the middle platform at Al Fardan Exchange.

== Commercial station branding naming ==
The Dubai Roads and Transport Authority (RTA) has benefited significantly from businesses along the routes of the Red and Green lines sponsoring nearby stations. The naming initiative has so far generated over Dh2 billion in revenue for the RTA. On average, each station has brought in Dh90-100 million.

On 13 May 2010, it was announced that Al Quoz station, which opened on 15 May, would be named Noor Islamic Bank. This announcement that Noor Islamic Bank won the right to name Al Quoz Station for a period of ten years was made in the presence of the bank's representatives at the RTA headquarters in Dubai. Moreover, several other stations on the Red Line have been named after local and international corporate giants, including the airline Emirates, GGICO, Abu Dhabi Commercial Bank (Al Karama), First Abu Dhabi Bank, Sharaf DG, Nakheel Properties, DAMAC Properties (Dubai Marina), Danube (Jebel Ali Industrial) and Mashreq.

Current station name	Date	Previous station name(s)	Date of change
Centrepoint	4 August 2021	Rashidiya	
BurJuman	12 December 2012	Khalid bin Al Waleed	
ADCB	15 September 2014	Al Karama	
Max	4 August 2021	Al Jafiliya	
GARMIN	11 January 2023	Noor Islamic Bank	
GARMIN	11 January 2023	Noor Bank	
GARMIN	11 January 2023	Al Safa	30 November 2020
Equiti	18 April 2022	First Gulf Bank	
Equiti	18 April 2022	First Abu Dhabi Bank	
Equiti	18 April 2022	Umm Al Sheif	25 November 2020
Insurance Market	5 September 2024	Mashreq	
Al Khail	25 November 2020	Nakheel	
Sobha Realty	9 August 2021	Dubai Marina	
Sobha Realty	9 August 2021	DAMAC Properties	
Sobha Realty	9 August 2021	Dubai Marina	25 November 2020
DMCC	13 August 2018	Jumeirah Lakes Towers	
Jabal Ali	18 May 2020	Nakheel Harbour & Tower	
Danube	12 November 2012	Jebel Ali Industrial	
UAE Exchange	28 June 2015	Jebel Ali	

Station code/number	Current name	Previous name(s)	Start date	End date
11	Centrepoint	Rashidiya		3 August 2021
15	Al Garhoud	Garhoud		
15	Al Garhoud	GGICO		
16	City Centre Deira	Deira City Centre		
19	BurJuman	Khalid Bin Al Waleed		11 December 2012
20	ADCB	Al Karama		14 September 2014
21	Max (styled as max)	Al Jafiliya		3 August 2021
29	Onpassive	Noor Islamic Bank		
29	Onpassive	Noor Bank		
29	Onpassive	Al Safa	30 November 2020	10 January 2023
31	Equiti (styled as equiti)	FGB (First Gulf Bank)		
31	Equiti (styled as equiti)	First Abu Dhabi Bank		24 November 2020
31	Equiti (styled as equiti)	Umm Al Sheif	25 November 2020	17 April 2022
33	Insurance Market	Sharaf DG		
33	Insurance Market	Mashreq		4 September 2024
35	Al Fardan Exchange	Nakheel		24 November 2020
35	Al Fardan Exchange	Al Khail	25 November 2020	
36	Sobha Realty	Dubai Marina		
36	Sobha Realty	DAMAC Properties		
36	Sobha Realty	Dubai Marina	25 November 2020	8 August 2021
37	DMCC	Jumeirah Lakes Towers		12 August 2018
38	National Paints	Nakheel Harbour & Tower		17 May 2020
38	National Paints	Jabal Ali	18 May 2020	
40	Energy	DUBAL		
41	Danube	Jebel Ali Industrial		11 November 2012
42	Life Pharmacy	Jebel Ali		27 June 2015
42	Life Pharmacy	UAE Exchange	28 June 2015	
