= Expo 2020 (Dubai Metro) =

Metro station in Dubai, UAE

Expo 2020 2020 اكسبو

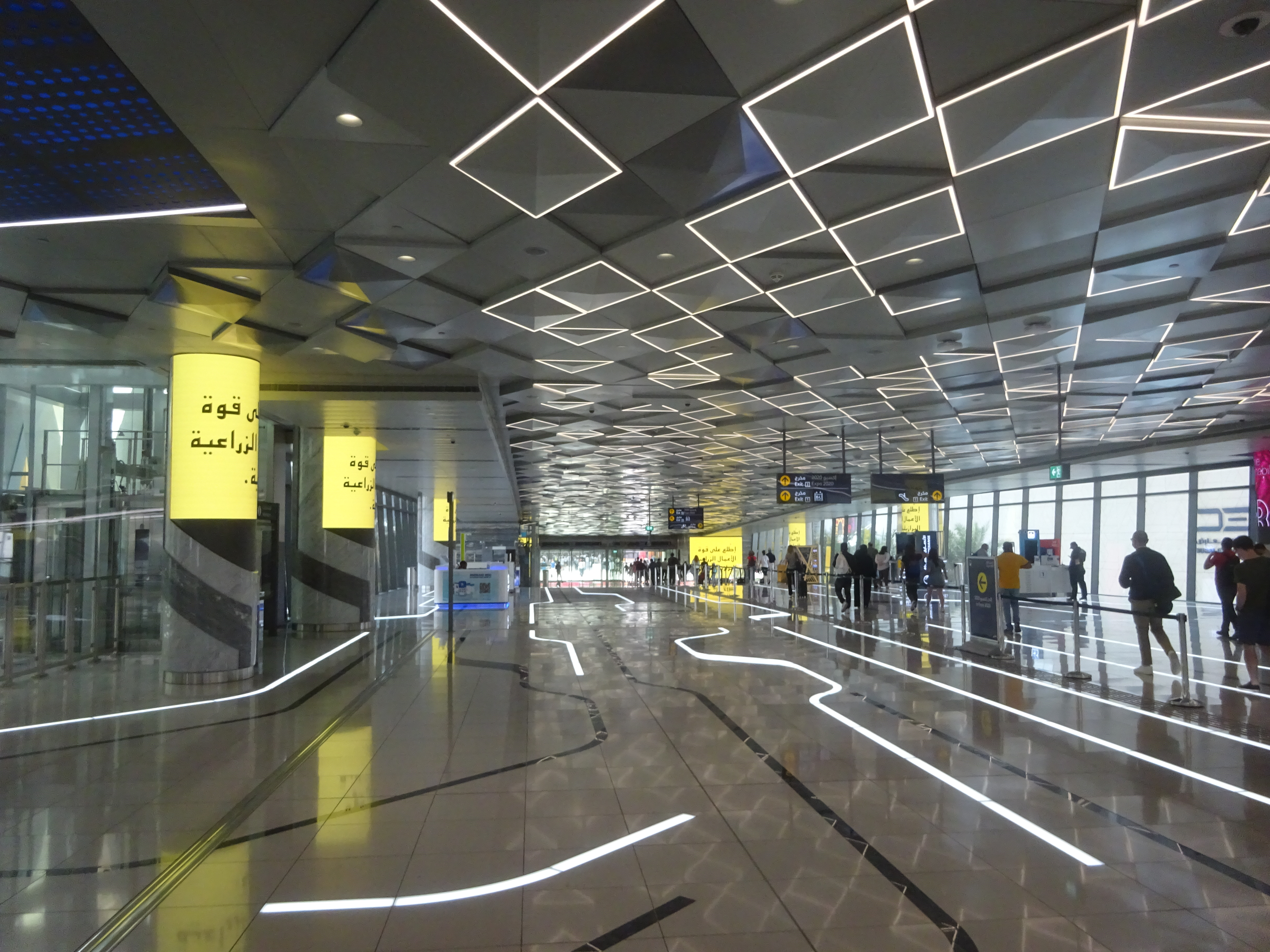
- Inside the Expo 2020 metro station

General information
- Location: Expo 2020, Madinat Al Mataar; Dubai; United Arab Emirates
- Coordinates: 24.96357°N 55.14623°E
- System: Metro Station
- Operator: Dubai Metro
- Line: Red
- Platforms: 2
- Tracks: 3
- Connections: RTA Dubai: DS1 EXPO 2020 MS - Dubai South; F55 EXPO 2020 MS - Al Maktoum Intl Airport

Other information
- Station code: 76
- Fare zone: 1

History
- Opened: 1 June 2021

Services
Preceding station	Dubai Metro	Following station
Terminus	Red Line Expo 2020 branch	Dubai Investment Park towards Centrepoint
Route map
Location

Expo 2020 (Arabic: اكسبو 2020) is a rapid transit station on the Route 2020 branch of the Red Line of the Dubai Metro in Dubai, United Arab Emirates.

The metro station opened on 1 June 2021 as part of Route 2020, created to link central Dubai to the Expo 2020 exhibition site. The schedule was delayed due to the COVID-19 pandemic in the United Arab Emirates.

The travel time between Centrepoint metro station at the northern terminus of the Red Line and the Expo 2020 station is reported to be 1 hour 14 minutes with a service frequency of 2 minutes and 38 seconds during peak times (24 trains per hour in each direction), and a capacity of 16,000 passengers per hour in each direction.

The station is located to the northeast of the Expo 2020 site, with direct access to the main entrance leading to the Al Wasl Plaza. It is the final station on Route 2020, although there are plans to extend the line to Al Maktoum International Airport to the south. In the meantime, a bus service operates between Expo 2020 and the airport.

The station will be renamed Expo City Dubai, after the planned development for the Expo site.

== Station Layout ==
G	Street Level	Exit/ Entrance
L1	Mezzanine	Fare control, station agent, Metro Card vending machines, crossover
L2	Side platform | Doors will open on the right
L2	Platform 1 Northbound	Towards ← Centrepoint; Next Station: Dubai Investment Park
L2	Platform 2 Southbound	Towards → Train Terminates Here
L2	Island platform | P2 Doors will open on the right | P3 Doors will open on the left
L2	Platform 3 Southbound	Towards → Train Terminates Here
L2	Note:
