= Al Muntazah, Dubai =

Community complex in Dubai, UAE

Coordinates: 25.02984°N 55.11305°E

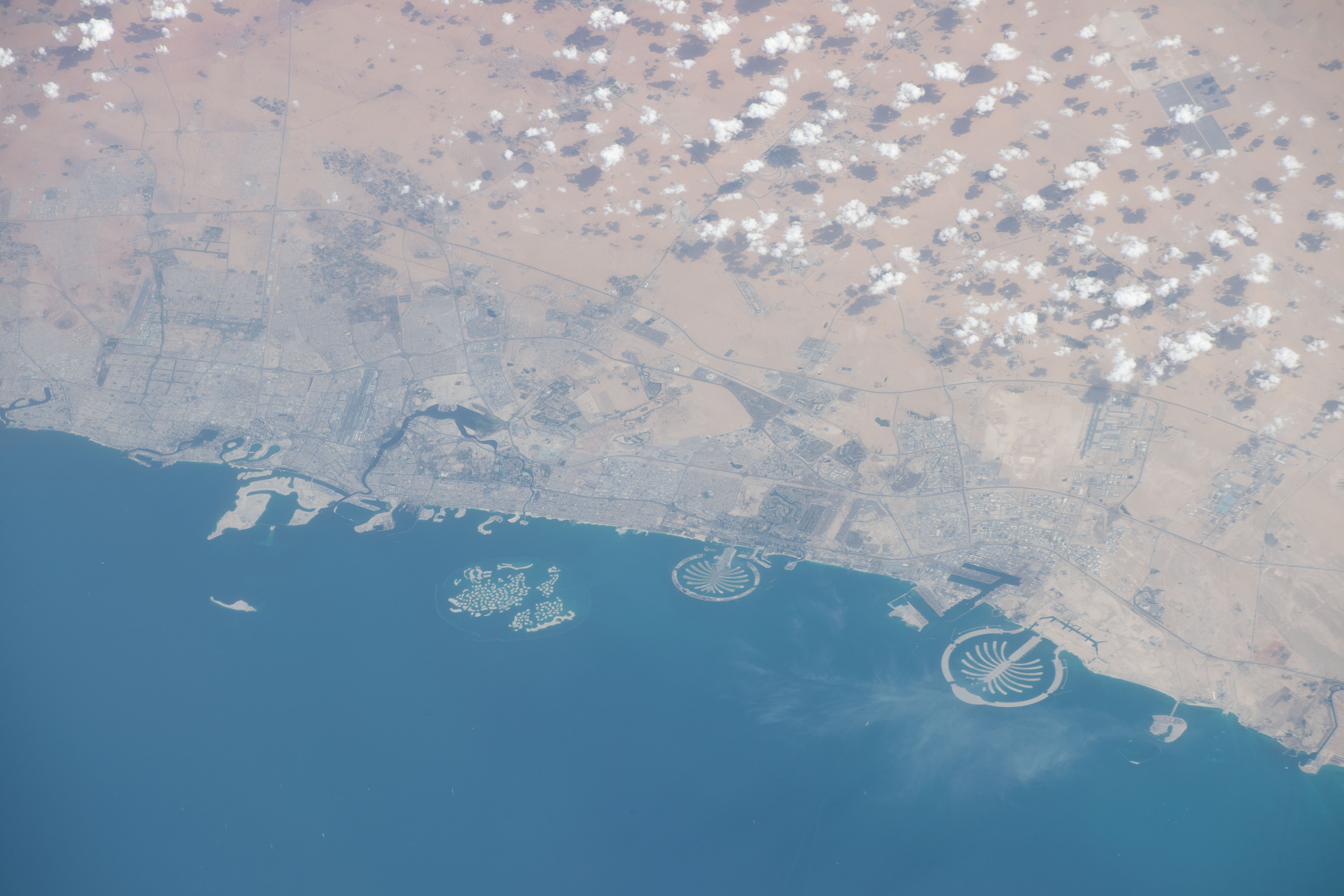
Aerial view of Dubai. Al Muntazah is located approximately halfway between the clearly visible Palm Jumeirah (left) and Palm Jebel Ali (right), just inland from Sheikh Zayed Road

Al Muntazah is a neighbourhood complex in the Jebel Ali Village district of southern Dubai, United Arab Emirates.

Al Muntazah is close to the Ibn Battuta Mall to the north. Immediately to the south is the Churches Complex, including churches and temples such as the St Francis of Assisi Catholic Church and the Christ Church Jebel Ali Anglican Church. The nearest Dubai Metro station is the Energy metro station on the Red Line to the west. To the north is the Jebel Ali Recreation Club. To the east is the Etisalat Jebel Ali Data Centre (JADC), the largest data centre campus in the Middle East.

== See also ==
- Churches Complex
