= Sikhism in the United Arab Emirates =

Sikhism in the United Arab Emirates السيخية في الإمارات

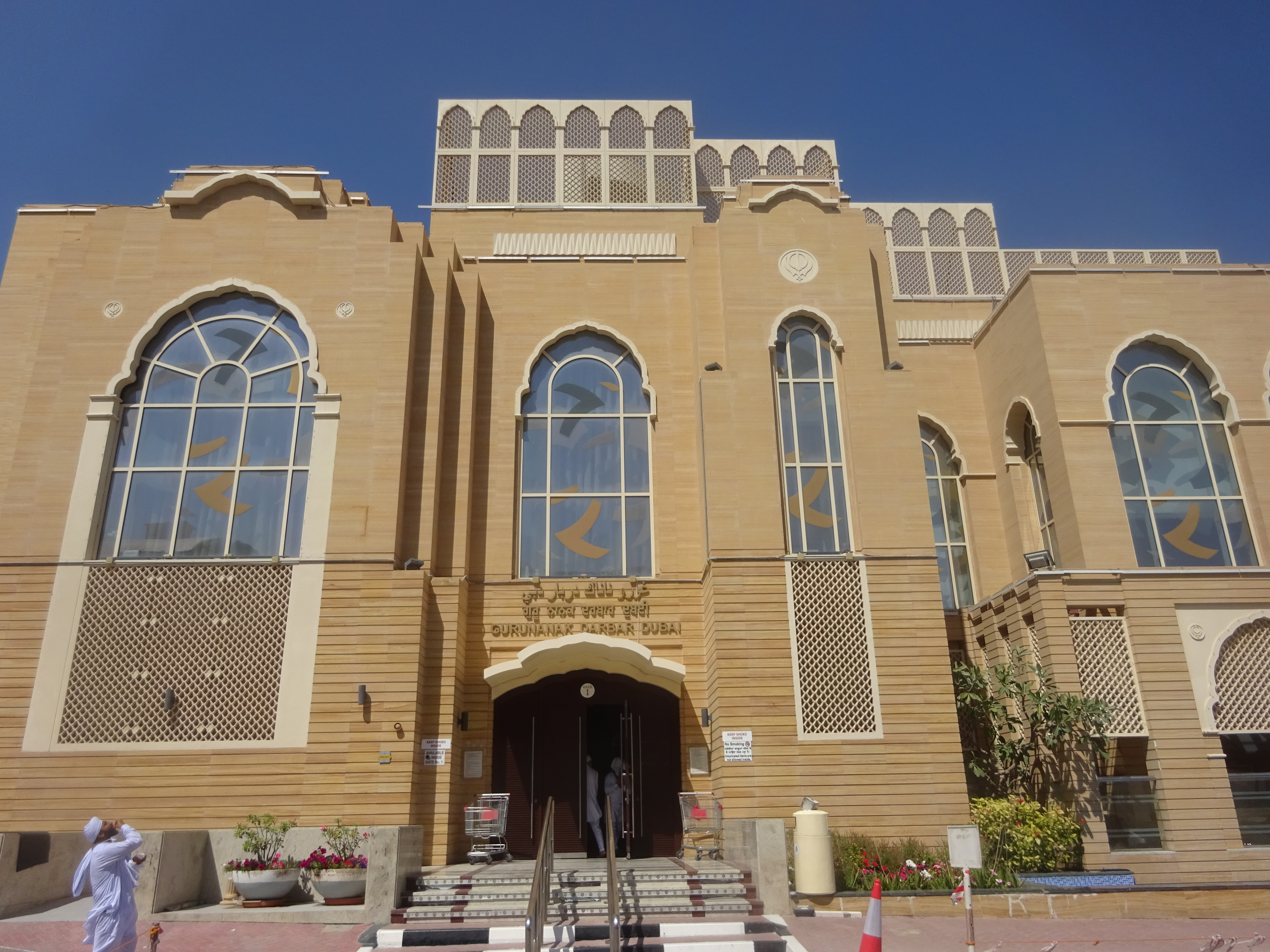
- Guru Nanak Darbar, Dubai

Total population
- 100,000

Regions with significant populations
- Dubai · Sharjah · Abu Dhabi

Religions
- Sikhism

Languages
- Punjabi · Arabic

Sikhism in the United Arab Emirates has a following of over 100,000. The majority of Sikhs in the UAE can be found in Dubai, Abu Dhabi or Sharjah.

== Migration ==
In recent years, there has been an increase in the migration of Sikhs to the United Arab Emirates (UAE). Sikhs, have been attracted to the UAE due to economic opportunities. Many Sikhs have chosen to relocate to the UAE, establishing business or finding employment in various sectors such as construction, hospitality, and finance, which has played a role in the country's economy.

Most Sikh expatriates are coming from India. However, there has been an increase in Sikhs from United Kingdom, United States and Canada for employment and business opportunities.

== Gurdwara ==
The Sikh Gurdwara in Dubai, Guru Nanak Darbar, serves over 10,000 worshippers. In June 2010, foundations were laid for the Guru Nanak Darbar. At a cost of $20 million, the large gurdwara, opened in October 2022, is located in Jebel Ali, Dubai and is the first 'official' Sikh temple in the entire Gulf, catering to the needs of the local Sikh community. An area of 25,400 sq ft (2,360 m^{2}) of land was given by Sheikh Mohammed bin Rashid Al Maktoum for the construction of the building. A community member and local businessman who proposed the gurdwara remarked "My dream is to make Guru Nanak Durbar the best, second only to the Golden Temple in Amritsar.

Gurunanak Darbar is modelled on both the Golden Temple and the gurdwara in Southall, London by Interior designer Paul Bishop. Apart from a large carpeted prayer hall, there are three smaller rooms for private functions, a meditation room, a library and the spacious 'langar' or common kitchen hall. The state-of-the-art kitchen can serve the 10,000 plus worshipers who come every Friday.

To develop religious values among the next generation of NRIs, special three-hour sessions are held for children on Saturdays at the temple where they are taught Punjabi, 'Kirtans' and how to behave in places of worship.
