= Danube (Dubai Metro) =

Metro station in Dubai, United Arab Emirates

Danube دانوب

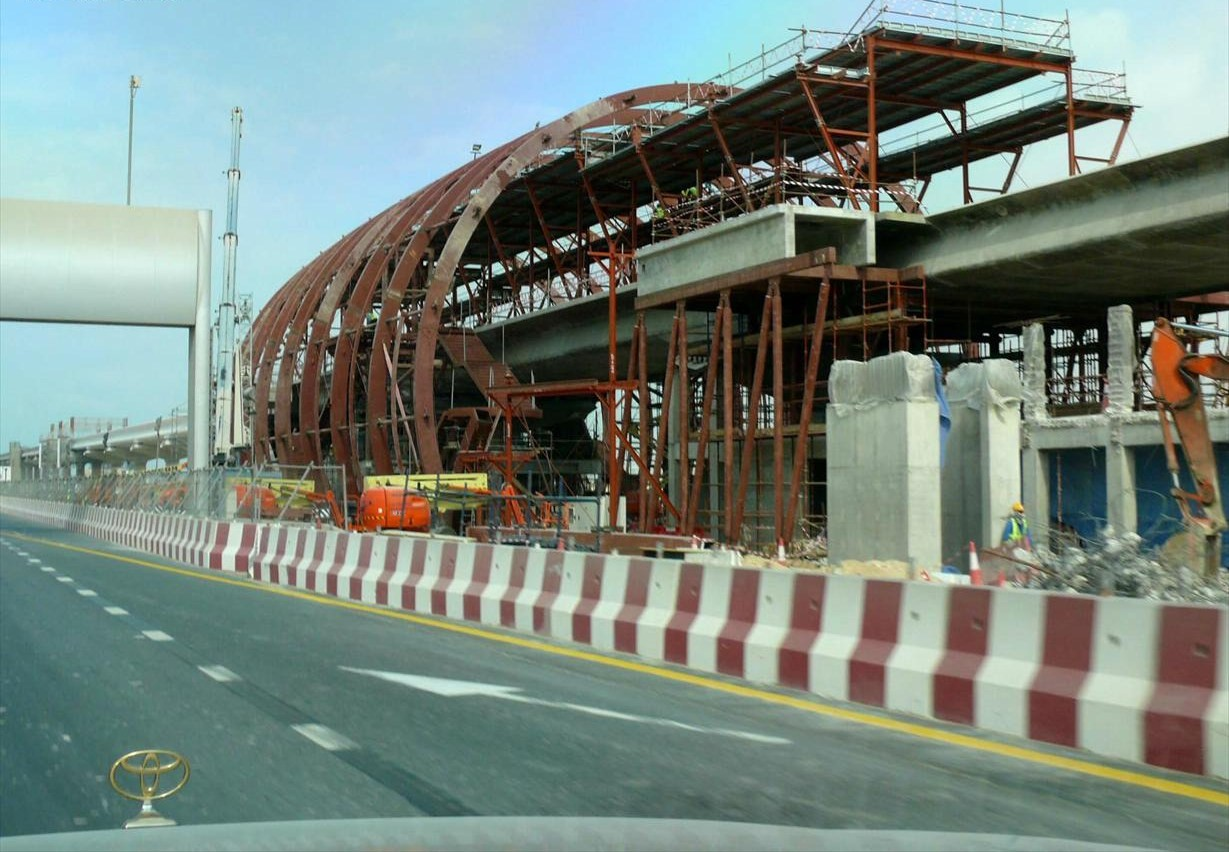
- Jebel Ali Industrial metro station under construction in 2008, now Danube metro station

General information
- Location: Sheikh Zayed Road; Jabal Ali Industrial First; Dubai, United Arab Emirates
- Coordinates: 25.00110°N 55.09575°E
- System: Metro Station
- Operator: Dubai Metro
- Line: Red Line
- Platforms: 2
- Tracks: 2
- Connections: RTA Dubai: 95A Parco Hypermarket - Jebel Ali Waterfront Labour Camp; 56 Danube Metro Stn - DWC, Staff Village; F47 Danube MS - DIP Metro Bus Stop; F48 Danube MS - DIP 2; F49 Danube MS - Jebel Ali Industrial Area; F53 Danube MS - Dubai Industrial City; F54 Danube MS - JAFZA South

Other information
- Station code: 41
- Fare zone: 2

History
- Opened: December 12, 2012
- Former names: Jebel Ali Industrial

Services
Preceding station	Dubai Metro	Following station
Life Pharmacy Terminus	Red Line Life Pharmacy branch	Energy towards Centrepoint
Location

Danube (Arabic: دانوب; formerly Jebel Ali Industrial) is a rapid transit station on the Red Line of the Dubai Metro in Dubai, UAE, serving Jebel Ali and surrounding areas.

The station opened as part of the Red Line on 12 December 2012.

Danube station is located on the Sheikh Zayed Road between the junctions with the D57 and E77 roads. To the east is Jabal Ali Industrial 1. To the west is Mena Jabal Ali. The station is close to a number of bus routes.

== Station layout ==
G	Street level	Exit/Entrance
L1	Mezzanine	Automatic Fare Collection gates, station agent, crossover
L2	Side platform | Doors will open on the right
L2	Platform 2 Southbound	Towards ← Life Pharmacy
L2	Platform 1 Northbound	Towards → Centrepoint; Next Station: Energy
L2	Side platform | Doors will open on the right

== See also ==
- Danube station (Paris Metro)
