= Churches Complex =

Coordinates: 25°1′34.54″N 55°6′50.15″E

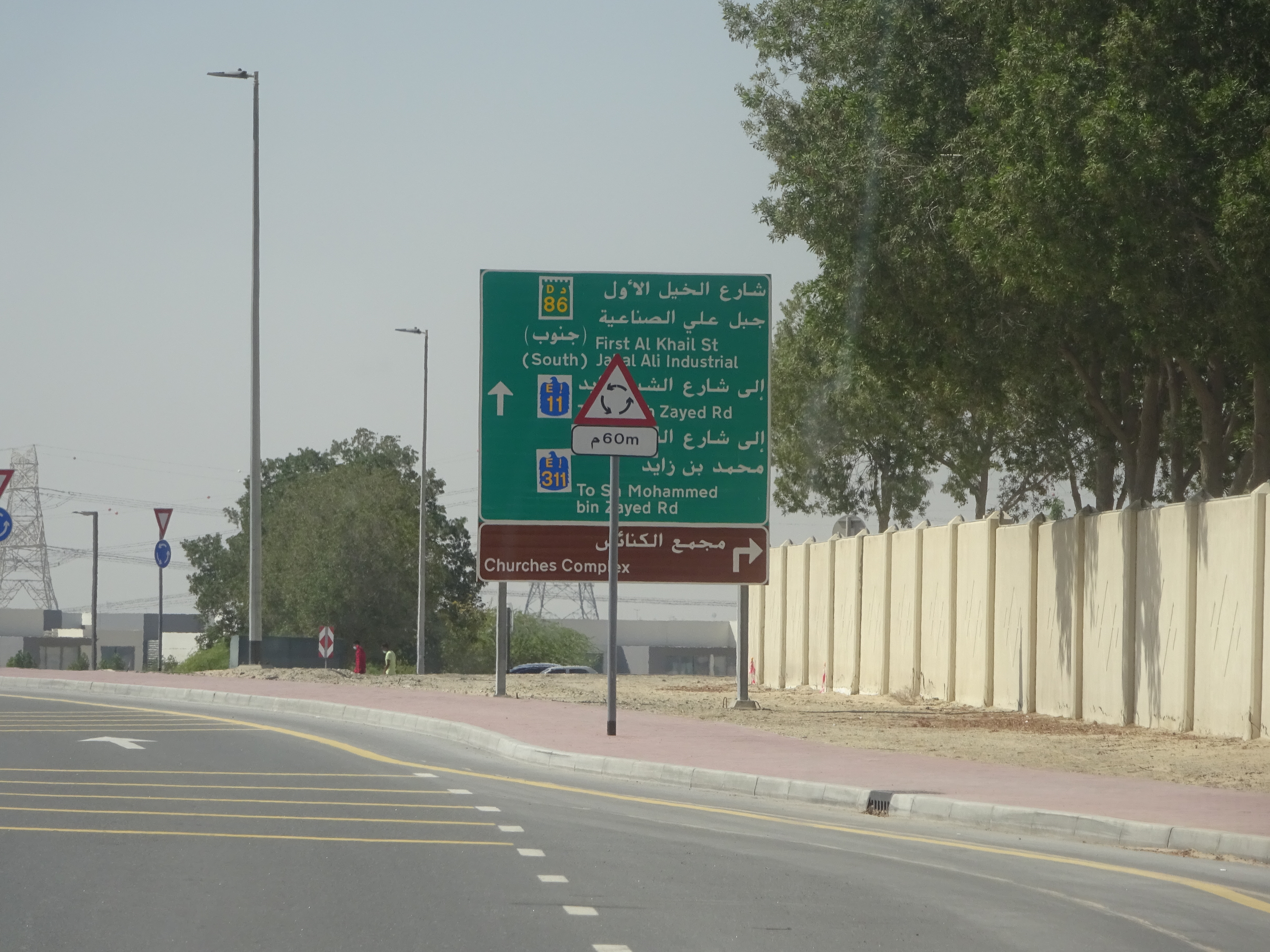
Road sign for the Churches Complex

The Churches Complex in Jebel Ali Village, Dubai, United Arab Emirates, is an area for a number of churches and temples of different religious denominations, especially Christian denominations. It is located immediately to south of the Al Muntazah residential neighbourhood complex.

== Churches and temples ==
Churches and temples in the complex include:

- St Francis of Assisi Catholic Church
- Christ Church Jebel Ali Anglican Church
- The Evangelical Christian Church of Dubai
- St Mina Coptic Orthodox Church
- The Mar Thoma Parish church
- Mor Ignatius Jacobite Syrian Orthodox Cathedral
- Archdiocese of Roum Orthodox Church
- Gurunanak Darbar Dubai Sikh Temple
- Hindu Temple, Jebel Ali

== Gallery ==
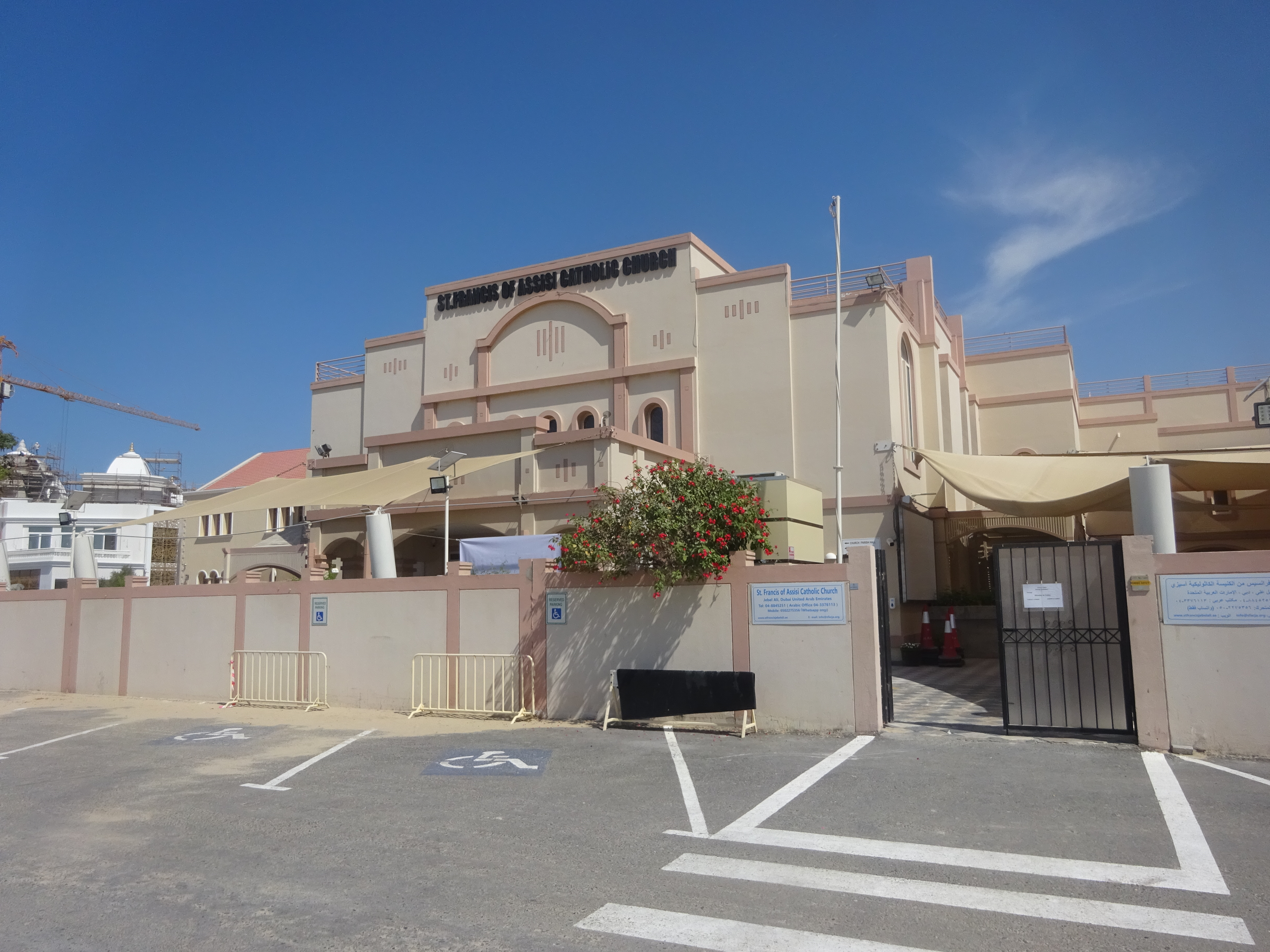
St Francis of Assisi Church

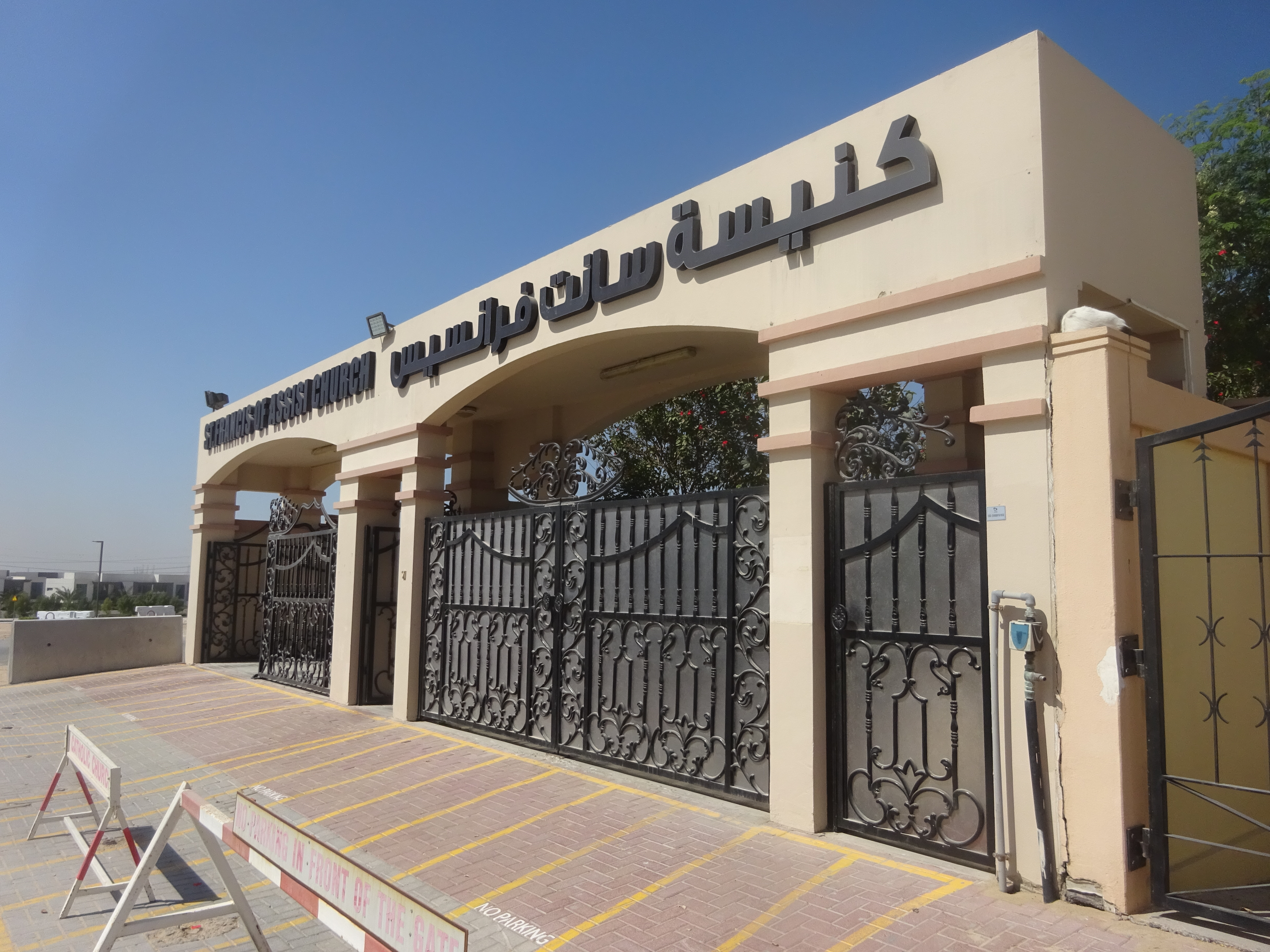
St Francis of Assisi Church entrance

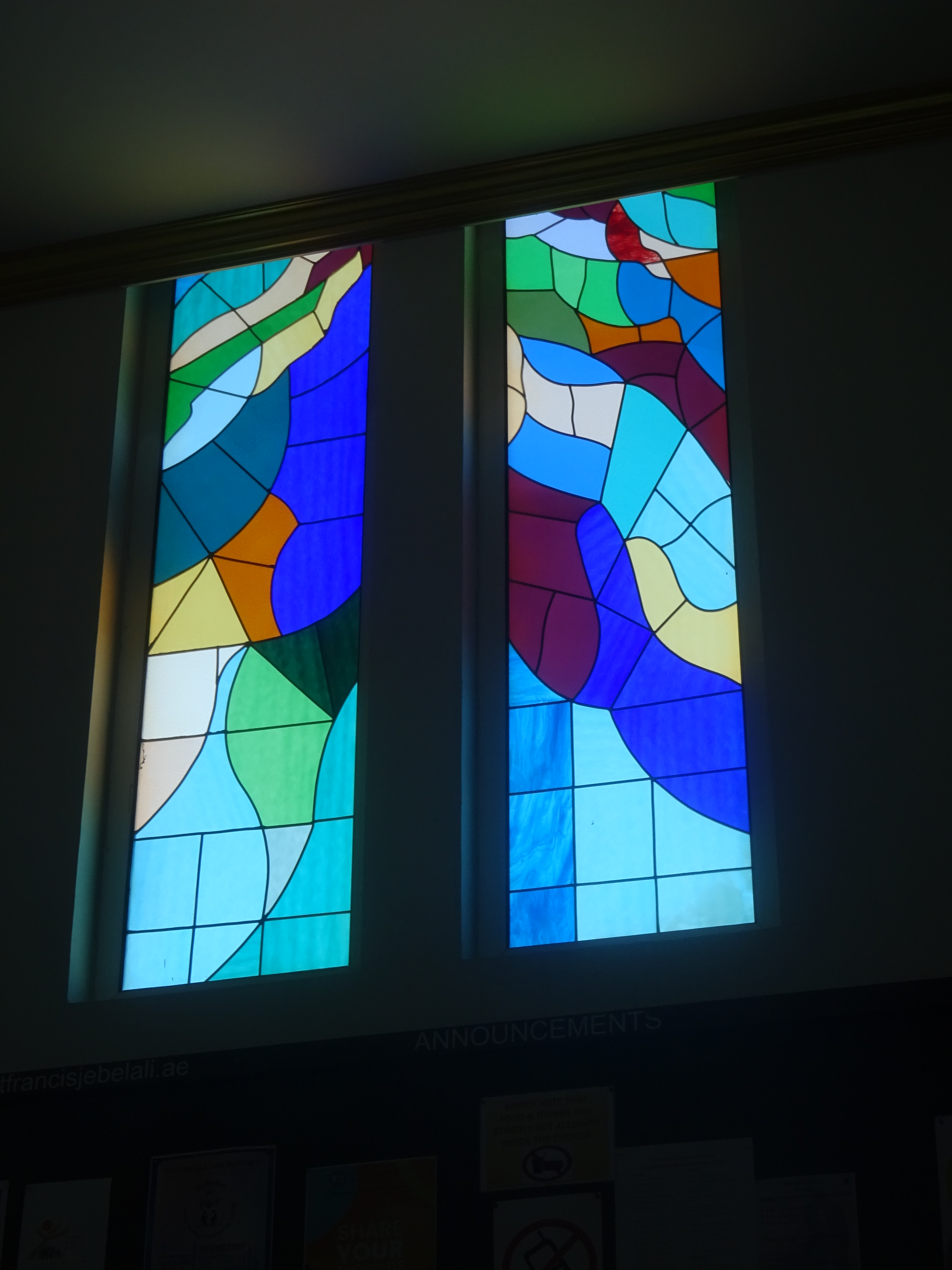
St Francis of Assisi Church stained glass window

The Evangelical Christian Church of Dubai

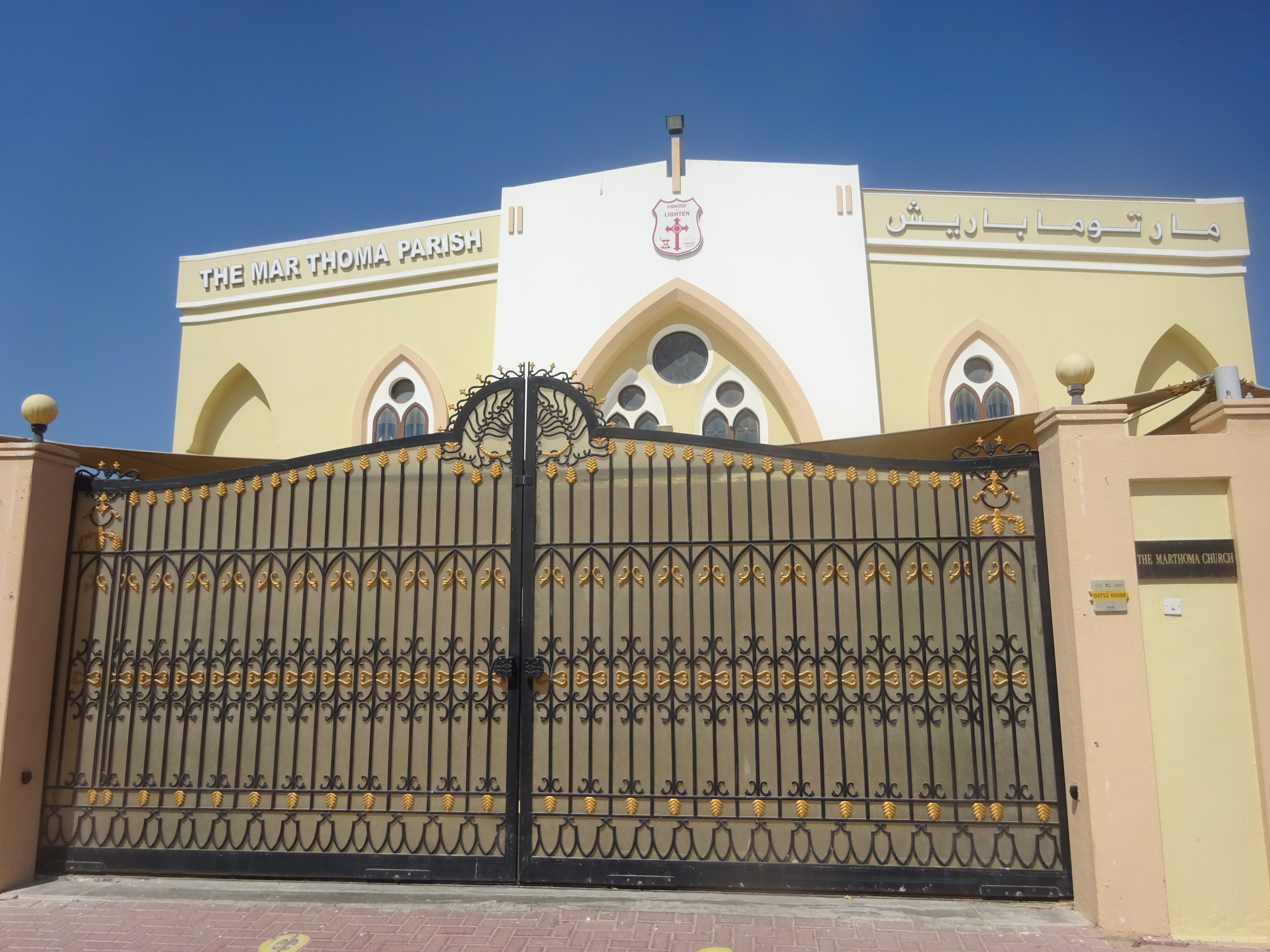
The Mar Thoma Parish Church

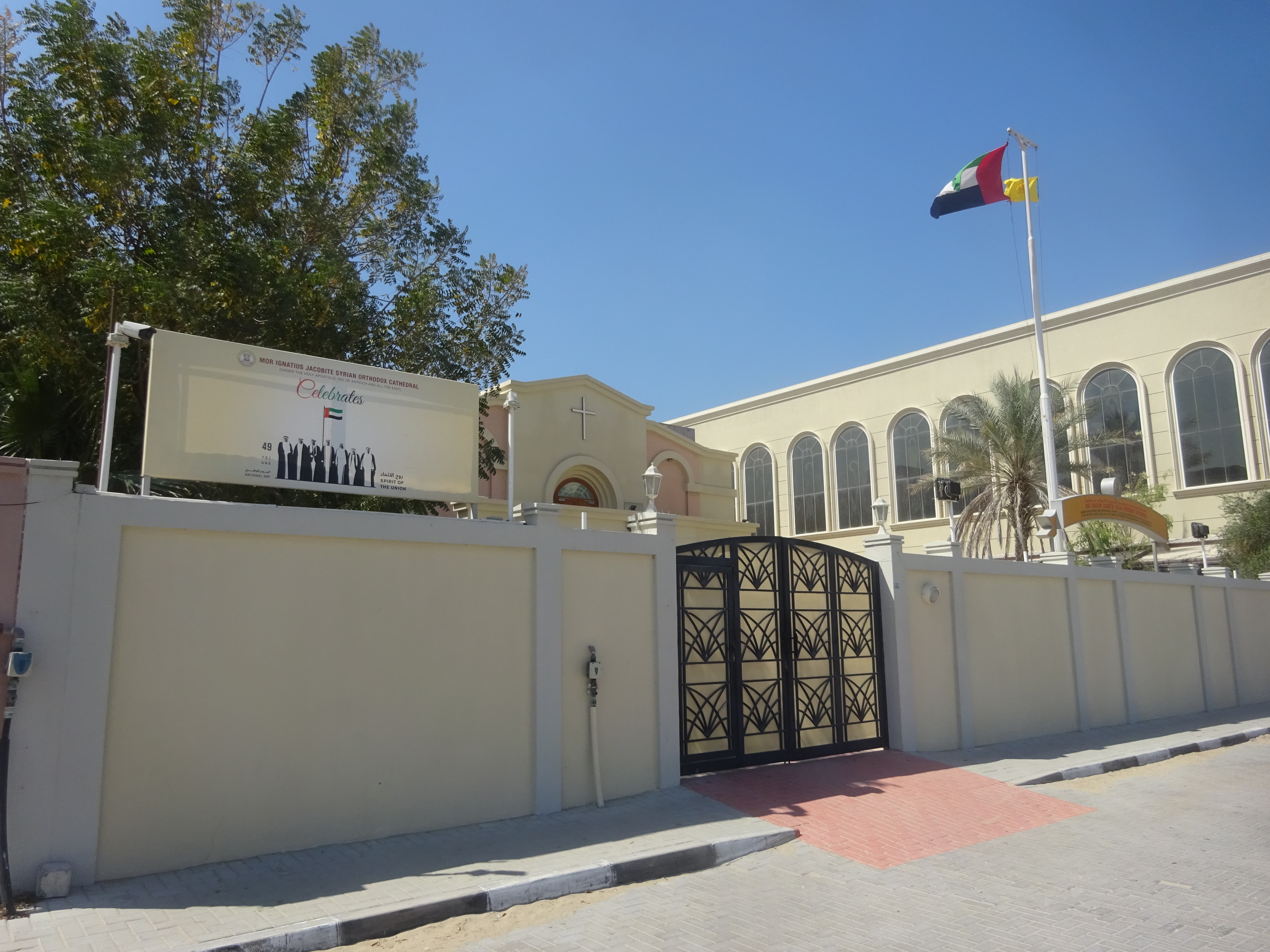
Mor Ignatius Jacobite Syrian Orthodox Cathedral

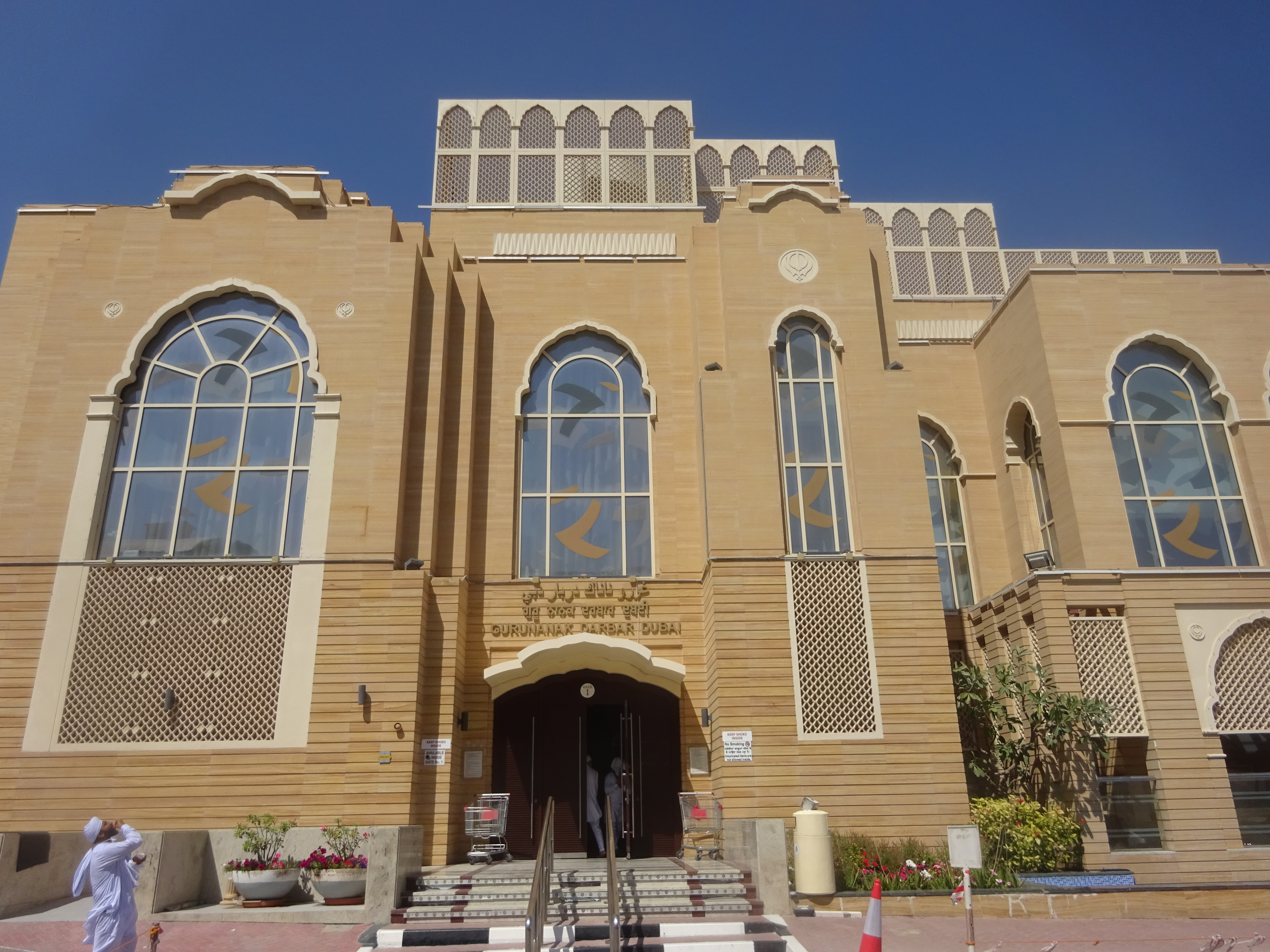
Gurunanak Darbar Dubai Sikh Temple

== Location and transport ==
The Churches Complex is close to the Ibn Battuta Mall to the north. The nearest Dubai Metro station is the Energy metro station on the Red Line to the west. Both are connected to the complex by the F44 feeder bus service.
