= Evangelical Christian Church of Dubai =

Coordinates: 25°1′34.0″N 55°6′52.7″E

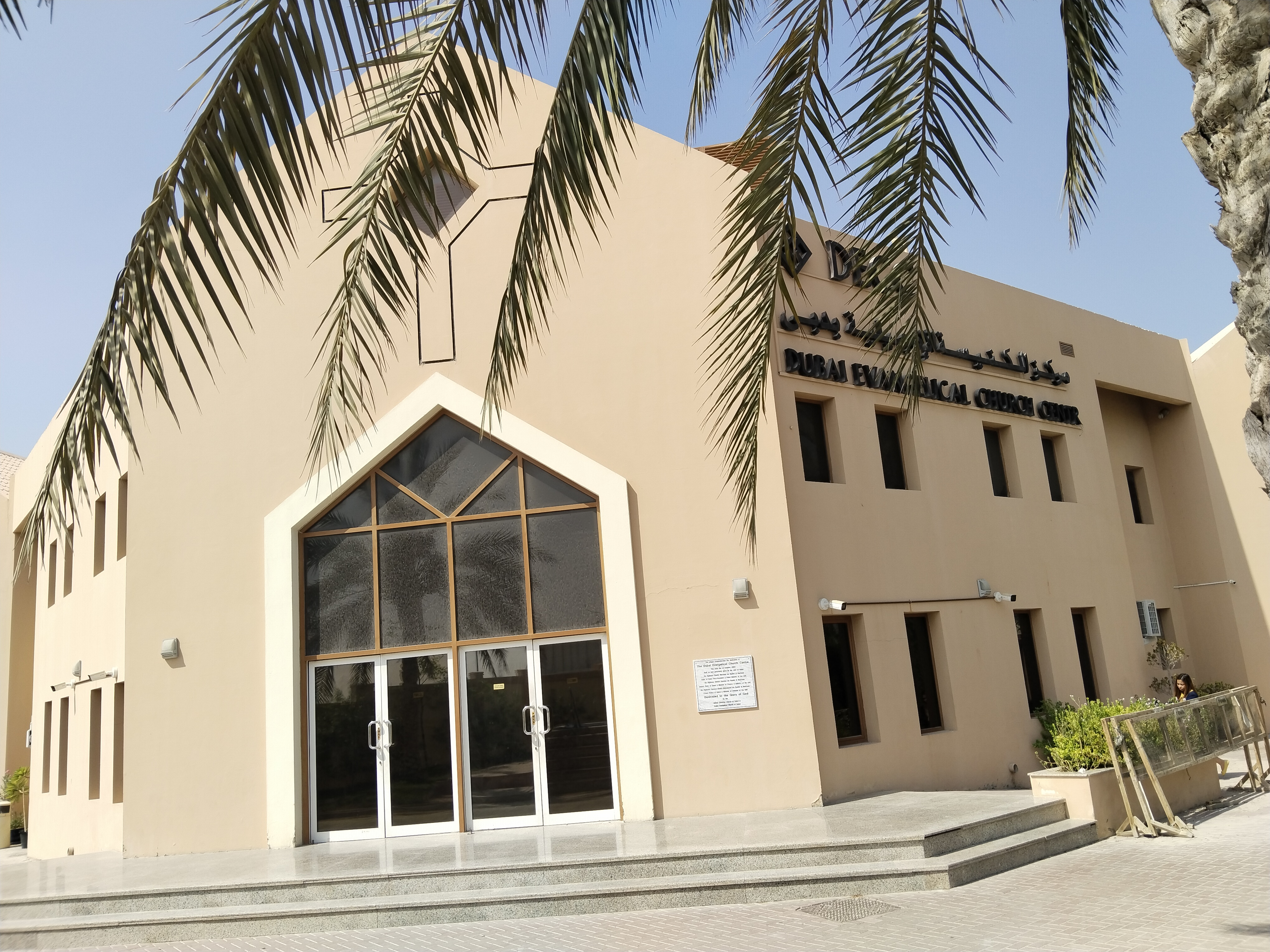
- Evangelical Christian Church of Dubai building entrance
- Evangelical Christian Church of Dubai
- Location: Churches Complex, Jebel Ali Village, Dubai
- Country: United Arab Emirates
- Denomination: Evangelical
- Website: eccdubai.org

History
- Founded: 1972; 54 years ago

Specifications
- Capacity: 1500

The Evangelical Christian Church of Dubai (ECCD) is an evangelical church located in the United Arab Emirates. It was established in 1972 by expatriates in the oil and gas industry. Later, the church changed its name to the International Christian Church of Dubai (ICCD, 1983) and later to the United Christian Church of Dubai (UCCD, 1992) before reverting to its original name, the Evangelical Christian Church of Dubai, in 2022.

== History ==
In 1972, four months after the founding of the United Arab Emirates, a dedicated group of evangelical Christians in Dubai determined that they should begin gathering regularly for worship. The Evangelical Christian Church of Dubai was formed in March 1972, bringing together individuals from diverse nations, united by a shared belief in the authority of the Bible and a commitment to embodying Christ's command to love others. These expat professionals, mostly oil and gas workers, partnered with trained Christian pastors to start the church. A number of these original members came to Dubai from Al Ain's Oasis Hospital—an evangelical mission hospital founded over a decade earlier at the request of his highness Sheikh Zayed bin Sultan Al Nahyan.

In 1997, the prayers of the community were answered when land for an Evangelical Church building in Jebel Ali was graciously granted by His Highness Sheikh Hamdan bin Rashid al Maktoum, Deputy Ruler of Dubai, and His Highness Sheikh Mohammed bin Rashid al Maktoum, Crown Prince of Dubai. With gratitude to God, the congregation dedicated of the building on October 24, 2003. This has been the physical home for ECCD ever since.

Over the years, the congregation grew to many hundreds of evangelical Christians gathering weekly for worship. Recognizing that the evangelical community in Dubai surpassed the capacity of a single building, the church established Redeemer Church of Dubai in 2010 on the opposite side of the city. Additionally, in 2012, the ruler of Ras al Khaimah generously provided land for the construction of the RAK Evangelical Church, which became the fourth evangelical Church building in the UAE.

For more than 50 years, the Evangelical Christian Church of Dubai has worked to service the evangelical believers living and working in Dubai.

== See also ==
- Churches Complex
- Christianity in the United Arab Emirates
- Religion in the United Arab Emirates
