= Guru Nanak Darbar, Dubai =

Coordinates: 25.02725°N 55.11333°E

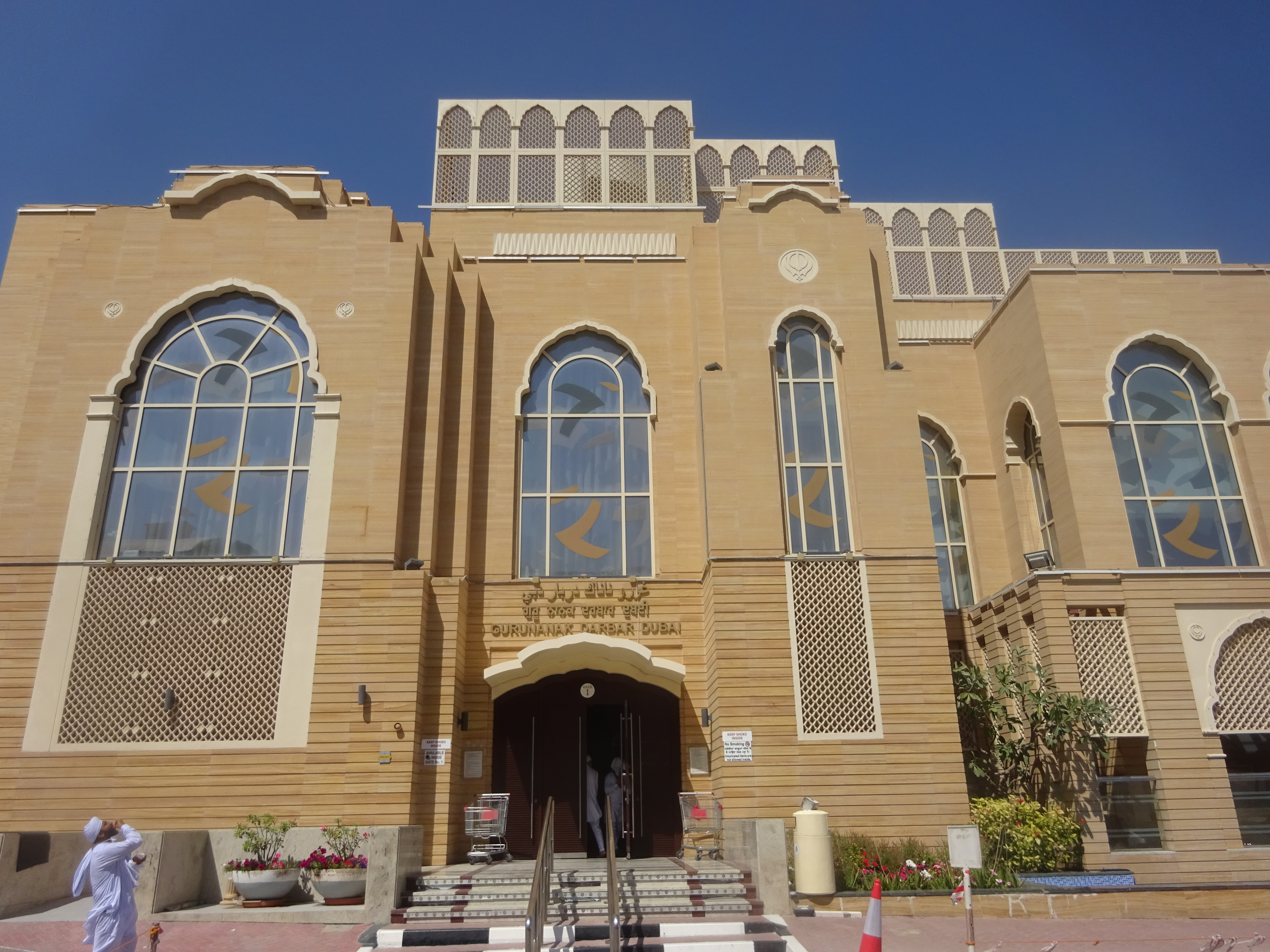
Guru Nanak Darbar

The Guru Nanak Darbar is a Sikh gurdwara at the Churches Complex in Jebel Ali Village, Dubai, founded in 2012 to serve over 50,000 Sikh residents in the Emirate. The community-run gurdwara is the first official Sikh gurudwara in the GCC region and the Middle East, and it was established by Surender Singh Kandhari, a resident of Dubai since 1976.

The Guru Nanak Darbar entered in April 2017 the Guinness World Records after it served breakfast to more than 600 people from 101 nationalities.

== Construction ==
The Guru Nanak Darbar was established in a plot of land of 120,000-square-feet.

The venue was designed by the Dubai-based architect firm Holford Associates. The architects visited gurudwaras in different parts of the world for inspiration.

Construction work started in May 2008, the foundations were laid in June 2010, and the three-storey structure was completed in December 2011. The Sikh community in the UAE had requested a 100-year guarantee from the contractor so that the future generations can continue to use it.

The total cost of the construction works was 65 million dirhams (about $20 million), and it opened its doors to worshippers and visitors, including tourists, on 17 January 2012 in a ceremony attended by 50,000 devotees. The construction for the project initially struggled due to the 2008 financial crisis.

== Design ==
The beige-coloured Guru Nanak Darbar is a blend of modern and traditional Sikh building style. It has three levels of underground car parks and two above ground, and the area of each basement is 25,000 square feet to accommodate 140 cars.

The ground floor (21,000 square feet) includes the reception desk, the Gurdwara’s office, a dining hall, a kitchen, a pantry, and store rooms. There are also convenience rooms, a headscarf stand, shoe storage areas, Jora Ghar facilities in several parts of the building.

The building’s façade features a 54-meter Parikarma coated with traditional grill work, and a water body surrounds part of the building to resemble the Sarovar of the Harmandir Sahib (Golden Temple).

The Prayer Hall on the first floor has Italian marble on the walls and floor, chandeliers from Murano, Italy, and a purple carpet. It also features 24-carat gold canopies for the Guru Granth Sahib, and in the centre, there is a raised platform with carved gold-plated pillars and above it is a gold-plated lotus-shaped dome. The dome is lined with a piece of cloth that has gold lace at its edge.

== ISO Certification ==
The Guru Nanak Darbar is the world’s first gurudwara to receive ISO Certifications, which were in the areas of Quality Management Standard (ISO 9001:2015), Environmental Management Standard (ISO 14001:2004), Occupational Health and Safety Management Standard (OHSAS 18001:2007), and Food Safety Management Standard (ISO 20000:2005).

== Services ==
The Guru Nanak Darbar holds three-hour classes for children on Saturdays to teach them Punjabi, Kirtan, and Gurdwara protocol.

Services offered at the gurudwara include Akhand Path sahib, Sehaj Path, Sukhmani Sahib Path, Kirtan, Langar, child-naming ceremonies, engagements, Anand Karaj (wedding ceremonies), matrimonial services, house-warming prayers, birthday or anniversary prayers, and condolence or memorial prayers.

The Gurudwara houses several facilities at the community’s disposal, and these include a meditation room, a library, Kirtan classes, and Gurbani Santhiya classes.

== Visitors ==
Before the COVID-19 pandemic, in March 2020, around 10,000 people visited the Gurdwara every Friday, including Afghani Sikhs, Sindhis, and Hindu Punjabis.

== COVID-19 Response ==
In response to the COVID-19 pandemic, the Guru Nanak Darbar was closed for 110 days from April to July 2020 as part of the restrictions on places of worship to stop the spread of the virus. However, even after reopening, restricted timings were put in place for the devotees to visit the Sikh shrine, and these were from 9 am to 9.30 am and from 6 pm to 6.30 pm from Saturday to Thursday. In addition, devotees were required to wear masks and gloves, use hand sanitisers, maintain social distancing, and have their temperatures checked, and children under 12 years old and people over 60 years old were not allowed to enter for a specified period of time to ensure their safety.

As part of the UAE-wide efforts to immunize residents and citizens against the coronavirus, the Guru Nanak Darbar hosted an event from 6 to 8 February 2021 to vaccinate 4,500 adults of different religions and about 35 nationalities against COVID-19.
