= Energy (Dubai Metro) =

Metro station in Dubai, United Arab Emirates

Energy الطاقة

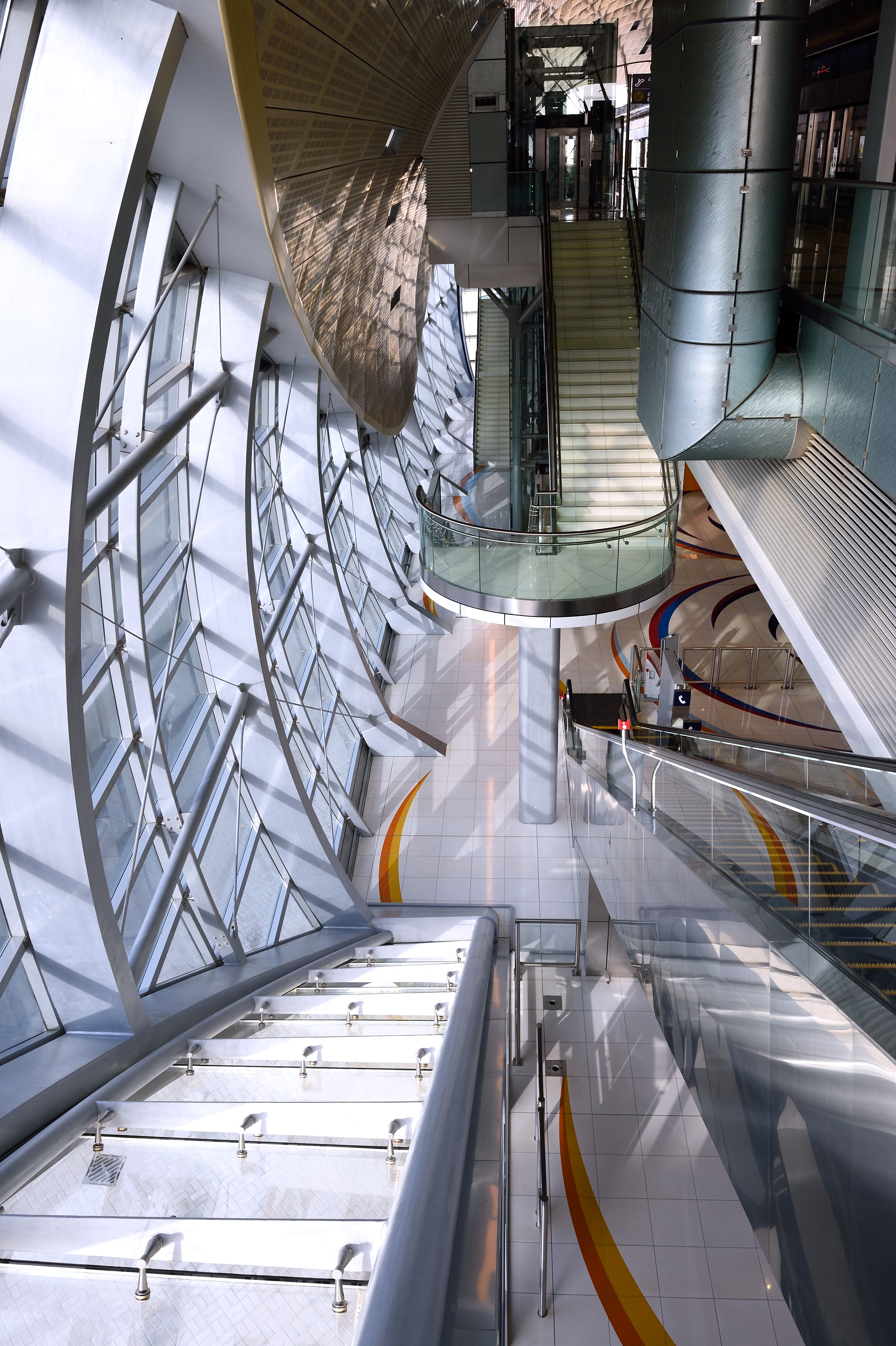
- Interior view of Energy metro station

General information
- Location: Sheikh Zayed Road; Jabal Ali First; Dubai, United Arab Emirates
- Coordinates: 25.02641°N 55.1012625°E
- System: Metro Station
- Operator: Dubai Metro
- Line: Red Line
- Platforms: 2
- Tracks: 2
- Connections: RTA Dubai: F44 Energy MS - Jebel Ali Gardens

Other information
- Station code: 40
- Fare zone: 2

History
- Opened: September 30, 2013 (originally); May 25, 2024 (reopened)

Services
Preceding station	Dubai Metro	Following station
Danube towards Life Pharmacy	Red Line Life Pharmacy branch	Ibn Battuta towards Centrepoint
Location

Energy (Arabic: الطاقة) is a rapid transit station on the Red Line of the Dubai Metro in Dubai, UAE, serving Jebel Ali and surrounding areas.

The station opened as part of the Red Line on 30 September 2013. It changed to Branch Line on June 1, 2021. The Energy Metro station was renamed from "DUBAL" in 2015. Flooding across Persian Gulf states in April 2024 temporarily closed the station.

Energy station is located on the Sheikh Zayed Road near the major junction with the D 57 road. Nearby are Festival Plaza and the Gurunanak Sikh Temple. Surrounding communities include Jabal Ali 3 and Jabal Ali 1. The station is close to a number of bus routes.

== Station layout ==
G	Street level	Exit/Entrance
L1	Mezzanine	Automatic Fare Collection gates, station agent, crossover
L2	Side platform | Doors will open on the right
L2	Platform 2 Southbound	Towards ← Life Pharmacy; Next Station: Danube
L2	Platform 1 Northbound	Towards → Centrepoint; Next Station: Ibn Battuta
L2	Side platform | Doors will open on the right
