= Jebel Ali Village =

Jebel Ali Village قرية جبل علي
- Community
- St. Francis of Assisi Catholic Church at the Churches Complex, Jebel Ali Village

- Location within Dubai, UAE Jebel Ali Village (United Arab Emirates)
- Coordinates: 25.034937°N 55.117054°E
- Country: United Arab Emirates
- Emirate: Dubai
- City: Dubai
- Jebel Ali Village: 1977

Jebel Ali Village (JAV) is a neighbourhood in Jebel Ali, southern Dubai, United Arab Emirates. With the original houses being demolished in 2022, luxury villas are currently being constructed by Nakheel Properties in the same area. There are several places of worship located here, including the Churches Complex.

== History ==
The original Jebel Ali Village was constructed in 1977 to provide accommodation to construction contractors' staff. At this time, Sheikh Rashid bin Saeed Al Maktoum planned to develop Jebel Ali into an industrial area with its own airport, port, and township. The remoteness from central Dubai meant that Jebel Ali Village had to be self-sufficient, making residents develop a strong attachment to the area, even after they had left. Jebel Ali Village was effectively a small British-style garden city. It was a project of Sir William Halcrow and Partners and acted as a prototype for further semi-autonomous residential areas in Dubai such as Emirates Hills and The Gardens.

Construction for the redevelopment of Jebel Ali village had begun by 2008 and was originally expected to be completed by 2013. The existing villas were to be demolished to give space for new ones. Jebel Ali Village upon completion was planned to include commercial, community, and retail facilities, and the expansion of the existing central park to 12 hectares. However, the project was put on hold due to the 2008 financial crisis and the Great Recession, which affected Dubai severely. Instead, Nakheel announced in 2013 that the company intended to renovate the existing villas.

In 2021, it was announced that Jebel Ali Village was to be transformed to make way for luxury villas. The existing tenants were given a year to move, with eviction notices served on them. There are plans for redevelopment with villas. The villas are currently under construction and are expected to be complete in 2026. In 2019, Wasl constructed townhouses in the area next to the Churches Complex, known as Gardenia Townhomes. Phase two of the project was sold out in 2023.

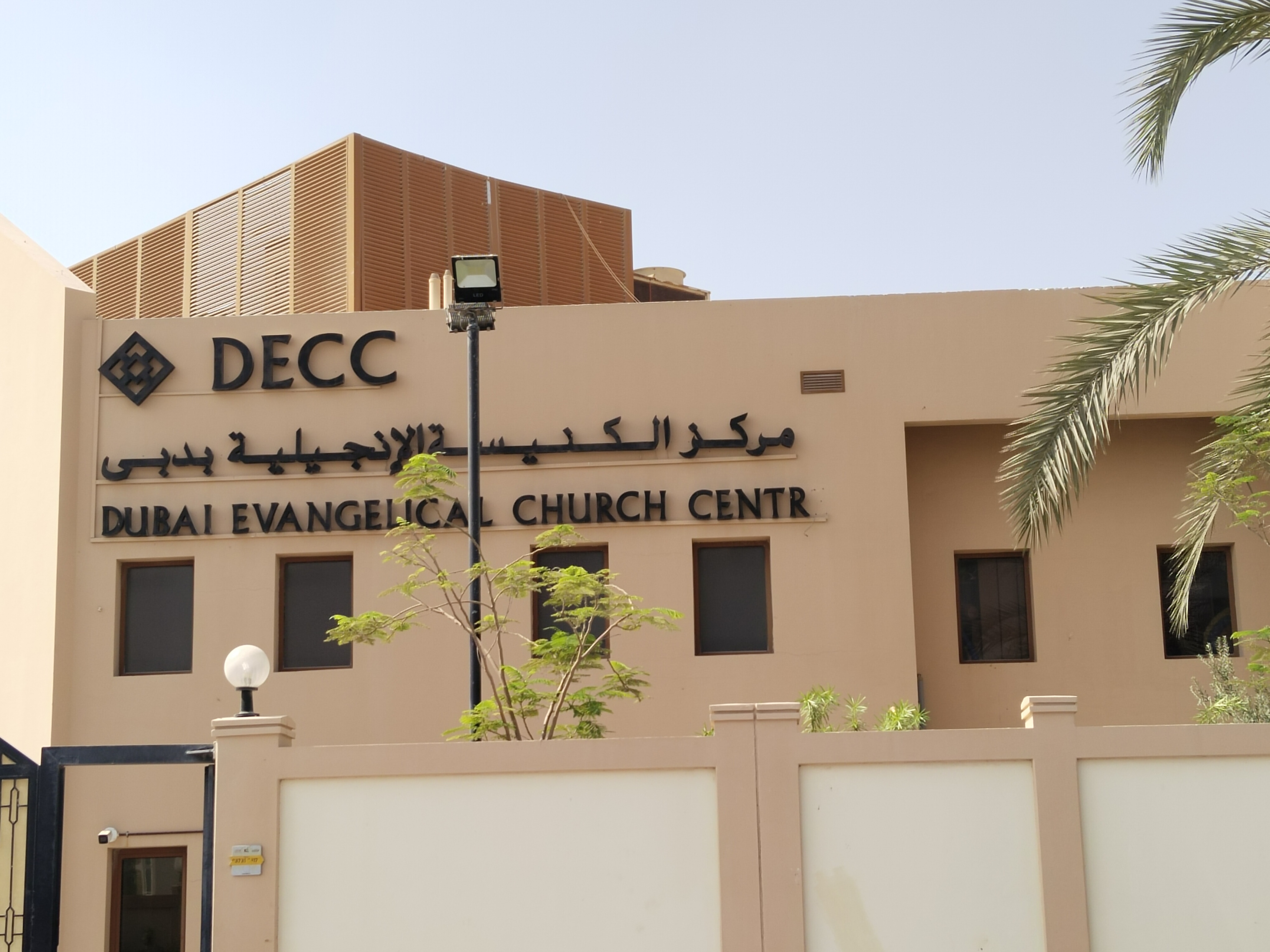
Dubai Evangelical Church Centre (DECC), Jebel Ali Village

== Location ==
To the north are The Gardens and Discovery Gardens. To the east is Al Furjan. To the south is the Jebel Ali Industrial area. The Ibn Battuta Mall and the Ibn Battuta metro station on the Red Line of the Dubai Metro are close by, to the northwest.

Churches Complex is located here, immediately south of the Al Muntazah residential complex.

== Churches Complex ==
The Churches Complex in Jebel Ali Village, is an area for a number of churches and temples of different religious denominations, especially Christian denominations.

Churches and temples in the complex include:

- St Francis of Assisi Catholic Church
- Christ Church Jebel Ali Anglican Church
- Dubai Evangelical Church Centre (DECC)
- St Mina Coptic Orthodox Church
- The Mar Thoma Parish Church
- Mor Ignatius Jacobite Syrian Orthodox Cathedral
- Archdiocese Of Roum Orthodox Church
- Gurunanak Darbar Dubai Sikh Gurudwara
- Hindu Temple, Dubai

== See also ==
- Churches Complex
- Developments in Dubai
