= Wasl (company) =

Real estate company based in Dubai

- Company type: Semi-government company
- Industry: Real estate management and development
- Founded: May 25, 2008; 18 years ago
- Founder: Dubai Real Estate Corporation
- Headquarters: Dubai, UAE
- Subsidiaries: Wasl Properties, Wasl Hospitality & Leisure, Dubai Golf
- Website: www.wasl.ae/en

Wasl (Arabic: وصل, lit. 'connection') is a semi-government real estate management and development company based in Dubai, United Arab Emirates. It is one of the largest real-estate development and management companies in Dubai.

== History ==
Wasl is a semi-government entity established on May 25, 2008, by the Dubai Real Estate Corporation (DREC) to oversee the development and management of its assets. It was created following the merger of two public sector organisations: Dubai Development Board and Real Estate Department.

Sheikh Maktoum Bin Mohammed Bin Rashid Al Maktoum, deputy ruler of Dubai, deputy prime minister and minister of finance was named chairman of Wasl. Hesham Abdulla Al Qassim was appointed vice chairman and chief executive officer. In 2017 Wasl entered into a joint venture with the Dubai Integrated Economic Zones Authority to develop Dubai CommerCity.

In 2021, Sheikh Mohammed bin Rashid Al Maktoum, Vice President and Prime Minister of the UAE and Ruler of Dubai, announced Food Tech Valley, a UAE-government-led global food security initiative. Wasl is developing the project in partnership with the UAE's Ministry of Climate Change and Environment.

== Subsidiaries ==
=== Wasl Properties ===
Wasl Asset Management Group established Wasl Properties in 2008. At the time of inception, Wasl Properties had 25,000 residential and commercial properties within older areas of Dubai city, including Deira, Bur Dubai, Al Karama, Muhaisnah, Al Barsha, Jumeirah, Al Wasl, Jebel Ali, Al Quoz and Ras Al Khor.

In 2014, Wasl entered Dubai's freehold real estate sector with the Hyatt Regency Creek Heights project, which consists of two towers.

The company develops residential, commercial and mixed use projects across Dubai, including Wasl Gardenia, Wasl Village, Tiara United Towers, Wasl Green Park, Wasl Gate, Wasl1, seven community malls across Dubai: Dar Wasl, Wasl Vita, Wasl51, Wasl Port Views, Wasl Square, and more.
