= St. Francis of Assisi Catholic Church, Jebel Ali =

Catholic Church in Dubai, United Arab Emirates

Church of St. Francis of Assisi
- كنيسة القديس فرنسيس الأسيزي الكاثوليكية
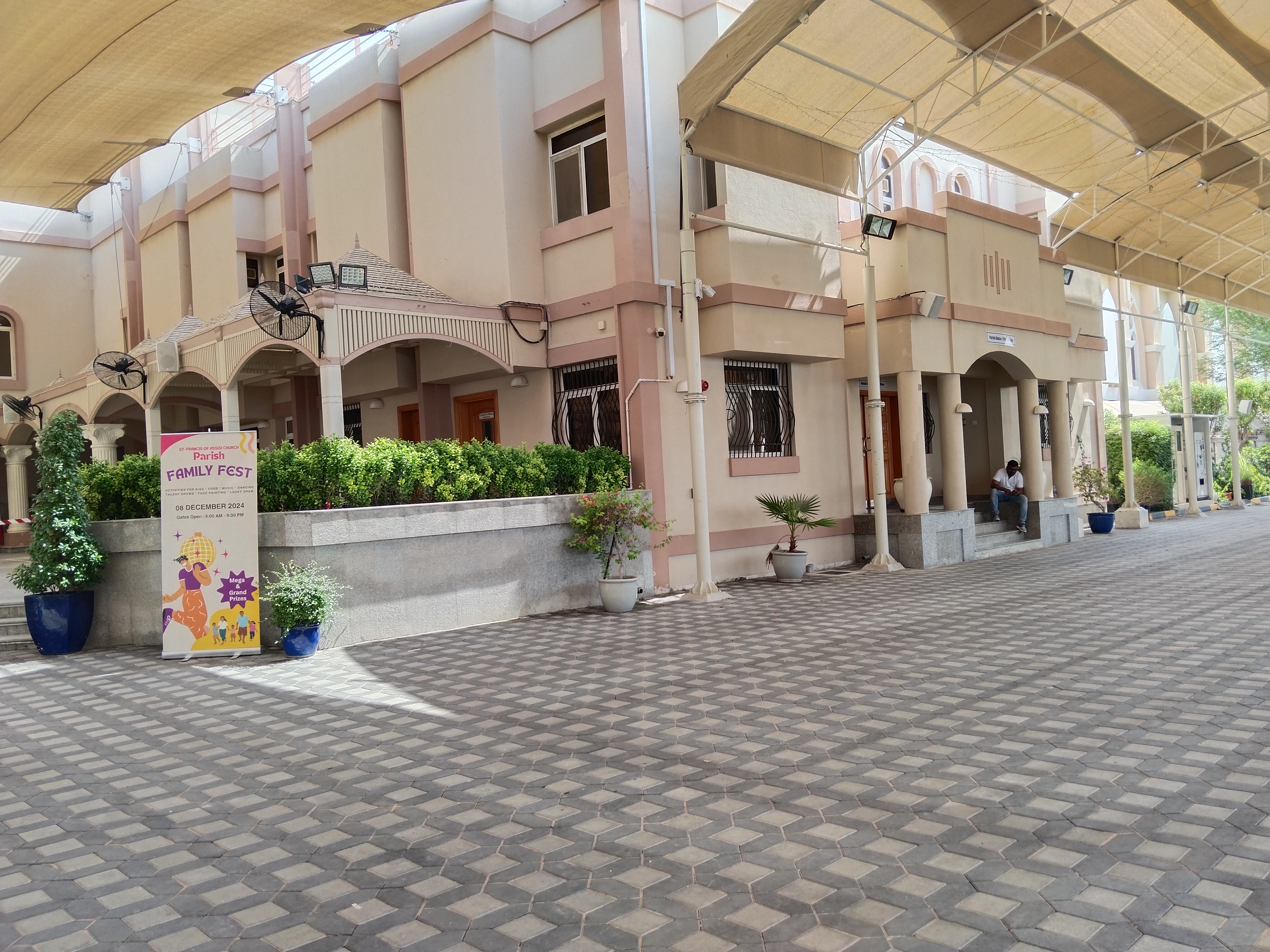
- View of the church building
- Church of St. Francis of Assisi
- 25.02591°N 55.11350°E
- Location: Churches Complex, Jebel Ali Village, Dubai
- Country: United Arab Emirates
- Denomination: Catholic Church
- Sui iuris church: Latin Church
- Website: sfacja.org

History
- Founded: 4 October 2000
- Dedicated: 15 November 2001

Architecture
- Years built: 2000–1
- Completed: 2001

Clergy
- Bishop(s): Paolo Martinelli, OFM Cap.
- Rector: Fr. Antony P. A.

Jebel Ali Church or Church of St. Francis of Assisi (Arabic: كنيسة القديس فرنسيس الأسيزي الكاثوليكية) is a Roman Catholic church in the Churches Complex, Jebel Ali Village, Dubai, United Arab Emirates.

== Overview ==
The church was inaugurated in November 2001 as part of the Vicariate of Arabia, presently pastored by Bishop Paul Hinder. Residents of the parish are of many nationalities from around the world, living mainly as expatriates in Dubai. The church is situated just off Sheikh Zayed Road in Jebel Ali. The original Jebel Ali is situated on a small mountain in the desert. The name itself means ‘Little Mountain’. It is easily accessible from The Gardens/Ibn Battuta Mall and from the Jebel Ali Village interchanges.

== History ==
The Church of St. Francis of Assisi was in the territory of St. Mary’s Church, Dubai, where the Rev. Fr. Daniel Cerofolini OFM Cap was the parish priest. He blessed and laid the foundation stone on 4 October 2000. The construction of the entire church building was done within a period of one year. The church was consecrated on 15 November 2001 by Archbishop Giuseppe de Andrea, the Apostolic Delegate of Arabian Peninsula. Almost 3,000 people took part in the ceremony.

The following are the priests who have served the St. Francis of Assisi Parish in Jebel Ali since it came into existence:

- Bishop Bernard Gremoli
- Fr. Daniel Cerofolini
- Fr. John Fernandaz
- Fr. Ani Xavier
- Fr. Wilson Pascal
- Fr. Conrad D'Souza
- Fr. Thomas Quadros
- Fr. Johnson K. Joseph
- Bishop Paul Hinder
- Fr. Warnakulasuriya Anthony Fernando
- Fr. Peter Kadamankod
- Fr. Eugene Mattioli

The parish land area is 50,000 ft^{2}. It comprises a single building of three parts. The church is adjoined by the Assisi Parish Hall. There is also a systematically constructed Padua Centre with 15 halls, which can be used for catechesis and prayer meetings. The residential area and the office are another part of the construction. The plan and the architecture also provide basement parking spaces for 70 cars.

The mosaic picture of St. Francis embracing Jesus from the Cross decorates the sanctuary of the Church.

This is the second Church within the Emirate of Dubai which began to serve the spiritual needs of Christians living in Jebel Ali Free Zone, Al Quoz Industrial Area, Jebel Ali Industrial Area, Jebel Ali Village, The Gardens, and Jumeirah.

== See also ==
- Churches Complex
- Vicariate Apostolic of Arabia
- Roman Catholicism in the United Arab Emirates
