= Jebel Ali =

Community in Dubai

Jebel Ali جبل علي
- City
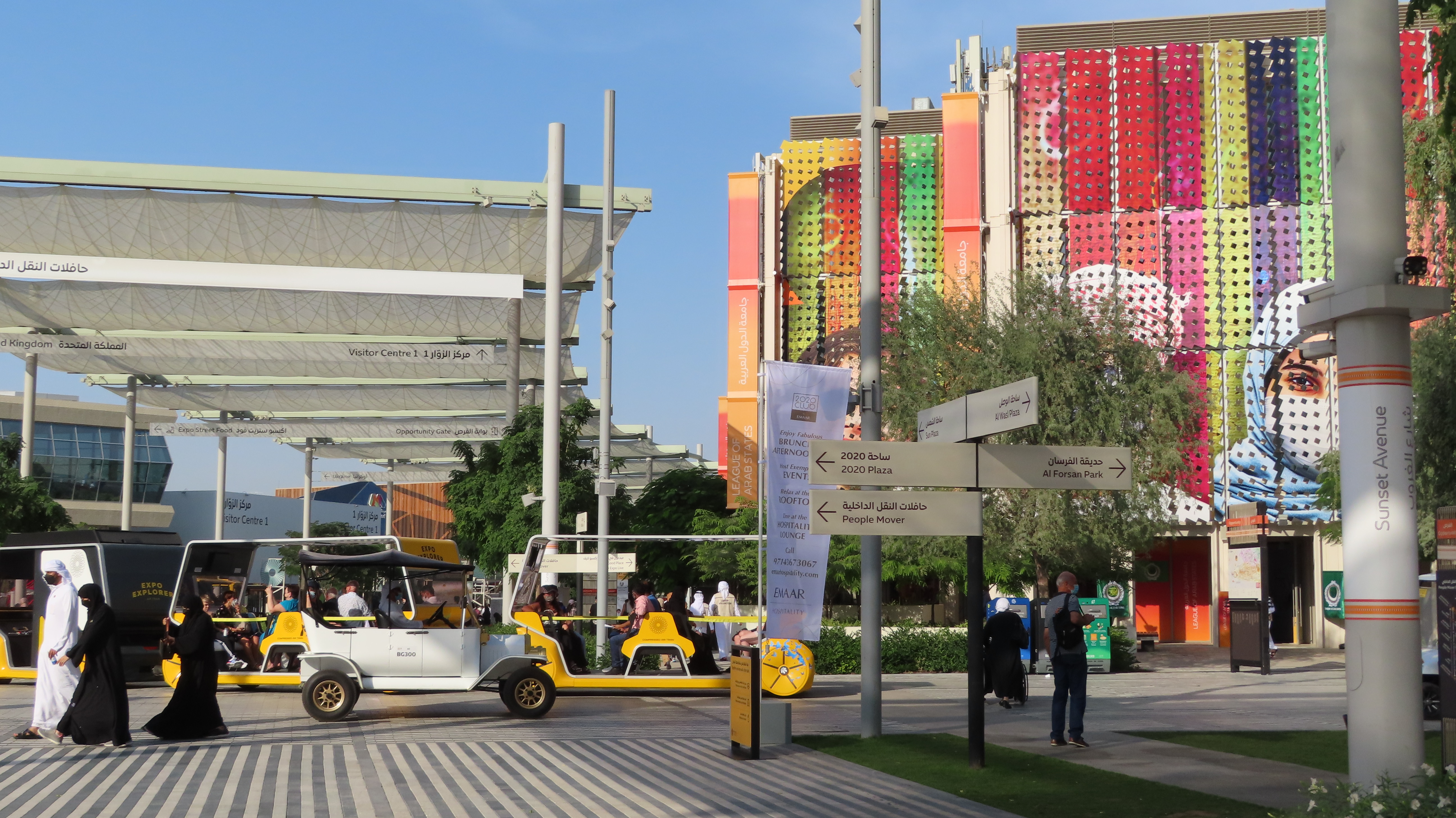
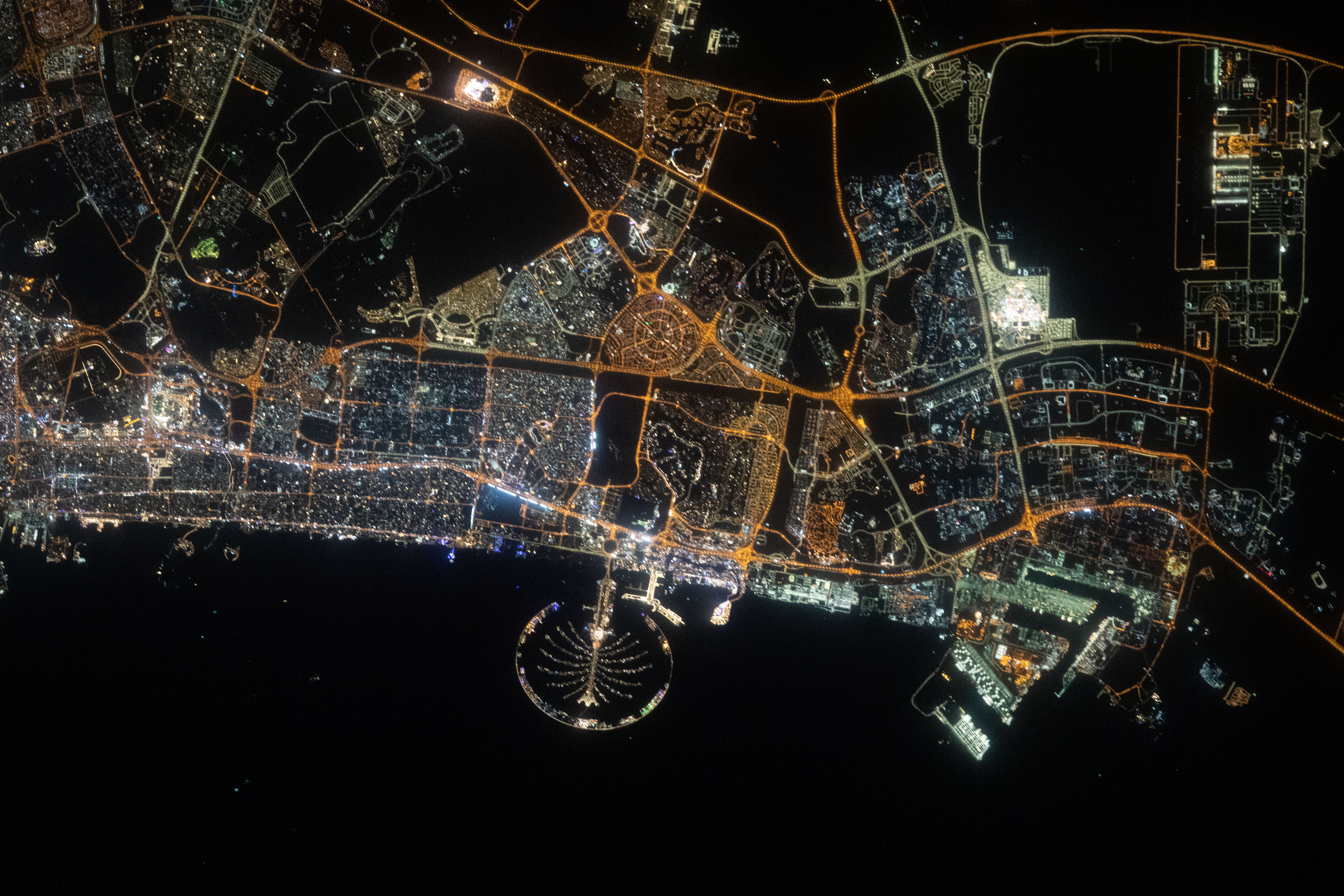
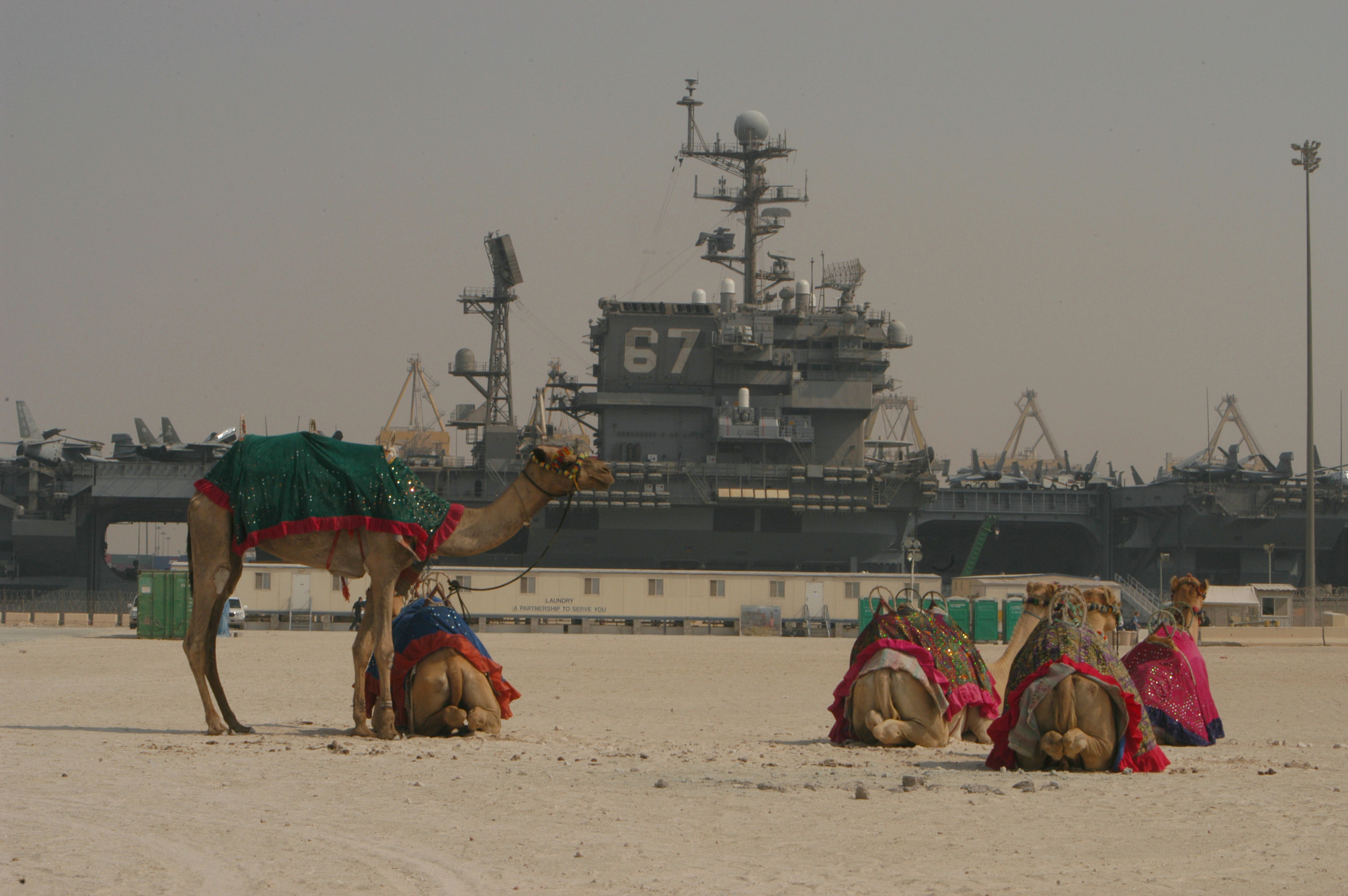
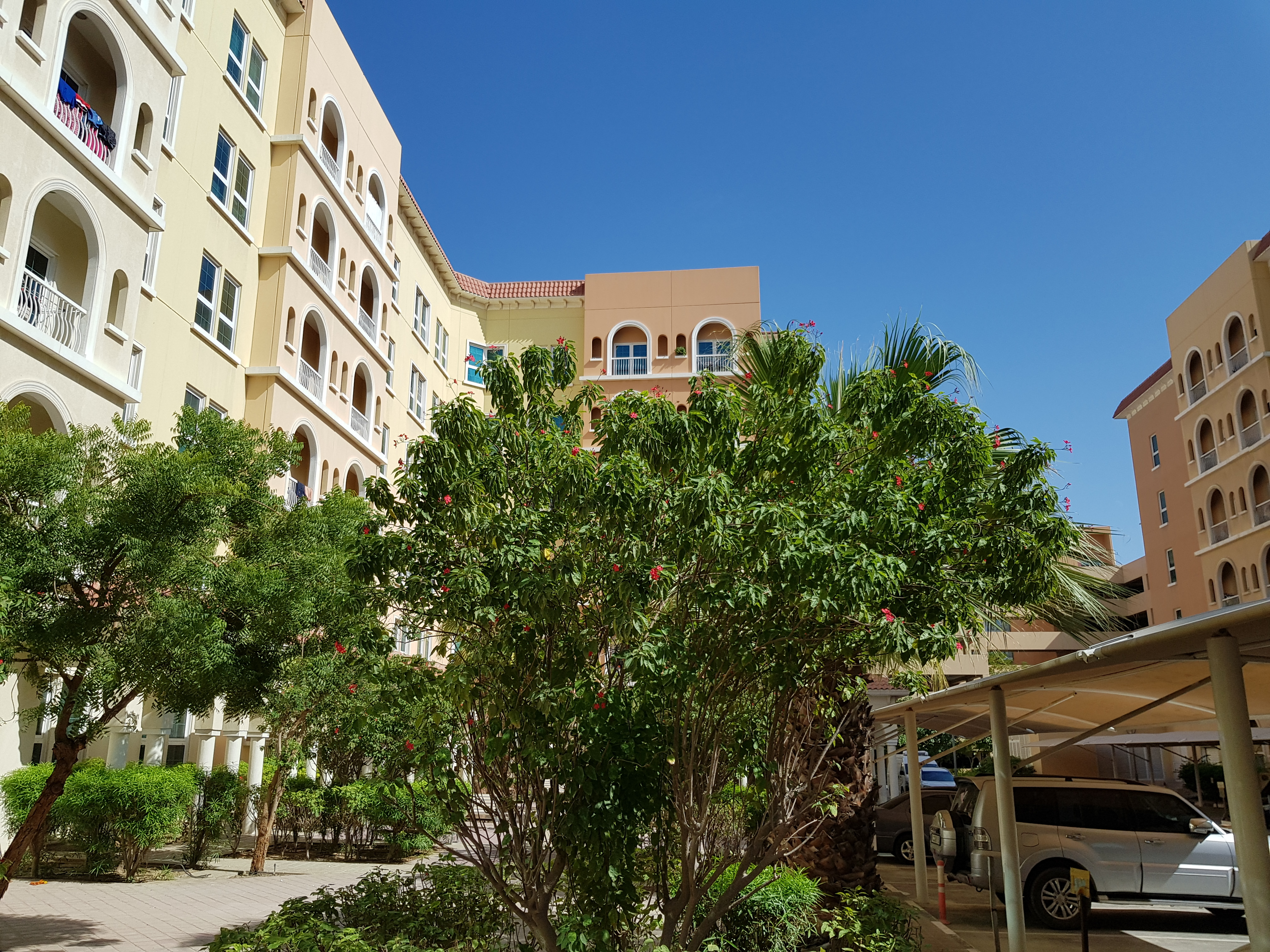
- Clockwise, from top: Expo City, Jebel Ali from the ISS, US Navy at Jebel Ali Port, and Dubai Investment Park
- Interactive map of Jebel Ali
- Coordinates: 25.01126°N 55.06116°E
- Country: United Arab Emirates
- Emirate: Dubai
- Established: 1977

Area
  - Total: 1,057 km^{2} (408 sq mi)

Population (2024)
  - Total: 540,732
  - Density: 511.6/km^{2} (1,325/sq mi)
- Community number: 501-599

Jebel Ali (Arabic: جبل علي) is a major port city located within the Emirate of Dubai, United Arab Emirates, approximately 35 kilometres (22 mi) southwest of the city of Dubai. Situated along the southern coast of the Persian Gulf, it serves as one of the UAE's most significant industrial and logistical hubs. Off its coast lies the artificial archipelago Palm Jebel Ali, one of several palm-shaped islands developed by Nakheel as part of Dubai's coastal expansion projects. The area also encompasses Expo City Dubai, the legacy site of Expo 2020, and Dubai Investment Park, a mixed-use complex that includes industrial, commercial, and residential zones. As of 2024, it has a total population of 540,732.

Initially a sparsely inhabited coastal area, Jebel Ali was developed in the 1970s as part of a state-directed initiative to diversify Dubai's economy beyond oil. It is the site of the Port of Jebel Ali, the largest man-made harbor in the world and the busiest port in the Middle East by container volume. The port is operated by DP World and serves as a major regional transshipment and cargo handling hub.

Adjacent to the port is the Jebel Ali Free Zone (JAFZA), established in 1985 to attract foreign investment through regulatory and tax incentives. As of recent years, JAFZA hosts over 8,700 companies from more than 100 countries and contributes approximately 23 percent of Dubai's gross domestic product, with a particular emphasis on non-oil sectors.

The area includes several large-scale infrastructure installations, including the Jebel Ali Power and Desalination Complex, one of the largest combined power and water facilities in the world. It also houses Emirates Global Aluminium, a major aluminum smelter, along with oil storage and bunkering terminals, warehousing complexes, and labor accommodations. Jebel Ali is connected to regional and international transport networks via Sheikh Zayed Road (E11), the Dubai Metro Red Line, and Al Maktoum International Airport, located in the adjacent Dubai South district.

== History ==
Many Arab historians argue that it was named after Ali, who was the cousin and son-in-law of Muhammad while expanding the Islamic Caliphate had stood on one hill and looked towards the sea and perhaps known as well although no such recorded proof has been found. "Jebel" means mountain or hill in Arabic.

In 1968, Overseas AST started construction of Dubai's first Communications Station in the Jebal Ali area, because of the raised ground. It was commissioned in 1970, giving for the first time telecommunication links with the rest of the world. In the 1970s, Sheikh Rashid bin Saeed Al Maktoum planned to develop Jebel Ali into an industrial area with its own airport, port, and township.

On 23 September 1983, Gulf Air Flight 771 crashed in Jebel Ali killing all 112 people on board. The cause of the crash was a terrorist bomb that had been planted onboard the aircraft by the Abu Nidal Organization.

== Population and Organization ==
Jebel Ali is Sector 5 of the Emirate of Dubai and is split into 18 communities. According to the Dubai Statistics Centre, as of 2024, it has a total population of 540,732.

Community	Population	Area km^{2}	Community Code
Jebel Ali 1	86,402	21.3	591
Jebel Ali 2	1,032	5.1	592
Jebel Ali 3	418	365	593
Jebel Ali Industrial 1	200,309	22.1	599
Jebel Ali Industrial 2	33,071	32.6	518
Jebel Ali Industrial 3	0	30	516
Palm Jebel Ali	5	58.1	501
Port Jebel Ali	12,700	34.8	594
Hessyan 1	3,885	23.8	511
Hessyan 2	11,828	53.3	512
Saih Shuaib 1	2,307	48.2	513
Saih Shuaib 2	13,711	26.1	531
Saih Shuaib 3	5,084	16.1	532
Saih Shuaib 4	11,811	19.4	533
Dubai Investment Park 1	63,392	17.2	598
Dubai Investment Park 2	78,580	18.8	597
Madinat Al Mataar	16,193	141.8	521
Al Wajeha Al Bahriah	4	123.4	502
Jebel Ali	540,732	1,057	(Sector 5)

== Jebel Ali Free Zone ==
In 1985, the Jebel Ali Free Zone (JAFZA) was created: an industrial area surrounding the port. International companies that relocate there enjoy the special privileges of the free zone. These include exemption from corporate tax for 50 years, no personal income tax, no import or re-export duties, no restriction on currency, and easy labor supply and recruitment from authorized companies.

== Jebel Ali Industrial Area ==
Jebel Ali Industrial Area (aka Jebel Ali Industrial) is one of Dubai's oldest industrial districts. It is located east of the Port of Jebel Ali, south of Jebel Ali Village, west of Dubai Investments Park, and north of the Jebel Ali Free Zone Extension. There have been a number of industrial fires in the area.

== Port of Jebel Ali ==
Jebel Ali was opened in 1979 at the decree of Sheikh Rashid bin Saeed Al Maktoum and inaugurated by Queen Elizabeth II. The port is confirmed to be the most trusted destination for dockings of United States Navy ships in the Persian Gulf. Due to the depth of the harbour and size of the port facilities, a Nimitz-class aircraft carrier and several ships of the accompanying strike group can be accommodated pierside. Due to the frequency of these port visits, semi-permanent shore-leave facilities (referred to by US Navy service personnel as "The Sandbox") have been erected adjacent to the carrier berth.

== Jebel Ali Village ==
The original Jebel Ali Village (JAV) was constructed in 1977 to provide accommodation to construction contractors' staff involved with the development of Jebel Ali. Jebel Ali Village was effectively a small British-style garden city. It was a project of Sir William Halcrow and Partners and acted as a prototype for further semi-autonomous residential areas in Dubai such as Emirates Hills and The Gardens. In 2021, residents were given notice to vacate the properties and demolition commenced in 2022. Construction for luxury villas in the area is underway by Nakheel Properties.

== Places of Worship ==
Jebel Ali Village has a significant number of churches, mosques and temples of different religious denominations, especially Christian denominations.

Churches and temples in the complex include:

- St Francis of Assisi Catholic Church
- Christ Church Jebel Ali Anglican Church.
- Dubai Evangelical Church Centre (DECC)
- St Mina Copts Orthodox Church
- The Mar Thoma Parish church
- Mor Ignatius Jacobite Syrian Orthodox Cathedral
- Archdiocese Of Roum Orthodox Church
- Gurunanak Darbar Dubai Sikh Temple
- Hindu Temple, Jebel Ali

== Palm Jebel Ali ==
Palm Jebel Ali (نخلة جبل علي) is an artificial archipelago in Dubai, United Arab Emirates which began construction in October 2002, was originally planned to be completed by mid-2008 and has been on hold since. Creative Kingdom provided master planning services for the island and Leisure Quest International (USA) developed entertainment and attraction concepts. The project, which is 50 percent larger than Palm Jumeirah, is proposed to include six marinas, a water theme park, 'Sea Village', homes built on stilts above the water, and boardwalks that circle the "fronds" of the "palm" and spell out an Arabic poem by Sheikh Mohammed bin Rashid Al Maktoum.

The breakwater was completed in December 2006, and infrastructure work began in April 2007. Major construction will not begin until most of the infrastructure work is complete. Due to the 2008 financial crisis, work was suspended, and the developers, Nakheel, have confirmed no work would take place on the development in the near future.

Nakheel invited several architects to design one of the buildings for the Palm on a 300,000 m^{2} area. The winning design was a building by Royal Haskoning, who also worked on several other projects in Dubai. The residential villas to be built and sold by the developer were designed by Serendipity By Design LLC, a firm based in Dubai, United Arab Emirates. The villa types were to be categorised by size and style; 40 series (the largest), garden villas and signature villas.

In the first signs of a slowing Dubai property market, the prices of properties being sold on Palm Jebel Ali were reported to have fallen by 40% in the two months to November 2008, due to the 2008 financial crisis. In 2009, the Dubai Land Department investigated complaints into Nakheel stalling the Palm Jebel Ali project. Nakheel offered investors alternative homes in other projects but these were inferior properties. In March 2011 Nakheel offered refunds to property investors. Palm Jebel Ali's developer planned to house more than 250,000 people on it.

In the original schedule, by 2021, the first phase of four theme parks would have opened on the Crescent. These planned parks, which together will be called "World of Discovery," will be developed and operated by the Busch Entertainment Corporation. The parks include SeaWorld, Aquatica, Busch Gardens and Discovery Cove. The World of Discovery will be located at the top of the Crescent, which will form into the shape of an orca (reminiscent of Shamu). In 2013, State news agency WAM said a decree by ruler Sheikh Mohammed bin Rashid al Maktoum said a special legal committee would be established over the building bubble. This included using funds following liquidation of scores of cancelled building projects to repay investors who lost billions in the Emirates property market. It was suggested that this would settle disputes related to projects that had been officially cancelled by the Real Estate Regulatory Authority (RERA).

In November 2014, 74 owners on Palm Jebel Ali wrote to the Ruler of Dubai via the Ruler's Court regarding the stalled PJA project. On 16 March 2015, Nakheel Chairman Mr. Ali Lootah confirmed that Nakheel remains committed to the project long term but asked "what can I do" for original investors.

In October 2018, Sanjay Manchanda, CEO of Nakheel, confirmed that there are no immediate plans to restart development of the project. In July 2021, it was announced that Nakheel planned to restart the project by considering plans involving building villas on the island. In April 2022, reports began to circulate that Nakheel had petitioned the Dubai courts and secured a hearing in the absence of investors (as no notice given) to secure a judgement to formally cancel the Palm Jebel Ali project, which was apparently granted on 19 May 2022. Consequently 724 previous villa contracts were made null and void as per the judgement, with the aim to return only the original investment, without recognition of any secondary market transaction premium paid, or compensation as per the clause in the Nakheel property contract (Sales Purchase Agreement. Furthermore, no consideration was given to opportunity cost, including potential return on investment, such as compound interest which could have generated substantial gains.

In September 2022, Nakheel announced a rebranding exercise. Soon after, it revealed its plans to relaunch Palm Jebel Ali. It has been reported in the Wall Street Journal that high vaccination rates and zero taxes is making Dubai a pandemic boom town, with many wealthy Russians expected to move there, now access to Western property has become significantly more challenging with International bans and enhanced anti-money laundering laws. Recently, it was revealed that Nakheel is nearing completion of $4.6 billion of debt restructuring to relaunch its landmark projects. "Nakheel is paying a lower spread and getting more money for new projects, including Palm Jebel Ali," stated one banker on the deal. Nakheel plans to build 1,700 villas and 6,000 apartments.

== See also ==
- Jebel Ali Seaplane Base
- Jebel Ali refinery
- Jabal Ali (Dubai Metro)
