= The Amazing Race Australia 4 =

- Season 4
- Presented by: Beau Ryan
- No. of teams: 11
- Winners: Tim & Rod Sattler-Jones
- No. of legs: 12
- Distance traveled: 45,000 km (28,000 mi)
- No. of episodes: 12

Release
- Original network: Network 10
- Original release: 28 October – 3 December 2019

Additional information
- Filming dates: 20 August – 12 September 2019

Series chronology
- ← Previous; Australia v New Zealand (on Seven Network) Next → Season 5

The Amazing Race Australia 4 is the fourth season of The Amazing Race Australia, an Australian reality competition show based on the American series The Amazing Race. This season was the first to air on Network 10 after moving from Seven Network and was hosted by former rugby league footballer Beau Ryan, who replaced Grant Bowler. It featured eleven teams of two, each with a pre-existing relationship, in a race across the world to win the grand prize of A$250,000.

This season visited three continents and eight countries and travelled over 45,000 kilometres (28,000 mi) during twelve legs. Starting in Seoul, racers travelled through South Korea, Vietnam, Mongolia, Zambia, Zimbabwe, Malawi and Thailand before returning to Australia and finishing in Nitmiluk National Park. New elements introduced in this season include an international start. The season premiered on Monday, 28 October 2019, with the show airing on Mondays and Tuesdays in the 7:30 p.m. timeslot on Network 10, and concluded on 3 December 2019.

Newlyweds Tim and Rod Sattler-Jones were the winners of this season, while married Aboriginal couple Jasmin Onus and Jerome Cubillo finished in second place and siblings Viv and Joey Dinh finished in third place.

== Production ==
=== Development and filming ===
Teams gathered at Seoul Plaza near Seoul City Hall to start The Amazing Race Australia 4.

In May 2019, rumours circulated that The Amazing Race Australia would return after five years when casting opened for an "Adventure Travel Competition" to be produced by Eureka Productions that was "looking for personality-packed teams of two to take part in a competitive reality travel series full of great prizes to be won!" On 29 May 2019, Beverley McGarvey, the chief content officer of Network 10, announced that the network was in the process of acquiring two franchises that would air at the end of the year saying, "We are doing The Masked Singer, which is different, a bit crazy and a proper original. The other thing, a franchise I can't talk about yet, will be huge for us too. We are finalising the contract at present," and described the second franchise they were acquiring as "a bit more familiar."

The next day, TV Blackbox reported that CBS Studios International had bought the rights to the Australian franchise of The Amazing Race with the series set to air in the final quarter of 2019. On 27 June, Network 10 officially announced that it would be reviving The Amazing Race Australia with Beverley McGarvey announcing that a new series was set to air in late 2019 and that Beau Ryan would be serving as the new host.

The racecourse for this season travelled to eight countries across three continents (Asia, Africa and Oceania), racing 45,000 km in total. The season started outside of Australia at Seoul Plaza in Seoul, South Korea, making it the first time for the Australian series where the starting line was not located in the show's host country. This season also included first-time visits to South Korea, Mongolia, Zambia, Zimbabwe and Malawi.

=== Casting ===
Applications for the fourth season opened in May 2019 and were open to permanent residents and citizens from Australia and New Zealand, who were at least 18 years old. Applications for the 2019 edition were originally set to close on 31 May 2019 but were extended to 7 July 2019.

== Release ==
=== Broadcast ===
On 3 September, during an episode of Australian Survivor, it was first revealed that The Amazing Race Australia would begin airing in October. The premiere date was later announced on 7 October after cast announcements began to be 28 October 2019.

=== Marketing ===
Bankwest served as the major sponsor of this season, providing multiple leg prizes as well as Halo payment rings as a primary means of payment during many legs. Other sponsors included Tourism NT, Jetstar and Powerade Active Water.

== Cast ==
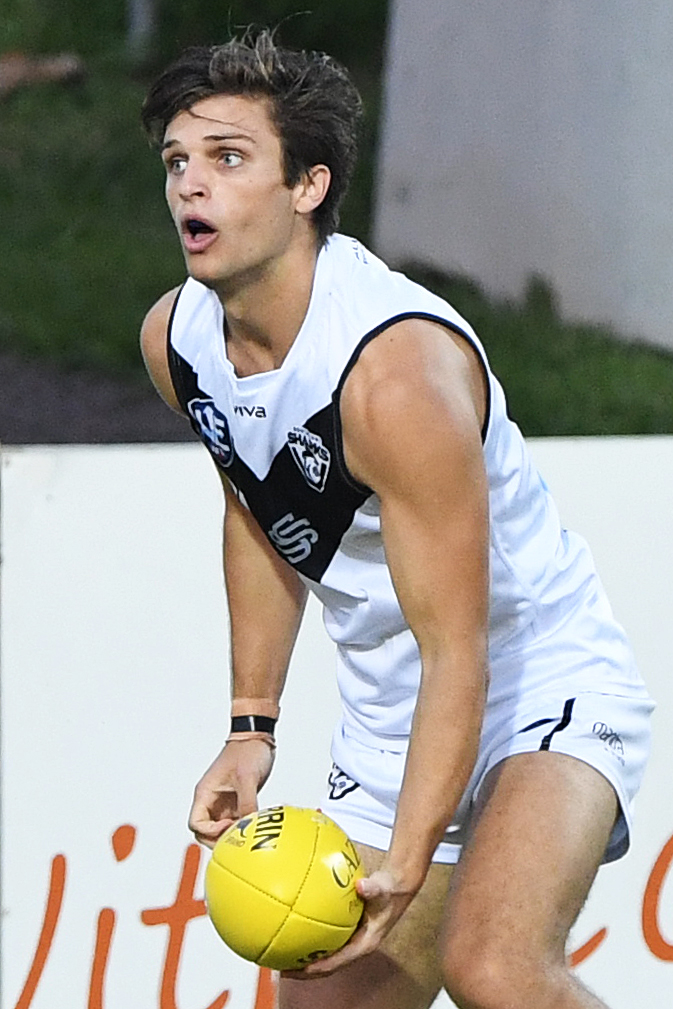
Tyler Roos

The cast included North Melbourne rookie Tom Wilkinson would be racing with Southport midfielder Tyler Roos, the son of Australian Football Hall of Fame inductee Paul Roos, which was leaked prior to the start of filming. It also included two Missionaries of God's Love sisters, the first female firefighter in South Australia Adrienne Clarke, the show's first married Indigenous couple and the show's first same-sex married couple following legalisation of same-sex marrage in Australia.

Contestants	Age	Relationship	Hometown	Status
Alana Pappas	21	Gen Z Siblings	Adelaide, South Australia	Eliminated 1st (in Seoul, South Korea)
Niko Pappas	19	Gen Z Siblings	Adelaide, South Australia	Eliminated 1st (in Seoul, South Korea)
Judy Bowe	53	Nuns	Canberra, Australian Capital Territory	Eliminated 2nd (in Cheorwon, South Korea)
Therese Mills	45	Nuns	Canberra, Australian Capital Territory	Eliminated 2nd (in Cheorwon, South Korea)
Rowah Hassan	42	Mum & Daughter	Sydney, New South Wales	Eliminated 3rd (in Gia Viễn, Vietnam)
Amani Mawass	18	Mum & Daughter	Sydney, New South Wales	Eliminated 3rd (in Gia Viễn, Vietnam)
Chris Williams	58	Farmer and Firie	Mount Compass, South Australia	Medically removed (in Govi-Altai, Mongolia)
Adrienne Clarke	59	Farmer and Firie	Mount Compass, South Australia	Medically removed (in Govi-Altai, Mongolia)
Hayley Foruria	29	Sisters	Townsville, Queensland	Eliminated 5th (in Ulaanbataar, Mongolia)
Mikayla Foruria	24	Sisters	Cairns, Queensland	Eliminated 5th (in Ulaanbataar, Mongolia)
Sid Pierucci	26	The Influencers	Bondi, New South Wales	Eliminated 6th (in Victoria Falls, Zimbabwe)
Ash Ruscoe	30	The Influencers	Bondi, New South Wales	Eliminated 6th (in Victoria Falls, Zimbabwe)
Femi Ogunsiji	23	Nurses	Sydney, New South Wales	Eliminated 7th (in Lilongwe, Malawi)
Nick Evbuomwan	23	Nurses	Sydney, New South Wales	Eliminated 7th (in Lilongwe, Malawi)
Tom Wilkinson	23	Footy Mates	Melbourne, Victoria	Eliminated 8th (in Bangkok, Thailand)
Tyler Roos	23	Footy Mates	Melbourne, Victoria	Eliminated 8th (in Bangkok, Thailand)
Viv Dinh	25	Mighty Siblings	Melbourne, Victoria	Third place
Joey Dinh	28	Mighty Siblings	Melbourne, Victoria	Third place
Jasmin Onus	30	Deadly Duo	Darwin, Northern Territory	Runners-up
Jerome Cubillo	30	Deadly Duo	Darwin, Northern Territory	Runners-up
Tim Sattler-Jones	29	Newlyweds	Newcastle, New South Wales	Winners
Rod Sattler-Jones	28	Newlyweds	Newcastle, New South Wales	Winners

A month after filming concluded, Sidney "Sid" Pierucci was arrested and charged with assault and destroying/damaging property following an alleged domestic violence incident on 14 October in Bellevue Hill, with police issuing an apprehended domestic violence order on behalf of Ashley "Ash" Ruscoe. After these reports came out, Ash stated in an interview that she and Sid had ended their relationship after filming concluded, although she stated that the show was not the cause of their breakup. Sid pleaded not guilty to the charges on 6 November 2019 at Downing Centre Local Court, but later accepted a plea bargain by pleading guilty to a minor charge in February 2020.

=== Future appearances ===
Jasmin & Jerome appeared during the next season to perform a Welcome to Country ceremony for the teams in Darwin, Northern Territory.

== Results ==
The following teams are listed with their placements in each leg. Placements are listed in finishing order.

- A red placement with a dagger (†) indicates that the team was eliminated.
- An underlined blue placement with a double-dagger (‡) indicates that the team was the last to arrive at a Pit Stop in a non-elimination leg.
- A green ƒ indicates that the team won the Fast Forward.
- A brown ⊃ indicates that the team used the U-Turn and a brown ⊂ indicates the team on the receiving end of the U-Turn.
- A violet + indicates that the teams encountered an Intersection.

Team placement (by leg)
Team	1	2	3	4	5	6	7+ (Note: This leg featured an Intersection. The teams were paired up thusly: Tom & Tyler and Jasmin & Jerome, Tim & Rod and Sid & Ash, and Viv & Joey and Femi & Nick.)	8	9	10 (Note: All five teams had time penalties applied at the Pit Stop based on how many questions they answered incorrectly during the pub quiz task. The initial placements were as follows: 1st: Viv & Joey; 2nd: Tom & Tyler; 3rd: Jasmin & Jerome; 4th: Tim & Rod; and 5th: Femi & Nick.)	11	12
Tim & Rod	4th	4th	3rd	5th	5th	2nd	2nd	2nd	3rd⊂ (Note: In leg 9, the teams voted for the team to be U-Turned; Tim & Rod received the most votes.)	4th	1st	1st
Jasmin & Jerome	6th	5th	4th⊃ (Note: Jasmin & Jerome chose to use the U-Turn on Sid & Ash.)	4thƒ (Note: This team won the Fast Forward on this leg.)	1st	3rd	5th	3rd	2nd	2nd	3rd	2nd
Viv & Joey	2nd	2nd	2nd	7th	7th	5th	3rd	5th	5th‡	3rd	2nd	3rd
Tom & Tyler	1st	1st	1st	1st	2nd	4th	1st	1stƒ	1st	1st	4th†⊂ (Note: In leg 11, the teams voted for the team to be U-Turned; Tom & Tyler received the most votes.)	
Femi & Nick	5th	9th	7th	8th	3rd	6th (Note: Femi & Nick initially arrived 5th, but were issued a 2-hour penalty for failing to complete the sand dune task during the allotted 4-hour time period. Viv & Joey checked in during this penalty time, dropping Femi & Nick to 6th.)	4th	4th	4th	5th†		
Sid & Ash	9th	7th	6th⊂	3rd	4th	1st	6th‡	6th† (Note: Sid & Ash initially arrived 2nd, but were issued a 1-hour penalty for speeding. All of the other remaining teams checked in during this penalty time, dropping Sid & Ash to last.)				
Hayley & Mikayla	3rd	3rd	5th	2nd	6th	7th†						
Chris & Adrienne	7th	6th	8th	6th	8th†							
Rowah & Amani	8th	8th	9th‡	9th†								
Judy & Therese	10th	10th†										
Alana & Niko	11th†											

== Race summary ==
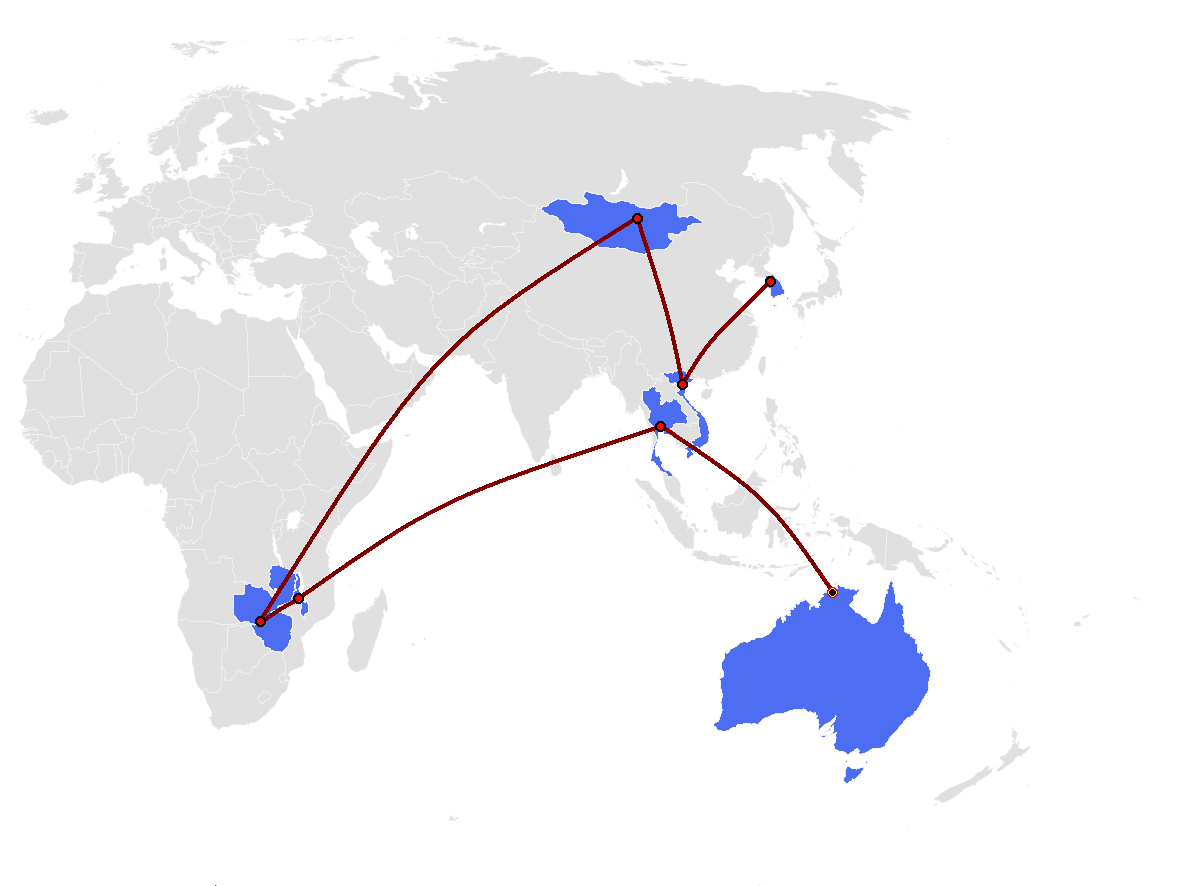
The route of The Amazing Race Australia 4.

Destinations	Air travel Rail travel Water travel Bus travel Helicopter travel Bicycle travel Gondola travel
Route Markers	Detour Roadblock Fast Forward Intersection; U-Turn Speed Bump Pit Stop

=== Leg 1 (South Korea) ===
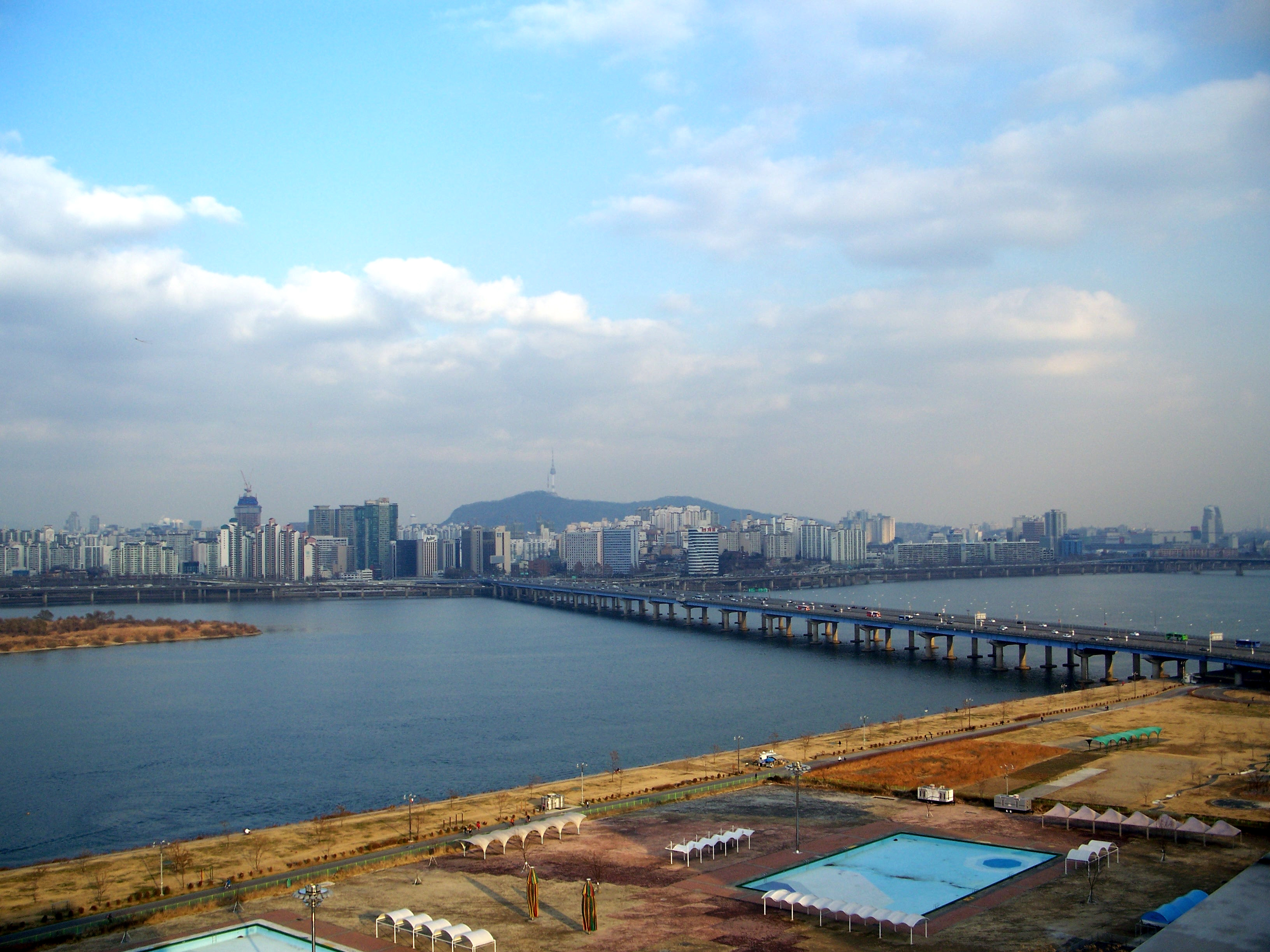
In the Han River off of Yeouido Hangang Park in Seoul, one team member had to ride a Flyboard for the first Roadblock.

- Episode 1 (28 October 2019)
- Eliminated: Alana & Niko

Locations

- Seoul, South Korea (Seoul Plaza) (Starting Line)
- Seoul (Namsan Park – Namsan Tower)
- Seoul (Namsangol Hanok Village – Seoul Millennium Time Capsule)
- Seoul (Yeouido Hangang Park – Han River)
- Seoul (Jongno-gu – Gwangjang Market or Sageun-dong – Hanyang University Gymnasium)
- Seoul (Hoehyeon-dong – Seoullo 7017 Bridge)

Episode summary

- Teams set off from Seoul Plaza in Seoul, South Korea and travelled to Namsan Tower, where they had to search from the observation deck for yellow and red Amazing Race flags in the city below. After finding the flags, teams had to search the gift shop for a postcard that matched the location and contained the address on the back. Teams then had to travel there on foot and find a "message from home" – an inscription from former Premier of New South Wales John Fahey on the Seoul Millennium Time Capsule – in order to find their next clue.
- In this season's first Roadblock, one team member had to ride a Flyboard on the Han River and reach a height of at least two metres (6.6 ft) in order to receive their next clue.
- This season's first Detour was a choice between Fold 'Em Fast or Stack 'Em High. In Fold 'Em Fast, teams had to roll, fill and fold 50 dumplings in order to receive their next clue. In Stack 'Em High, both team members had to take part in sport stacking by stacking twelve cups in a demonstrated formation within eight seconds in order to receive their next clue from Si Eun Kim.
- After the Detour, teams had to check in at the Pit Stop: Seoullo 7017 Bridge.

Additional note

- Alana & Niko fell so far behind that by the time they reached the Roadblock, it had closed for the day and all of the other teams had already checked in at the Pit Stop. Alana & Niko were instructed to go directly to the Pit Stop for elimination.

=== Leg 2 (South Korea) ===
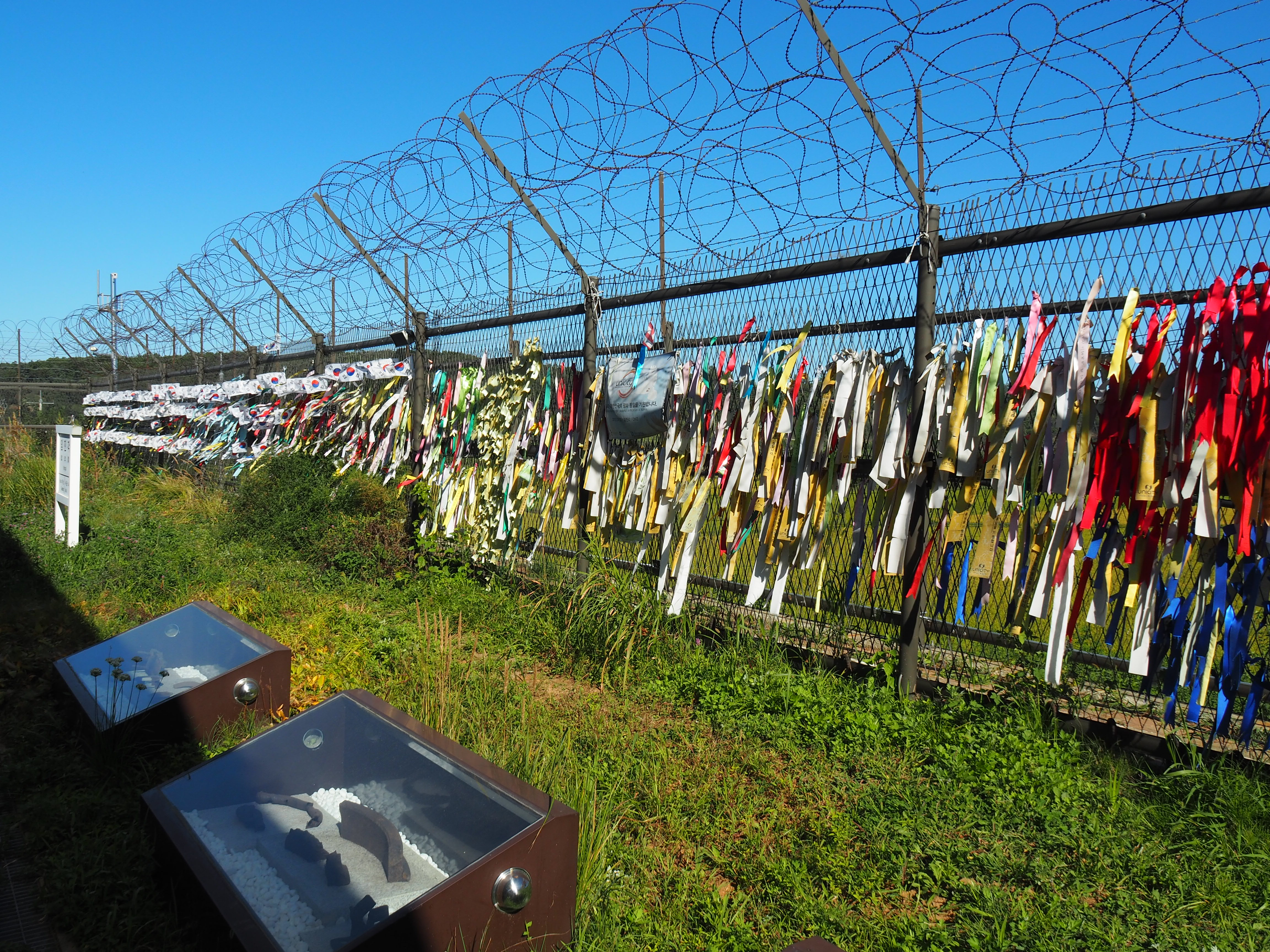
In the second leg, teams travelled into the Korean Demilitarised Zone and hung a prayer ribbon for Korean reunification.

- Episode 2 (29 October 2019)
- Prize: A$1,000 for each contestant, loaded on two Bankwest Halo rings (awarded to Tom & Tyler)
- Eliminated: Judy & Therese

Locations

- Seoul (Cheonggye Plaza – Spring Sculpture)
- Seoul (Gwanghwamun Plaza)
- Paju (Imjingak Peace Park – Prayer Ribbon Fence)
- Cheorwon (Duroowell Bootcamp or Cheorwon Gym)
- Cheorwon (Hantan River – Goseokjeong Pavilion (in Korean))

Episode summary

- At the start of this leg, teams had to count the number of fountains at Gwanghwamun Plaza and give the correct answer to a gardener in order to receive their next clue. Teams were then directed to the Imjingak Peace Park in the Korean Demilitarised Zone, where they had to write a message of hope on a prayer ribbon and tie it to the fence before receiving their next clue.
- This leg's Detour was a choice between All Heart or All Thumbs. In All Heart, teams had to travel to a Korean military boot camp and complete challenges under a drill sergeant that involved carrying two tyres up a steep hill, navigating a high-rope course and crawling through a mud pit with a weighted backpack that contained their next clue. In All Thumbs, teams had to participate in drone soccer at the Cheorwon Gym. Each team member had to pilot a drone through a soccer course and score a goal before receiving their next clue.
- After the Detour, teams had to raft down the Hantan River to the Pit Stop at the Goseokjeong Pavilion.

=== Leg 3 (South Korea → Vietnam) ===
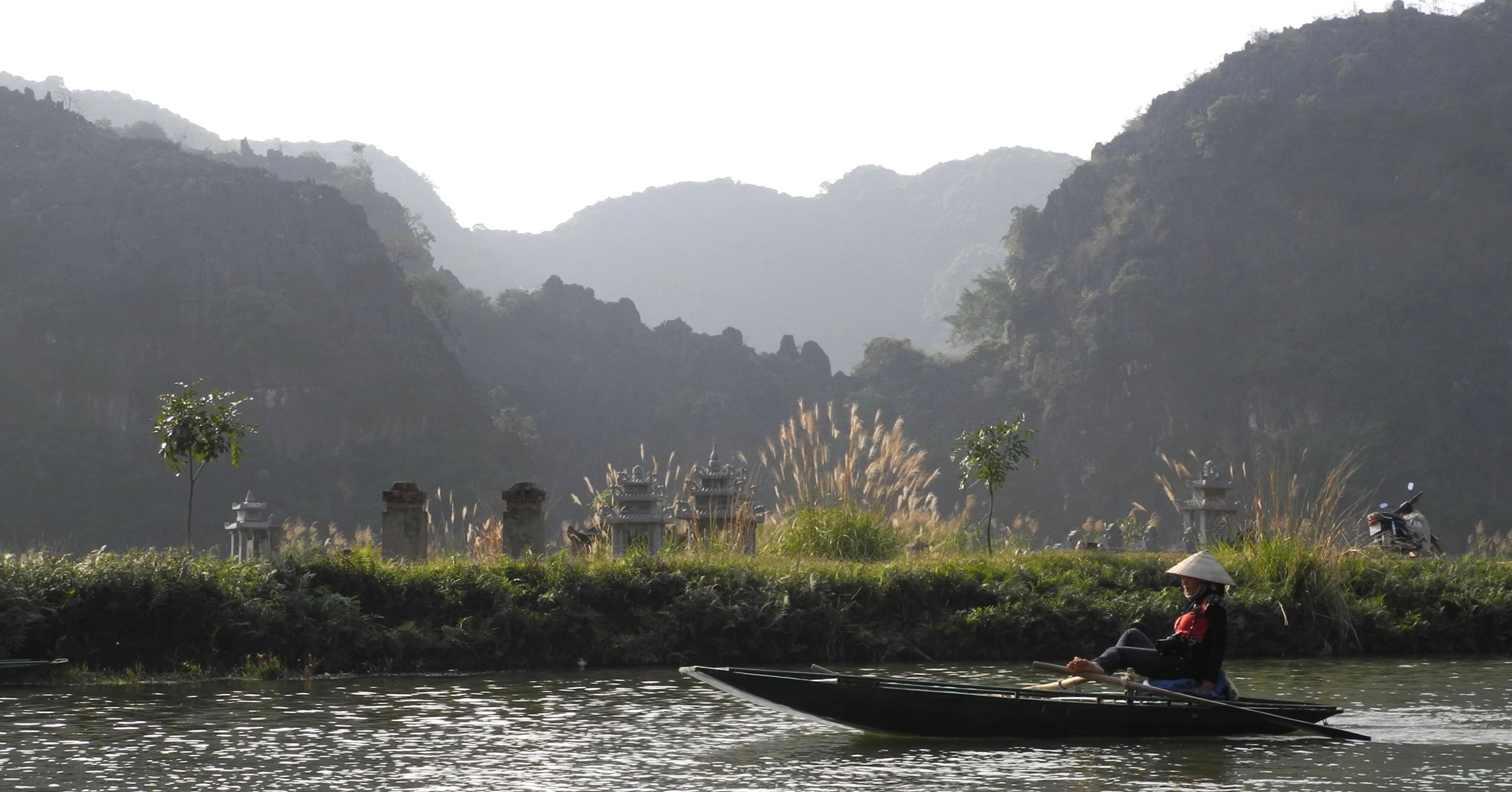
One Detour option in Ninh Bình required teams to row a boat using local methods: with the soles of their feet.

- Episode 3 (4 November 2019)

Locations

- Seoul (Namdaemunno)
- Seoul → Hanoi, Vietnam
- Hanoi (Thang Long Water Puppet Theatre)
- Hanoi (Giáp Bát Bus Station) → Ninh Bình
- Ninh Xuân (Hành cung Vũ Lâm – Paddy Fields or Ngô Đồng River (in Vietnamese))
- Hoa Lư (Tam Cốc Wharf)
- Hoa Lư (Lãng Khanh Hostel & Restaurant)
- Hoa Lư (Hang Múa)

Episode summary

- At the start of this leg, teams were instructed to fly to Hanoi, Vietnam. Once there, teams had to travel to the Thang Long Water Puppet Theatre and sign up for one of three water puppet shows, which could accommodate three teams each and took place ten minutes apart. Once inside, teams found a clue instructing them to watch the show to determine the location of their next clue. Teams had to figure out that the dragon puppets in the show had words on their necks – Ben Xe Giap Bat (Giáp Bát bus station) – where teams found their next clue, which instructed them to travel by bus to Ninh Bình.
- This leg's Detour was a choice between Escargot or Make Boat Go. In Escargot, teams had to harvest 100 snails from a paddy field in order to receive their next clue. In Make Boat Go, teams had to row a Vietnamese-style boat using the soles of their feet to a giant rock, where they found their next clue.
- After the Detour, teams had to travel to the Tam Cốc wharf in Hoa Lư, where they found their next clue.
- In this leg's Roadblock, teams had to travel to Lãng Khanh Hostel & Restaurant, where they found 300 banana leaf-wrapped young green rice parcels, nine of which contained a golden coin. One team member had to find a parcel with a coin in order to receive their next clue. If a parcel didn't have a coin in it, they had to consume the contents before unwrapping another.
- After the Roadblock, teams had to check in at the Pit Stop: Hang Múa in Hoa Lư.

Additional notes

- Jasmin & Jerome chose to use the U-Turn on Sid & Ash.
- This was a non-elimination leg.

=== Leg 4 (Vietnam) ===
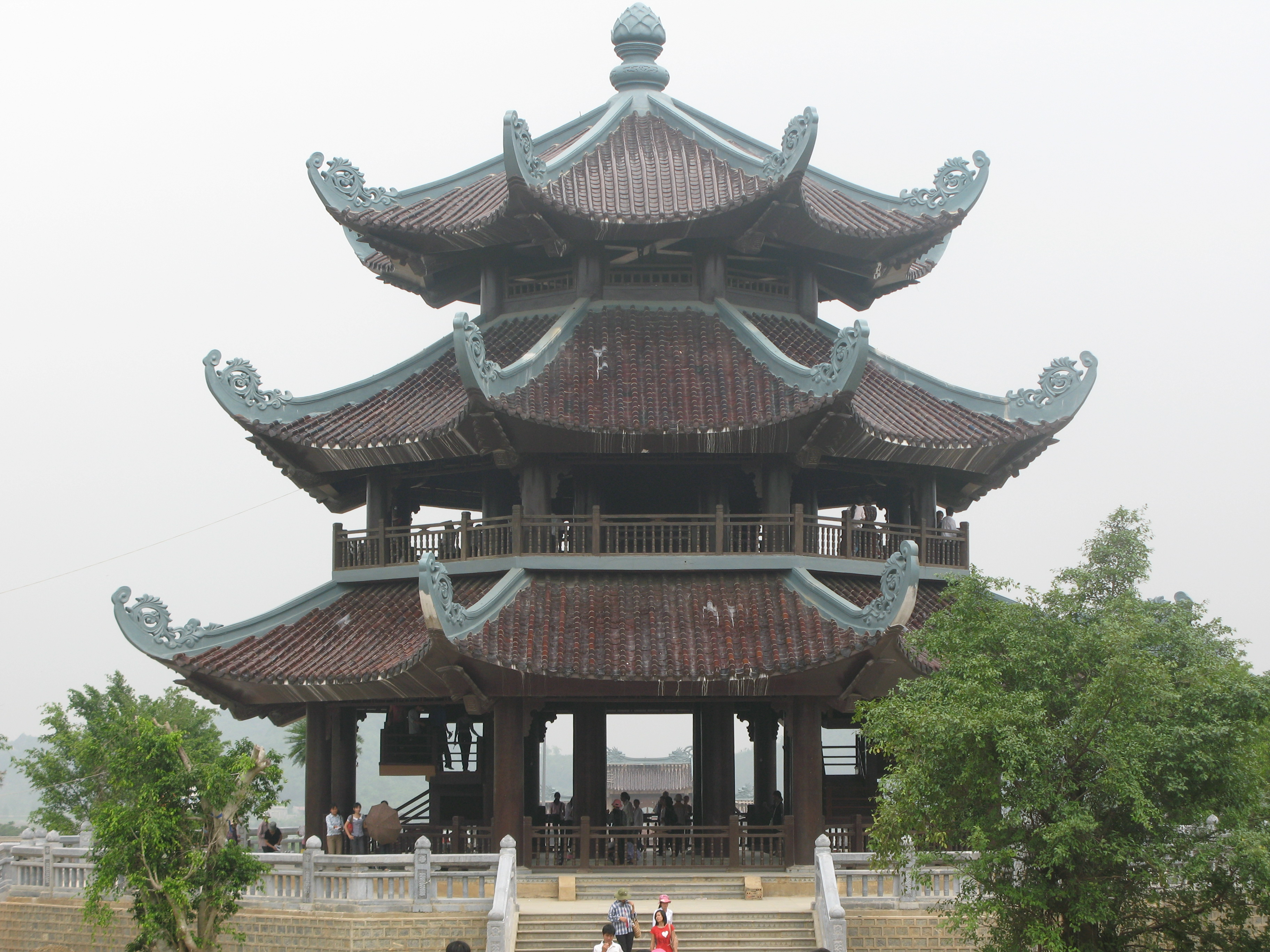
Teams were required to climb the bell tower at Bái Đính Temple in order to complete the leg's final task.

- Episode 4 (5 November 2019)
- Eliminated: Rowah & Amani

Locations

- Ninh Bình (The Reed Hotel)
- Hoa Lư (Hoa Lư Ancient Citadel & Chùa Nhất Trụ (in Vietnamese))
- Ninh Bình (Chùa Vàng Ninh Nhất (in Vietnamese))
- Gia Viễn (Bái Đính Temple – Bell Tower)
- Gia Viễn (Bái Đính Temple – Hồ Tiên)

Episode summary

- At the start of this leg, teams had to travel to the Hoa Lư Ancient Citadel, where they had to find a massive pile of incense sticks, make four two-kilogram (4.4 lb) bundles of sticks within 100 grams (3.5 oz) and then deliver them to Chùa Nhất Trụ in order to receive their next clue.
- For their Speed Bump, Rowah & Amani had to prepare five two-kilogram (4.4 lb) bundles of incense sticks instead of just four.
- This leg's Detour was a choice between Short Strokes or Long Strides. In Short Strokes, both team members had to wear a Full Moon Festival mask and paint a blank mask so as to replicate the mask worn by their partner to order to receive their next clue. In Long Strides, one team member at a time had to walk a circuit on the temple grounds on stilts without falling in order to receive their next clue.
- In this season's first Fast Forward, teams had to load a bicycle with 320 shrimp baskets and deliver them to a fisherman. Jasmin & Jerome won the Fast Forward.
- After the Detour, teams had to travel to the Bái Đính Temple in Gia Viễn, where they had to search among 500 Buddha statues to find the one with both feet on an animal: Pháp Luận Sơn. Teams then had to climb up the temple's bell tower to make their guess, and if they were correct, they could ring the bell and receive their next clue, which directed them to the nearby Pit Stop.

=== Leg 5 (Vietnam → Mongolia) ===
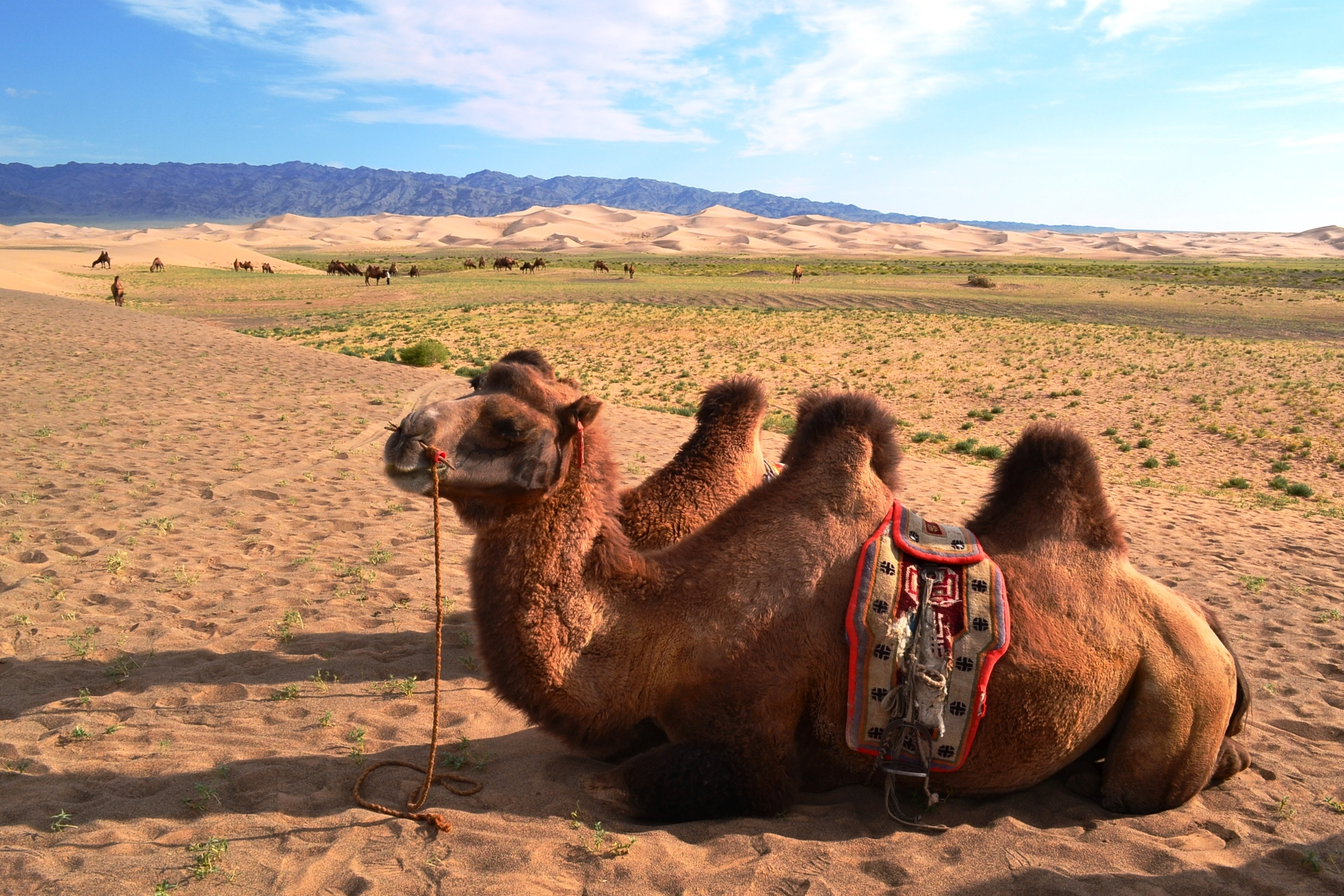
After the Detour in Mongolia, one team member had to ride a camel into the sand dunes of Mongol Els to find the Pit Stop.

- Episode 5 (11 November 2019)
- Medically Removed: Chris & Adrienne

Locations

- Ninh Bình (The Vissai Hotel)
- Hanoi → Ulaanbaatar, Mongolia
- Ulaanbaatar (Zaisan Memorial)
- Ulaanbaatar (Gandan Monastery – Janraisig Temple)
- Ulaanbaatar (Dragon Bus Terminal) → Govi-Altai (Mongol Els (in Mongolian) – Gers)
- Govi-Altai (Mongol Els Sand Dunes)

Episode summary

- At the start of this leg, teams were instructed to fly to Ulaanbaatar, Mongolia. Once there, teams had to travel to the Zaisan Memorial, where they had to climb its 300 steps to reach their next clue. Teams were directed to the Gandan Monastery, where they had to count the prayer wheels in the temple and give the correct answer to the monk in order to receive their next clue. Teams then had to travel to the Dragon Bus Terminal and board one of three charter buses to Mongol Els, the first and third of which carried three teams, while the second carried two teams. Once there, team members had to complete a welcome ceremony by each drinking a bowl of fermented horse milk before receiving their next clue.
- This leg's Detour was a choice between Milk the Best or Herd the Rest. In Milk the Best, teams had to milk a goat until they reached the marked line on the cup in order to receive their next clue. In Herd the Rest, teams had to use traditional Mongolian tools to capture and mark four goats with paint in order to receive their next clue.
- After the Detour, one team member had to lead a camel, with their partner riding atop, approximately one kilometre (0.62 mi) across the desert until they found the Pit Stop.

Additional note

- During this leg, Chris fell off his camel and broke several ribs. Long after all of the other teams had already checked in at the Pit Stop, Beau came out to the ger to inform Chris & Adrienne of their elimination.

=== Leg 6 (Mongolia) ===
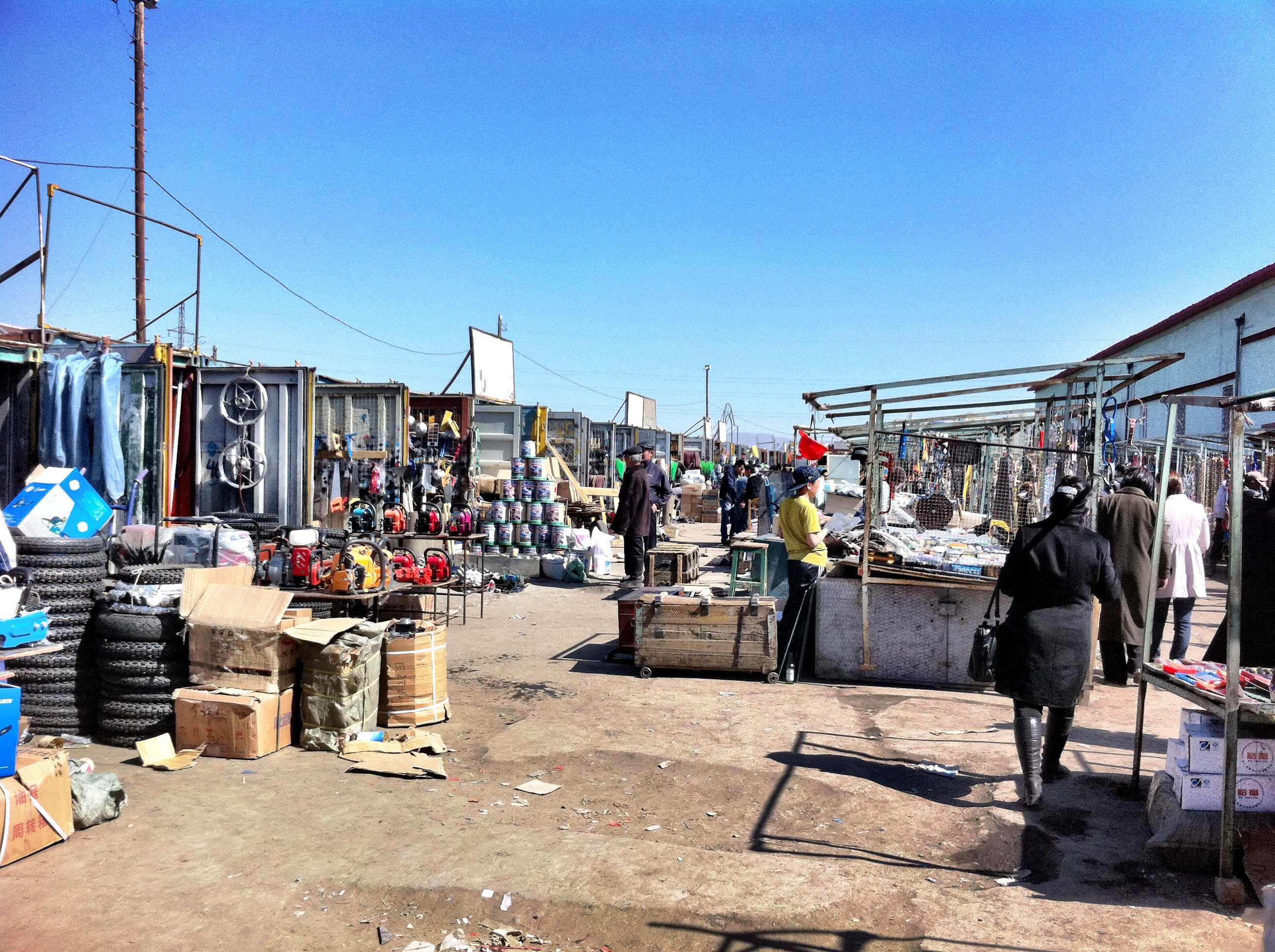
One Detour option in Ulaanbaatar required teams to deliver various items to stalls in the Narantuul Market.

- Episode 6 (12 November 2019)
- Prize: A$1,000 for each contestant, loaded on two Bankwest Halo rings (awarded to Sid & Ash)
- Eliminated: Hayley & Mikayla

Locations

- Gobi Gurvansaikhan National Park (Khongoryn Els Sand Dunes)
- Gobi Gurvansaikhan National Park (Khongoryn Gol Pasture)
- Ulaanbaatar (Ulaanbaatar Ensemble Theatre or Narantuul Market)
- Ulaanbaatar (Chingisiin Khuree Camp)

Episode summary

- At the start of this leg, teams had to dig within a marked area of the Khongoryn Els sand dunes and find a box, which contained their next clue.
- In this leg's Roadblock, one team member had to learn a traditional Mongolian chant, used to introduce a Mongolian wrestling match, and successfully perform it in order to receive their next clue.
- This leg's Detour was a choice between Dance or Deliver. In Dance, teams had to correctly perform the Durvun Oird, a traditional folk dance, with a dance troupe in front of an audience at the Ulaanbaatar Ensemble Theatre in order to receive their next clue. In Deliver, teams had to deliver boots, furniture and an oven, which teams had to assemble after delivery, consecutively to specific stalls, while navigating through thousands of stalls within the Narantuul Market in order to receive their next clue.
- After the Detour, teams had to check in at the Pit Stop: Chingisiin Khuree Camp in Ulaanbaatar.

Additional note

- Due to hot temperatures, there was a four-hour time limit for teams to complete their task at the Khongoryn Els sand dunes. Femi & Nick and Hayley & Mikayla were unable to complete the task within the allotted time and incurred a two-hour penalty at the Pit Stop.

=== Leg 7 (Mongolia → Zimbabwe → Zambia) ===
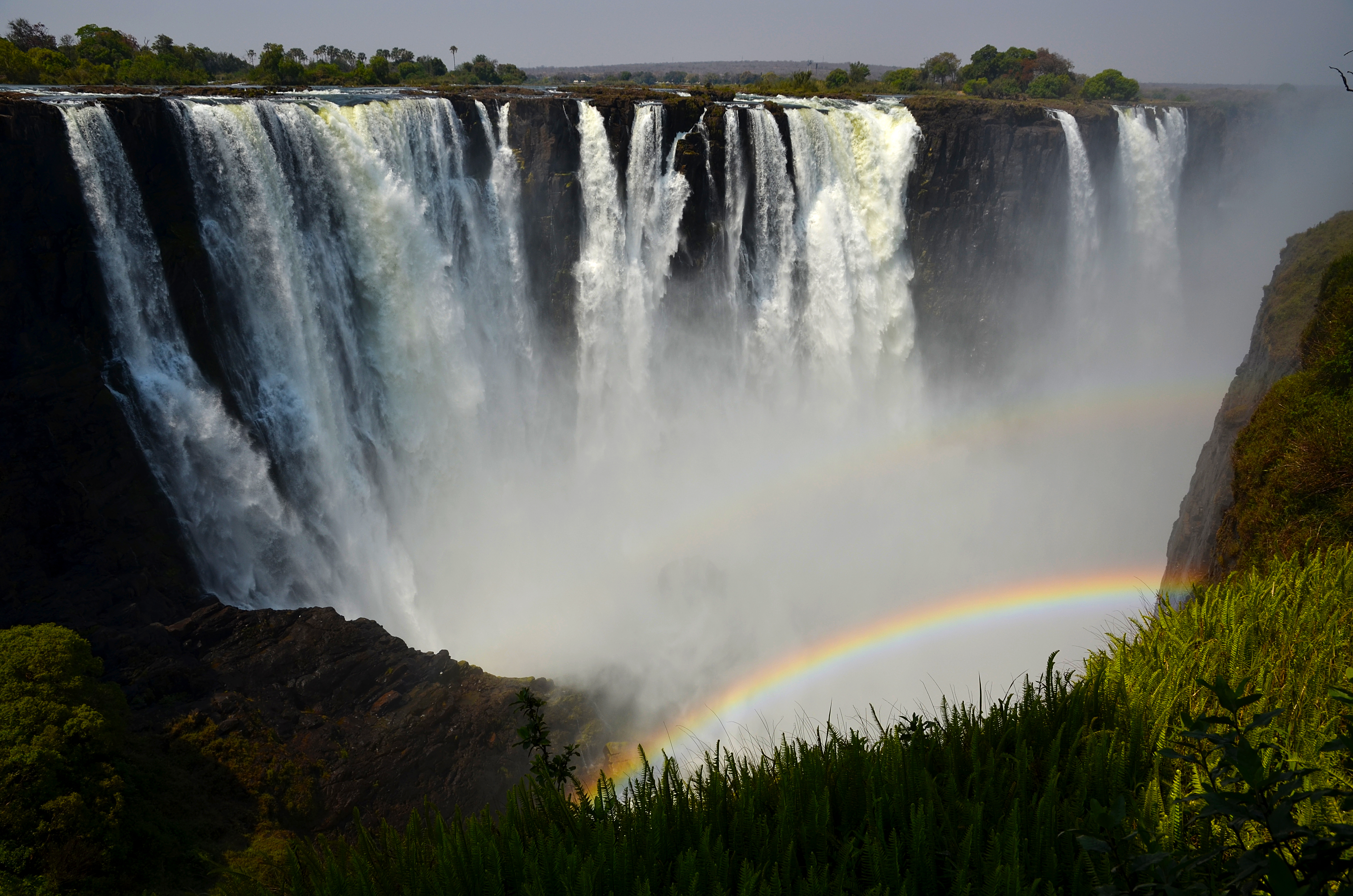
While in Zambia, teams travelled to Livingstone Island, where David Livingstone first viewed Victoria Falls.

- Episode 7 (18 November 2019)

Locations

- Ulaanbaatar (Choijin Lama Temple)
- Ulaanbaatar → Victoria Falls, Zimbabwe (Victoria Falls Airport)
- Victoria Falls National Park (Victoria Falls Bridge)
- Livingstone, Zambia (Batoka Sky Aerodrome)
- Kazungula District (Mukuni Village)
- Mosi-oa-Tunya National Park (Livingstone Island Launch Site → Livingstone Island)
- Mosi-oa-Tunya National Park (The Elephant Café)

Episode summary

- At the start of this leg, teams were instructed to fly to Victoria Falls, Zimbabwe. Outside the Victoria Falls Airport, teams took part in a traditional welcome ceremony for honored guests. Teams then received their next clue, instructing them to travel by taxi to the Victoria Falls Bridge, cross the bridge by foot over the Zambezi River into Zambia and then take another taxi to the Batoka Sky Aerodrome, where they found their next clue.
- In this leg's Roadblock, one team member had to fly in a microlight above Victoria Falls and spot six letters on the ground that they had to unscramble to identify the location of their next clue: Mukuni (Mukuni Village).
- At Mukuni Village, teams encountered an Intersection, which required two teams to mutually join together to complete the following task. The teams were paired up thusly: Tom & Tyler and Jasmin & Jerome, Tim & Rod and Sid & Ash, and Viv & Joey and Femi & Nick. The joined teams had to play a melody in sync on the marimba. Once they played the melody correctly, teams received their next clue. After this task, teams were no longer joined.
- This leg's Detour was a choice between Cultivate or Separate. In Cultivate, teams had to attach a plow to two oxen and then lead them to cultivate a field by creating eight straight furrows in order to receive their next clue. In Separate, teams had to assemble a dividing thatch fence along the house of a newlywed couple in order to receive their next clue.
- After the Detour, teams received a tablet with a video message from their loved ones, who informed them that their next clue was on Livingstone Island in Mosi-oa-Tunya National Park. Teams had to drive themselves to the Livingstone Island launch site and board one of two tourist boats to the island, with wait times between boats lasting up to 45 minutes. Teams then had to check in at the Pit Stop at The Elephant Café. For their safety and to avoid scaring the elephants, teams were required to walk along a marked path to the Pit Stop and could not run or deviate from the path.

Additional note

- This was a non-elimination leg.

=== Leg 8 (Zimbabwe) ===
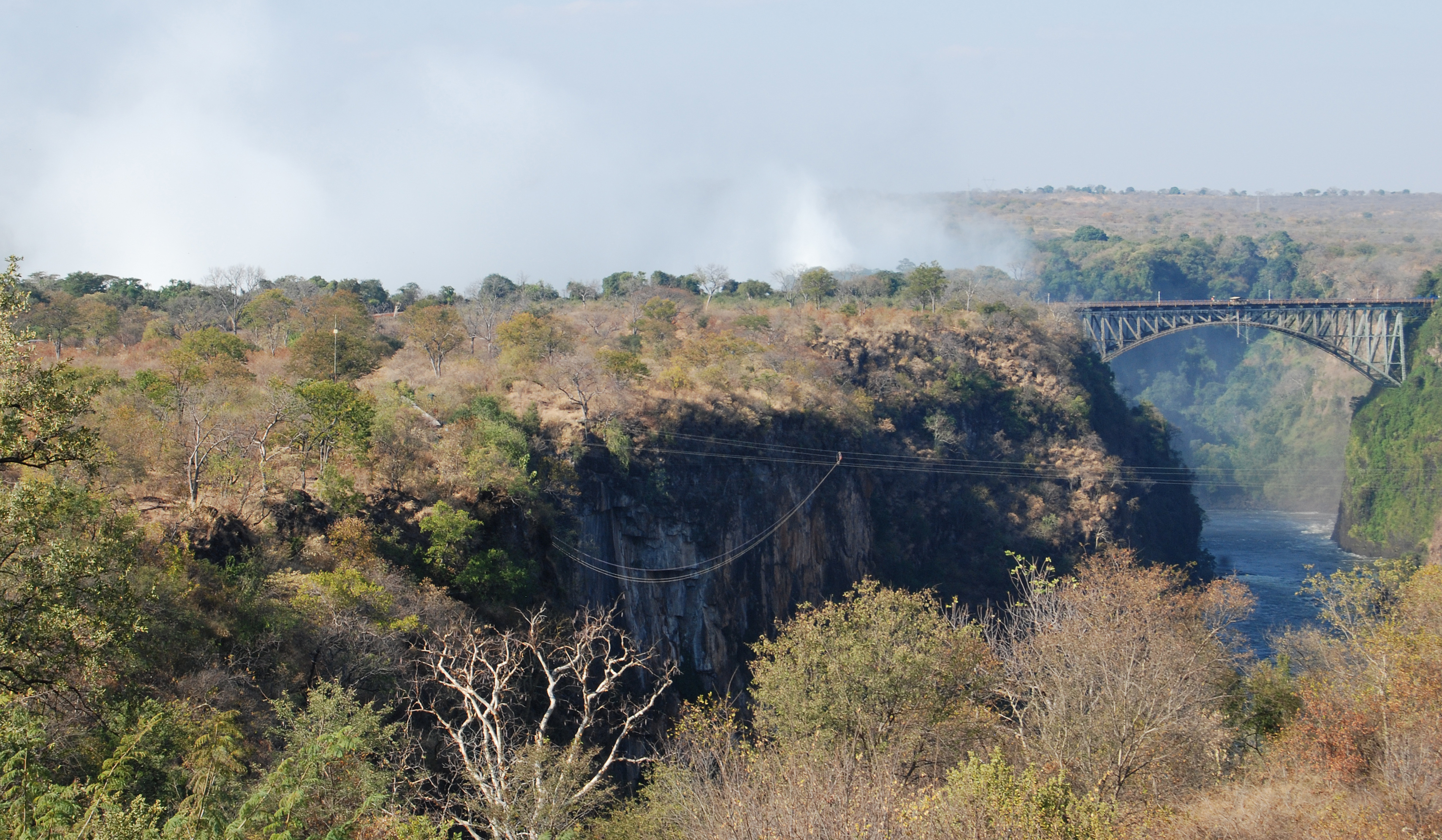
For the Roadblock in Zimbabwe, one team member had to swing headfirst into the Batoka Gorge.

- Episode 8 (19 November 2019)
- Eliminated: Sid & Ash

Locations

- Zambezi National Park, Zimbabwe (Border Kiosk)
- Victoria Falls National Park (Batoka Gorge)
- Victoria Falls (Victoria Falls Private Game Reserve)
- Chisuma Village (Chisuma Primary School)
- Victoria Falls (Mpala Village)

Episode summary

- In this leg's Roadblock, one team member had to perform a headfirst free-fall 70 metres (230 ft) into the Batoka Gorge and then swing across the Zambezi River. After returning to the top of the ledge, teams received their next clue.
- For their Speed Bump, both Sid & Ash had to perform the gorge swing into the Batoka Gorge, one after the other.
- In this season's second Fast Forward, one team had to correctly identify ten sets of animal droppings using a list with brief descriptions and place them in front of the corresponding animal carvings. Tom & Tyler won the Fast Forward.
- Teams who did not pursue the Fast Forward had to identify five signs of illegal poaching (an axe, bullets, a fire pit, cigarettes and a matchbox) and relay them to the gamekeeper in order to receive their next clue. Teams were then directed to the Chisuma Primary School in Chisuma Village, where they found their next clue in the suggestions box.
- This leg's Detour was a choice between Build It or Serve It. In Build It, teams had to assemble two pieces of playground equipment (swings, a seesaw, or monkey bars) in order to receive their next clue. In Serve It, teams had to cook a traditional Zimbabwean meal, mielie meal porridge, for ten school children in order to receive their next clue.
- At Mpala Village, each team member had to carry a bucket of water on their head and walk to the Pit Stop, where they presented their buckets to a village elder.

=== Leg 9 (Zambia → Malawi) ===
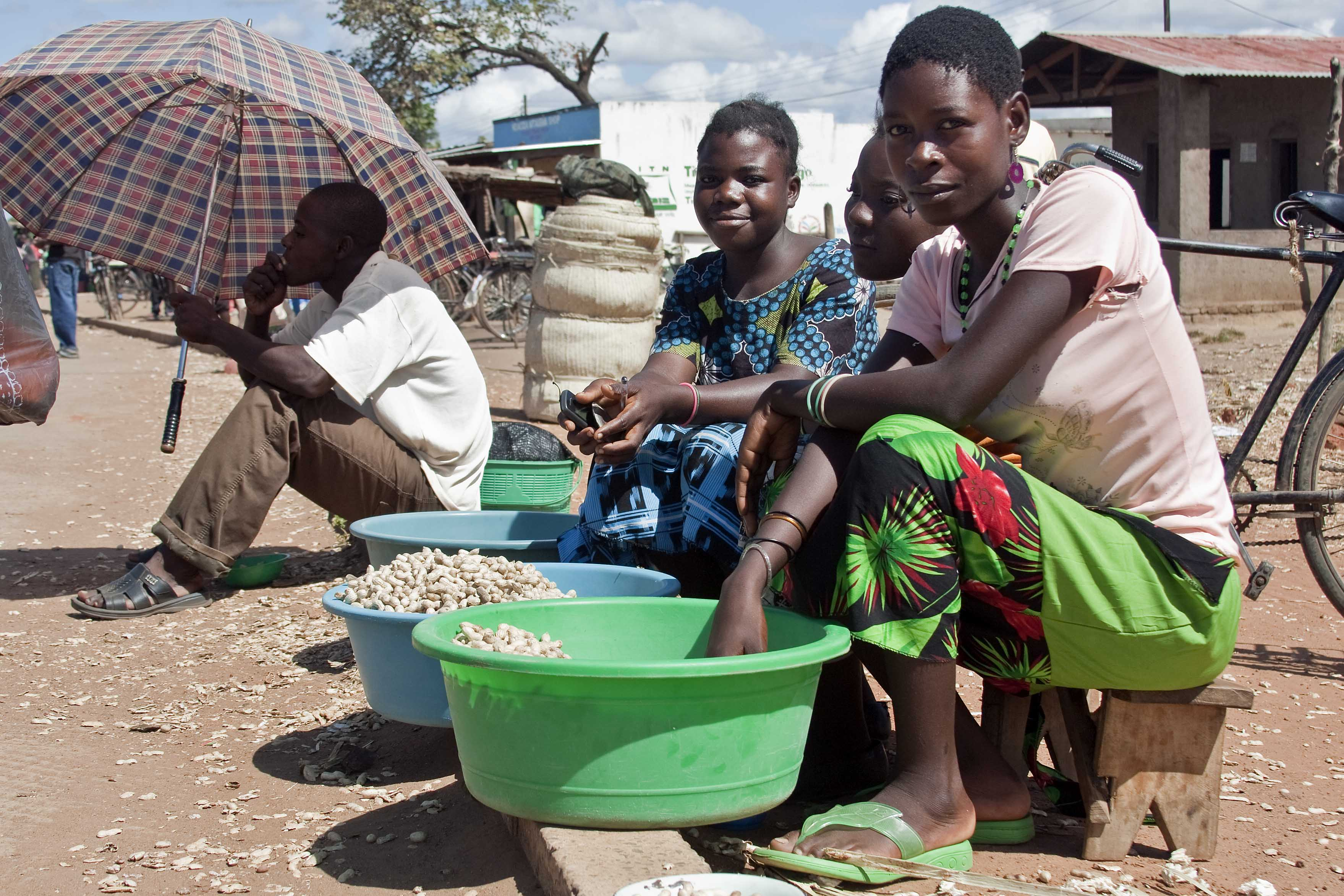
After arriving in Lilongwe, teams had to shell and winnow peanuts, one of the main agricultural products of Malawi.

- Episode 9 (25 November 2019)

Locations

- Mosi-oa-Tunya National Park, Zambia (Avani Victoria Falls Resort)
- Livingstone → Lilongwe, Malawi (Kamuzu International Airport)
- Lilongwe (Mgona Market)
- Chezi (Chezi Market)
- Salima District (Brickmaking Area)
- Mphere (Lake Malawi – Kumbali Lake Retreat)
- Mphere (Lifuwu Village)

Episode summary

- At the start of this leg, teams were instructed to fly to Lilongwe, Malawi. Once there, they had to travel to the Mgona Market, where they had to shell and winnow five kilograms (11 lb) of peanuts in order o receive their next clue.
- This leg's Detour was a choice between Stack or Stitch. In Stack, teams had to pack a bag with charcoal until it overflowed yet was held in place by sticks and strings. Once the stack was secure, teams had to deliver the bag to a vendor in order to receive their next clue. In Stitch, teams had to sew together two traditional shirts using a sewing machine powered by a treadle in order to receive their next clue.
- After the Detour, teams had to properly mix and mould 50 clay bricks in order to receive their next clue. Teams were then directed to the Kumbali Lake Retreat, where one team member had to run into Lake Malawi to retrieve a bag of puzzle pieces, but the directions to the bag were in Chichewa. The team member on shore had to guide their partner using a blackboard that listed Chichewa-to-English translations. Once they found the bag, teams had to assemble the pieces inside to form a statue in order to receive their next clue, which directed them to the Pit Stop at Lifuwu Village.

Additional notes

- After landing in Malawi, teams found Beau outside the airport and were informed that they had to vote to U-Turn a team before they could continue racing. The teams' votes, as well as the voting order, are as follows:

Team	Vote
Tim & Rod	Tom & Tyler
Jasmin & Jerome	Tim & Rod
Viv & Joey	Tim & Rod
Tom & Tyler	Tim & Rod
Femi & Nick	Tim & Rod

- This was a non-elimination leg.

=== Leg 10 (Malawi) ===
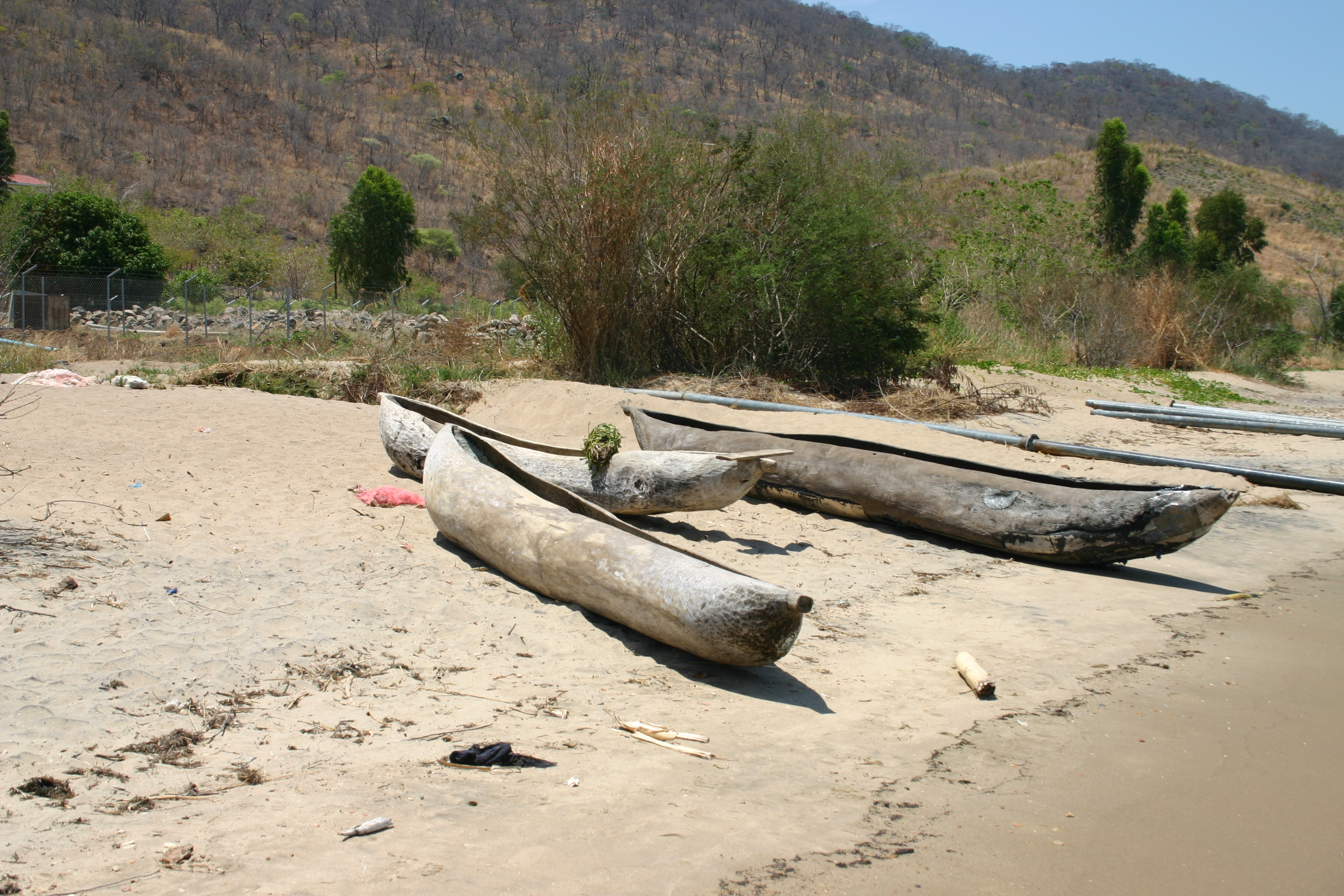
Teams began the tenth leg by paddling dugout canoes through the waters of Lake Malawi.

- Episode 10 (26 November 2019)
- Eliminated: Femi & Nick

Locations

- Mphere (Leopard Bay Beach)
- Mphere (Lifuwu Village)
- Lilongwe (Lizulu Market)
- Lilongwe (Lizulu Market – Nsapato Section)
- Lilongwe (Harry's Bar)
- Lilongwe (Kumbali Lodge)

Episode summary

- At the start of this leg, teams had to row a traditional dugout canoe one kilometre (0.62 mi) back to Lifuwu Village in order to find their next clue.
- For their Speed Bump, Viv & Joey had to empty their waterlogged canoe before they could begin rowing.
- This leg's Detour was a choice between Dirty or Smelly. In Dirty, teams had to wash 30 items of clothing at a washing station on the beach and lay them out to dry in order to receive their next clue. In Smelly, teams had to bring a bucket of fish to a drying table and sort the fish by species in order to receive their next clue.
- In this leg's Roadblock, one team member had to make two pairs of sandals from recycled items in order to receive their next clue.
- In the Nsapato Section of the Lizulu Market, teams had to listen for a megaphone, typically used to advertise stall goods, that broadcast their next clue, which directed teams to Harry's Bar. There, each team member had to take a two-minute quiz about events from previous legs in order to receive their next clue. Teams received a one-minute time penalty for each incorrect answer that would be applied at the Pit Stop. Following the quiz, teams had to learn a local Malawian song in the native Chichewa and then perform it on stage in order to receive their next clue, which directed teams to the Pit Stop: the Kumbali Lodge.

Questions	Answers
Who jumped the elevator queue in Namsan Tower?	Tom & Tyler
Which team attempted a Fast Forward, then gave up?	Tim & Rod
Who gave up the stilts for shrimp baskets in Vietnam?	Jasmin & Jerome
Which team was second to arrive to build play equipment in Zimbabwe?	Femi & Nick
Which team took two clues leaving a team with none?	Sid & Ash
Which team took four attempts to sing their Mongolian wrestling song?	Hayley & Mikayla
Which team spent the most time in a taxi in the first leg?	Alana & Niko
Who was overtaken in the last 30 seconds of the second leg?	Judy & Therese
Who successfully stacked cups and paddled with their feet?	Rowah & Amani
Who nailed flyboarding in under two minutes?	Chris & Adrienne

=== Leg 11 (Malawi → Thailand) ===
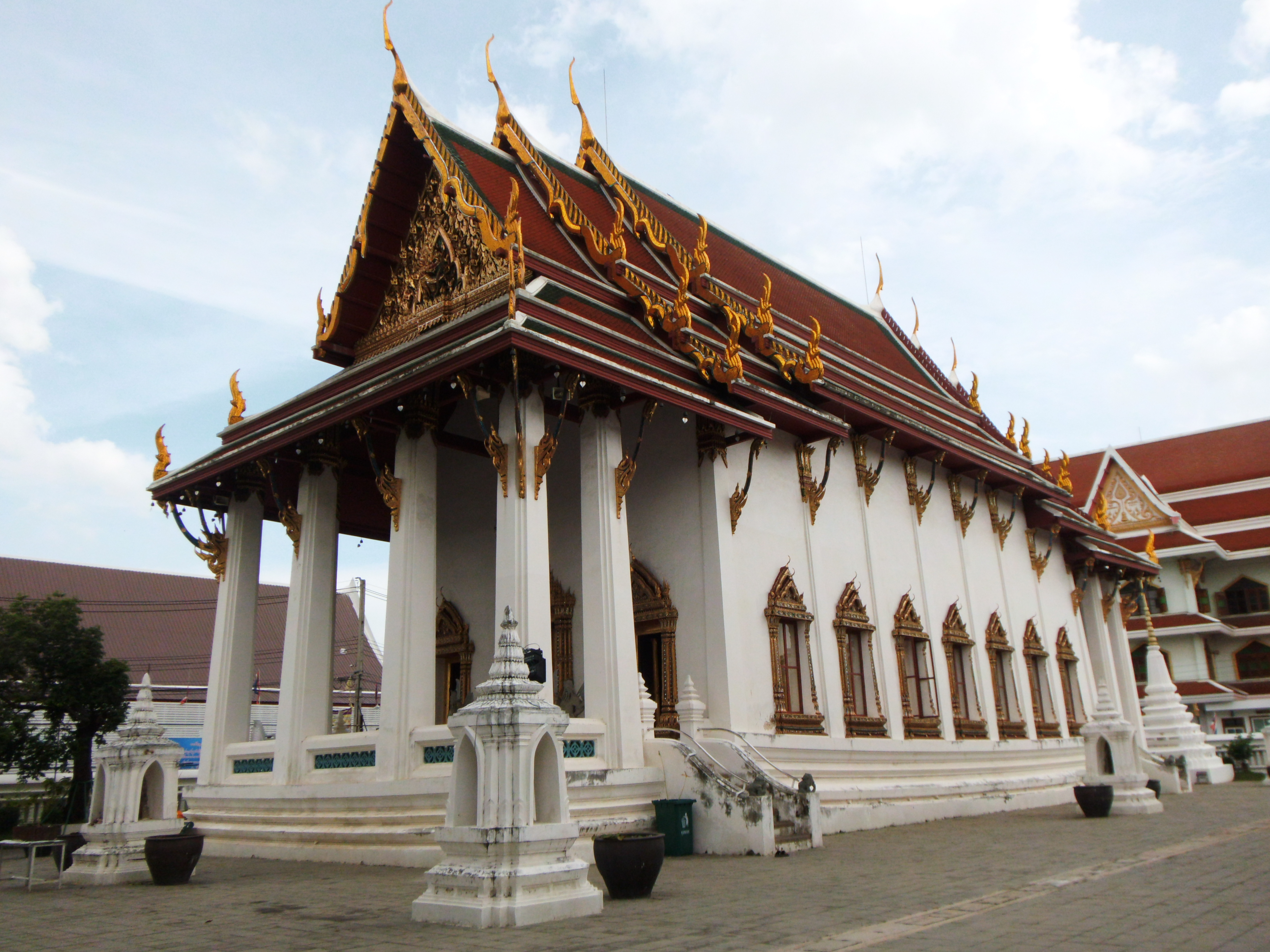
After gold leafing a statue of Ganesh, teams could check in at the Pit Stop at Wat Suwannaram in Bangkok.

- Episode 11 (2 December 2019)
- Prize: A holiday in the Northern Territory (awarded to Tim & Rod)
- Eliminated: Tom & Tyler

Locations

- Lilongwe (President Hotel, Umodzi Park Resort)
- Lilongwe → Bangkok, Thailand
- Bangkok (Khlong Toei Market)
- Bangkok (Chao Phraya River or Tuk-Tuk Garage)
- Bangkok (Sathorn Pier)
- Bangkok (Kudi Khao Community Center)
- Bangkok (Wat Suwannaram)

Episode summary

- At the start of this leg, teams were instructed to fly to Bangkok, Thailand. Once there, teams had to travel to the Khlong Toei Market, where each team member had to eat three century eggs in order to receive their next clue.
- This season's final Detour was a choice between Water or Wheels. In Water, teams had to ride a long-tail boat on the Chao Phraya River and memorise twelve riverside landmarks. Teams then had to place images of the landmarks in the correct spots on a map in order to receive their next clue. In Wheels, teams had to properly attach parts to a tuk-tuk and then decorate it in order to receive their next clue.
- In this leg's Roadblock, one team member had to fit three patients with a set of dentures in order to receive their next clue.
- After the Roadblock, teams had to travel to Wat Suwannaram. There, teams had to completely gold leaf a statue of Ganesh and then bring it to the nearby Pit Stop.

Additional note

- During the flight from Lilongwe to Bangkok, each team voted in secret for a team to U-Turn. Teams learned the U-Turn results at Sathorn Pier. The teams' votes, as well as the voting order, are as follows:

Team	Vote
Tim & Rod	Tom & Tyler
Jasmin & Jerome	Tom & Tyler
Viv & Joey	Tom & Tyler
Tom & Tyler	Tim & Rod

=== Leg 12 (Thailand → Australia) ===
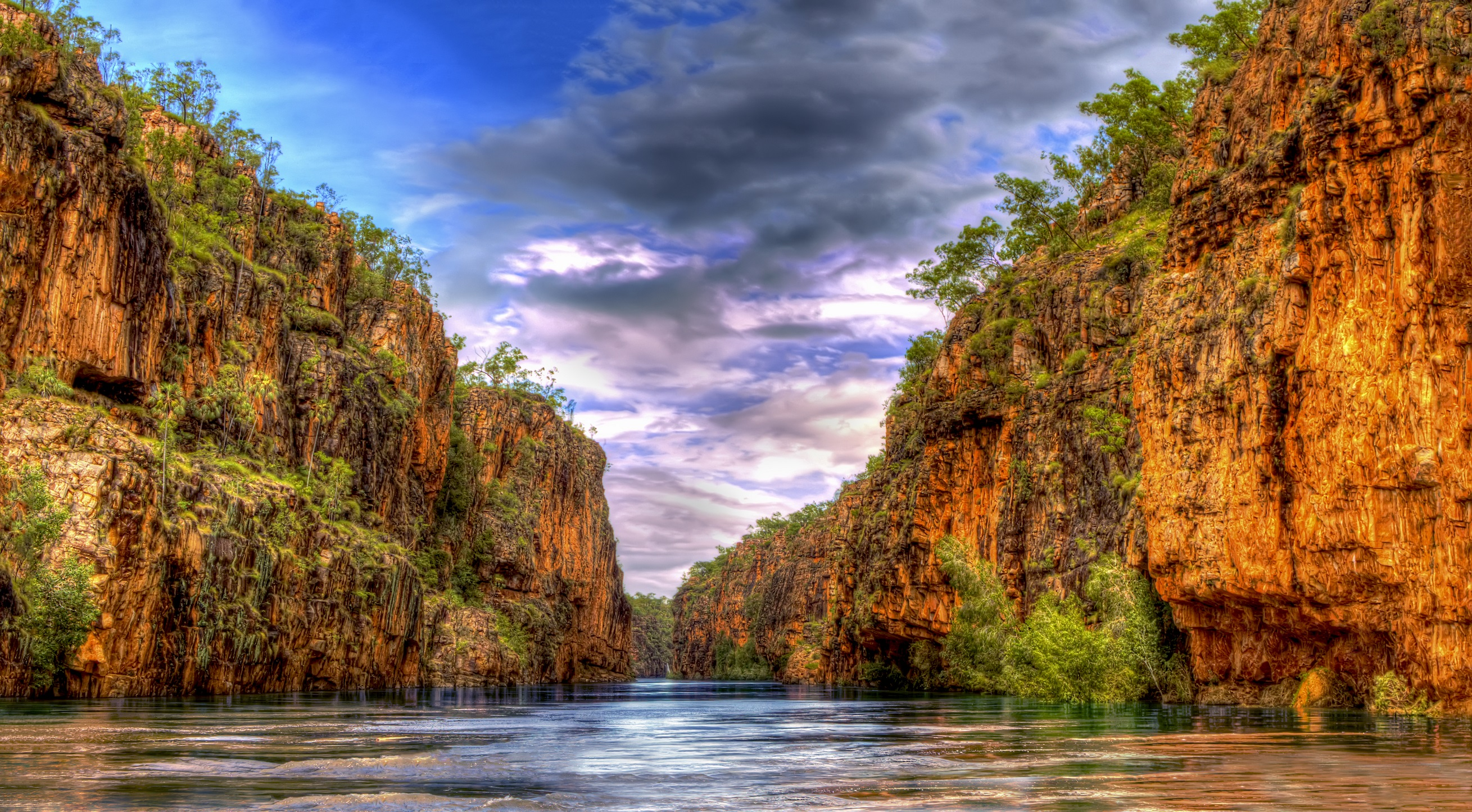
After racing over 45,000 kilometers, teams crossed the finish line at Nitmiluk Gorge in the Top End of the Northern Territory.

- Episode 12 (3 December 2019)
- Prize: A$250,000
- Winners: Tim & Rod
- Runners-up: Jasmin & Jerome
- Third place: Viv & Joey

Locations

- Bangkok → Darwin, Northern Territory (Darwin International Airport)
- Darwin (Darwin Waterfront Precinct & Big Buoy Water Park)
- Darwin → Katherine
- Katherine (Katherine Outback Experience)
- Nitmiluk National Park (Nitmiluk Gorge)

Episode summary

- At the start of this leg, teams were instructed to fly to Darwin, Northern Territory. Once there, teams had to search the airport for a Jetstar representative, who handed them their next clue.
- At the Darwin Waterfront Precinct, teams had to find stacks of Northern Territory News newspapers, one of which was on top of a Big Buoy Water Park inflatable, and then sort out the sensational headlines to find eight that were related to events which had happened on previous legs. Once found, teams had to present their headlines to the newspaper's editor, who gave them their next clue after verifying that they were all correct. The correct headlines were:

Headline	Reference
"A Couple of Basket Cases Jump the Queue"	Tom & Tyler and Viv & Joey skipping the queue at Namsan Tower
"Flying Firefighter Saves the Day"	Adrienne completing the Roadblock in leg 1
"Ungodly Dumpling Theft"	Sid & Ash's stealing a dumpling from Judy & Therese
"Slippery Suckers Cause Dunking"	Escargot Detour in leg 3
"Birthday Girl Vomits Golden Opportunity"	Mikayla vomiting during the Roadblock in leg 3
"Desert's Storm Forces Alien Alliances"	Desert digging task in leg 6
"Big Voice Serenades Tough Guys"	Mongolian chant Roadblock in leg 6
"Royal Watery Welcome"	Local greeting in Zimbabwe

- Teams then had to board a plane to Katherine and then had to land by performing a 10,000-foot (3,000 m) tandem skydive. After they completed the jump, teams were given their next clue.
- In this season's final Roadblock, one team member had to train a Cattle Dog to run through a figure-eight course and then tame a wild horse by touching it in order to receive their next clue.
- After the Roadblock, teams had to board a helicopter to Nitmiluk Gorge. After landing, teams had to kayak on the Katherine River to find seven puzzle pieces hidden throughout the gorge. After finding the missing pieces and returning to the landing site, teams had to sort the pieces from amongst several decoy pieces to find the ones that depicted national flags, locations, eliminated teams, currencies and challenges from previous legs. They then had to assemble the correct pieces into six cubes so that each cube represented one country. Teams then had to stack the cubes in order to receive their final clue directing them to the nearby finish line.

Leg	Nation	Flag	Currency	Challenge	Locations	Eliminated teams
1	South Korea	(South Korea)	Won	All Heart or All Thumbs	Namsangol Hanok Village	Alana & Niko
2	South Korea	(South Korea)	Won	All Heart or All Thumbs	Namsangol Hanok Village	Judy & Therese
3	Vietnam	(Vietnam)	Đồng	Short Strokes or Long Strides	Bái Đính Temple	Rowah & Amani
4	Vietnam	(Vietnam)	Đồng	Short Strokes or Long Strides	Bái Đính Temple	Rowah & Amani
5	Mongolia	(Mongolia)	Tugrik	Durvun Oird or Narantuul	Janraisig Temple	Chris & Adrienne
6	Mongolia	(Mongolia)	Tugrik	Durvun Oird or Narantuul	Janraisig Temple	Hayley & Mikayla
7	Zambia	(Zambia)	—N/a	Build Up or Serve Up	The Elephant Café	Sid & Ash
8	Zimbabwe	(Zimbabwe)	—N/a	Build Up or Serve Up	Chisuma	Sid & Ash
9	Malawi	(Malawi)	Kwacha	Stack or Stich	Mgona Market	Femi & Nick
10	Malawi	(Malawi)	Kwacha	Stack or Stich	Lizulu Market	Femi & Nick
11	Thailand	(Thailand)	Baht	Wheels or Water	Khlong Toei Market	Tom & Tyler

Additional note

- Due to unfavourable wind conditions, Viv & Joey were unable to complete the skydive and had to land at the nearby Katherine Airport instead. Viv & Joey were immediately given their next clue without being issued a time penalty.

== Reception ==
=== Ratings ===
Ratings data is from OzTAM and represents the viewership from the 5 largest Australian metropolitan centres (Sydney, Melbourne, Brisbane, Perth and Adelaide).

Week	Episode	Air date	Timeslot	Overnight ratings		Consolidated ratings		Total ratings		Source
Week	Episode	Air date	Timeslot	Viewers	Rank	Viewers	Rank	Viewers	Rank	Source
1	1	28 October 2019	Monday 7:30 pm	635,000	8	82,000	2	716,000	8	
1	2	29 October 2019	Tuesday 7:30 pm	522,000	10	77,000	2	599,000	8	
2	3	4 November 2019	Monday 7:30 pm	532,000	15	140,000	1	671,000	8	
2	4	5 November 2019	Tuesday 7:30 pm	511,000	12	83,000	2	594,000	11	
3	5	11 November 2019	Monday 7:30 pm	651,000	8	94,000	3	745,000	6	
3	6	12 November 2019	Tuesday 7:30 pm	608,000	8	99,000	2	707,000	7	
4	7	18 November 2019	Monday 7:30 pm	616,000	9	69,000	4	695,000	7	
4	8	19 November 2019	Tuesday 7:30 pm	553,000	9	62,000	2	615,000	7	
5	9	25 November 2019	Monday 7:30 pm	609,000	11	87,000	4	697,000	7	
5	10	26 November 2019	Tuesday 7:30 pm	546,000	8	73,000	2	619,000	8	
6	11	2 December 2019	Monday 7:30 pm	611,000	7	63,000	1	675,000	6	
6	12 (Note: The final episode was coded into two programs - "Grand Finale" and "The Finish Line". Because of this, two separate sets of ratings were produced.)	3 December 2019	Tuesday 7:30 pm	620,000	8	50,000	4	670,000	7	
6	12	3 December 2019	Tuesday 7:30 pm	739,000	4	66,000	2	805,000	3	
