= Ken Barker =

Australian Roman Catholic priest

Reverend Ken Barker MGL
- Founder of the Missionaries of God's Love
- Other post: Moderator of the Missionaries of God's Love (1986-2022)

Orders
- Ordination: 30 August 1974

Personal details
- Born: Kenneth Robert Barker Murrumburrah, New South Wales, Australia
- Denomination: Catholic
- Occupation: Catholic Priest
- Education: B.Sc., Ph.D
- Alma mater: St Patrick’s College, Goulburn; Sydney University; St Columba's College, Springwood; St Patrick's College, Manly; Catholic University of America, Washington D.C.

Ken Barker is an Australian Roman Catholic priest. He is the moderator of the Missionaries of God's Love religious congregation and founder of the Young Men of God Movement.

He received his training to become a priest from St Columba's College, Springwood, NSW and St Patrick's College, Manly. He finished a degree in theology, graduating with honours. He then returned to the University of Sydney and finished his science degree.

The Missionaries of God's Love (MGL) came into being in 1986 with a base in a suburban house in Canberra. 20 years later, the MGL has more than 40 members, 13 ordained priests, two deacons, 16 at its seminary in Melbourne which is overseen by Fr Chris Ryan. In addition to Canberra and Melbourne, in 2019 the Missionaries of God's Love have missions in Darwin, Sydney, the Philippines and Indonesia.

He is the author of 5 books His Name is Mercy, Becoming Fire, Radical Way of Love, Amazing Love, and the best-selling Young Men Rise Up. His sixth book is called Go Set the World on Fire.

In 2018, after being re-elected as head of the order he told members of his congregation that this would be his last term.
