= Missionaries of God's Love =

Australian Catholic religious congregation

- Abbreviation: MGL
- Formation: 1986; 40 years ago
- Founder: Fr Ken Barker MGL
- Type: Religious Institute of Diocesan Rite
- Headquarters: 6 Boake Place, Garran, Australian Capital Territory
- Members: 40 (priests & fully professed brothers) as of May 2025
- Moderator: Fr. Stephen Fletcher, MGL
- Ministry: Evangelisation, with a special focus on young people, the poor, and the marginalised
- Parent organization: Catholic Church
- Website: mglpriestsandbrothers.org

The Missionaries of God's Love (MGL) is a Roman Catholic religious congregation that came into being in Canberra, Australia in 1986. It is partnered with a lay organisation which is now called The Disciples of Jesus Covenant Community.

It was founded by Fr Ken Barker who is the moderator of the congregation and is also the founder of the Young Men of God Movement.

31 years later, the MGL has more than 70 members including 30 ordained priests. Today in addition to missions in Canberra, Sydney and Melbourne, the MGL operates missions in Darwin where chaplaincies minister to the Aboriginal community, and in Manila where the brothers live amongst the poor in the squatter settlements of North Quezon City.

Inspired by St Francis of Assisi during a visit to Umbria, Italy in 2000, Fr Ken founded the Young Men of God Movement (YMGM) to reach out and empower young men with the love of God and to encourage them to become leaders within their own communities, maximise the talents God has given them, and realise their full potential.

The following are some facets of the MGL's ministry:

- managing parishes at Narrabundah (Canberra), East Burwood (Melbourne), Peakhurst and Penshurst (Sydney), Casuarina (Northern Territory) and St. Benedict in Commonwealth, Quezon City Manila, Philippines which are developing as centres of renewal and evangelisation, and drawing the young back into the life of the Church
- involvement in evangelising young people through Summer Schools of Evangelisation in four locations
- partners in the Asia-Pacific School of Evangelisation which trains young people as evangelists and sends them on cross-cultural missions in the Asia-Pacific region
- a key role in the biennial Light to the Nations pilgrimage held at the Chevalier College, Bowral
- active in preparations for World Youth Day in Sydney in July 2008.
- actively promoting the new evangelisation through work with Catholic groups and communities. They have their own Website and In 2013 the MGL priests and brothers launched a new online media site to make resources of talks, music and video freely available for these groups.

The MGL is becoming a multicultural brotherhood, drawing vocations not only from Australia and New Zealand, but also from Indonesia, Philippines, Sri Lanka, East Timor, India and Nigeria. This cultural mix is symbolic of the Church in Australia today and the challenges facing our society.

The congregation is an Australian foundation with an international membership. Its first mission is to the Church in Australia which the congregation believes is suffering from the emptiness of secularism and relativism with a particular concern to reach the young and the alienated who do not yet know the love of God.

There are also 19 Sisters living in Canberra, Sydney and Melbourne involved with the young people in evangelisation and mission work in many of the same areas as the Priests and Brothers. Sr Patti Jo Crockett MGL is one of the co-founders of the missionary of God's Love sisters.

In 2019, two sisters of the order (Judy & Therese) competed on The Amazing Race Australia 4.

== Recognition ==
In 2014 the order of Priests and Brothers was formally recognised by the Vatican as a religious institute of diocesan rite.
