= Seoullo 7017 =

Elevated park in Seoul, South Korea

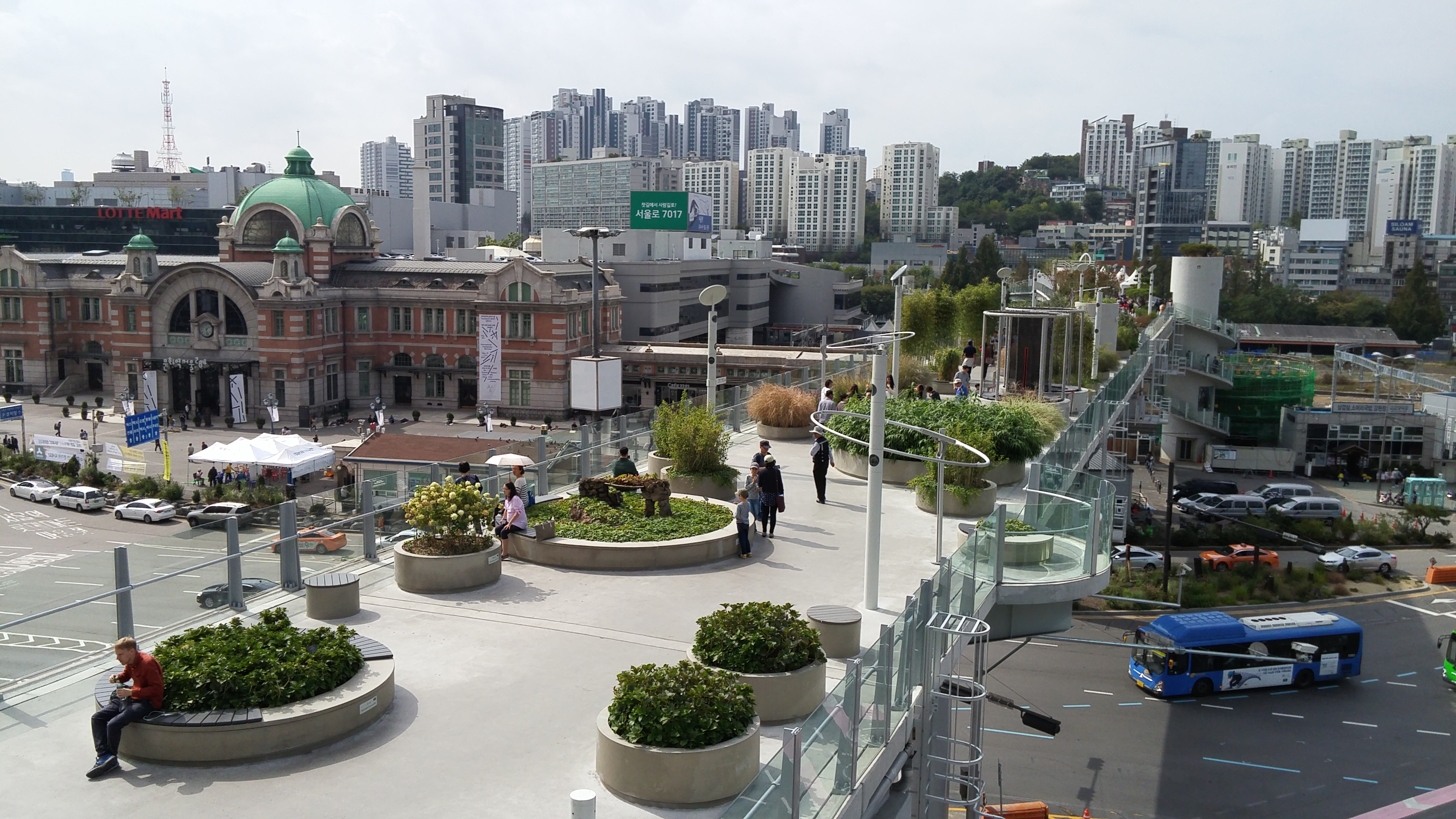
- The park, on top of the bridge structure (2017)
- Interactive map of Seoullo 7017
- Location: Seoul, South Korea
- Coordinates: 37.556978°N 126.974766°E
- Public transit: Subway Line 1/4/Gyeongui-Jungang Line/AREX, Seoul Station, Exits Exit 7

Seoullo 7017 (Korean: 서울로 7017), also known as the Seoul Skygarden or Skypark, is an elevated linear park in Seoul, built atop a former highway overpass (Seoul Station Overpass, Korean: 서울역고가도로). The path, which is about 1 kilometre (0.62 mi) in length and lined with 24,000 plants, is similar to New York City's High Line. Skygarden was designed by MVRDV, a Dutch firm, and opened in May 2017. The path also improves walking times around Seoul Station.

The disused overpass closed in 2015 and cuts diagonally across Seoul Station at 17 metres (56 ft) above street level. The "70" in the name comes from 1970, the year the flyover was dedicated, while the "17" is a reference to both the number of walkways connected to it and its opening in 2017. The park includes gardens, terraces, and exhibitions, and was promised to "feature over 24,085 plants representing 228 species of trees, shrubs and flowers found in and outside Korea."

== History ==
In the 1960s, a decade after the Korean War, Seoul constructed dozens of elevated highways to keep traffic flowing through the capital. Over time, the overpasses came to be seen as a blight on the landscape, and their “deteriorating condition posed a safety risk." As they were gradually removed, city planners began to repurpose some as pedestrian green spaces. Seoul mayor Park Won-soon pushed for the US$52 million skypark to be completed as a complement to Seoul's Cheonggyecheon Stream restoration project, organized under previous mayor Lee Myung-bak.

The park's plans faced early controversy over fears of traffic congestion and concerns from market owners in nearby Namdaemun.

== Location ==
The Skypark begins at Malli-dong and continues northeast past Seoul Station, ending 1,024 meters later near Namdemun at Hoehyeon Station. The park is visible from Seoul Station but the nearest stairway is across the street from the front of the station, or subway exit 1 of the Seoul Metro.

== Gallery ==
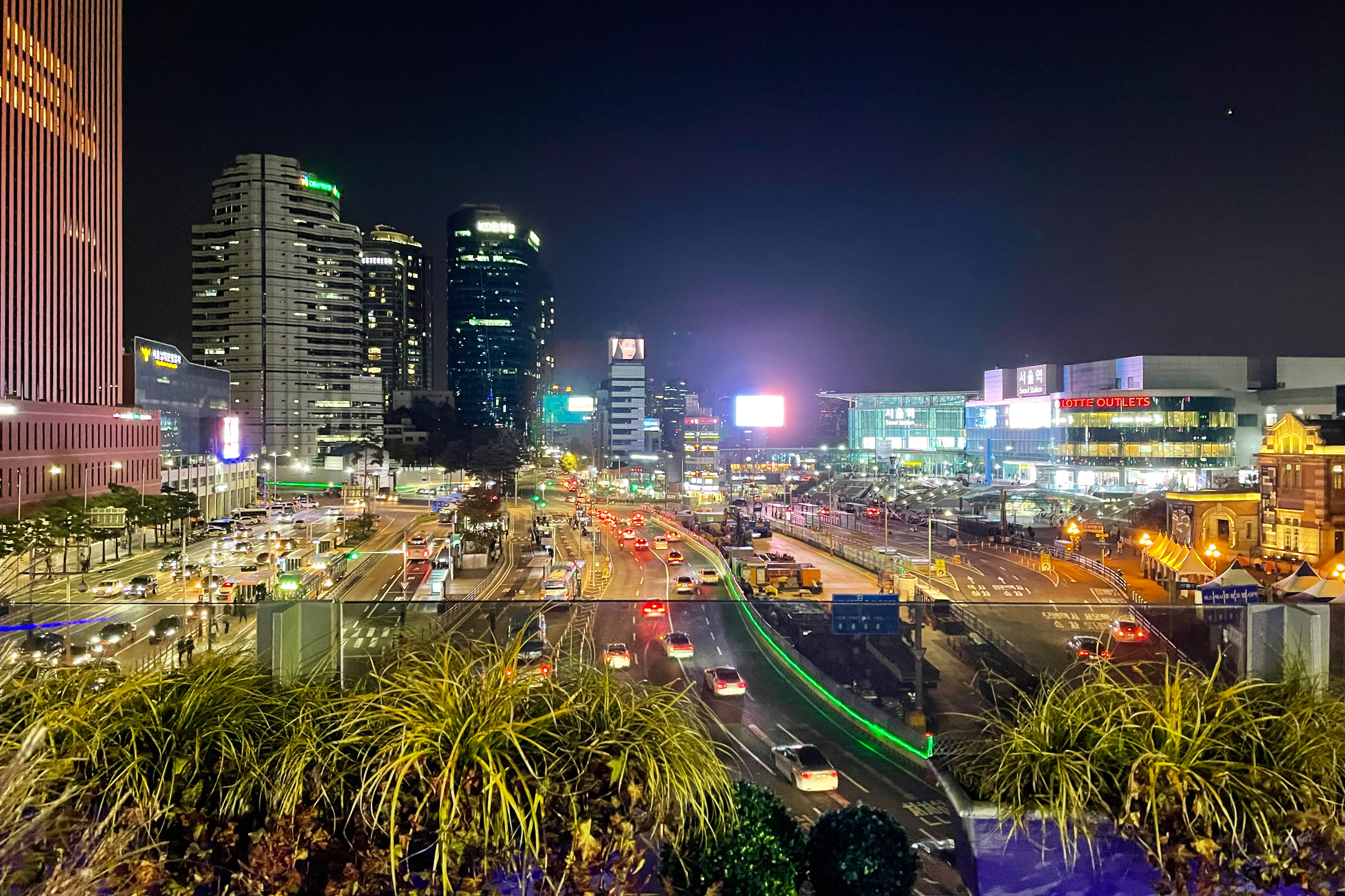

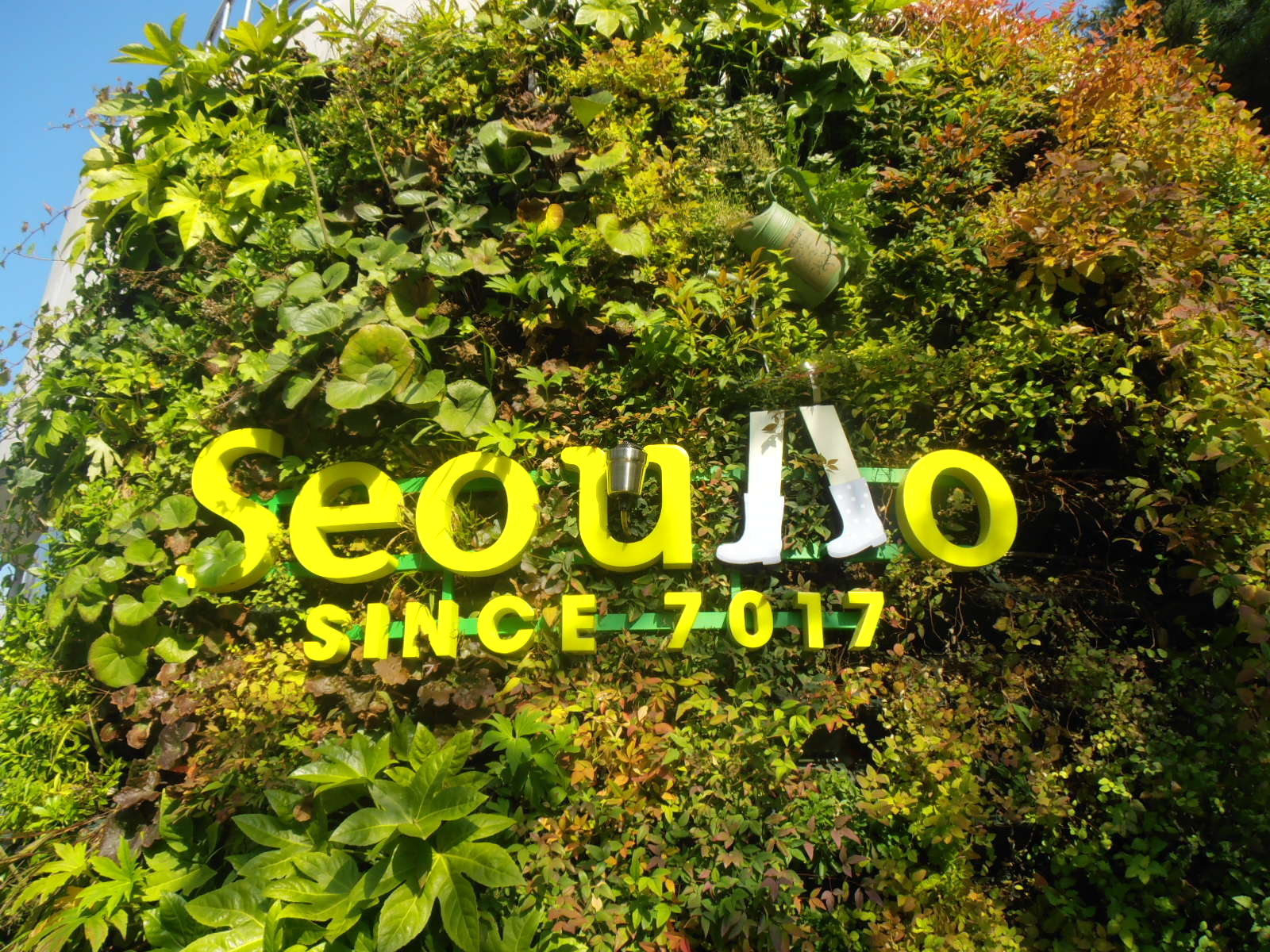

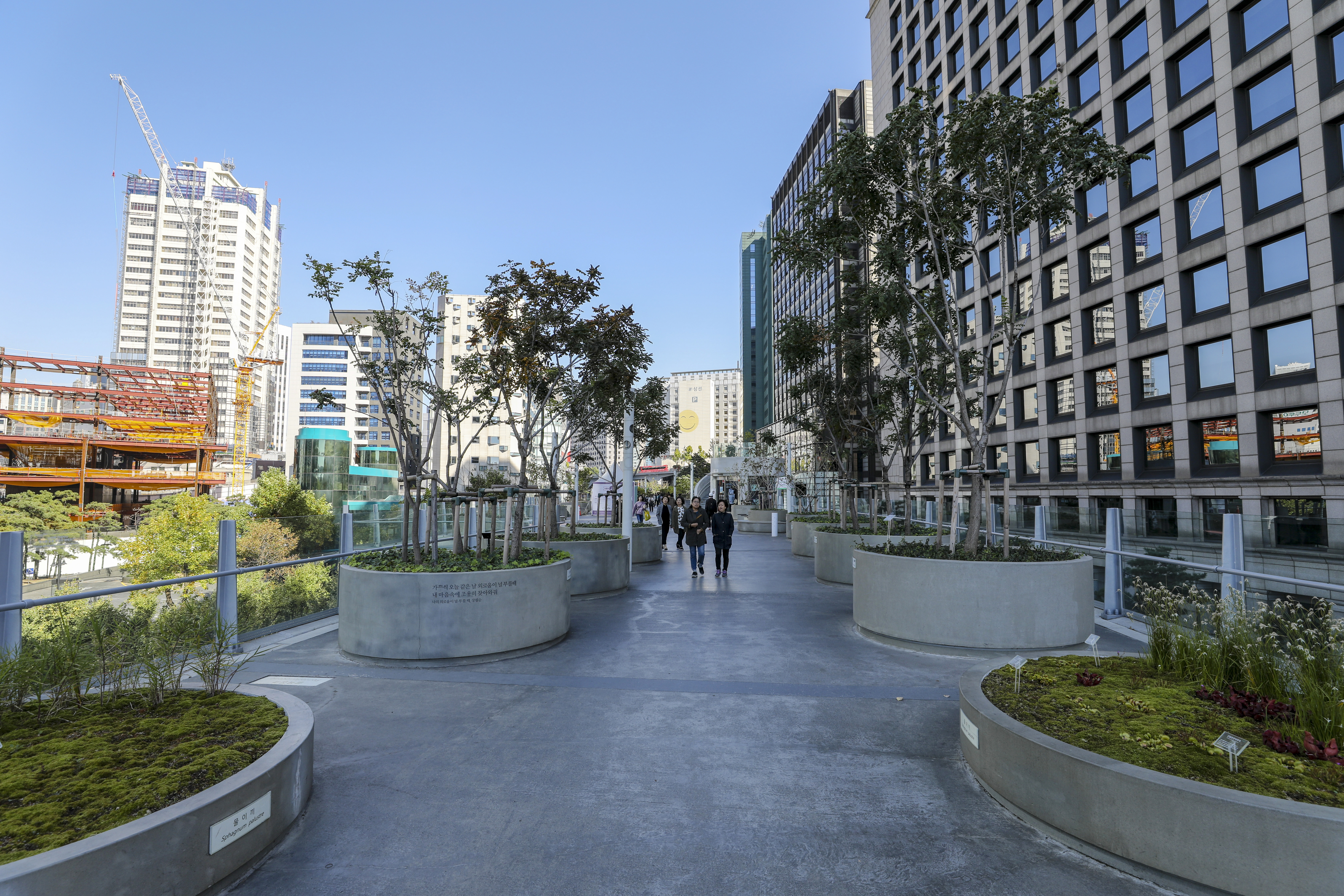

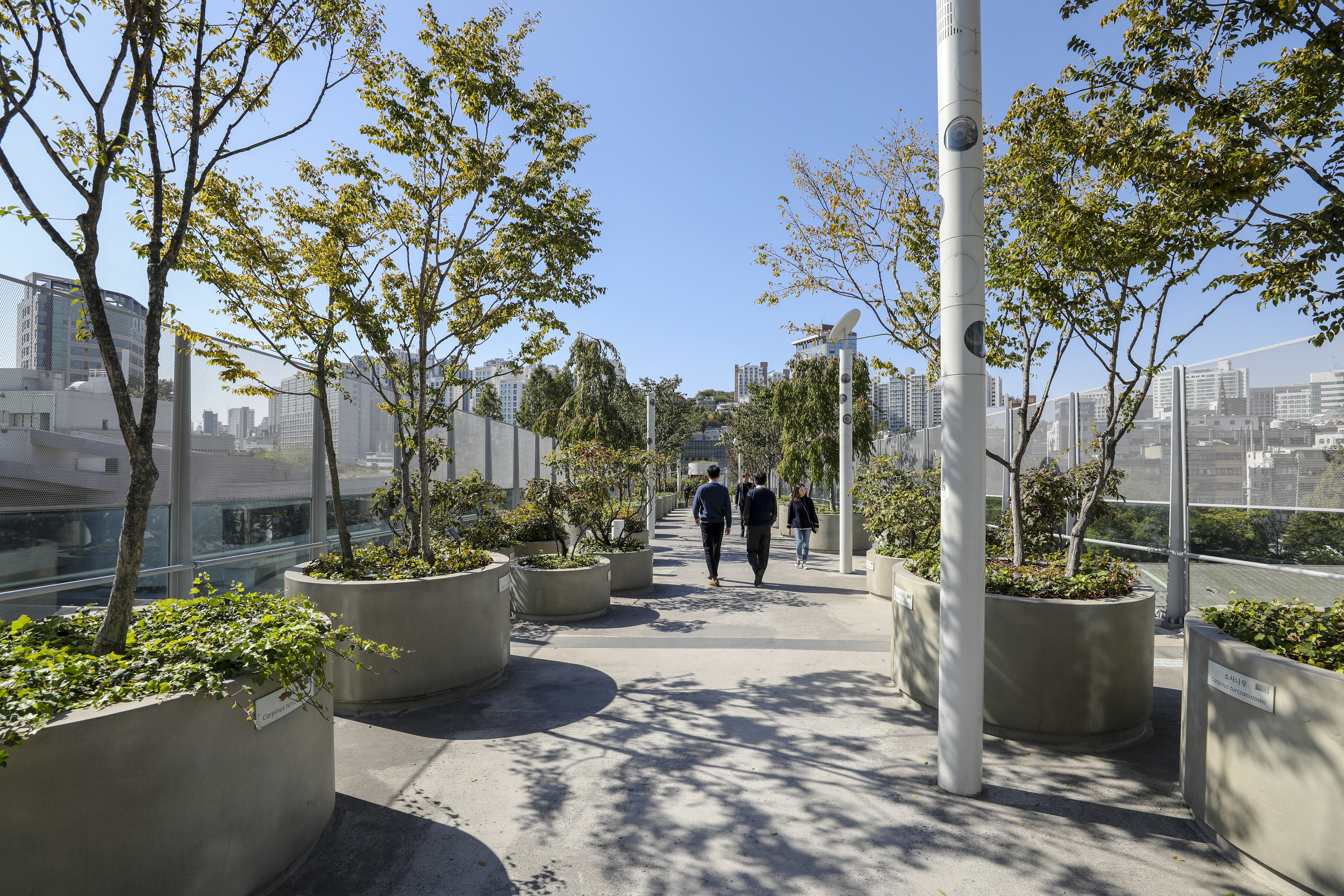

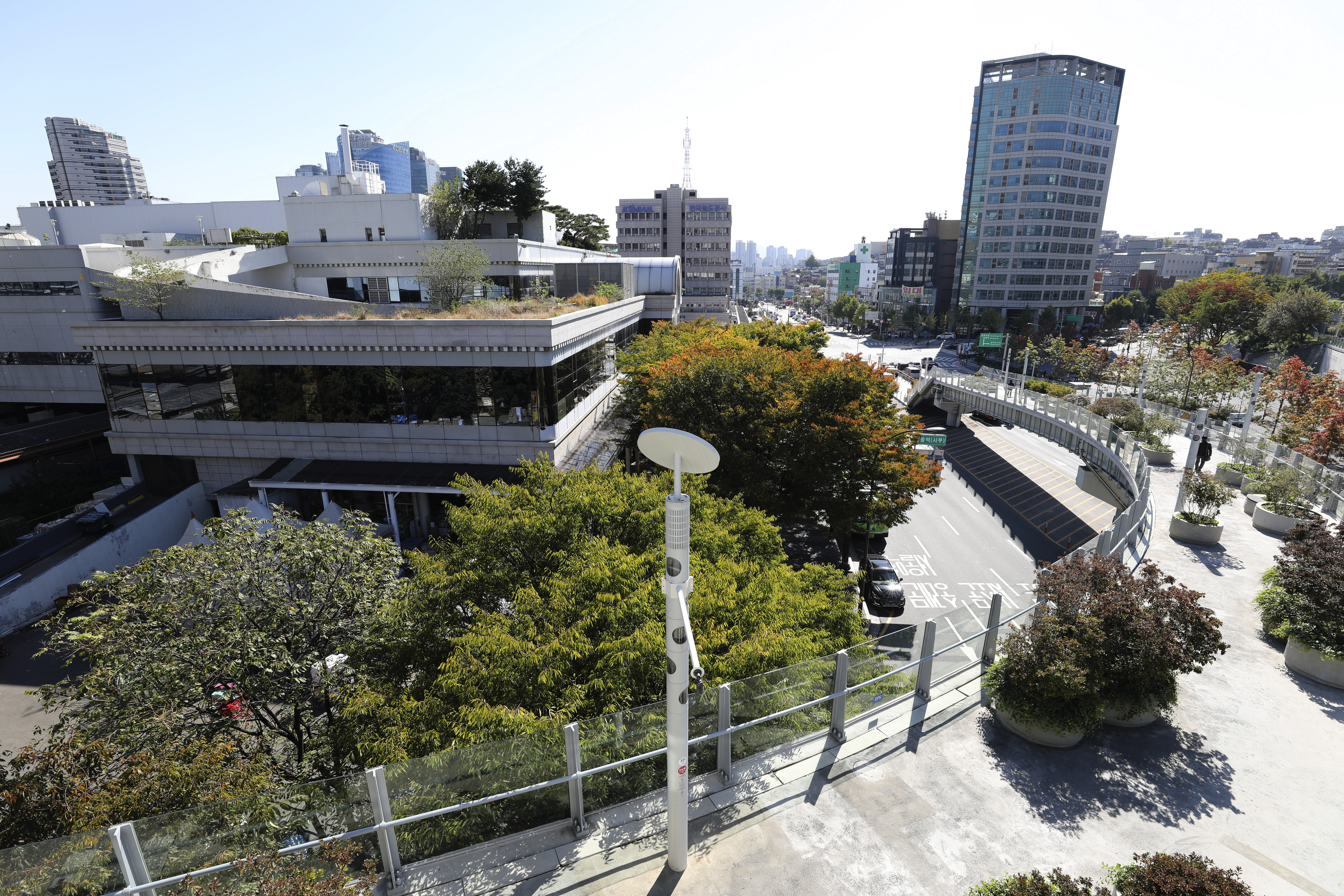

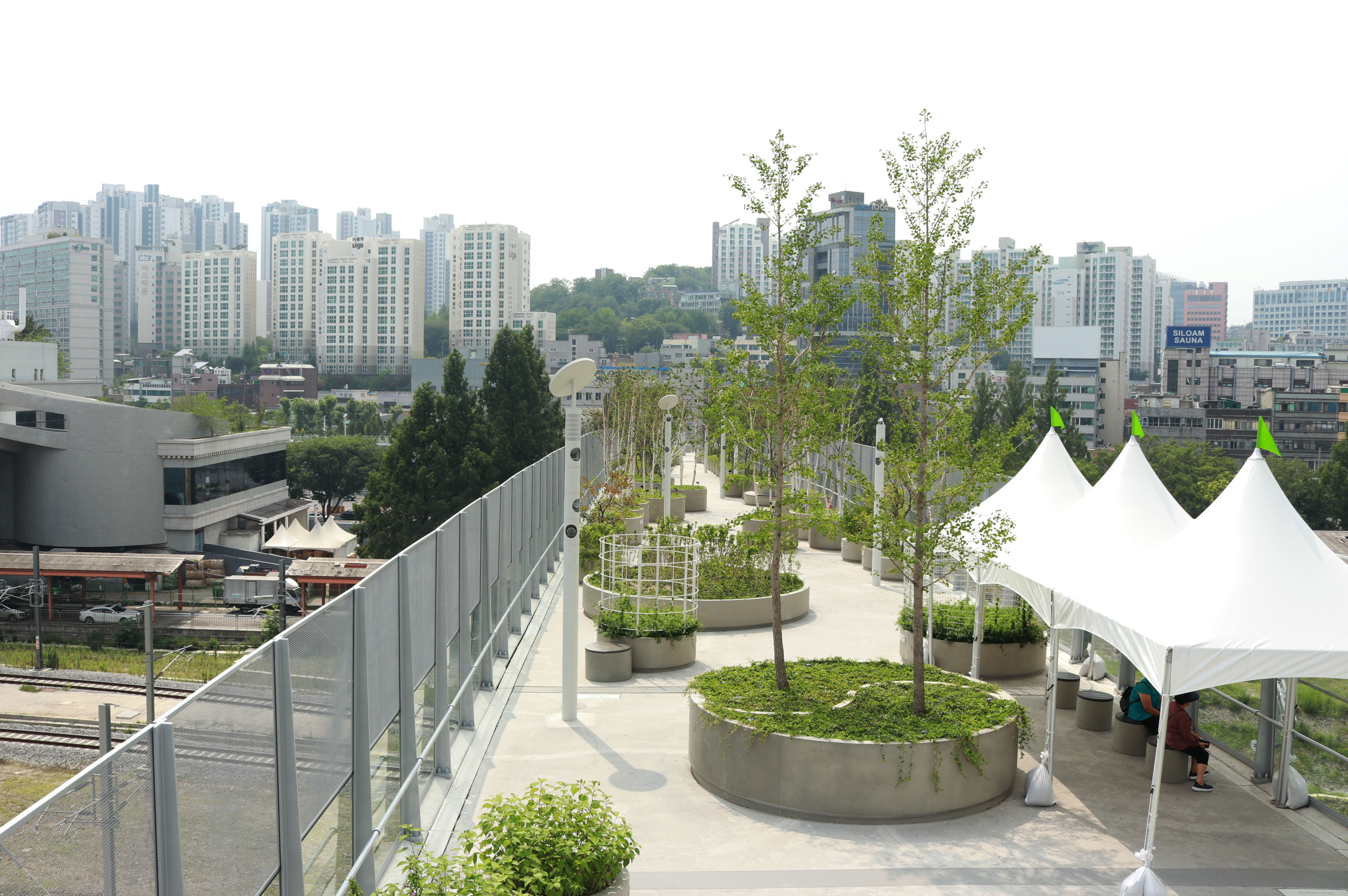

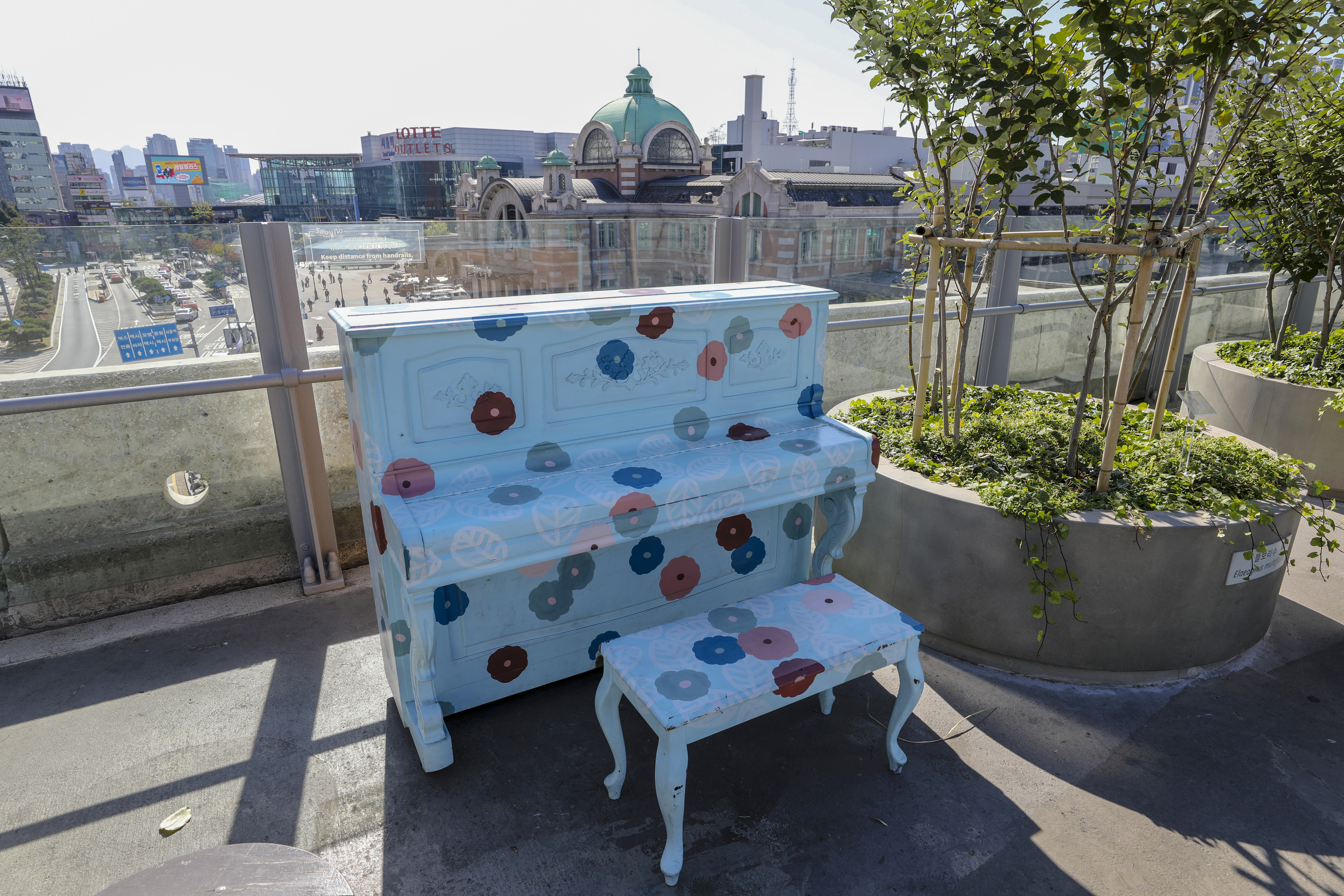

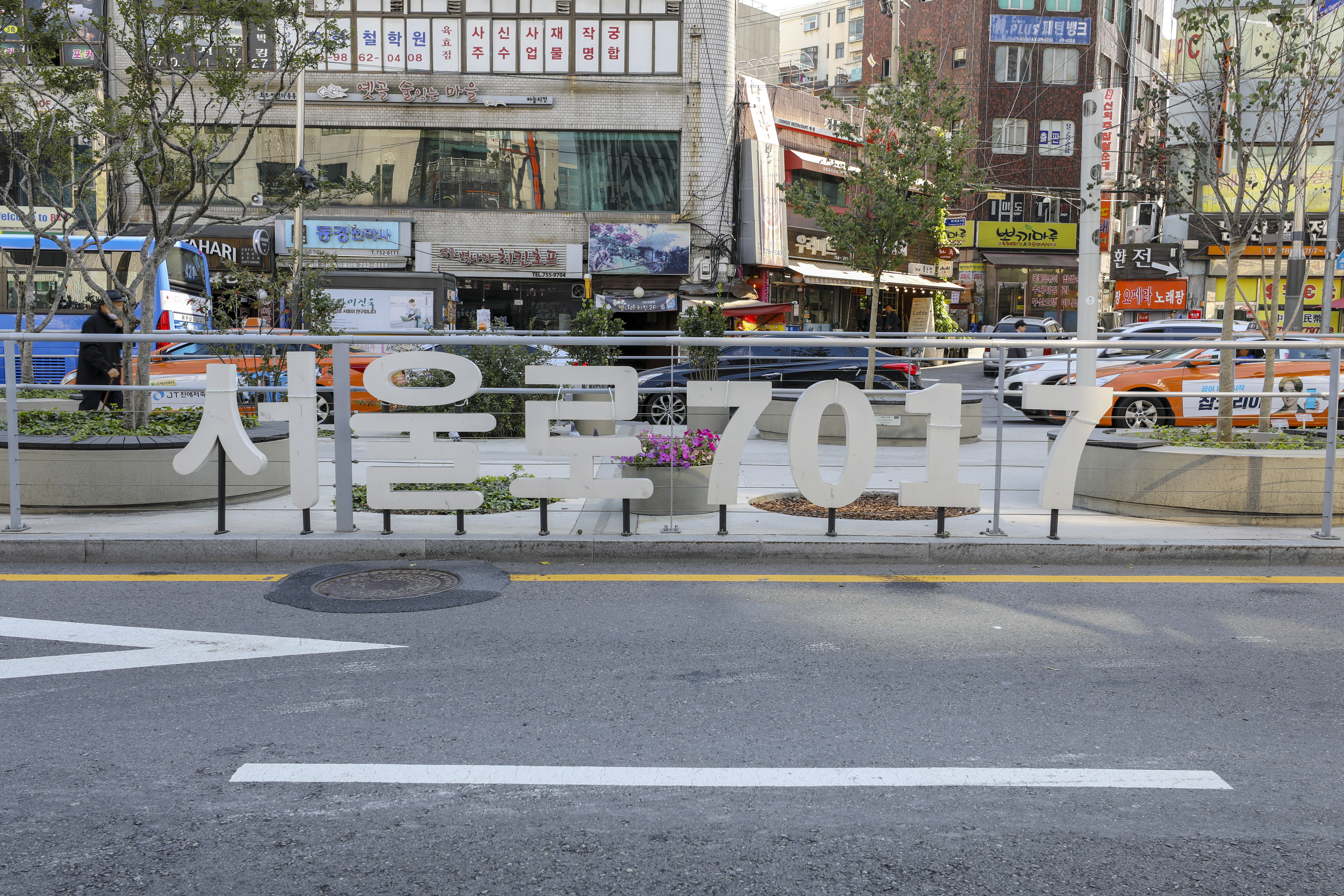

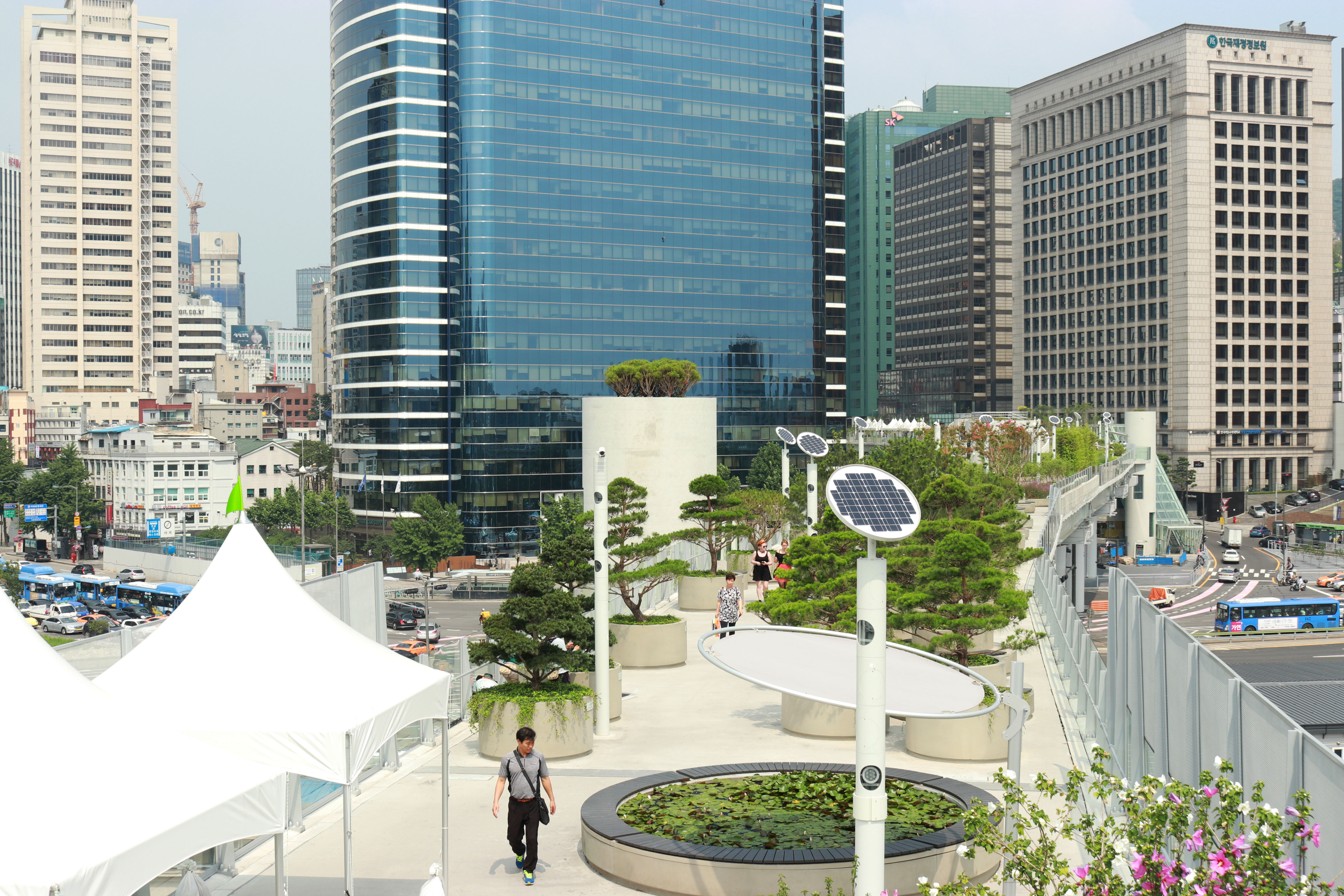

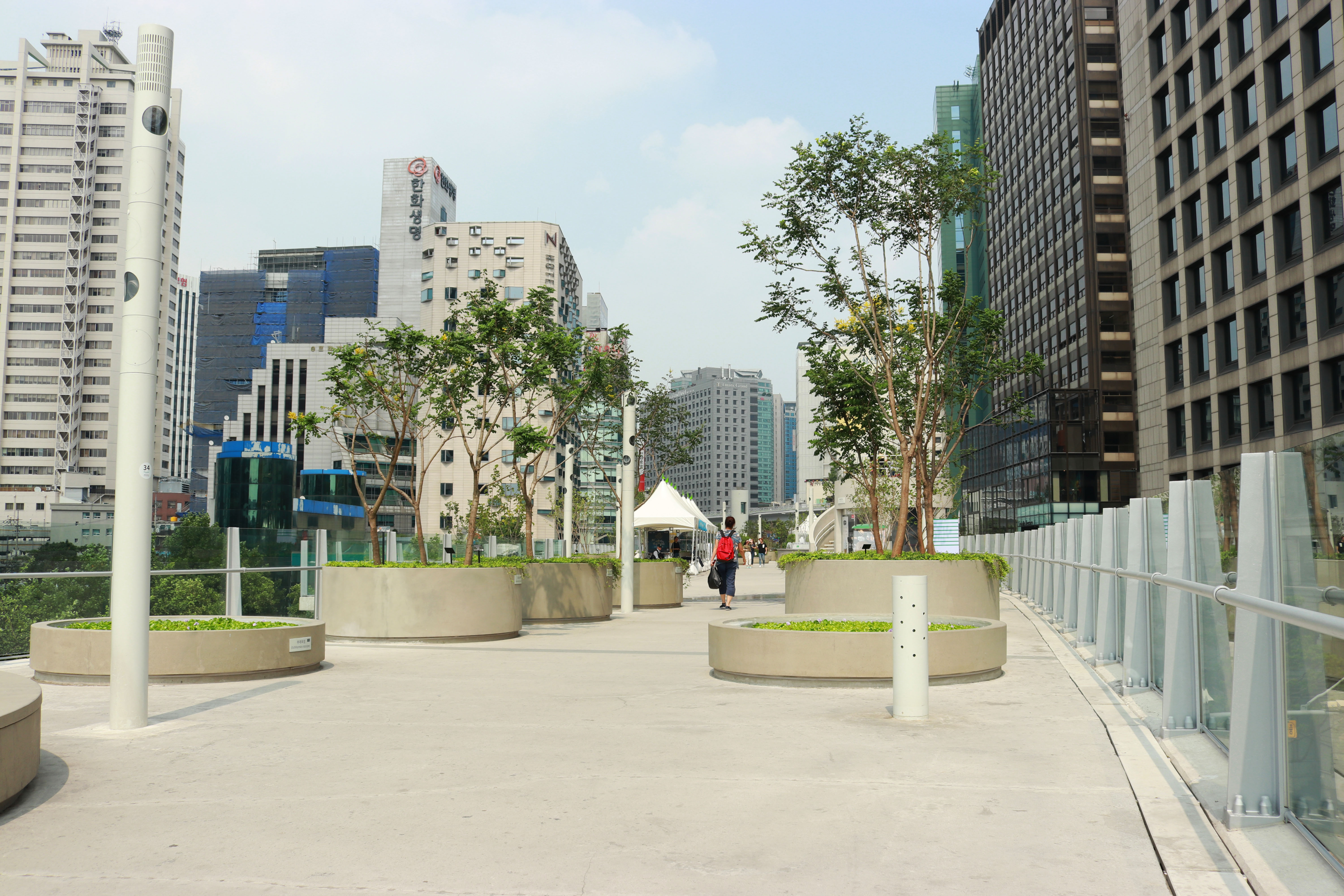

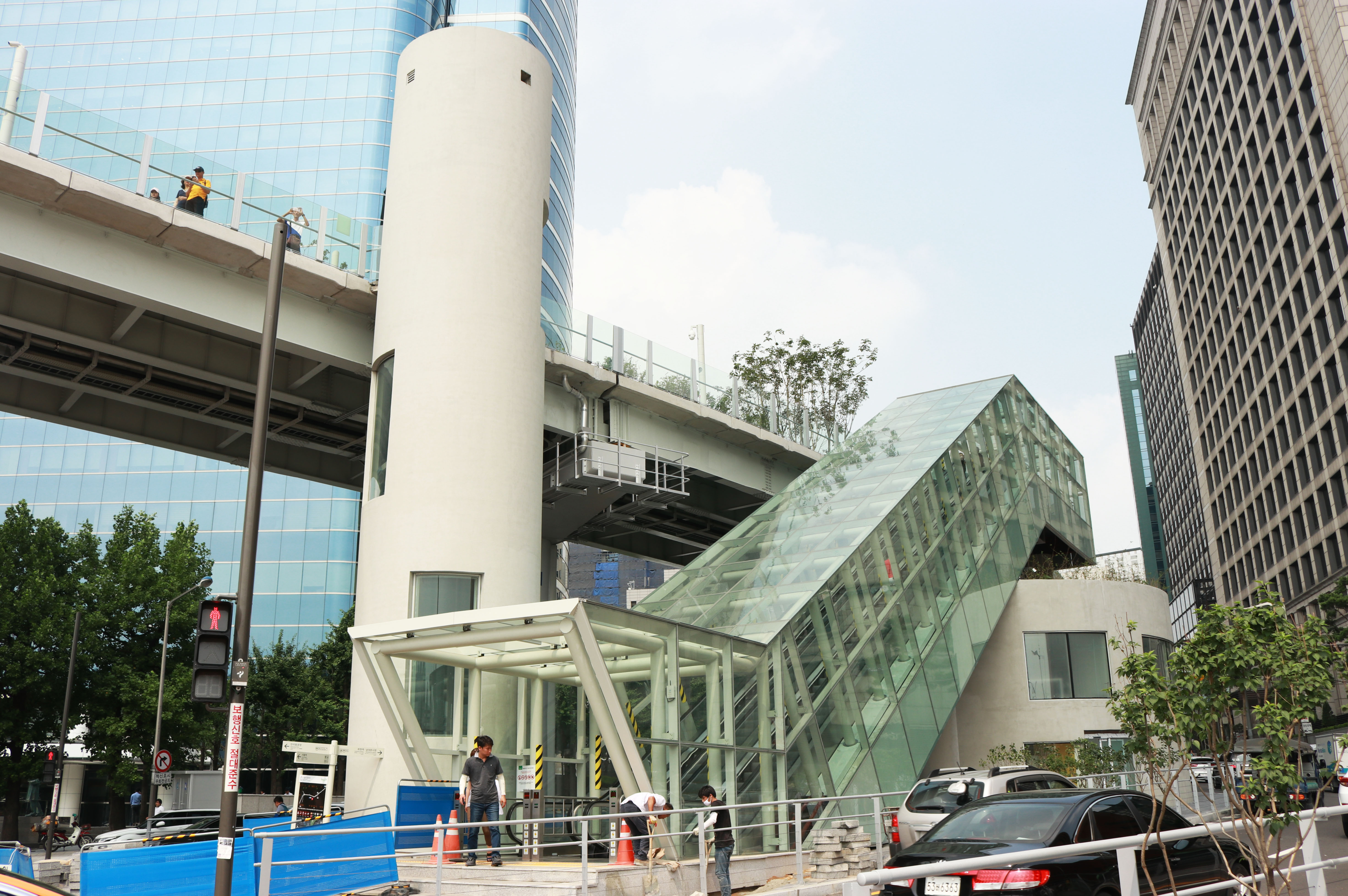

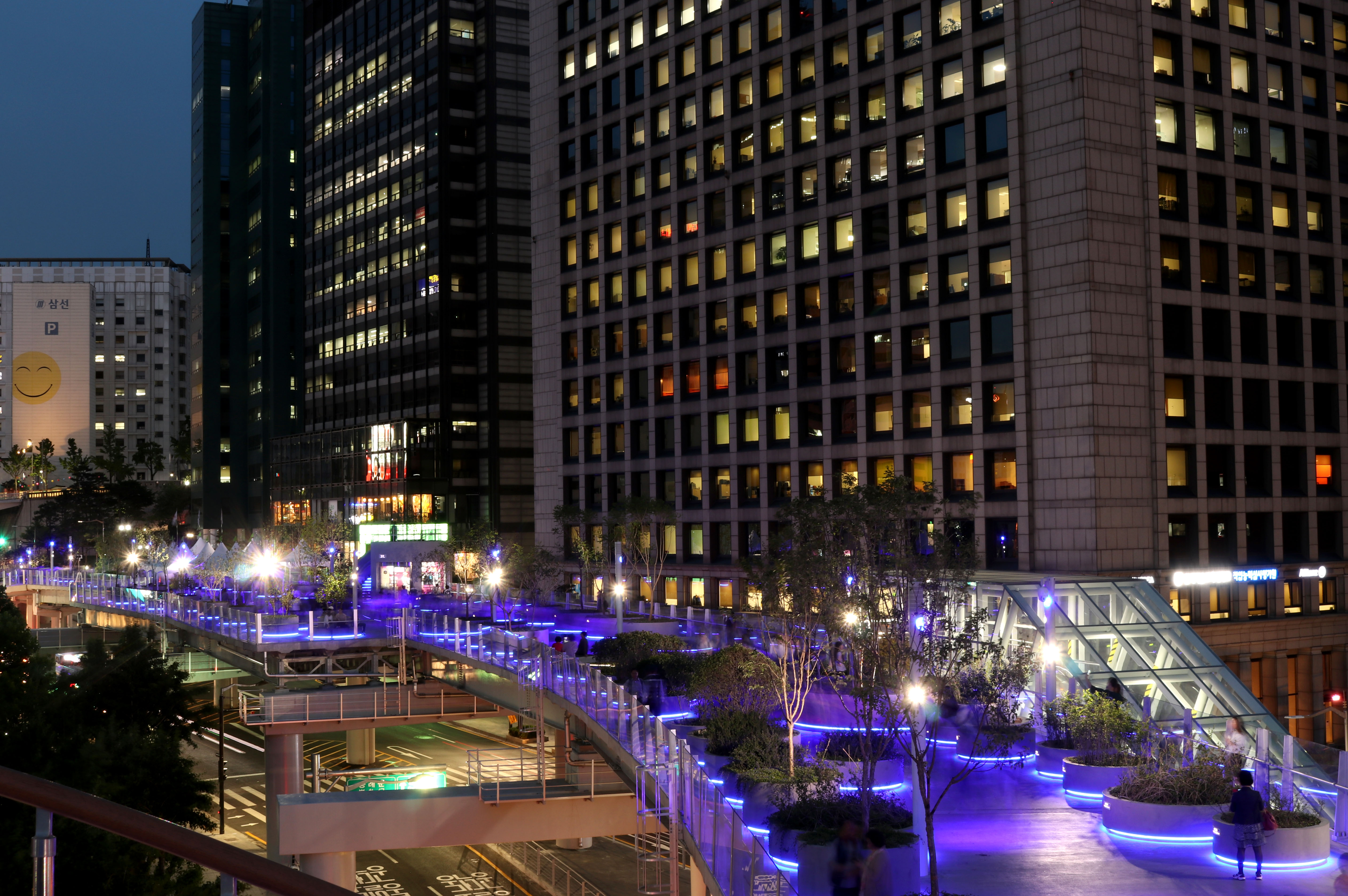

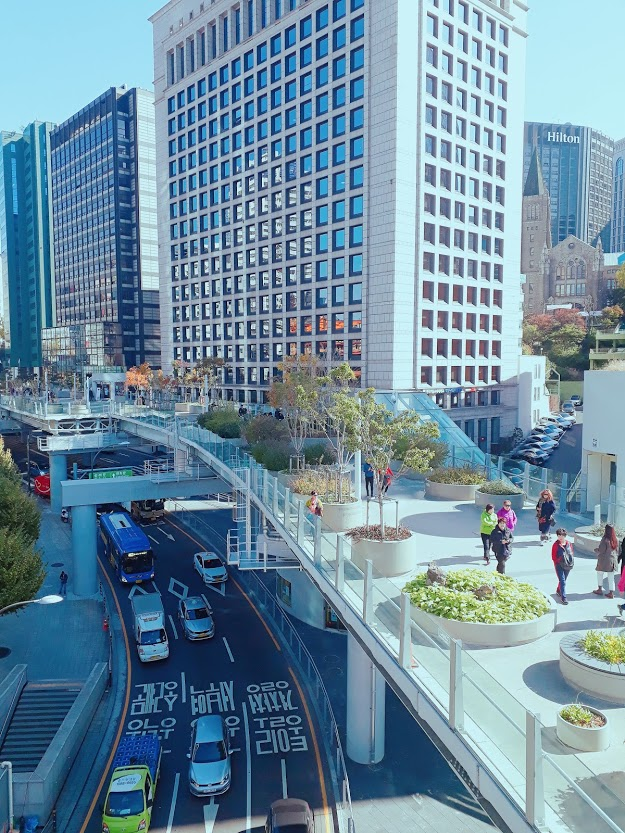

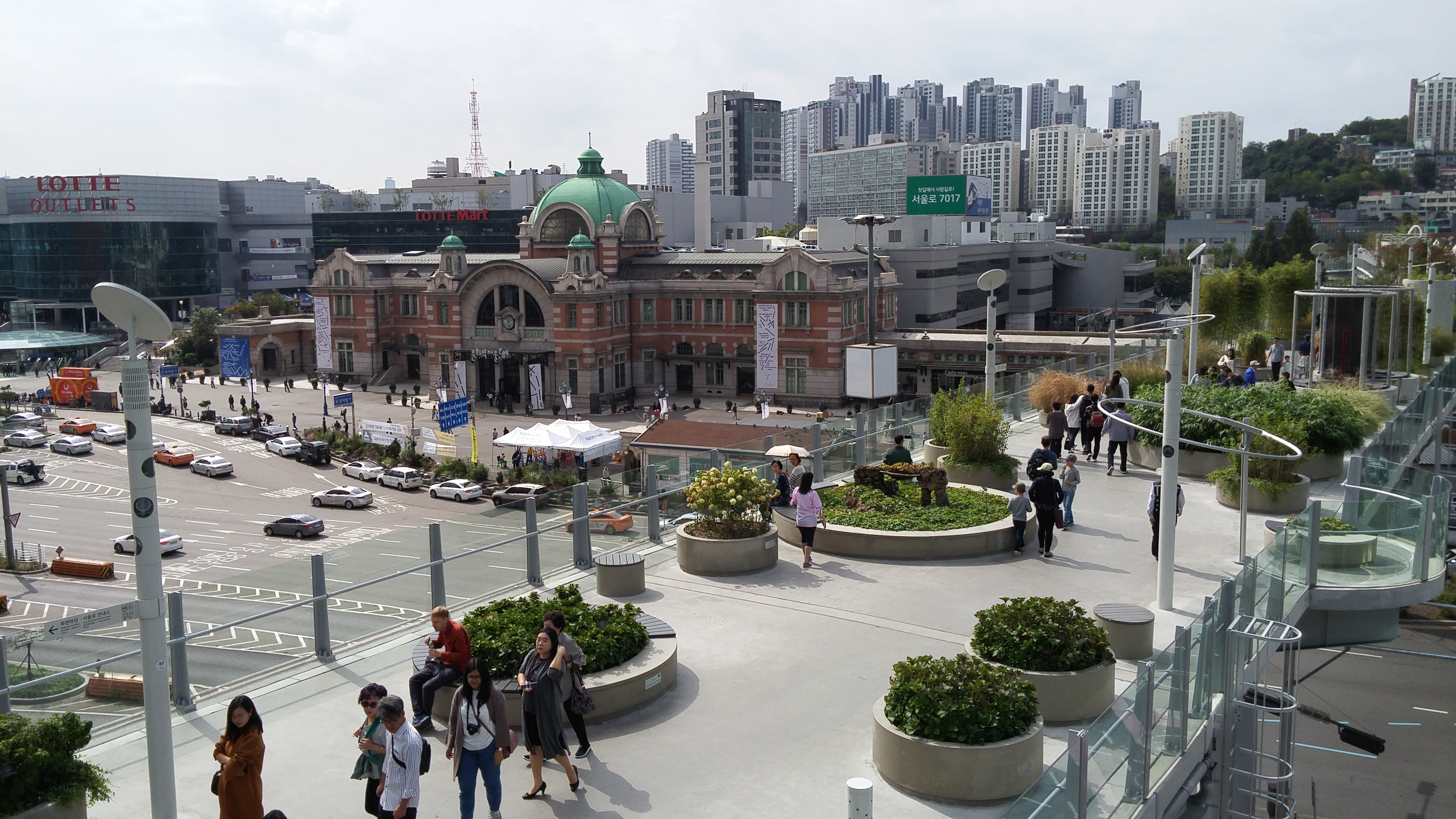

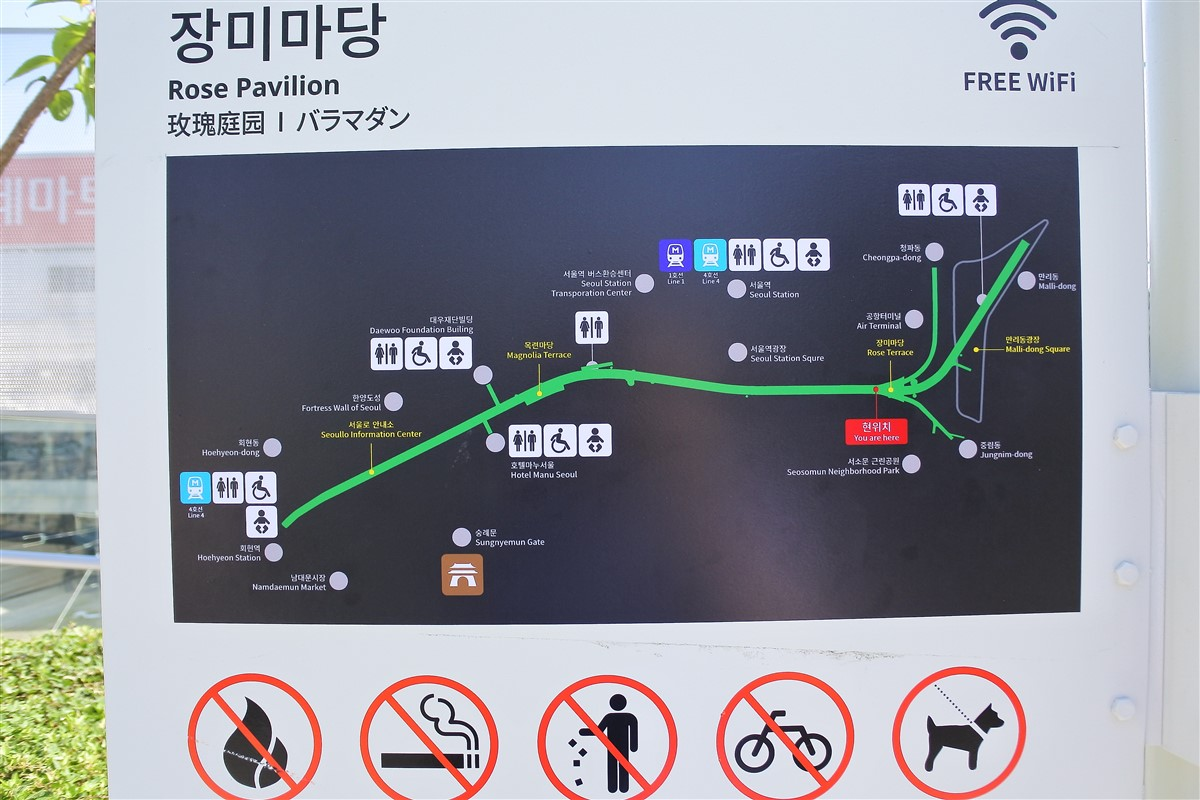

== See also ==
- High Line
- Bloomingdale Trail
