= The Amazing Race Australia 2 =

- Season 2
- Presented by: Grant Bowler
- No. of teams: 11
- Winners: Shane Haw & Andrew Thoday
- No. of legs: 12
- Distance traveled: 65,000 km (40,000 mi)
- No. of episodes: 12

Release
- Original network: Seven Network
- Original release: 30 May – 15 August 2012

Additional information
- Filming dates: 18 November – 13 December 2011

Series chronology
- ← Previous; Season 1 Next → Australia v New Zealand

The Amazing Race Australia 2 is the second season of The Amazing Race Australia, an Australian reality competition show based on the American series The Amazing Race. Hosted by Grant Bowler, it featured eleven teams of two, each with a pre-existing relationship, in a race around the world to win the grand prize of A$250,000. The show was produced by activeTV Australia.

This season visited five continents and nine countries and travelled over 65,000 kilometres (40,000 mi) during twelve legs. Starting in Sydney, racers travelled through the Philippines, India, the United Arab Emirates, Turkey, France, Cuba, Canada and China before returning to Australia and finishing in Fraser Island. New twists introduced in this season include the U-Turn Vote, the Anonymous U-Turn, the Yield and the Salvage Pass, which was awarded to the winners of the first leg and gave them a choice between a one-hour head start or saving the last team from elimination. This season premiered on Australia's Seven Network on 30 May 2012, one week after the last episode of the twentieth season of the American version aired in Australia. The show moved back to its old Monday schedule at 7:30 p.m. on 25 June 2012. The season then concluded on 15 August 2012.

Police officers Shane Haw and Andrew Thoday were the winners of this season, while workmates Paul Montgomery and Steve Scale finished in second place and cheerleader twins Michelle and Jo Troy finished in third place.

== Production ==
=== Filming and Development ===
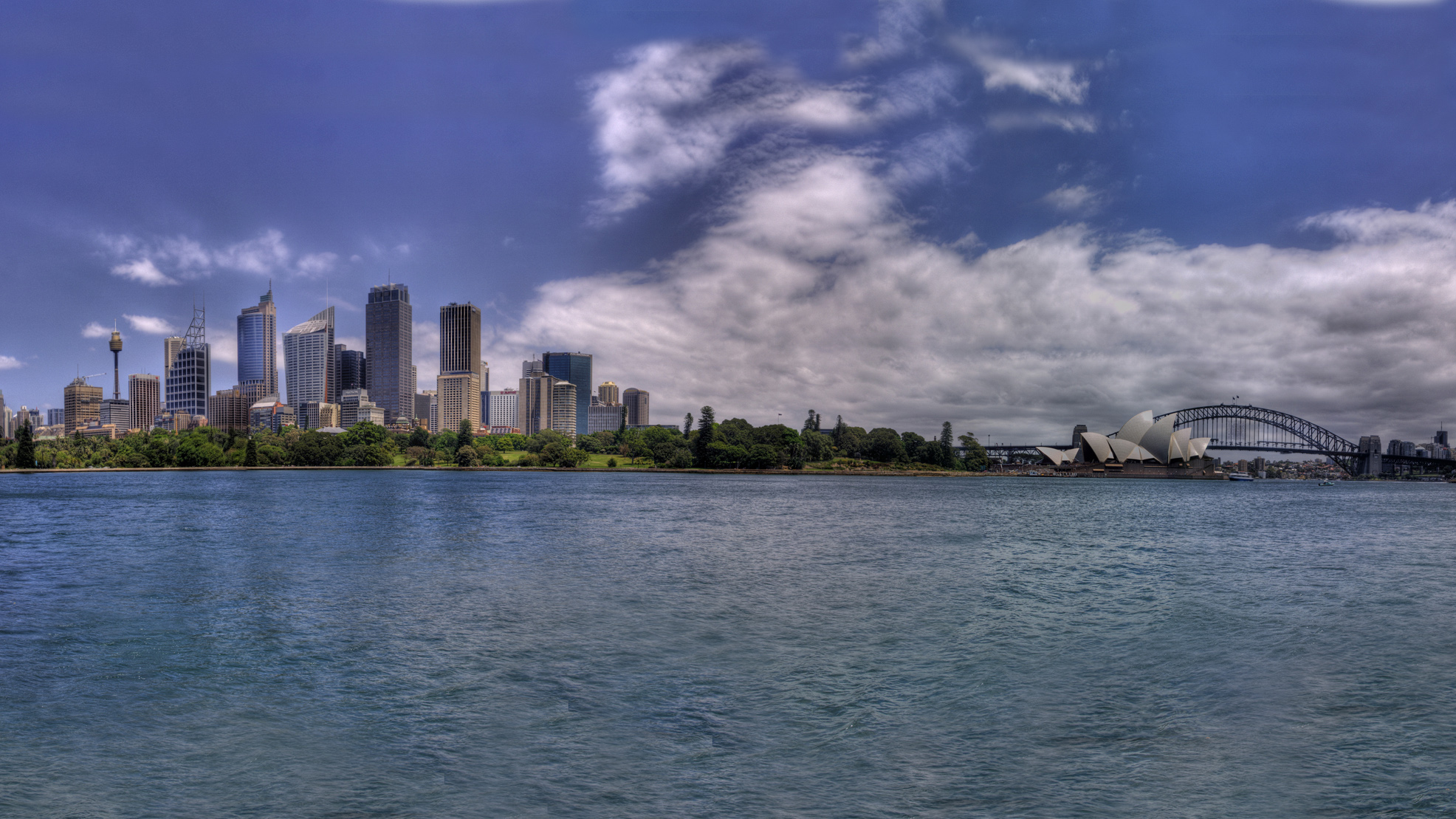
The 2nd season of The Amazing Race Australia started at the eastern approach of the Royal Botanic Garden alongside Farm Cove overlooking the Sydney Harbour skyline.

On 17 July 2011, the Seven Network announced that the show was renewed for a second edition.

Filming began on 18 November 2011, in Sydney. This season travelled across four continents, nine countries and 17 cities and was over 65,000 kilometres (40,000 mi) long. The 2012 edition marked a first time visit by a Eurasian or Australian edition of the franchise to the Americas, including the first visit by an Amazing Race franchise to the nation of Cuba, a country the original American edition couldn't visit at the time as the United States embargo against Cuba prevented Americans from visiting the island.

Three new twists were introduced in this season. The Salvage Pass was awarded in the first leg, giving the recipient team a choice between a one-hour head start or saving the last team from elimination in that leg. A U-Turn vote in the fourth leg required all teams to vote for the team to be U-Turned at the start of the leg and an anonymous U-Turn in the fifth leg, where the team who elected to use it would remain anonymous. In the sixth leg, a Yield was present for the first time in the Australian version.

=== Casting ===
Applications for the season ended on 19 August 2011.

=== Broadcasting ===
The show was on hiatus from 30 July to 6 August 2012 to avoid clashing with the 2012 Summer Olympics. The final three episodes aired from 13 August 2012 on consecutive nights.

=== Marketing ===
Honda, Bing Lee and PUMP Water continued their sponsorship. The new sponsors for this series were Zuji Australia, a sister company of Travelocity at the time, and Swisse Vitamins.

== Cast ==
On 20 April 2012, the teams were announced by the Seven Network. The cast included Indigenous Australian cousins, cops, a pair of hairdressers, identical twins and St. George Illawarra Dragons cheerleaders Michelle and Jo Troy, former Australian rules footballer Ross Thornton and his daughter Tarryn, and the franchise's first disabled contestant, Sticky, who was born without a left forearm. Lucy & Emilia were originally cast for the previous series, but dropped out at the last minute after their mother was diagnosed with cancer.

Contestants	Age	Relationship	Hometown	Status
Adam Corowa	30	Cousins	Coolangatta, Queensland	Eliminated 1st (in Delhi, India)
Dane Corowa	29	Cousins	Tweed Heads, New South Wales	Eliminated 1st (in Delhi, India)
Sue Bumback	40	Hairdressers	Geraldton, Western Australia	Eliminated 2nd (in Jaipur, India)
Teresa Italiano	44	Hairdressers	Geraldton, Western Australia	Eliminated 2nd (in Jaipur, India)
Kym Bouckaert	46	Engaged	Brisbane, Queensland	Eliminated 3rd (in Dubai, United Arab Emirates)
Donna Verney	42	Engaged	Brisbane, Queensland	Eliminated 3rd (in Dubai, United Arab Emirates)
Ross Thornton	55	Father & Daughter	Melbourne, Victoria	Eliminated 4th (in Istanbul, Turkey)
Tarryn Thornton	25	Father & Daughter	Melbourne, Victoria	Eliminated 4th (in Istanbul, Turkey)
Geoff "Sticky" Stick	24	Flatmates	Launceston, Tasmania	Eliminated 5th (in Ciénaga de Zapata, Cuba)
Sam Hay	24	Flatmates	Launceston, Tasmania	Eliminated 5th (in Ciénaga de Zapata, Cuba)
James Kingsbury	23	Dating	Melbourne, Victoria	Eliminated 6th (in Vancouver, Canada)
Sarah Roza	32	Dating	Melbourne, Victoria	Eliminated 6th (in Vancouver, Canada)
Lucy Pelosi	36	Sisters	Sydney, New South Wales	Eliminated 7th (in Banff, Canada)
Emilia Pelosi	30	Sisters	Sydney, New South Wales	Eliminated 7th (in Banff, Canada)
Joseph Caristo	22	Brother & Sister	Sydney, New South Wales	Eliminated 8th (in Inner Mongolia, China)
Grace Caristo	21	Brother & Sister	Sydney, New South Wales	Eliminated 8th (in Inner Mongolia, China)
Michelle Troy	26	Cheerleader Twins	Sydney, New South Wales	Third place
Jo Troy	26	Cheerleader Twins	Sydney, New South Wales	Third place
Paul Montgomery	27	Workmates	Melbourne, Victoria	Runners-up
Steve Scale	29	Workmates	Melbourne, Victoria	Runners-up
Shane Haw	43	Cops	Melbourne, Victoria	Winners
Andrew Thoday	35	Cops	Melbourne, Victoria	Winners

Future appearances

In 2018, Sarah Roza appeared on the fifth season of Married at First Sight. In 2025, Shane Haw participated in Deal or No Deal, with Andrew Thoday joining Shane as his companion on the podium.

== Results ==
The following teams are listed with their placements in each leg. Placements are listed in finishing order.

- A red placement with a dagger (†) indicates that the team was eliminated.
- An underlined blue placement with a double-dagger (‡) indicates that the team was the last to arrive at a Pit Stop in a non-elimination leg and was "marked for elimination" in the following leg. (Note: A team that is "marked for elimination" must check in at the Pit Stop in first place; otherwise they would receive a 30-minute penalty.)
- An italicized purple placement indicates that the team was the last to arrive at a Pit Stop, but were saved by a team with the Salvage Pass.
- An italicized and underlined placement indicates that the team was the last to arrive at a Pit Stop, but there was no rest period at the Pit Stop and all teams were instructed to continue racing.
- A green ƒ indicates that the team won the Fast Forward.
- A brown ⊃ indicates that the team used the U-Turn and a brown ⊂ indicates the team on the receiving end of the U-Turn.
- A brown > indicates that the team used the Yield and a brown < indicates the team on the receiving end of the Yield.
- A purple ε indicates that the team used an Express Pass on that leg to bypass one of their tasks.
- A violet + indicates that the teams encountered an Intersection.
- A purple § indicates that the team used their Salvage advantage.

Team placement (by leg)
Team	1	2	3	4	5	6+ (Note: This leg featured an Intersection. The teams were paired up thusly: Paul & Steve and Michelle & Jo, Joseph & Grace and Sticky & Sam, Lucy & Emilia and Shane & Andrew, and James & Sarah and Ross & Tarryn.)	7	8	9	10	11	12
Shane & Andrew	8th	7th	6th	5th	5th⊃ (Note: Shane & Andrew chose to use the U-Turn on Paul & Steve.)	6th	3rd	2nd	2nd	1st	3rd	1st
Paul & Steve	10th	6th	5th (Note: The starting placements for Kym & Donna and Paul & Steve were switched after the second leg. Kym & Donna and Paul & Steve finished leg 2 in 6th and 5th place respectively, but began leg 3 in 5th and 6th place, respectively. No explanation was given for this switch.)	6th⊂ (Note: In leg 4, the teams voted for the team to be U-Turned; Paul & Steve received the most votes.)	1st⊂	1st> (Note: Paul & Steve chose to Yield Michelle & Jo.)	1st	1st	1stƒ (Note: This team won the Fast Forward on this leg.)	4th	2nd	2nd
Michelle & Jo	7th	2nd	3rd	4th	2nd	2nd<	2nd	3rd	3rd	3rd	1st	3rd
Joseph & Grace	6th	8th	7th	3rd	4th	3rd	7th (Note: This team arrived last at the Pit Stop, but they were instructed to continue racing.) (Note: Joseph & Grace initially arrived 6th, but were issued a 2-hour penalty for pulling another team's belongings out of the taxi. Sticky & Sam checked in during this penalty time, dropping Joseph & Grace to last.)	6th	4th	2nd	4th†	
Lucy & Emilia	11th (Note: Ross & Tarryn used their Salvage advantage to save Lucy & Emilia from elimination.)	10th	9th	8th	6th	5th	5th	5th	5th	5th†		
James & Sarah	3rd	9th	8th	1st	7th (Note: James & Sarah initially arrived 6th, but were issued a 4-hour penalty for quitting the Roadblock. Lucy & Emilia checked in during this penalty time, dropping James & Sarah to 7th. Ross & Tarryn also arrived during this penalty time, but as they had also quit the Roadblock, they remained in last place.)	7th	4th	4th	6th†			
Sticky & Sam	5th	1st	1st	2nd	3rd	4th	6thε (Note: This team used their Express Pass to bypass one of the tasks on this leg.)	7th†⊂ (Note: Sticky & Sam were U-Turned on this leg.)				
Ross & Tarryn	1st§	4th	2nd	7th	8th‡	8th†						
Kym & Donna	2nd	5th	4th	9th†								
Sue & Teresa	4th	3rd	10th†									
Adam & Dane	9th	11th† (Note: Adam & Dane initially arrived 7th, but were issued a 30-minute penalty for selling their possessions. All of the remaining teams checked in during this penalty time, dropping Adam & Dane to last.)										

== Race summary ==
The route of The Amazing Race Australia 2.

Destinations	Air travel Rail travel Water travel Bus travel Helicopter travel Bicycle travel Gondola travel
Route Markers	Detour Roadblock Fast Forward U-Turn Yield Intersection Pit Stop

=== Leg 1 (Australia → Philippines) ===
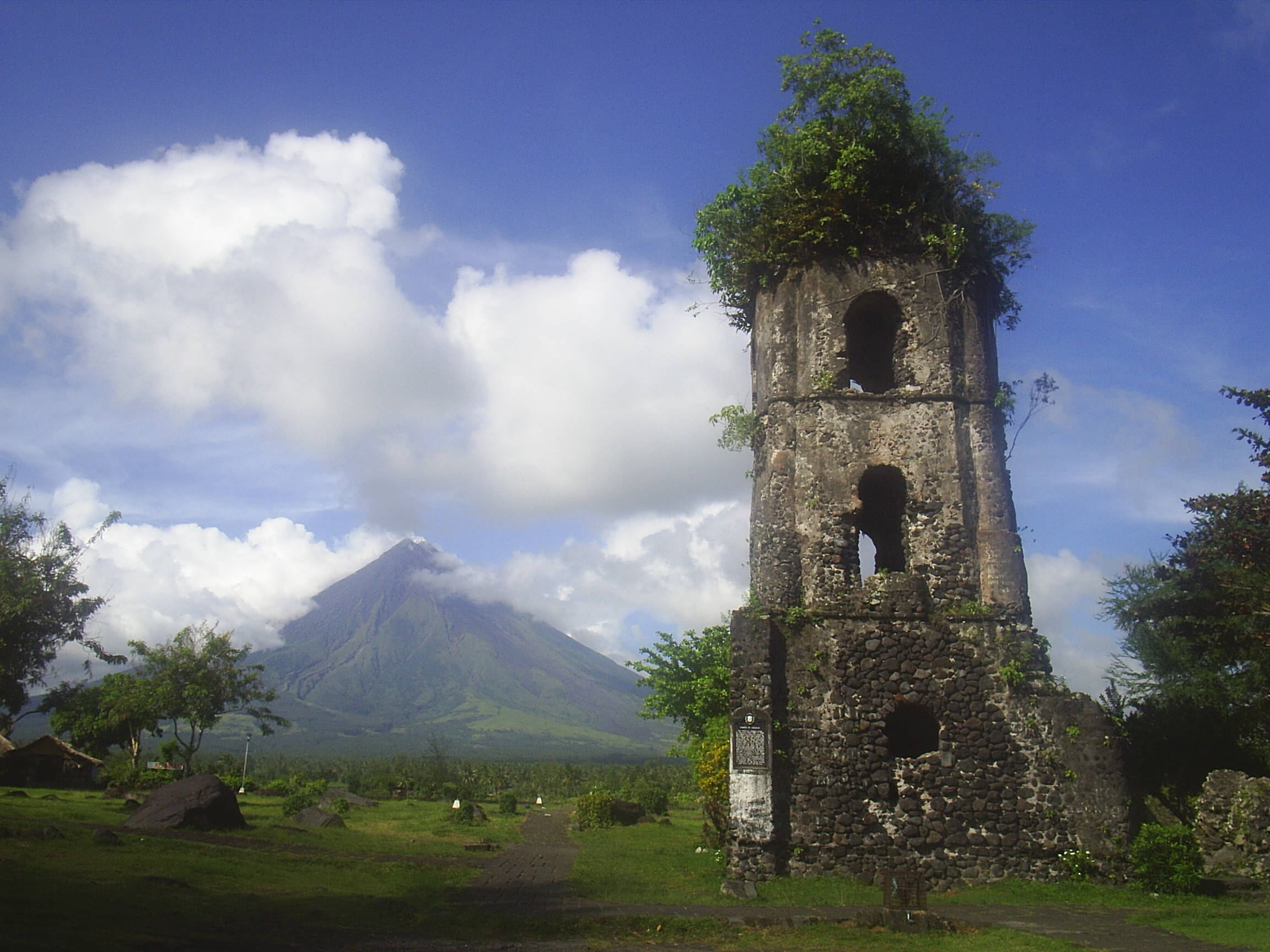
In the Philippines, teams visited the Cagsawa Ruins in Albay province overlooking the Mayon Volcano, where they had to find a snake charmer.

- Episode 1: "Don't Need More Friends, Always Need More Money" (30 May 2012)
- Prizes: A$10,000 and the Salvage Pass (awarded to Ross & Tarryn)

Locations

- Sydney, Australia (Royal Botanic Garden) (Starting Line)
- Sydney (Man O'War Steps → Barangaroo Wharf)
- Sydney → Manila, Philippines
- Manila (Plaza Miranda)
- Quezon City (Bicol Isarog TSI Bus Terminal) → Daraga (Cagsawa Ruins)
- Daraga (Cagsawa Ruins) → Bacacay (Luyang Beach)
- Bacacay (Luyang Beach → Mosboron Beach)

Episode summary

- Teams set off from the Royal Botanic Garden and made their way to the Man O'War Steps. From there, teams had to travel by boat, each of which carried only one team, to Barangaroo Wharf. They then had to remove a marked car from a large maze by moving the 24 surrounding black cars in either a forward or backward direction. Once they had freed a car, teams were given their next clue, which instructed them to fly to Manila, Philippines, and could drive themselves to Sydney Airport.
- Once in Manila, teams had to make their way to Plaza Miranda, where they had to find a marked stall and eat eight baluts before receiving their next clue. At the Bicol Isarog TSI bus terminal, teams had to sign up for one of three charter buses to Daraga. The first three teams were on the first bus, the next four teams on the second bus and the remaining teams on the last bus. Each bus left half an hour apart. Once in Daraga, teams had to find a snake charmer near the Cagsawa Ruins, who gave them their next clue.
- This season's first Detour was a choice between Jig or Pig. In Jig, teams had to don traditional costumes and then perform a traditional Ibalong Festival dance to the satisfaction of four judges before receiving their next clue. In Pig, teams had to compete in a game called Agawan Baboy (Catch the Oily Pig). After covering each other in oil, both team members had to enter a muddy pen, catch two pigs each for a total of four pigs and then put them in another pen before receiving their next clue.
- After the Detour, teams had to board a jeepney that took them to Luyang Beach in Bacacay, where they had to build a raft using provided materials and then paddle themselves to the Pit Stop at Mosboron Beach.

Additional note

- Lucy & Emilia arrived last at the Pit Stop; however, Ross & Tarryn used their Salvage Pass to save them from elimination.

=== Leg 2 (Philippines → India) ===
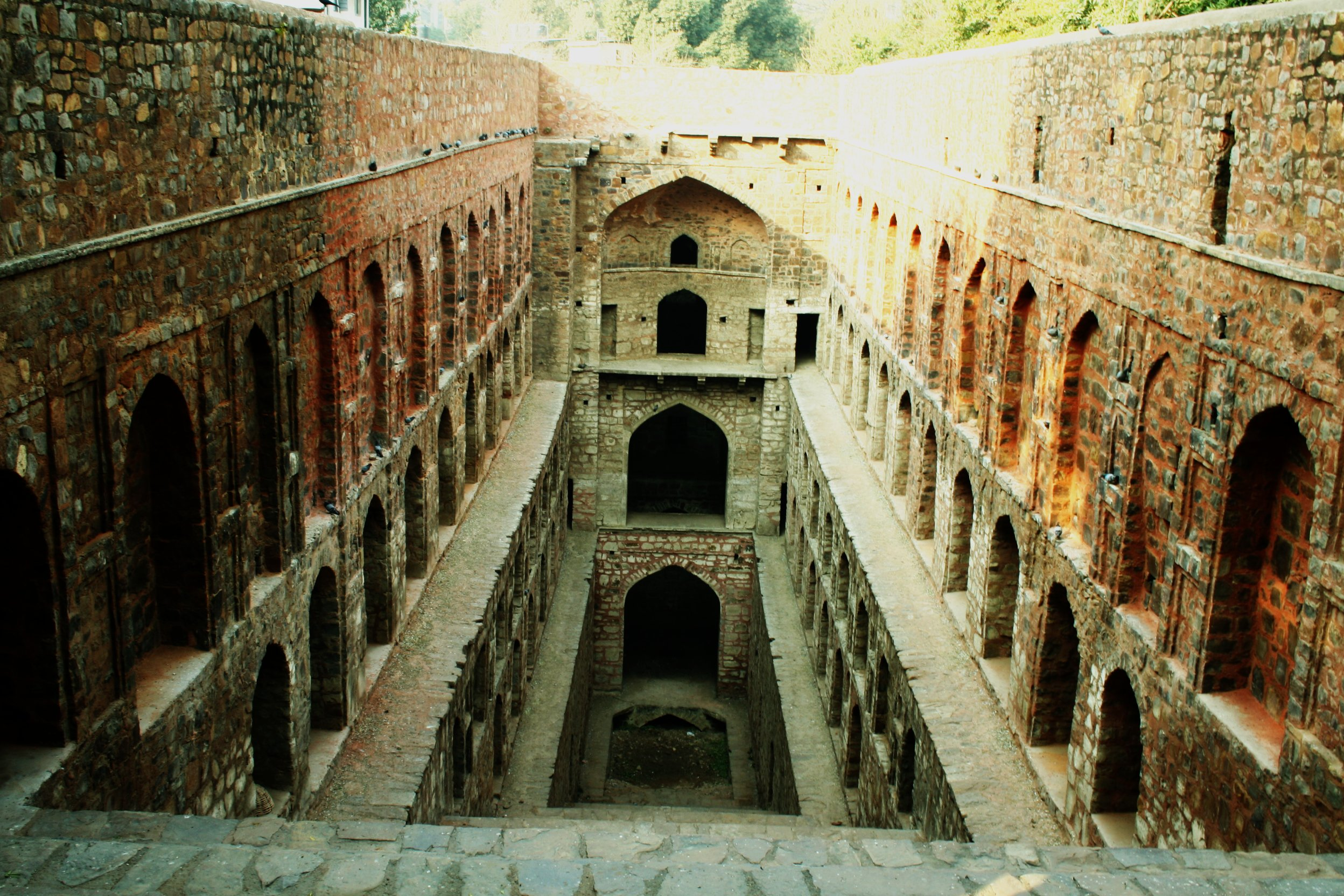
In Delhi, teams visited the historical stepwell of Agrasen Ki Baoli and searched through turbans.

- Episode 2: "We Only Picked Good Looking Ones" (6 June 2012)
- Prizes: A trip for two to the Japan MotoGP with VIP backstage passes and the Express Pass (awarded to Sticky & Sam)
- Eliminated: Adam & Dane

Locations

- Bacacay (Mosboron Beach)
- Bacacay (Misibis Bay Resort and Casino) → Manila
- Manila → Delhi, India
- Delhi (Agrasen Ki Baoli)
- Bhalswa (Jabbar and Laallu's Dairy)
- Delhi (Old Fort – Qila-i-Kuhna Mosque)
- Delhi (Khari Baoli) (Unaired)
- Delhi (Qutub Minar)

Episode summary

- At the start of this leg, teams were instructed to return by bus to Manila and then fly to Delhi, India. Once there, teams had to travel to the Agrasen Ki Baoli, where they had to search through a group of men wearing turbans for one who had the word CORRECT hidden within his turban to receive their next clue. If teams chose an incorrect turban, they had to re-wrap it before they could continue searching.
- This leg's Detour was a choice between Pull or Poo. In Pull, both team members had to milk a cow until they each collected a half-litre of milk, which they could exchange for their next clue. In Poo, teams had to make 50 fuel bricks out of cow dung and hay and then stick them to a wall before receiving their next clue.
- After the Detour, teams had to travel to the Qila-i-Kuhna Mosque in Delhi. There, teams had to perform a Bollywood dance and then recite a Hindi script to the director's satisfaction before receiving their next clue.
- Teams had to check in at the Pit Stop: Qutub Minar.

Additional notes

- In an unaired Roadblock, one team member had search Khari Baoli for a marked store, where they had to fill Hessian bags with chili peppers and then carry the bags through the market's alleyways and load them onto a cart before receiving their next clue.
- Sticky & Sam were awarded an Express Pass at the Pit Stop that was not mentioned in the episode but was briefly visible in Sticky's hand.

=== Leg 3 (India) ===
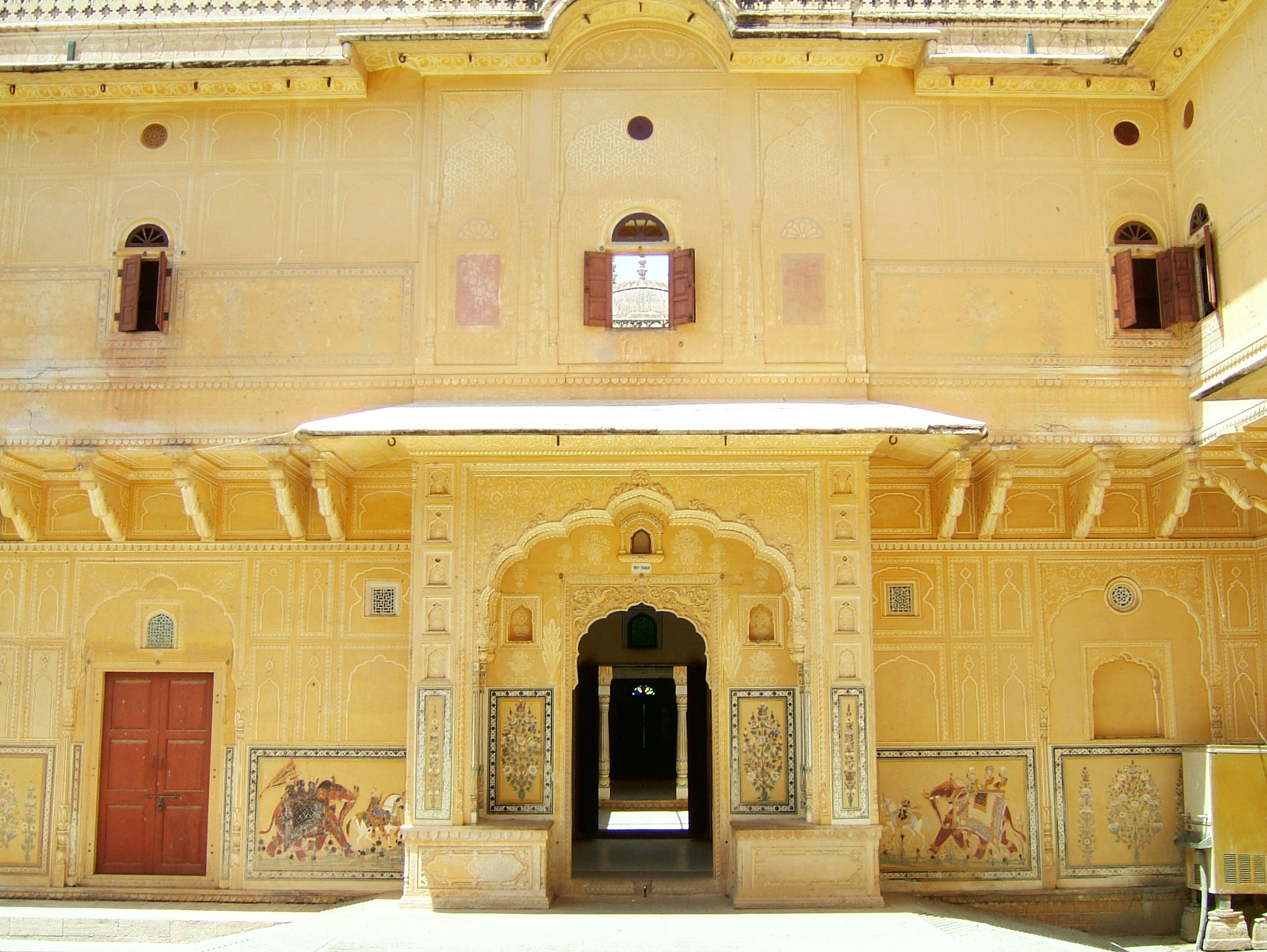
The Madhavendra Palace in Jaipur's Nahargarh Fort was this leg's Pit Stop.

- Episode 3: "I Don't Really Like to Use My Brain" (13 or 14 June 2012)
- Prize: A state of the art home entertainment package (awarded to Sticky & Sam)
- Eliminated: Sue & Teresa

Locations

- Delhi → Jaipur (Shiv Vilas)
- Jaipur (Red Elephant Temple) (Unaired)
- Jaipur (Bharat Driving and Maintenance Training School)
- Jaipur (Jaipur Market)
- Amber (Panna Meena ka Kund)
- Jaipur (Nahargarh Fort – Madhavendra Palace)

Episode summary

- During the Pit Stop, all teams were transported by bus to Shiv Vilas in Jaipur, where they began this leg. Once there, teams were instructed to travel to the Red Elephant Temple and receive a blessing from the priest before being given their next clue.
- In this season's first aired Roadblock, teams had to make their way to the Bharat Driving and Maintenance Training School, where one team member had to sit through a driver's education course on Indian road signs before driving through the chaotic streets to the Jaipur Market, where they received their next clue.
- At the Jaipur Market, teams had to stack an ox-cart with 75 clay pots and deliver them to the other end of the market in exchange for their next clue. If teams broke more than 15 pots, they would receive a 15-minute penalty before receiving their next clue.
- In this leg's second Roadblock, one team member, regardless of who performed the first Roadblock, had to figure out a path from the top of a stepwell by walking 41 steps down and 10 steps up to reach a guru, who handed them their next clue. If racers did not walk the correct combination of steps, the guru would tell them to go away.
- After the second Roadblock, teams had to check in at the Pit Stop: the Madhavendra Palace.

Additional notes

- This leg featured a Detour at the Red Elephant Temple that was a choice between either firewalking over hot coals or lying on a bed of nails. These tasks went unaired in the episode.
- Episode 3 aired on 13 June in most areas and 14 June in New South Wales, Queensland and the Australian Capital Territory.

=== Leg 4 (India → United Arab Emirates) ===
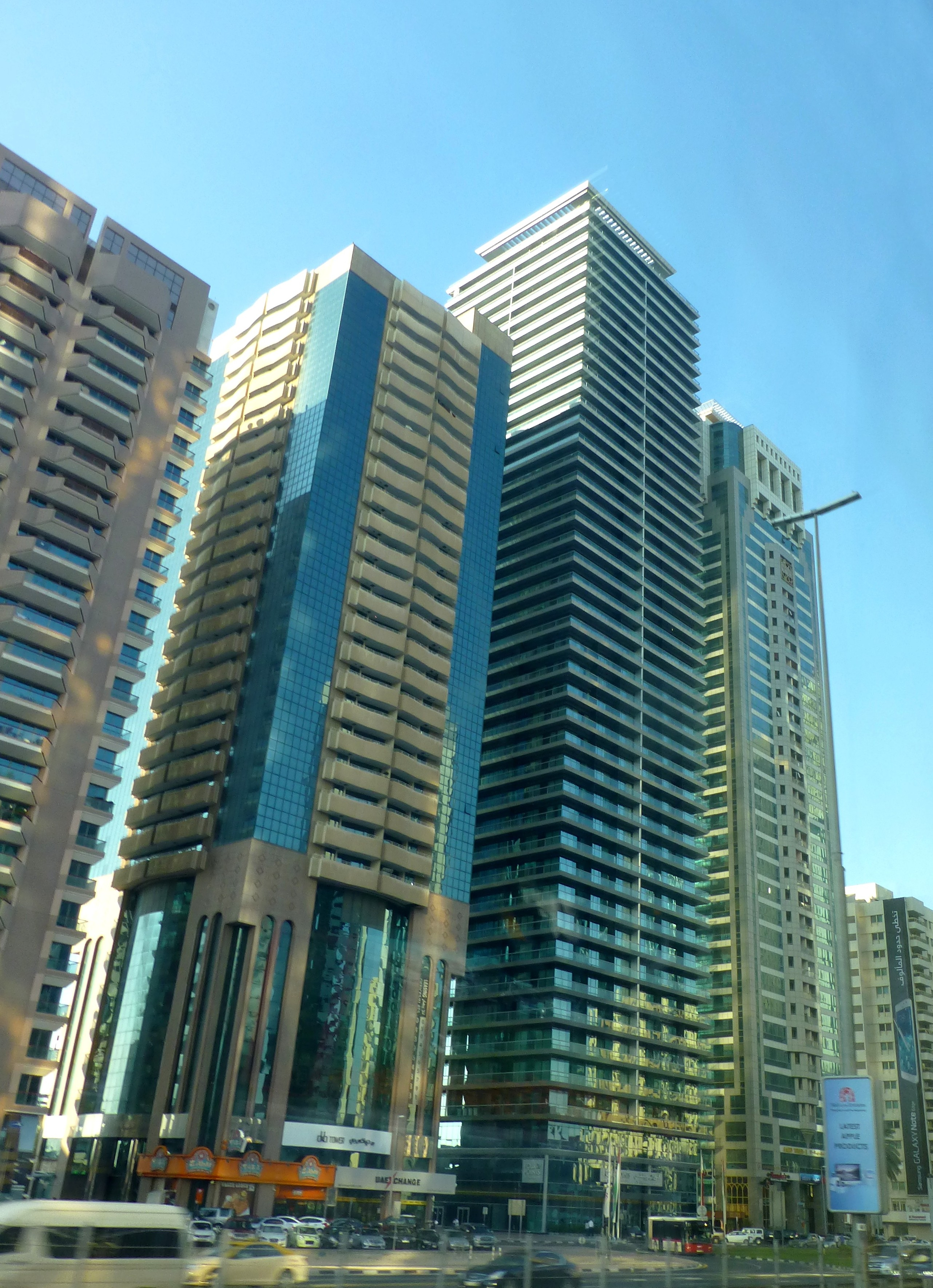
Teams ended this leg in Dubai atop the Four Points Hotel.

- Episode 4: "No More Showing Off" (20 June 2012)
- Prize: A trip for two to Queenstown, New Zealand (awarded to James & Sarah)
- Eliminated: Kym & Donna

Locations

- Jaipur (Nahargarh Fort – Madhavendra Palace)
- Jaipur → Delhi
- Delhi → Dubai, United Arab Emirates (Dubai International Airport)
- Al Faqa (Al Faqa Desert)
- Dubai (Wild Wadi Water Park)
- Dubai (Unknown Building) (Unaired)
- Dubai (Meydan Racecourse)
- Dubai (Four Points by Sheraton)

Episode summary

- At the start of this leg, teams had to vote for the team that they wanted to be U-Turned on this leg in a secret ballot. The team's votes, as well as the voting order, are as follows:

Team	Vote
Shane & Andrew	Paul & Steve
Paul & Steve	Sticky & Sam
Michelle & Jo	Paul & Steve
Joseph & Grace	Paul & Steve
Lucy & Emilia	Shane & Andrew
James & Sarah	Lucy & Emilia
Sticky & Sam	Paul & Steve
Ross & Tarryn	Paul & Steve
Kym & Donna	Paul & Steve

- Teams were instructed to travel by train back to Delhi and then fly to Dubai, United Arab Emirates. Once there, teams had to search the airport parking lot for a marked car, which contained their next clue.
- This leg's Detour was a choice between Camel Dash or Dune Bash. In Camel Dash, teams had to ride a camel through a course and retrieve four coloured flags before receiving their next clue. In Dune Bash, teams had to drive a dune buggy 10 kilometres (6.2 miles) around a flagged desert track before receiving their next clue.
- After the Detour, teams had to drive to Wild Wadi Water Park, where they had to surf to the bottom of the FlowRider using boogie boards and grab their next clue.
- At the Meydan Racecourse, teams had to pick a winning horse in a horse race before receiving their next clue. If teams did not bet on a winning horse in any of the races, or arrived at the racecourse after the races had ended, one team member had to carry their teammate 200 metres (660 ft) across the finish line. This was done by Shane & Andrew, Ross & Tarryn, Paul & Steve and Lucy & Emilia. Teams then had to check in at the Pit Stop: the helipad of the Four Points by Sheraton Hotel

Additional notes

- There was a Roadblock after the task at the water park, which required one team member to abseil down a building before receiving their next clue. This task went unaired in the episode.
- Lucy & Emilia were detained after accidentally driving onto the grounds of a royal palace in Dubai. They were escorted to the police station, but were released several hours later after production intervened on their behalf.
- Kym & Donna fell far behind and could not find their way to the Roadblock. Hours after all the teams had already checked into the Pit Stop, Grant came out to their car, where they had chosen to spend the night, to inform them of their elimination.

=== Leg 5 (United Arab Emirates → Turkey) ===
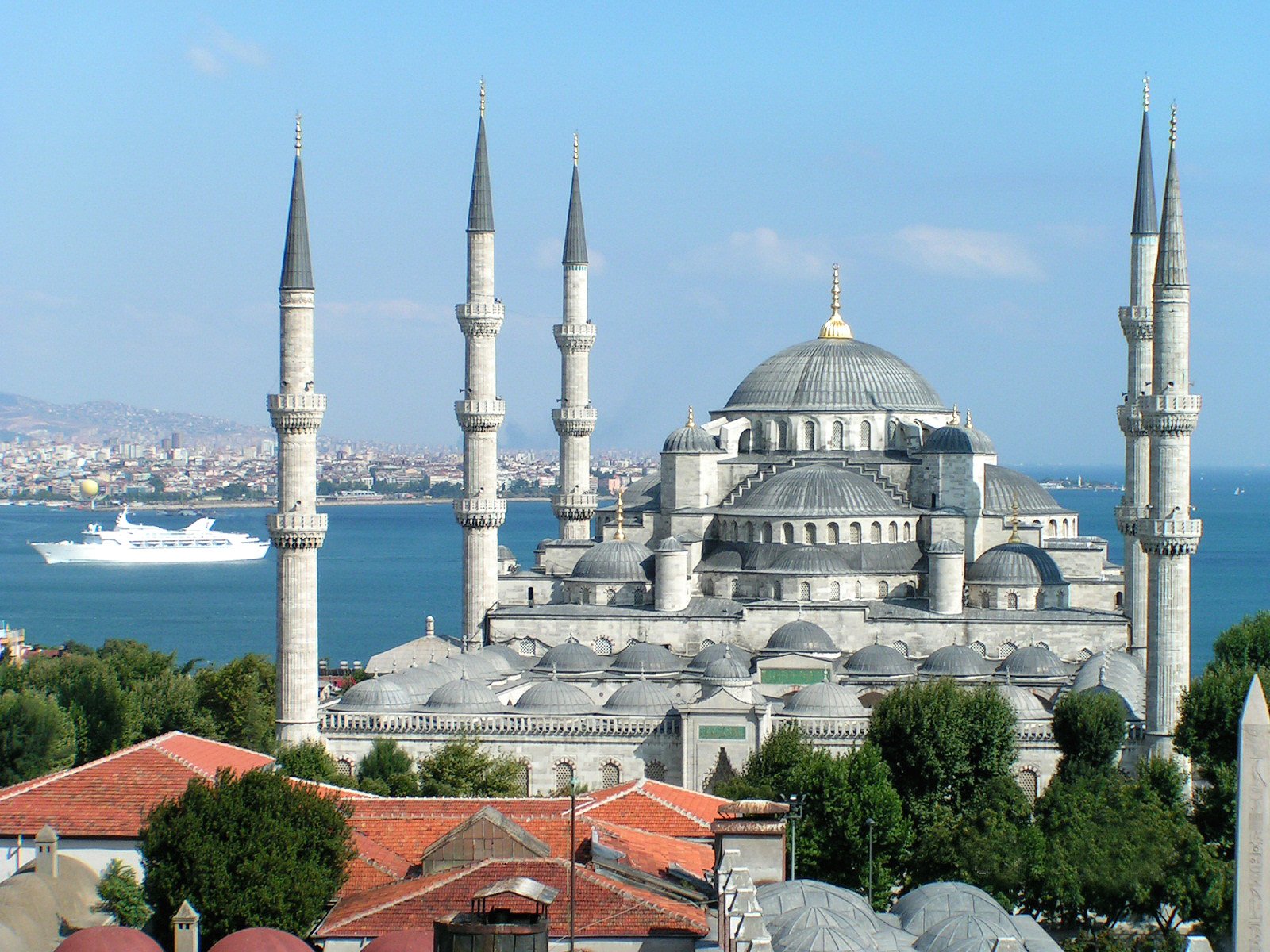
After arriving in Istanbul, teams visited the Blue Mosque.

- Episode 5: "I Know What a Lime is Daddy!" (25 June 2012)
- Prize: A trip for two to the Australian Rally Championship (awarded to Paul & Steve)

Locations

- Dubai (Four Points by Sheraton)
- Dubai (Jumeirah Beach Hotel Marina – Dubai Pearl)
- Dubai (Al-Arsa Souq or Gold Souq)
- Dubai (Deira Old Souq Station)
- Dubai → Istanbul, Turkey
- Istanbul (Blue Mosque)
- Istanbul (Hagia Sophia & Basilica Cistern)
- Istanbul (Archaeological Museum)

Episode summary

- At the start of this leg, teams had to travel to the Jumeirah Beach Hotel marina, wait for the Dubai Pearl dhow and search the ship for the skipper, who had their next clue.
- This leg's Detour was a choice between Count 'Em Up or Price 'Em Up. In Count 'Em Up, teams had to travel to the Al-Arsa Souq and correctly count the number of dried limes in a sack before receiving their next clue. In Price 'Em Up, teams had to find a jewellery store in the Gold Souq, where they had to arrange seven pieces of jewellery from the least expensive to the most expensive before receiving their next clue.
- After the Detour, teams had to travel on foot to the Deira Old Souq station, where they found their next clue. Teams were instructed to fly to Istanbul, Turkey. Once there, teams had to travel to the Blue Mosque and search the grounds for a sultan, who had their next clue.
- In this leg's Roadblock, one team member had to memorise eight Arabic symbols within the main dome of the Hagia Sophia and then line them up on a vertical column at the Basilica Cistern. Racers could only go back to the Hagia Sophia once if they were unable to recall the symbols. Once the symbols were ordered correctly, racers could retrieve their next clue from a pool of leeches that directed them to the Pit Stop: the Archaeological Museum.

Additional notes

- Shane & Andrew chose to use the Anonymous U-Turn on Paul & Steve.
- This was a non-elimination leg.

=== Leg 6 (Turkey) ===
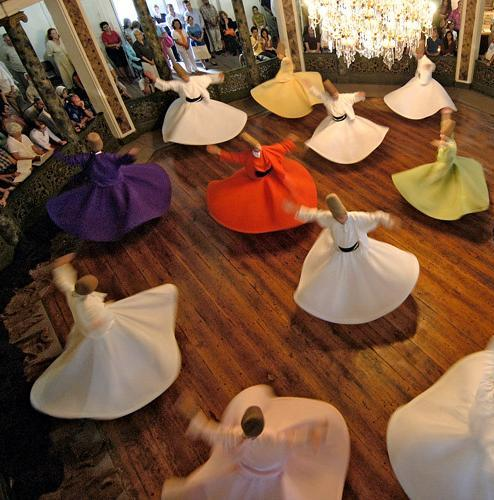
This leg's Roadblock had racers participate in the Turkish tradition of Sufi whirling.

- Episode 6: "Take a Seat... My Stunning Specimen of a Man!" (2 July 2012)
- Prize: A state of the art computer package (awarded to Paul & Steve)
- Eliminated: Ross & Tarryn

Locations

- Istanbul (Archaeological Museum)
- Istanbul (Ayasofya Hürrem Sultan Hamamı)
- Istanbul (Yeni Camii or Egyptian Bazaar)
- Istanbul (Rumelihisarı)
- Istanbul (Darüzziyafe Restaurant)
- Istanbul (Beyazıt Square)

Episode summary

- At the start of this leg, teams had to travel to the Ayasofya Hürrem Sultan Hamamı, where team members had to scrub each other using a provided bar of soap until the word DETOUR was revealed on the soap before receiving their next clue.
- This leg's Detour was a choice between Shine or Design. In Shine, teams had to choose one of four marked shoe shine stalls outside Yeni Camii and convince ten locals to have their shoes shined for no less than four liras each before receiving their next clue. In Design, teams had to find a carpet store in the Egyptian Bazaar, choose a photograph depicting a section of Turkish carpet and find a perfect match among the hundreds of carpets before receiving their next clue.
- After the Detour, teams had to find their next clue at Rumelihisarı.
- At Rumelihisarı, teams encountered an Intersection, which required two teams to mutually join together to complete the following task. The teams were paired up thusly: Paul & Steve and Michelle & Jo, Joseph & Grace and Sticky & Sam, Lucy & Emilia and Shane & Andrew, and James & Sarah and Ross & Tarryn. The joined teams had to choose one of their four members to break through a line of four Turkish oil wrestlers and grab an oil lamp from a table before receiving their next clue. After this task, teams were no longer joined.
- In this leg's Roadblock, one team member had to continuously spin with whirling dervishes for five minutes before receiving their next clue, which directed them to the Pit Stop: Beyazıt Square.

Additional note

- Paul & Steve chose to Yield Michelle & Jo.

=== Leg 7 (Turkey → France → Cuba) ===
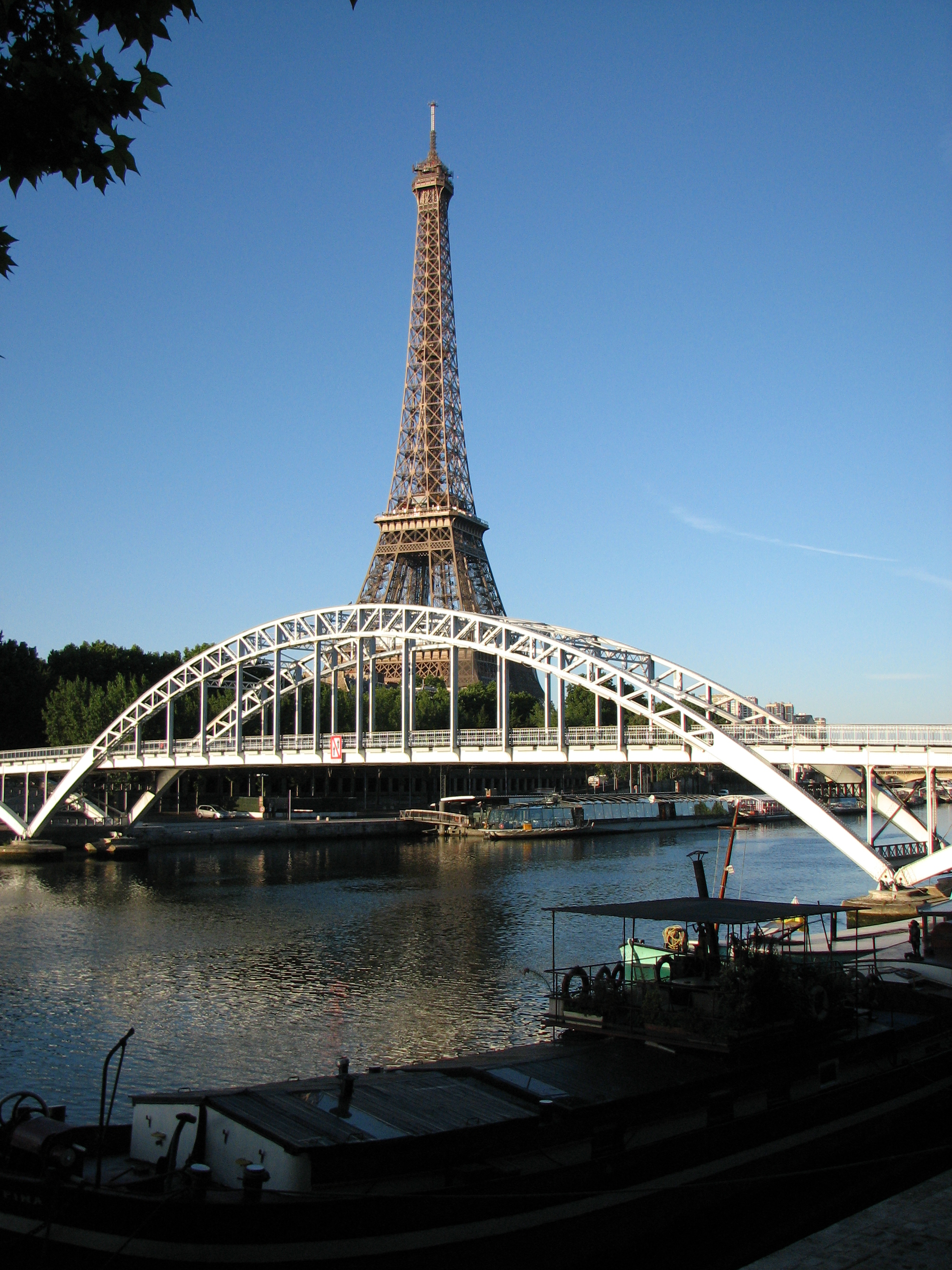
While in Paris, teams visited the Passerelle Debilly overlooking the Eiffel Tower.

- Episode 7: "How Do You Fold Liquid?" (9 July 2012)

Locations

- Istanbul (Beyazıt Square)
- Istanbul → Paris, France
- Paris (Le Cordon Bleu)
- Rungis (Rungis Wholesale Market)
- Paris (Alléosse Cheese Shop)
- Paris (Passerelle Debilly)
- Paris → Havana, Cuba (José Martí International Airport)
- Havana (Cigar Factory or Park) (Unaired)
- Havana (Tropicana Nightclub)
- Havana (Hotel Nacional)

Episode summary

- At the start of this leg, teams were instructed to fly to Paris, France. Once there, teams had to travel to Le Cordon Bleu and find their next clue.
- In this leg's Roadblock, one team member had to sign up for a cooking class, the first of which could only accommodate four team members and the second of which started an hour later. Racers had to bake a batch of Grand Marnier soufflés to the satisfaction of the directeur before receiving their next clue.
- After the Roadblock, teams had to search among of 230 hectares (570 acres) of stalls at the Rungis Wholesale Market for Jean-Marie's cheese cellar, collect a 30-kilogram (66 lb) wheel of cheese and then deliver it 25 kilometres (16 mi) undamaged to the Alléosse Cheese Shop before receiving their next clue. Teams were directed to the Passerelle Debilly, where they had to find a painter with their next clue. Teams were then instructed to fly to Havana, Cuba. Once there, teams had to search the airport parking lot for a marked classic car which contained their next clue.
- Teams had to drive to the Tropicana Nightclub and find the lead showgirl, who handed them their next clue, which directed them to the Pit Stop: the Hotel Nacional.

Additional note

- After arriving in Havana, teams encountered a Detour that went unaired. Teams had to choose between rolling Cuban cigars or learning a dance. Sticky & Sam used their Express Pass, the receipt of which in leg 2 had also been unmentioned in the episode as aired, to bypass this Detour.
- There was no elimination at the end of this leg; all teams were instead instructed to continue racing.

=== Leg 8 (Cuba) ===
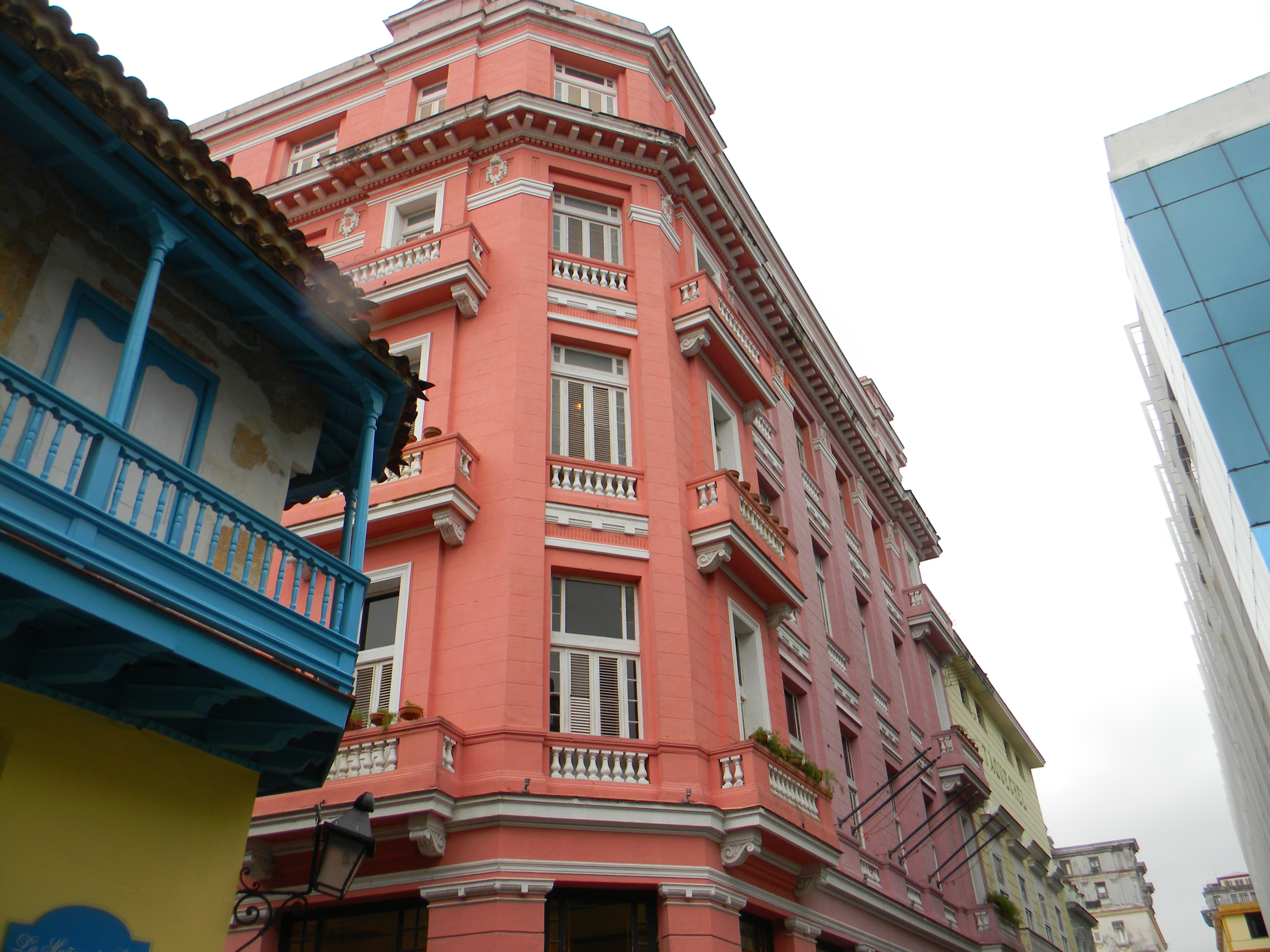
One of the Detour choices in Havana required teams to deliver daiquiris to the Hotel Ambos Mundos.

- Episode 8: "It's a Pit Pause" (16 July 2012)
- Prize: A trip for two to Queenstown, New Zealand (awarded to Paul & Steve)
- Eliminated: Sticky & Sam

Locations

- Havana (Marina Hemingway)
- Havana (Plaza de la Catedral or El Floridita Bar & Hotel Ambos Mundos)
- Ciénaga de Zapata (Crocodile Farm)
- Ciénaga de Zapata (Laguna del Tesoro – Hotel Villa Guamá)

Episode summary

- At the Marina Hemingway, teams had to sign up for one of four charter boats the next morning departing 30 minutes apart. They received their next clue after boarding the boat.
- In this leg's Roadblock, one team member had to either use a compass and a nautical chart with two coordinates to locate a fishing boat with "the old fisherman of the sea" on board, who had their next clue, or catch a fish if they couldn't find the fisherman.
- This leg's Detour was a choice between Che Puzzle or Daiquiri Guzzle. In Che Puzzle, teams had to complete a 90-piece puzzle of Che Guevara at the Plaza de la Catedral before receiving their next clue. In Daiquiri Guzzle, both team members had to make six daiquiris at El Floridita Bar and then carry them on a tray with one hand to Ernest Hemingway's old room at the Hotel Ambos Mundos. If none of the daiquiris spilled or were dropped along the way, teams received their next clue; otherwise, they had to go back to the bar and make the daiquiris again.
- After the Detour, teams had to drive to a crocodile farm in Ciénaga de Zapata, where they had to feed Cuban crocodiles and then catch a crocodile before receiving their next clue. Teams were then instructed to travel across the Laguna del Tesoro the Pit Stop at the Hotel Villa Guamá.

Additional note

- There was a U-Turn vote after the Detour then went unaired. Sticky & Sam were on the receiving end of the U-Turn.

=== Leg 9 (Cuba → Canada) ===
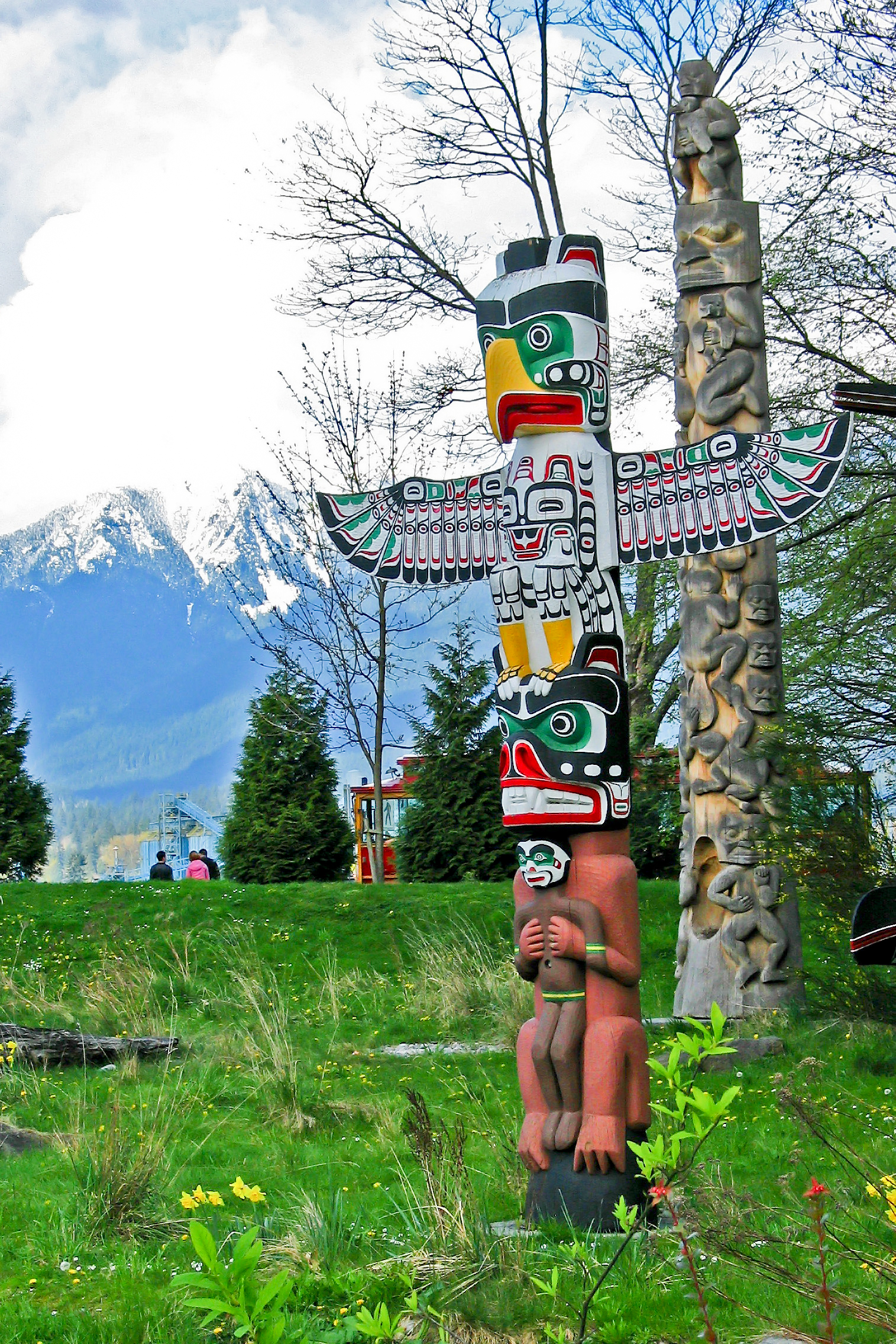
After arriving in Vancouver, teams went to Stanley Park to watch a First Nations ritual near the park's totem poles.

- Episode 9: "Why Am I Trying to Ride a Log on Icy Water?" (23 July 2012)
- Prize: A$10,000 (awarded to Paul & Steve)
- Eliminated: James & Sarah

Locations

- Havana (El Capitolio)
- Havana → Vancouver, Canada
- Vancouver (Stanley Park)
- Vancouver (Vancouver Rowing Club → Harbour Green Park Dock)
- Vancouver (Nicole Sleeth Studio)
- North Vancouver (The Learning Lodge)
- North Vancouver (Grouse Mountain Skyride)
- Vancouver (CRAB Park at Portside)

Episode summary

- At the start of this leg, teams were instructed to fly to Vancouver, Canada. Once there, teams had to travel to Stanley Park, where they had to find the totem poles and watch a traditional Squamish First Nations dance before receiving a blessing by the chief along with their next clue. Teams were instructed to collect two paddles and take them to the Vancouver Rowing Club.
- In this season's only Fast Forward, one team had to travel to an art studio, where they had to strip nude and model for six artists. Once the students completed their sketches, the art teacher gave the team the Fast Forward award. Paul & Steve won the Fast Forward.
- Teams who did not pursue the Fast Forward had to choose a kayak and paddle to the Harbour Green Park dock. There, they had to decipher a series of maritime flags so as to spell out a nautical phrase – "Three sheets to the wind, splice to the mainbrace, weigh anchor and set sail." – before receiving their next clue.
- This leg's Detour was a choice between Toss or Tumble. Both Detour options required that teams travel to The Learning Lodge near Rice Lake and don lumberjack clothing. In Toss, teams had to throw an axe at a target from six metres (20 ft) away and score 10 shots out of 40 before receiving their next clue. In Tumble, teams had to roll a log so that it rotated 10 times in a pool of water before receiving their next clue. If a team member fell off the log, they had to swap with their partner to continue.
- In this leg's Roadblock, one team member had to stand on top of a cable car riding up toward the top of Grouse Mountain and grab three flags as they passed before receiving their next clue directing them to the Pit Stop: CRAB Park at Portside.

=== Leg 10 (Canada) ===
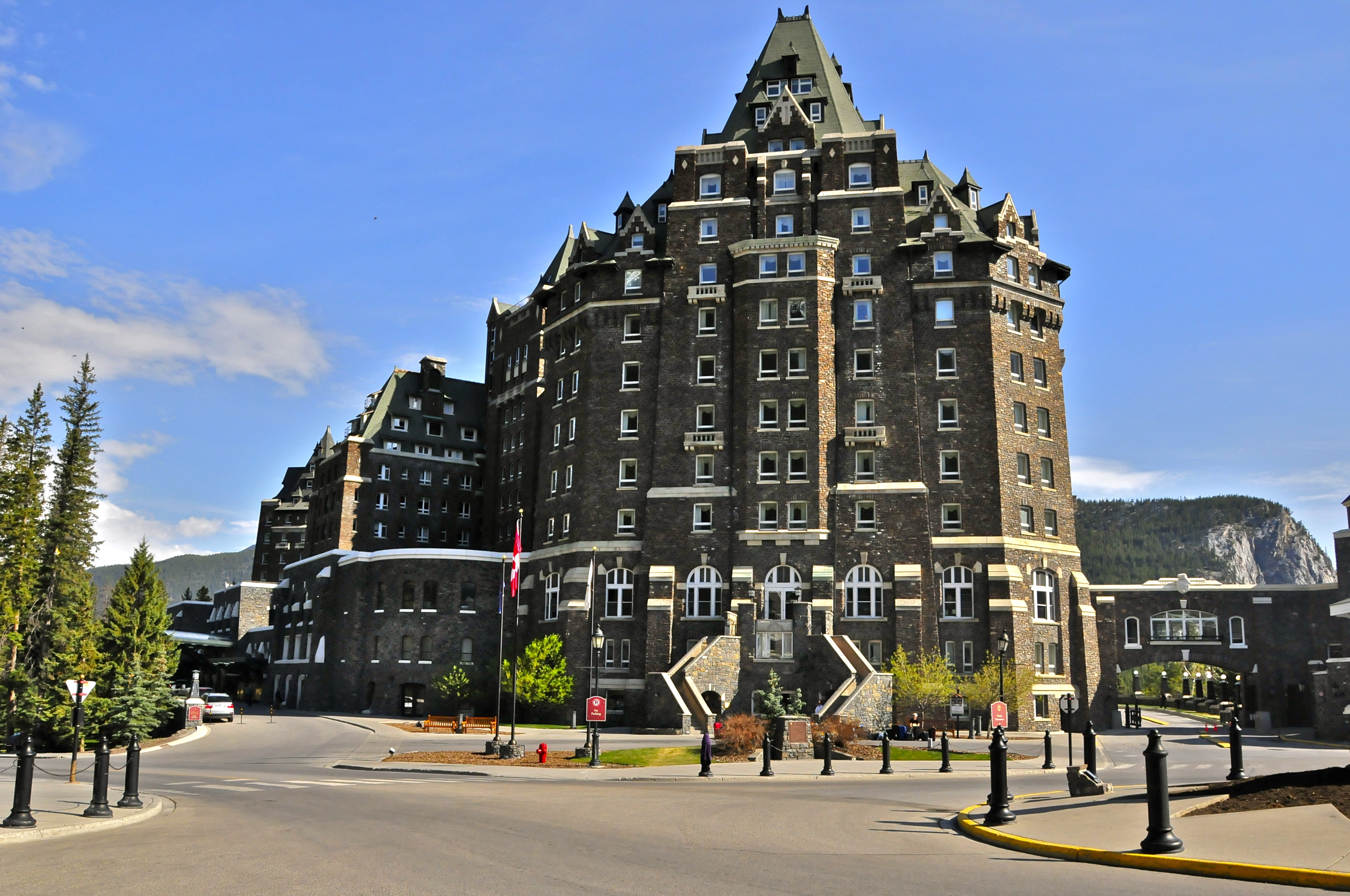
Teams ended this leg in Alberta at the Banff Springs Hotel inside Banff National Park.

- Episode 10: "I Do My Riding Better in the Bedroom" (13 August 2012)
- Prize: A$10,000 (awarded to Shane & Andrew)
- Eliminated: Lucy & Emilia

Locations

- Vancouver (Coal Harbour Marina)
- Vancouver (The Westin Bayshore) → Banff (Banff National Park Administration Building)
- Banff (Wild Bill's Saloon)
- Canmore (Rundle Mountain)
- Lake Louise (Lake Louise Ski Resort)
- Banff National Park (Great Divide Trail)
- Lake Louise (Chateau Lake Louise)
- Banff (Banff Springs Hotel)

Episode summary

- At the start of this leg, teams had to travel to The Westin Bayshore hotel, where they had to sign up for one of two buses, the first of which carried only two teams and departed an hour before the second, to their next destination: Banff, Alberta. Once there, teams had to travel to Wild Bill's Saloon, where they had to ride a mechanical bull for a combined total of at least sixty seconds before receiving their next clue, which directed them to Rundle Mountain in Canmore. Shane & Andrew won a 30-minute head start on the Roadblock for lasting on the bull the longest.
- In this leg's Roadblock, one team member had to ice climb 25 metres (82 ft) to the top of a frozen waterfall using ice axes and crampons and retrieve their next clue.
- After the Roadblock, teams had to drive themselves to the Lake Louise Ski Resort in Lake Louise and pick up ski equipment before taking the ski lift up the mountain.
- This leg's Detour was a choice between Search or Ski. In Search, teams had to use an avalanche rescue beacon to search a 4,000-square-metre (43,000 sq ft) area for a transmitter buried beneath the snow that they could exchange for their next clue. In Ski, both team members had to complete a slalom skiing course by weaving past all of the flags before receiving their next clue.
- After the Detour, teams had to travel through the Great Divide Trail in Banff National Park, where they had to lead a team of sled dogs around a three-kilometre (1.9 mi) course to find their next clue, which directed them to Chateau Lake Louise. There, teams had to use an assortment of provided items to extract their clue from an ice sculpture that directed them to the Pit Stop: the Banff Springs Hotel.

Additional note

- After completing the slalom segment of the Ski option of the Detour, teams had to place photos of the teams who finished last in the previous nine legs of the race in chronological order before receiving their next clue. This segment of the Detour went unaired.

=== Leg 11 (Canada → China) ===
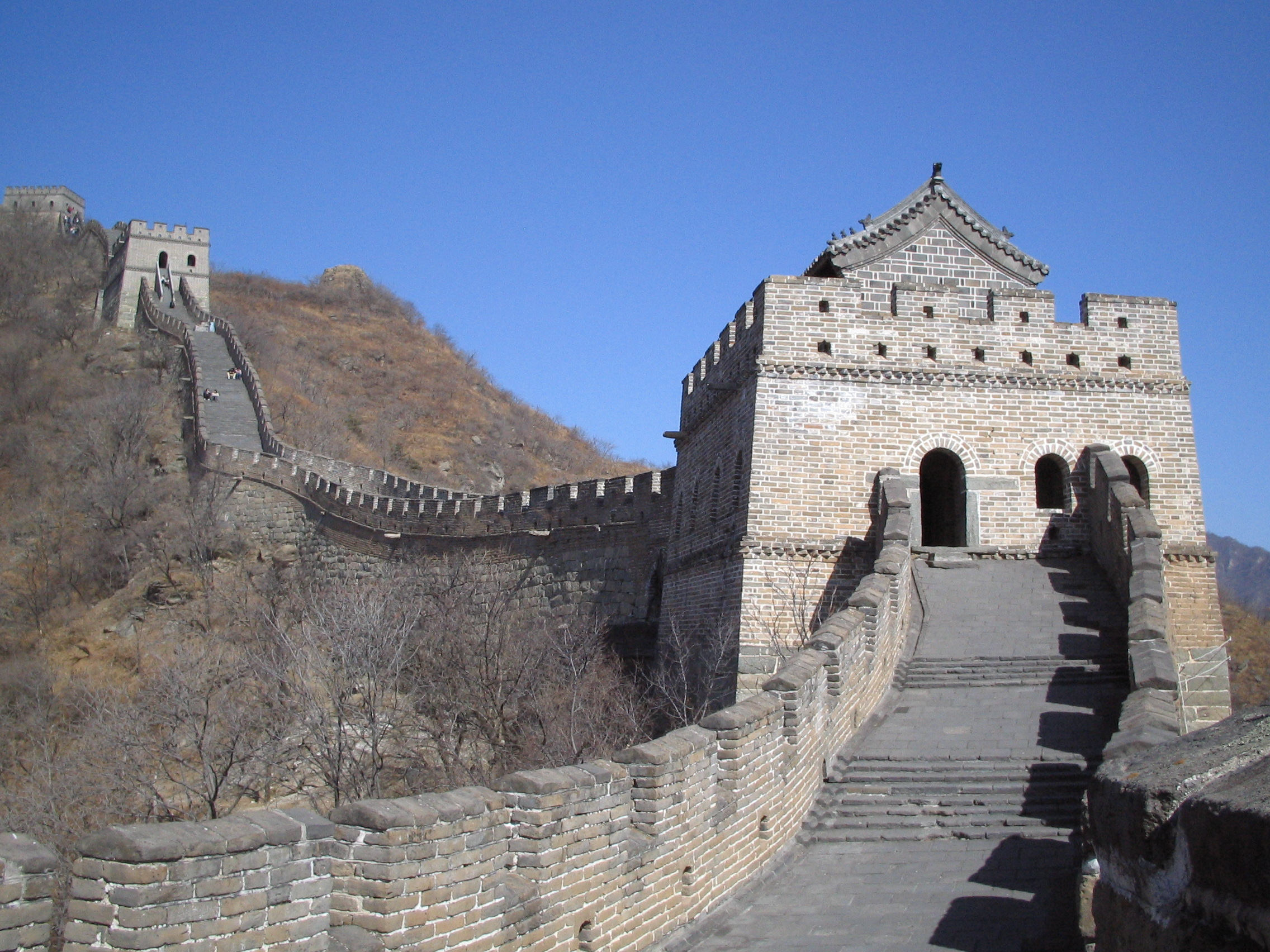
Teams visited the Mutianyu section of the Great Wall of China for the Roadblock.

- Episode 11: "You Have a Smiley Face on Front" (14 August 2012)
- Prize: A$10,000 (awarded to Michelle & Jo)
- Eliminated: Joseph & Grace

Locations

- Banff (Banff Springs Hotel)
- Banff → Calgary
- Calgary → Beijing, China
- Beijing (Ghost Street)
- Beijing (Liang An Yi Jia)
- Beijing (Wuzhisheng Foot Reflection Health Center)
- Beijing (Marco Polo Bridge)
- Beijing (Great Wall of China – Mutianyu)
- Beijing (Forbidden City – Tàimiào Temple)

Episode summary

- At the start of this leg, teams were instructed to travel by bus to Calgary and then fly to Beijing, China. Once there, teams had to find a marked stall on Ghost Street with their next clue.
- This leg's Detour was a choice between Waiter or Wheel. In Waiter, teams had to take food orders from eight customers in Mandarin Chinese and recite each order to the chef. If they pronounced the orders correctly, the chef gave them the meals to serve to the customers. Once every customer received their correct meal, teams received their next clue. In Wheel, team members had to spin a lazy Susan with the names of Chinese delicacies on it and their partner had to eat whatever it landed on. After each team member ate two dishes, they received their next clue.
- At the Wuzhisheng Foot Reflection Health Center, both team members had to endure a ten-minute reflexology foot massage before receiving their next clue. In the event that racers could not bear the painful part of the massage, they could pull their foot away to signal the masseuse to stop; however, they would have to restart the massage from the beginning. Teams then had to travel to the Marco Polo Bridge and count the number of the bridge's lion head statues before receiving their next clue.
- In this leg's Roadblock, one team member had to pass through nine rows of warriors and retrieve their next clue. In each row, only one warrior would let them through and the others would block them. If the team member were blocked by a warrior three times, they had to go back to the first row and start again.
- After the Roadblock, teams had to check in at the Pit Stop: Tàimiào Temple at the Forbidden City.

Additional note

- Joseph & Grace failed to make it to the required area of the Great Wall of China for the Roadblock after travelling to the Inner Mongolian section of the Great Wall instead. After all of the other teams had checked in, Grant came out to their location to inform them of their elimination.

=== Leg 12 (China → Australia) ===
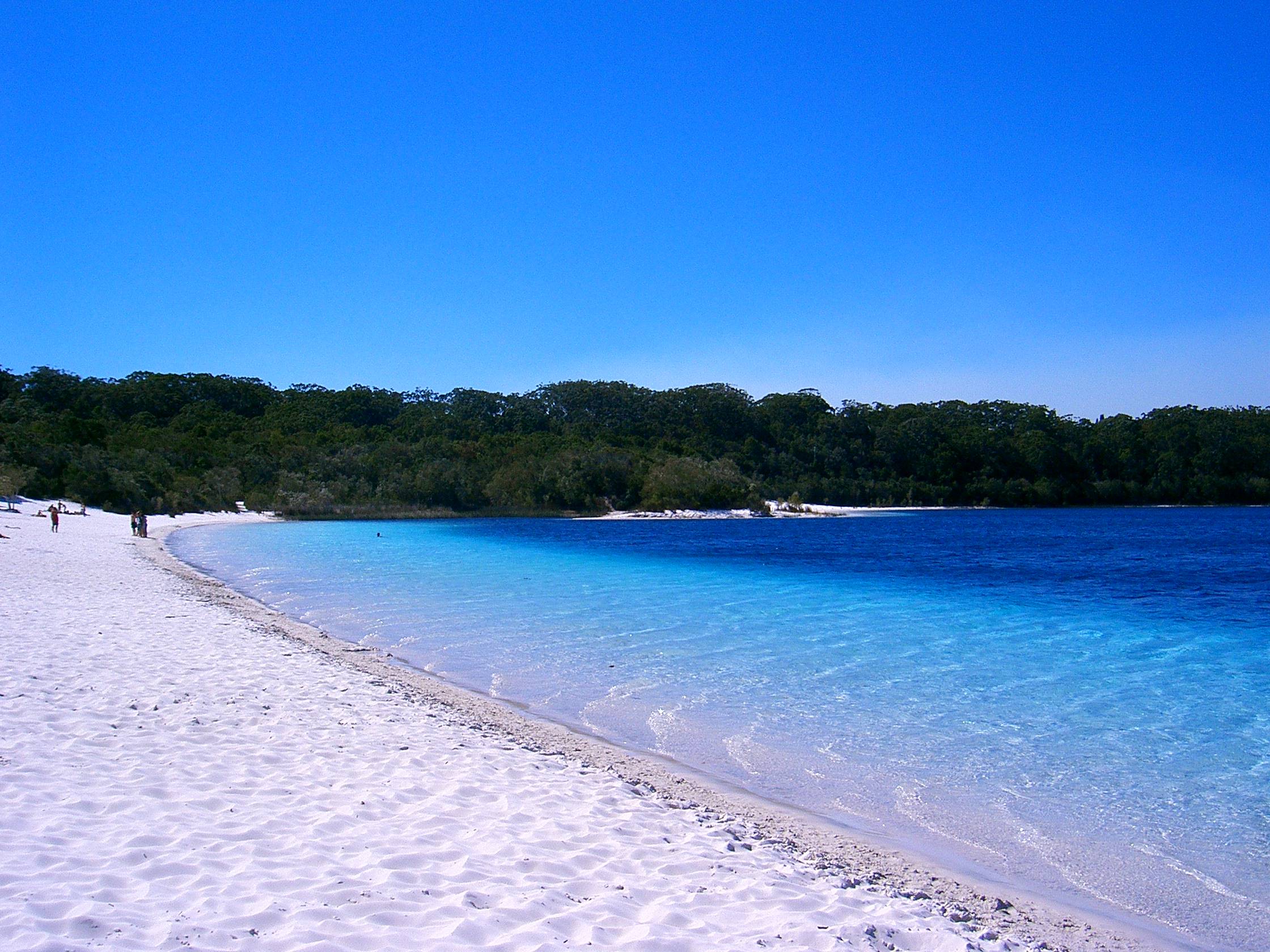
Lake McKenzie on Fraser Island was the location of the final Roadblock and the finish line.

- Episode 12: "I'm Sorry My Looks, My Facial Expressions Annoy You!" (15 August 2012)
- Prize: A$250,000
- Winners: Shane & Andrew
- Runners-up: Paul & Steve
- Third place: Michelle & Jo

Locations

- Beijing → Guilin
- Guilin (Guihu Lake (in Chinese))
- Guilin (Lijiang River)
- Yangshuo County (Kindergarten School)
- Baisha (Baisha Market)
- Guilin → Brisbane, Queensland (Brisbane Airport)
- Brisbane (Captain Burke Park)
- Brisbane (Boggo Road Gaol)
- Brisbane → Fraser Island (75 Mile Beach)
- Fraser Island (Lake McKenzie)

Episode summary

- During the Pit Stop, all teams were flown from Beijing to Guilin and began the final leg at Guihu Lake. At the start of the leg, teams had to don traditional fishermen outfits before paddling onto the Lijiang River, where they had to ask fishermen "Do you have something for me?" in Mandarin Chinese until they received their next clue. If they asked a wrong fisherman, they were given a fish instead.
- This season's final Detour required teams to travel to a kindergarten school in Yangshuo County to complete either Teach or Learn. In Teach, teams had to teach one kindergartner ten Australian slang words. Once their student correctly recited all ten words to the teacher, teams received their next clue. In Learn, teams were taught how to say the same ten Australian slang words in Mandarin Chinese by one of the kindergartners. If teams could recite all ten words correctly to the teacher, they received their next clue.
- After the Detour, teams had to travel to the Baisha Market, where they had to convince ten locals to buy a vegetable slicer for no less than ¥5 each before receiving their next clue. Teams were then instructed to fly to Brisbane. Once there, teams had to search the airport parking lot for a marked vehicle, which contained their next clue and directed them to Captain Burke Park. Teams were then directed to the Boggo Road Gaol, where teams had to find a prison warden with their next clue. One team member then had to answer five questions and their partner had to match the answers before receiving their next clue.

Questions	Answers		
Questions	Michelle & Jo	Paul & Steve	Shane & Andrew
Which team would lend you a helping hand?	Shane & Andrew	Lucy & Emilia	Michelle & Jo
Which team would lie to you?	Joseph & Grace	Michelle & Jo	Paul & Steve
Which team worked best together?	Shane & Andrew	Lucy & Emilia	Shane & Andrew
Whose relationship do you envy?	Ross & Tarryn	Sticky & Sam	Sticky & Sam
Which was the unluckiest team?	Adam & Dane	Adam & Dane	Adam & Dane

- Teams were directed to Archerfield Airport, where they had to board a charter flight to their final destination: Fraser Island. Once on Fraser Island, teams had to drive themselves to Lake McKenzie to find their next clue.
- In this season's final Roadblock, one team member had to wade out to clue boxes in the lake which each contained a multiple choice question based on previous legs. Then they had to place coloured rings around the clue boxes which corresponded to the correct answer. If they got the questions right, they received the final clue.

Questions	Answers	
The famous nightclub you visited upon arrival in Havana is called:	C	Tropicana
The famous cooking school you attended in Paris was:	B	Le Cordon Bleu
In Istanbul, you scrubbed each other down. What is the correct term for a Turkish bath?	A	Hammam
Which of the following is not a mode of transport you travelled on during the Race?	A	Canoe
The Pit Stop in Jaipur was located on the rooftop of which fort?	C	Nahargarh Fort

- After the Roadblock, teams had to dig up a treasure chest containing A$250,000 and carry it across the nearby finish line.

== Ratings ==
#	Airdate	Viewers					Total viewers (Day rank)	Ref
#	Airdate	Sydney	Melbourne	Brisbane	Adelaide	Perth	Total viewers (Day rank)	Ref
1	30 May 2012	289,000	310,000	107,000	90,000	89,000	886,000 (10)	
2	6 June 2012	268,000	285,000	133,000	107,000	90,000	883,000 (11)	
3	13 & 14 June 2012	—N/a	—N/a	—N/a	—N/a	—N/a	715,000 (N/A)	
4	20 June 2012	190,000	215,000	103,000	84,000	103,000	695,000 (15)	
5	25 June 2012	245,000	318,000	142,000	125,000	142,000	971,000 (11)	
6	2 July 2012	310,000	356,000	155,000	116,000	164,000	1,101,000 (7)	
7	9 July 2012	317,000	308,000	159,000	117,000	122,000	1,023,000 (9)	
8	16 July 2012	252,000	302,000	138,000	106,000	115,000	913,000 (10)	
9	23 July 2012	306,000	328,000	140,000	114,000	126,000	1,014,000 (7)	
10	13 August 2012	212,000	218,000	130,000	109,000	119,000	787,000 (15)	
11	14 August 2012	267,000	252,000	149,000	107,000	121,000	896,000 (12)	
12	15 August 2012	296,000	277,000	171,000	117,000	115,000	976,000 (8)	

- Episode 3, aired on 13 June in most areas and 14 June in New South Wales, Queensland and Australian Capital Territory and because of that, it is unknown how many people watched the show in each area as this episode was not in the top 20 on either night.
- No episodes aired between 30 July and 6 August, to avoid clashing with the 2012 Summer Olympics.
