= Dubai Textile Souk =

Textile Souq of Dubai

Coordinates: 25.2647482°N 55.2950430°E

The Dubai Textile Souk (Arabic: سوق الغزل والنسيج; also known as the Old Textile Souk) is a traditional souq (market) of textile products in Dubai's historic Bur Dubai neighbourhood, along the Dubai Creek. It is located in the United Arab Emirates. Opposite to the textile souk on the other side of the Dubai Creek lie the Dubai Spice Souk and Dubai Gold Souk in Deira, accessible via the creek by special abra boats. It is open 10am to 10 pm Saturday to Thursday with some vendors taking a lunch break from 1-4pm and Friday is 4 pm to 10pm only. The souks of Dubai have a rich history of trade within the Persian Gulf region and have developed over time as Dubai urbanised rapidly.

Traditionally, the Dubai Textile Souk was a commercial hub of the exchange in textiles, for functional use of making clothes or for special occasions. Over the years and through Dubai's rapid globalisation, its commercial importance has since faded and has become a more tourist-focused.

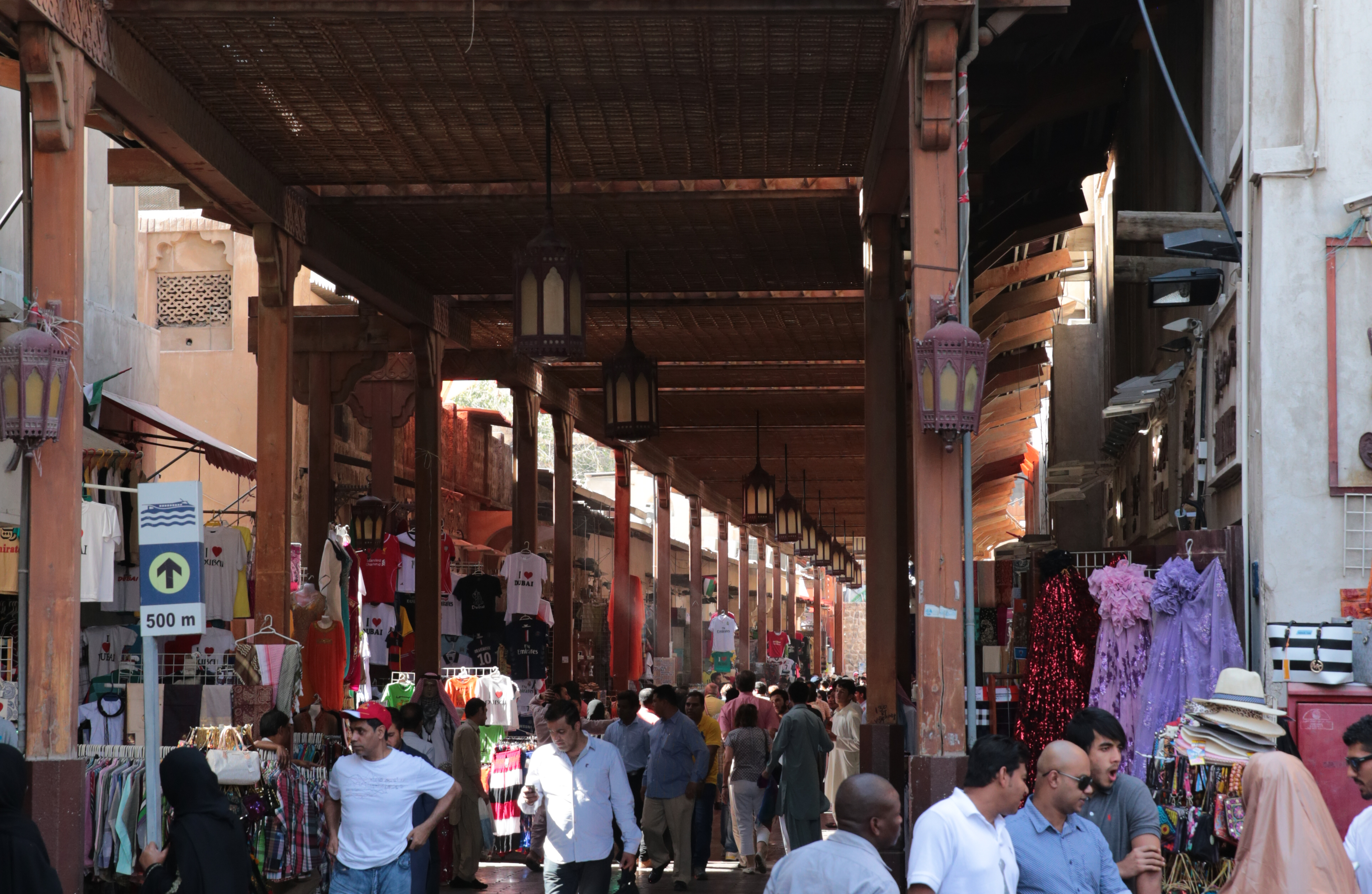
One of the traditional sikkas in the Dubai Textile Souk

== History ==
=== Trade in Dubai leading to development of Textile Souk ===
Dubai played a major role in trade of the Persian Gulf as a part of the Ottoman Empire, settling since at least 1799. At the time the 7 emirate shaykhdoms had their on monarchies, Dubai being one of these emirates. Around the 1820s, with the protection of the British Navy, as they assisted in disrupting constant raids to the Dubai Creek, the sleepy fishing villages of Dubai began to concentrate on making money through trade. The commerce of Dubai revolved around the Dubai Creek as unlike other creeks along the north coast region it was long, ultimately paving way for cargo ships coming from the Persian Gulf.

The Maktoum families rule began in the nation in 1833, and they situated themselves in Shindagah, which had easy access to Dubai's source of wealth, which at the time was pearls and fishing within the creek and the Persian Gulf. As the pearling industry thrived, the results were exported to India and Europe. Trade with India and Persia in particular, stimulated foreign traders to begin trading in the city port. Dubai soon gained a reputation as a commerce capital but also as a place hospitable towards non-Arabs conducting business. By the mid-19th century, Shindagah held 250 Arab homes, neighbouring suburb, Bur Dubai, which is now the home of the Dubai Textile Souk (or Old Souk), housed 100 Indian traders and across the creek at Deira had 1,600 homes with a mixture of culture, housing Arabs, Persians and Baluchis (now known as Pakistan).

The pearl industry continued to bring wealth to the Creek and increased the population greatly, coupled with the progressive, liberal lead of Maktoum bin Hashar in 1894, who thoroughly encouraged commerce and trading, the Old Souk begun and was constructed during this time. In 1902, Dubai saw a spike in migrating Iranian traders and Arab settlers and the commerce hub boasted the largest souks in Arabia, including the Old Souk.

=== Modern Era: Worldwide recession and discovery of oil ===
As a result, the worldwide recession in the 1930s post World War I, trade within the Dubai Creek came to a halt, and the Dubai Textile Souk struggled. And with World War II looming at the end of the 1930s, trade was further affected during this period. Although Dubai quickly recovered from the second world war as oil is discovered in the Trucial States, sparking a major economic boost for the region where immigration, trade and general business flourished. As a result, the growth in the Indian and Pakistani population of Dubai gave new life to the Dubai Textile Souk.

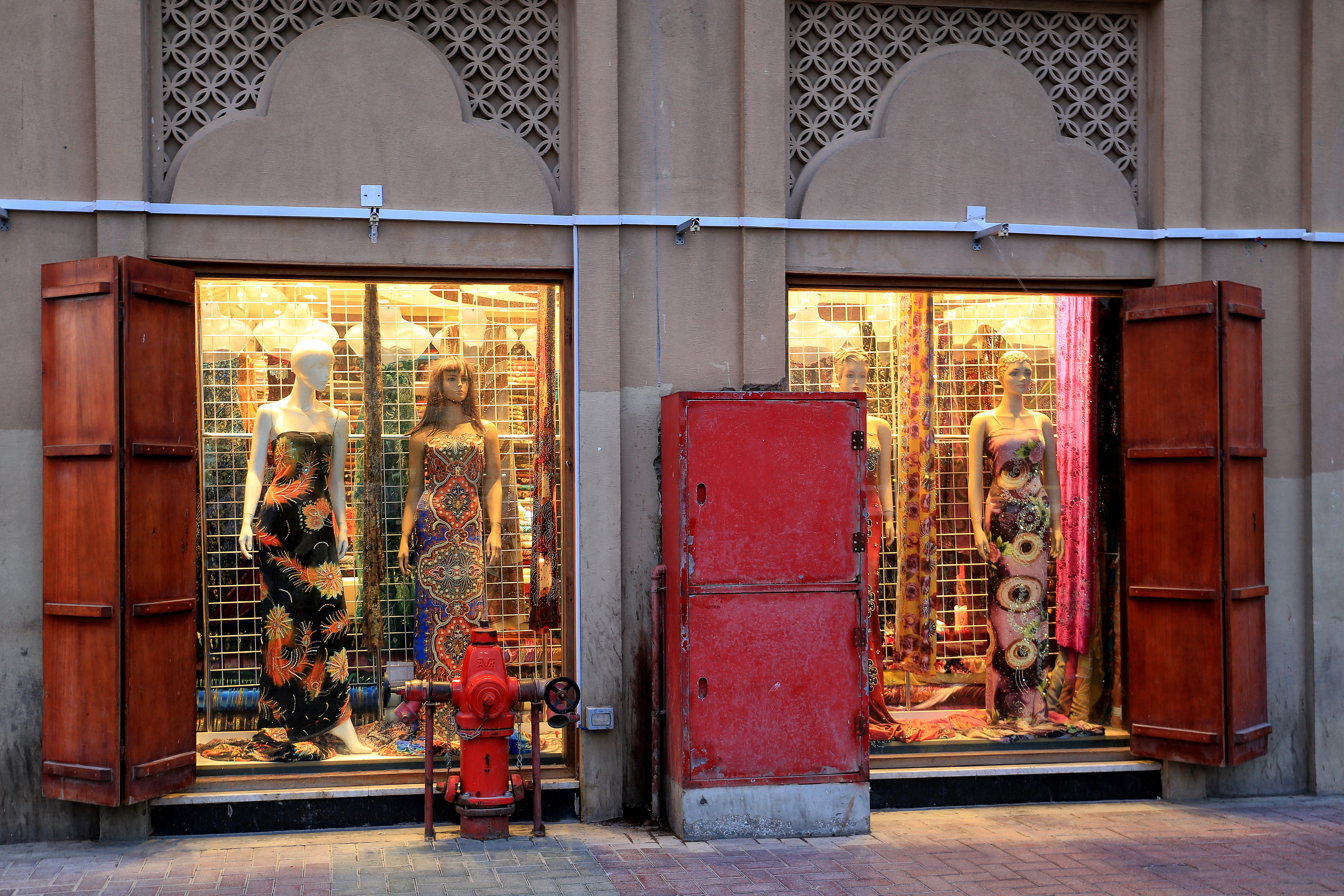
shops on the Textile Souk

The discovery of oil was a game-changer for Dubai, and is what ultimately sparked the rapid globalisation of the city. In 1971 a Dubai International Airport was established and opened. By 1979, Jebel Ali Port and the Dubai Trade Centre, the first high rise buildings were erected, the first of many ambitious, rapid and phenomenal architectural projects. This intense modernisation of Dubai, ultimately is what sparked an increase in tourism within the city. For example, hotels begun to quickly pop up going from 42 hotels in the city in 1985 to 272 in 2002. This rapid change from traditional to modern, coupled with the increase in tourism, the Dubai Textile souk became a key tourist attraction of the ‘old Dubai’. The old Souk's actual trade use was eradicated by the globalisation, hence vendors altered what they were selling to be more popular with tourists whilst also keeping some traditions. Although trade is still prevalent along the Dubai Creek, the souks play less of a role in the process on a large scale level. There are still some wholesale companies behind souk areas, but they do not play large roles in trade.

=== Indian and Pakistani influence ===
The history of the Bur Dubai and Dubai Creek region which is where the Dubai Textile Market is located, has led to a large Indian and Pakistani influence due to the large amount of Indian and Pakistani traders having settled in the region over the history of trade in the Dubai Creek Region. This has formed what is now known as ‘Hindi Lane’ which consists of little Indian shops selling arrays of bindis, bangles, flowers, saris and other religious items. Indian influence has also formed other main sections of the textile souk such as Al Fahidi Street where vendors mainly sell Indian clothes, shoes and jewellery. Similarly, the Pakistani influence is seen in the selling of pashminas traditionally from Pakistan and salwar kameez, the traditional outfit of Pakistan.

== Geography ==
The Dubai Textile Souk's address is 57, Opposite to the Abra. Ali Bin Abi Talib Street in Bur Dubai. It is located along the Dubai Creek opposite the Deira region which is host to the Dubai Gold Souk, Dubai Perfume Souk and the Dubai Spice Souk. The Textile Souk is also a street away from Souk Al Kabeer, also known as Meena Bazaar. People can access the souk from Deira via an Abra (traditional Emirati boat) or can get a metro to either stops named Al Fahidi or Al Ghubaiba stations.

== Architecture of the souk ==
The traditional architecture of the Dubai Textile Souk is relatively well preserved, despite a few modern touch ups. The general architecture of the souk consists of covered alleys lined with small vendors displaying their products. The alleys, which are traditionally known as sikkas are covered by very tall wooden arches that are designed to allow for air ventilation to keep cool in the heat. This is achieved through the gaps between the wooden arches and the walls of the buildings, firstly for hot hair to rise out and wind draft to come in. The arches are in sections with gaps in between each section and have traditional Arabic lamps within each arch section. The arches are held by industrial style large metal pillars, these a modern addition maintain the traditional arches as the former structure had weakened over time.

=== Pre-Modern era of traditional walkable souks ===
The pre-modern architecture of souks was developed prior to the 1960s. Walkability is an essential in the extreme weather of Dubai, narrow alleys (sikkas) of the shopping streets of the Old Souk providing essential day-long shade and increased the likelihood of wind velocity, particularly from the Dubai Creek, helping to lower temperatures. To further reduce temperatures in the souk are the barajeel, which are wind towers perched on top of traditional merchant house, which was effective throughout history as technology and electricity were not around. The barajeel is a criss-cross structure of rods in the top of tower-like structures which direct wind so that air can be recirculated as a form of air conditioning to rooms beneath. During winter, these wind towers were closed with wood planks, both for privacy and weather. Gypsum panels and gypsum powder were used to decorate, for example for floral and geometric ornamentation or patterns throughout the souk. These items were what was locally available at the time.

=== Modern era of souk architecture ===
Post 1960s, immigrant levels increased, oil wealth was found and Dubai was globalising into a major world city. UNESCO World Heritage nomination aimed at ‘preserving and enhancing the traditional Dubai Creek harbour and its surrounding historic souks’. This rapid need for city development shifted architecture throughout Dubai from locally sourced materials to heavy, pre-fabricated materials leading to intense modular construction. Although, whilst Dubai was swiftly advances, the souks were being preserved and construction within them was only for restorative, functional purposes. The traditional souks such as the Dubai Textile Souk, are renowned for the maintenance of traditional architecture with slight modern advances and structures, such as the supporting metal pylons in the Dubai Textile souk. The animated sikkas and shops in fact still bear the names of ancient merchant families who immigrated from places such as Persia and India. The restoring and preserving of traditional architecture in the Dubai Textile Souk has not only maintained the culture of historical Dubai but also has encouraged influxes of tourists, promoting the economy of the souk and Dubai.

== Economy of the souk ==
Dubai's historic centre, Bur Dubai and ultimately the Dubai Textile Souk still holds a relevant share of income in Dubai's commerce atmosphere and the original business merchants, shipmen and culture within such souks and areas have been preserved. This historic centre is a lively urban sector and active economy based on the free trade principles established in the beginning of the 20th century. Now the Dubai Textile Souk provides economic value through the large amounts of tourists that it attracts.

=== Payment methods ===
The main method of payment and preferred payment of vendors is cash, although there are credit card machine options available at some shops. The souk is also surrounded by multiple ATM's allowing for tourists to get cash out if they need to do so. The currency of the souk is the local Dubai currency, Dirham (AED) with denominations of 5, 10, 20, 50, 100, 200, 500 and 1,000. About one US dollar is worth AED 3.67, although this is susceptible to change in different economic environments.

=== Prices and bartering ===
Most vendors offer negotiable prices, and there are often sales, particularly around major holidays such as Eid and Diwali, as most of the vendors are of Indian descent. It is suggested that consumers look around at all stores before buying items as many of the vendors may have different stock at lower prices or similar stock that is of better quality. Bartering is very common in the Dubai Textile Souk, like most souks around the world. It is thought that some vendors take advantage of tourists and charge more for their products, so bargaining is often encouraged. The items sold in the Textile Souk are good value and relatively inexpensive, ranging from 5–50 dirham for basic items. More high-end tailors, such as Dream Girl Tailors charge 60 dirham for a shirt or trouser or around 150 dirham for a dress. Other high-end items such as traditional colourful embroidered lady slippers can range between 65 and 200 dirham.
