= Dubai Gold District =

Commercial and retail district in Dubai, United Arab Emirates

- حي دبي للذهب
- Location: Deira, Dubai, United Arab Emirates
- Opened: 2026
- Developer: Ithra Dubai
- Num. of stores: More than 1,000
- Website: dubaigolddistrict.com

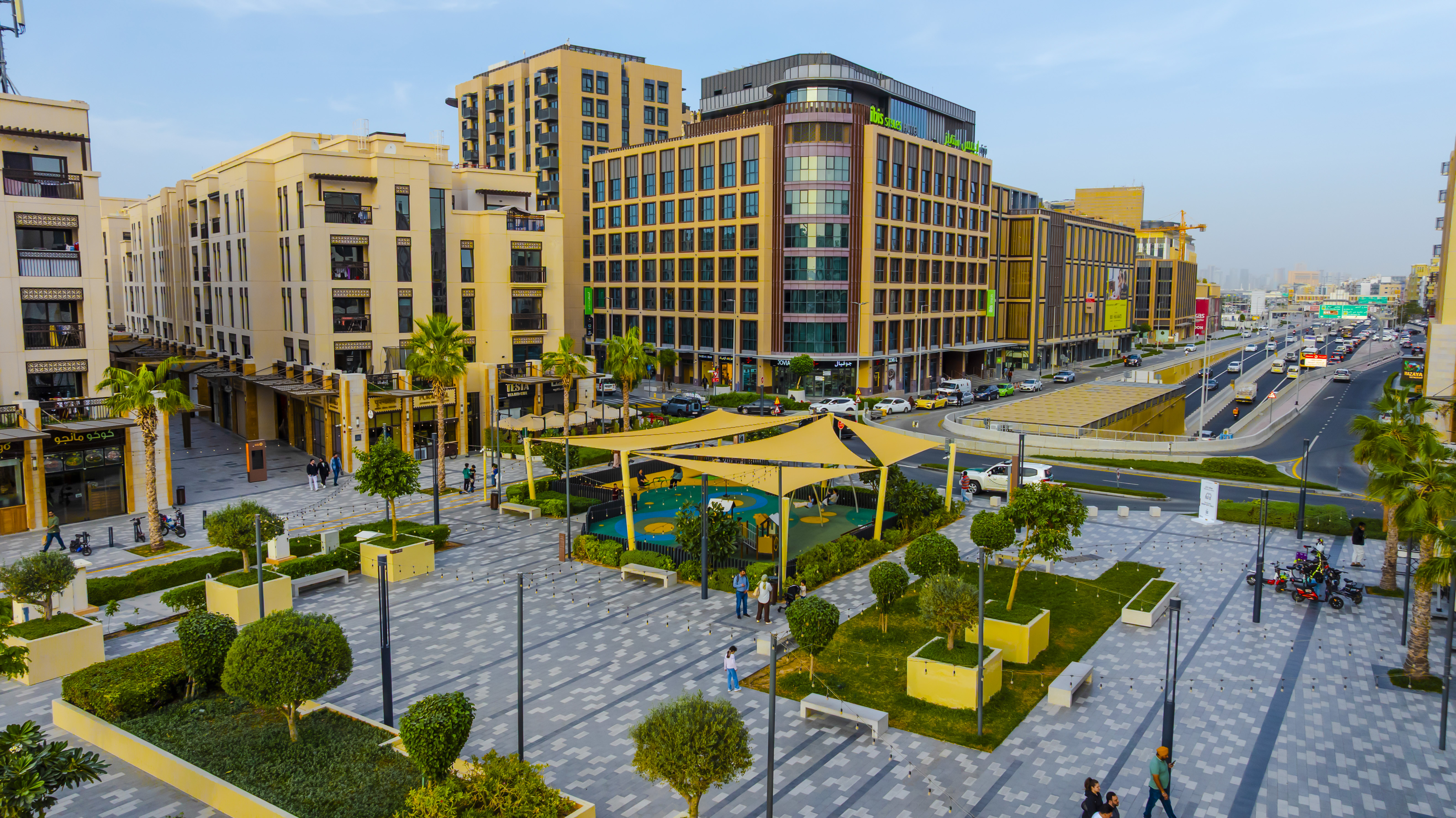
Dubai Gold District

Dubai Gold District is a commercial and retail district in Dubai, United Arab Emirates, focused on the gold, jewellery, bullion, and precious metals trade. Located in the historic Deira area, the district was developed by Ithra Dubai as part of broader redevelopment initiatives in Old Dubai and the Deira enrichment projects.

The district was launched in 2026 as a purpose-built destination intended to consolidate retail jewellery, bullion trading, wholesale activity, and investment-related services within a single commercial hub.

== History ==
In 2018, Ithra Dubai announced an extension and redevelopment of the Gold Souk area as part of the first phase of its ambitious Deira Enrichment Project to modernise and expand the commercial infrastructure surrounding the historic gold market area in Deira. The development forms part of urban regeneration projects in Old Dubai aimed at preserving the district's commercial heritage while expanding retail, hospitality, and tourism facilities.

In January 2026, Ithra Dubai officially launched Dubai Gold District in the presence of representatives from the Investment Corporation of Dubai, Dubai Chambers, and the Dubai Free Zones Council.

== Overview ==
Dubai Gold District was designed as a mixed-use commercial destination integrating multiple segments of the gold and jewellery industry, including retail jewellery, bullion trading, wholesale trade, investment services and traditional and bespoke jewellery. The district includes more than 1,000 retailers across jewellery, gold, perfume, cosmetics, and lifestyle categories. Retailers operating within the district include jewellery companies such as Kalyan Jewellers, Malabar Gold and Diamonds, Joy Alukkas, Tanishq, Jawhara Jewellery, Gold Trade and Al Romaizan.

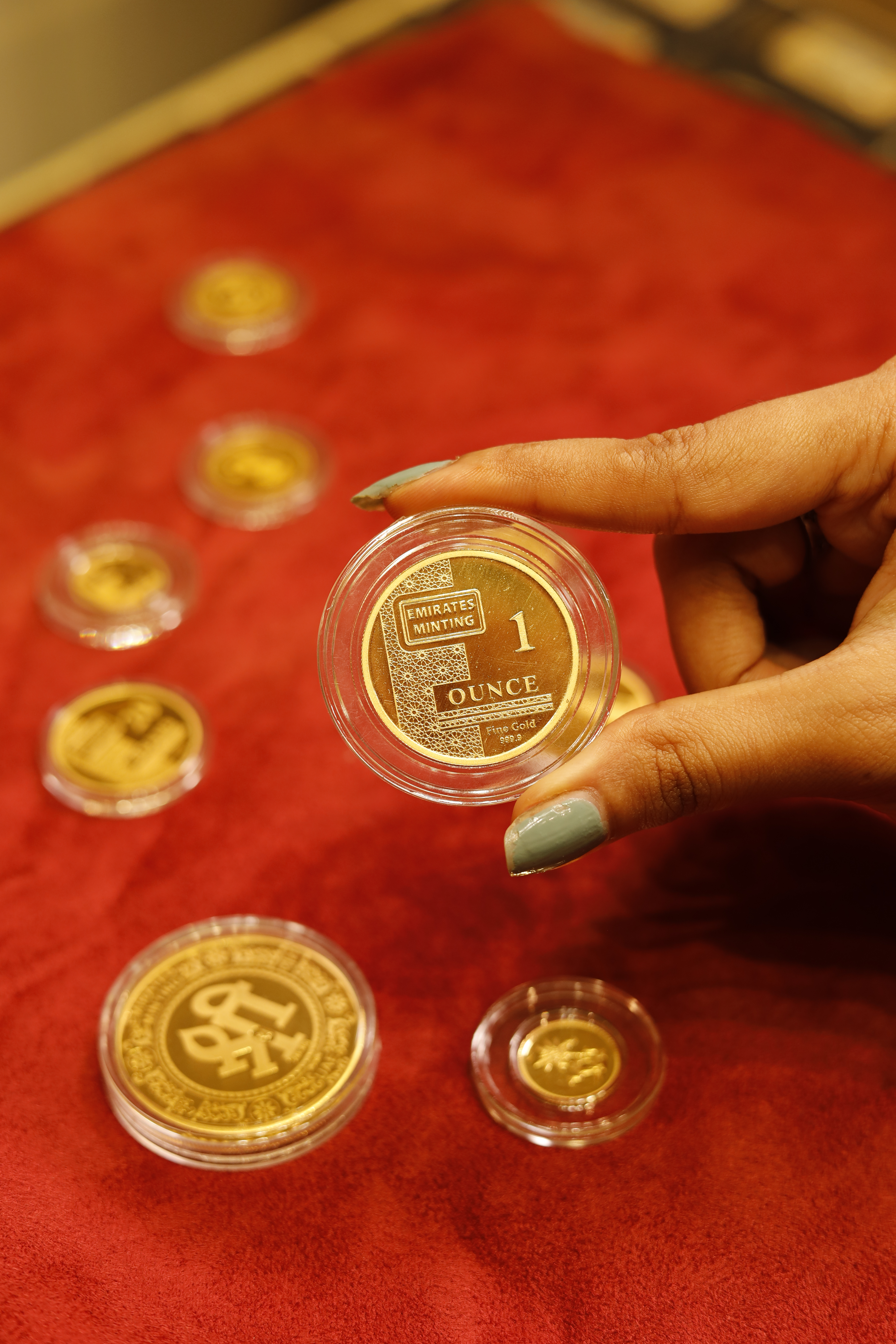
Limited-edition gold coins inspired by UAE pride

In January 2026, the Gold Street project was announced as part of the Dubai Gold District redevelopment initiative, described as the world's first "gold street" and forming part of the redevelopment and expansion of Dubai's historic Gold Souk area.

The development also includes hospitality and tourism infrastructure, including six hotels and more than 1,000 hotel guest rooms intended to support international visitors, traders, and buyers. In March 2026, the Dubai Gold District launched a "work-from-hotel" staycation initiative, an alternative to working from home allowing residents to use hotel spaces as temporary work environments with access to shared workspaces, leisure facilities, and discounted dining at participating properties.

== Community Significance ==
Emirates Minting Factory launched a limited-edition gold and silver coin collection in collaboration with Dubai Gold District, with proceeds set to benefit Ferjan Dubai, a social enterprise focused on community development across Dubai.

== Key Attractions ==
The Dubai Gold District houses some of UAE's new attractions to add value to the tourism sector and the real-estate sector.

=== Gold Street ===
Dubai Gold District is famously building a gold street where the entire street is planned to be made of gold. Developers said the Gold Street will be constructed using gold elements and is intended to form a central attraction within the district.

=== Dubai Gold ATM ===
Automated gold vending machines, commonly referred to as "Gold ATMs" allow retail customers to purchase certified gold bars and coins at real-time pricing. The primary unit operates inside the Emirates Palace Mandarin Oriental, Abu Dhabi.

=== Jewel of Joy ===
Jewel of Joy

The Dubai Gold District houses the Middle East's biggest jewellery showroom spanning 25,000 sq. ft., named the "Jewel of Joy". The showroom is privately owned by the Joy Alukkas Group.

== See also ==
- Dubai Gold Souk
- Economy of Dubai
