= Four Points by Sheraton Sheikh Zayed Road, Dubai =

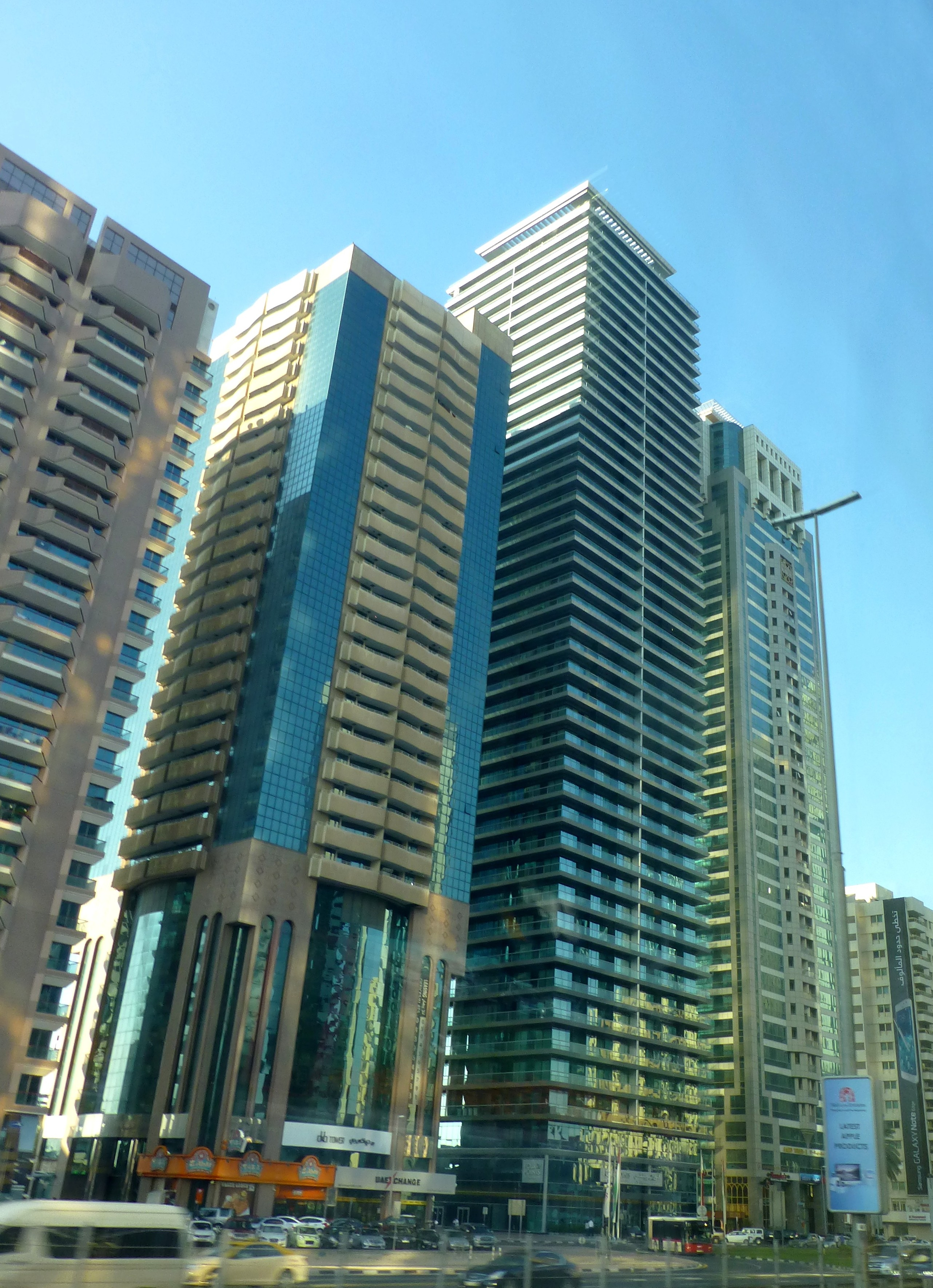
- Interactive map of the Four Points by Sheraton Sheikh Zayed Road, Dubai area

General information
- Type: Hotel
- Location: Sheikh Zayed Road, Dubai, United Arab Emirates
- Coordinates: 25°12′50.32″N 55°16′33.54″E
- Construction started: 2005
- Completed: 2007

Height
- Roof: 166 m (545 ft)

Technical details
- Floor count: 43

Design and construction
- Architect: Arenco Architectural & Engineering Consultants
- Main contractor: Al Shafar General Contracting Co (L.L.C.)

The Four Points by Sheraton Sheikh Zayed Road, Dubai, previously the Golden Sands Tower, is a 43-floor hotel in Dubai, United Arab Emirates. The building, constructed of steel and glass, has a total structural height of 166 m (545 ft), and currently stands as the 40th-tallest structure in the Dubai. Construction of the tower began in 2005 and was completed in early 2007. The hotel is operated by Marriott International, and stands as one of the tallest all-hotel structures in the city.

== History ==
The Four Points by Sheraton Sheikh Zayed Road, Dubai was originally proposed for construction as the Golden Sands Tower, a 43 floor all-residential apartment tower; it began construction in 2004, with estimated completion in 2006. Starwood was contracted to manage the property after construction had already begun, and the building was subsequently renamed Four Points by Sheraton Sheikh Zayed Road, Dubai. The building plans were revised to contain both hotel and residential units, as well as a helipad. However, plans for the residential units were later abandoned. The building was structurally completed in early 2007 and fully completed later that year.

The hotel is one of three operated by the Marriott under the Four Points brand in Dubai, the others being the Four Points by Sheraton Downtown Dubai and the Four Points by Sheraton Production City, Dubai.

== See also ==
- List of tallest buildings in Dubai
