= Dubai Gold Souk =

Marketplace in Dubai specifically for gold

Coordinates: 25°16′18″N 55°17′55″E

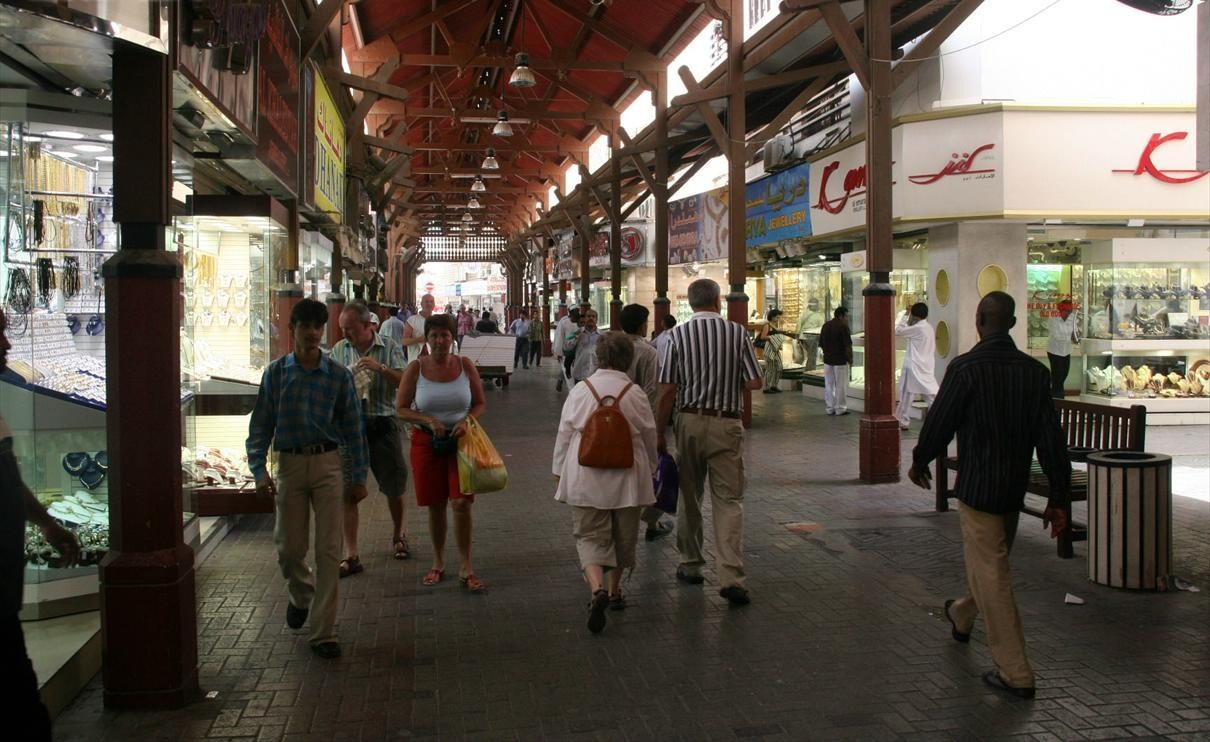
Dubai Gold Souk has narrow lanes that are lined with hundreds of jewelry stores.

Dubai Gold Souk or Gold Souk (Arabic: سوق الذهب), is a traditional market (or souk) in Dubai, UAE. The souk is located in Dubai's commercial business district in Deira, in the locality of Al Ras. The souk consists of over 380 retailers, most of whom are jewelry traders. As of 2020, some of the shops are four decades old, while others are new. The market mainly deals in the sale of gold, platinum, and silver jewelry as well as bullion; loose diamonds and color stones are also sold.

Dubai Gold Souk is bordered to the north by the Dubai Fish and Vegetable Market and the Deira Corniche near Baniyas Square at Sikkat al-Khali Street which is in close proximity to the Deira Bus Stand. On the other side of the Dubai Creek lies Dubai Textile Souk.

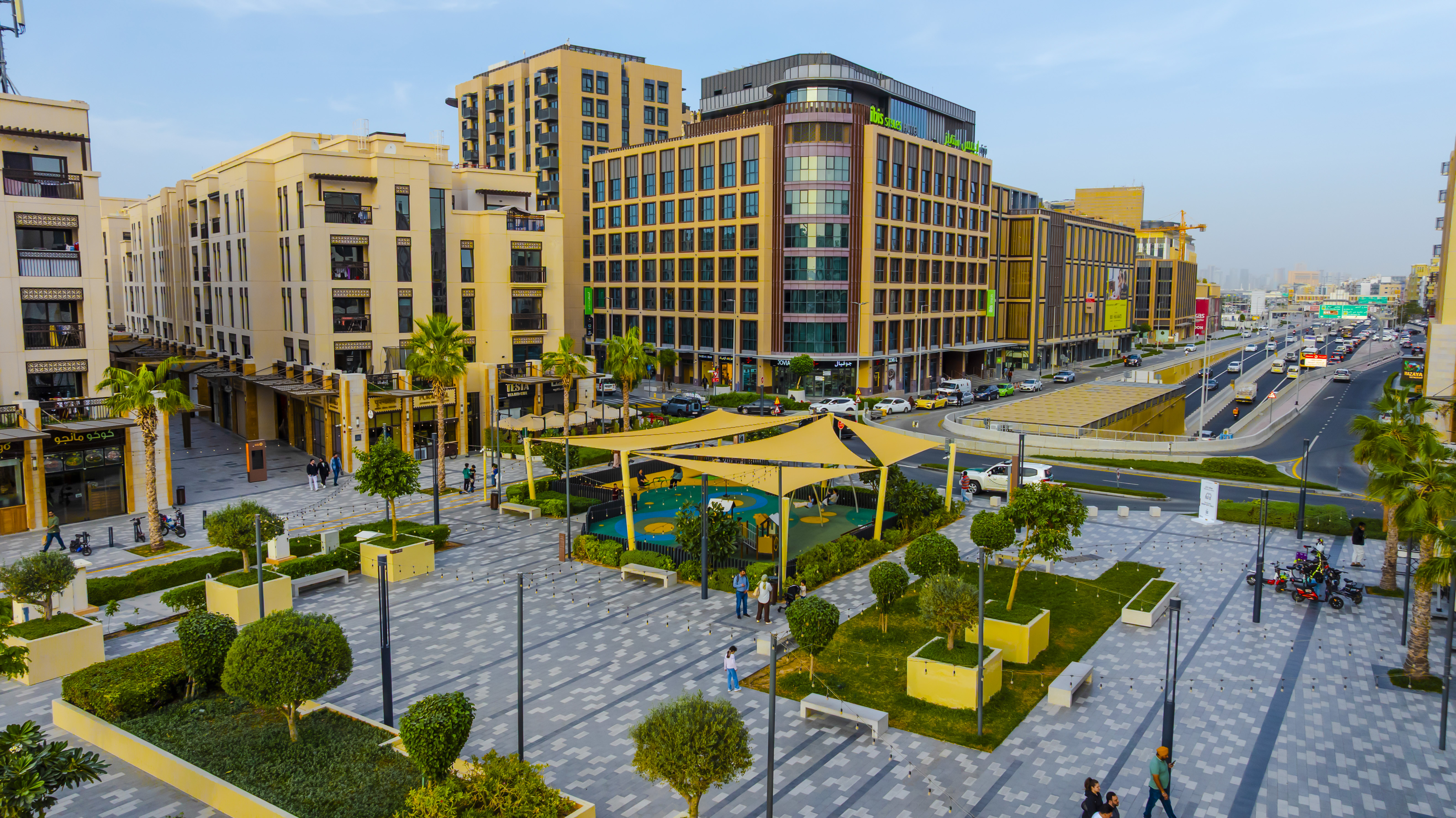
Dubai Gold District

As of September 2024, the Souk was soon to be renovated. The Dubai Municipality plans to make Dubai Gold Souk an upbeat tourist destination including the expansion of the latest Dubai Gold District.

== History ==
Not much is officially recorded about the history of the Dubai Gold Souk prior to the formation of the United Arab Emirates. It was informally formed back in the early 1900s as a handful of merchants set up shop on Dubai's creek. Across its many years and until this day it has undergone several changes. Around the 1940s, the Dubai Gold Souk grew as trade in gold due to Dubai's free trade policies that encouraged entrepreneurs from India and Iran to set up stores there. With the dredging of the Dubai Creek in 1963, discovery of oil in 1966, and formation of the United Arab Emirates in 1971 the trade and economy of Dubai flourished taking along with it the gold souk.

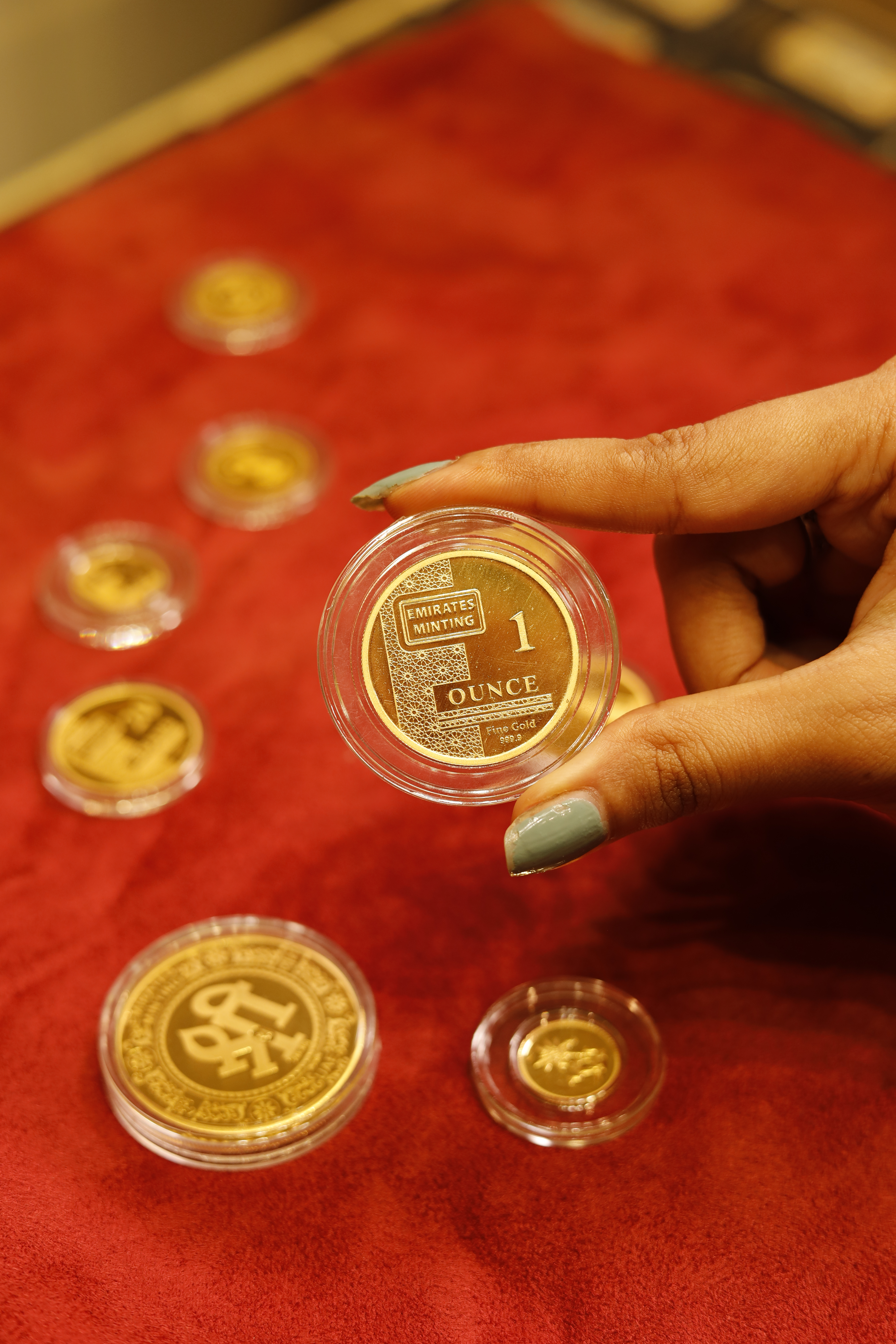
Limited-edition gold coins inspired by UAE pride

It continued to hold the central role of gold jewelry and bullion trade in the emirate of Dubai well into the early 2000s. It wasn't until the official formation of the Dubai Multi Commodities Center (DMCC) in 2002 and later the Dubai Gold and Commodities Exchange (DGCX) that a significant part of that role was transferred. It still retains the role of a key touristic spot and a location for both retail and wholesale trade today.

=== Community Significance ===
Emirates Minting Factory launched a limited-edition gold and silver coin collection in collaboration with Dubai Gold District, with proceeds set to benefit Ferjan Dubai, a social enterprise focused on community development across Dubai.

=== Guinness world record ===
The Dubai Gold Souk was host to the largest ring in the world weighing 64 kg (141 lb). The piece is owned by Dubai-based Taiba.

== Gallery ==
Images from the souk
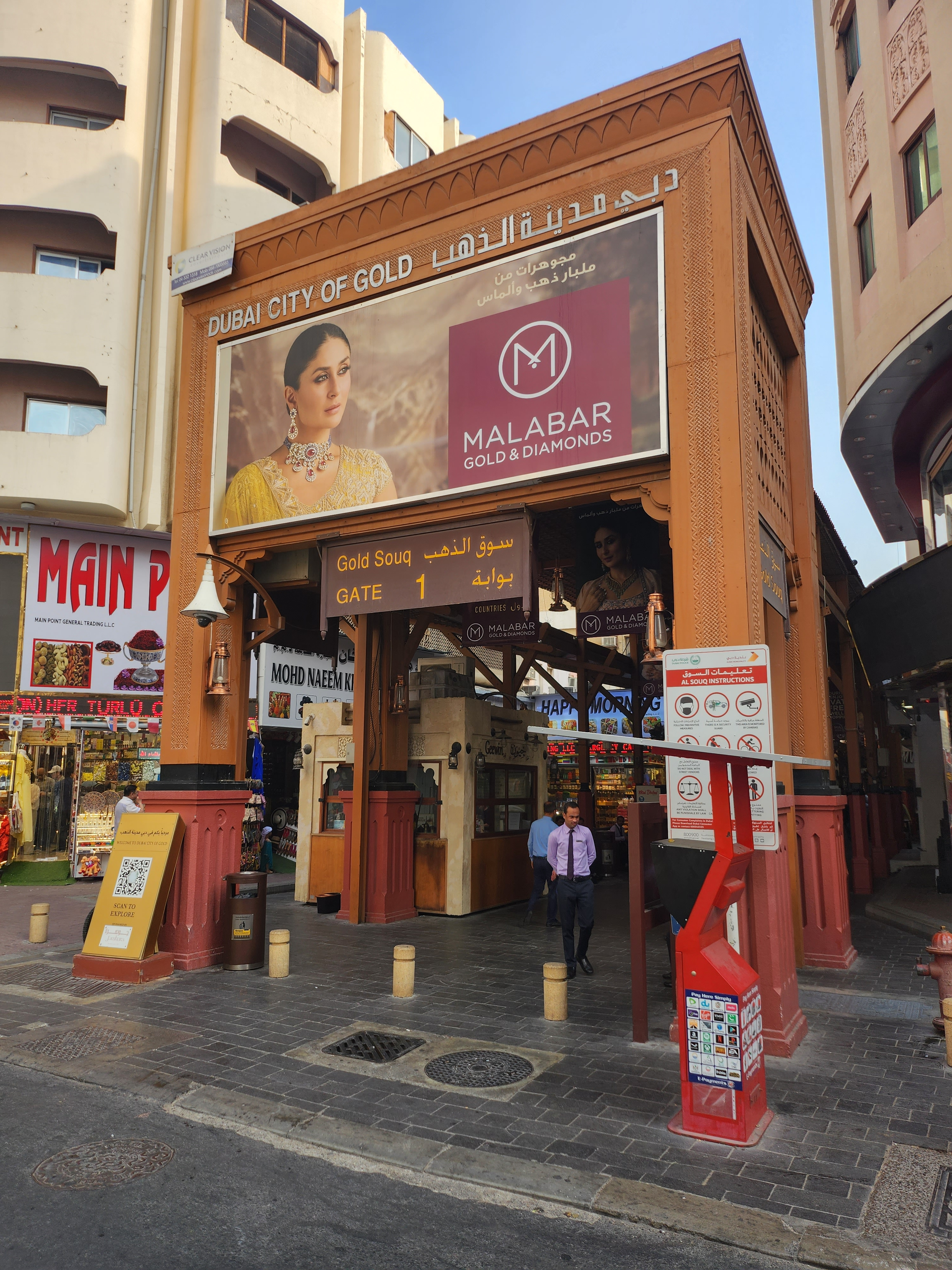
Dubai Gold Souk entrance

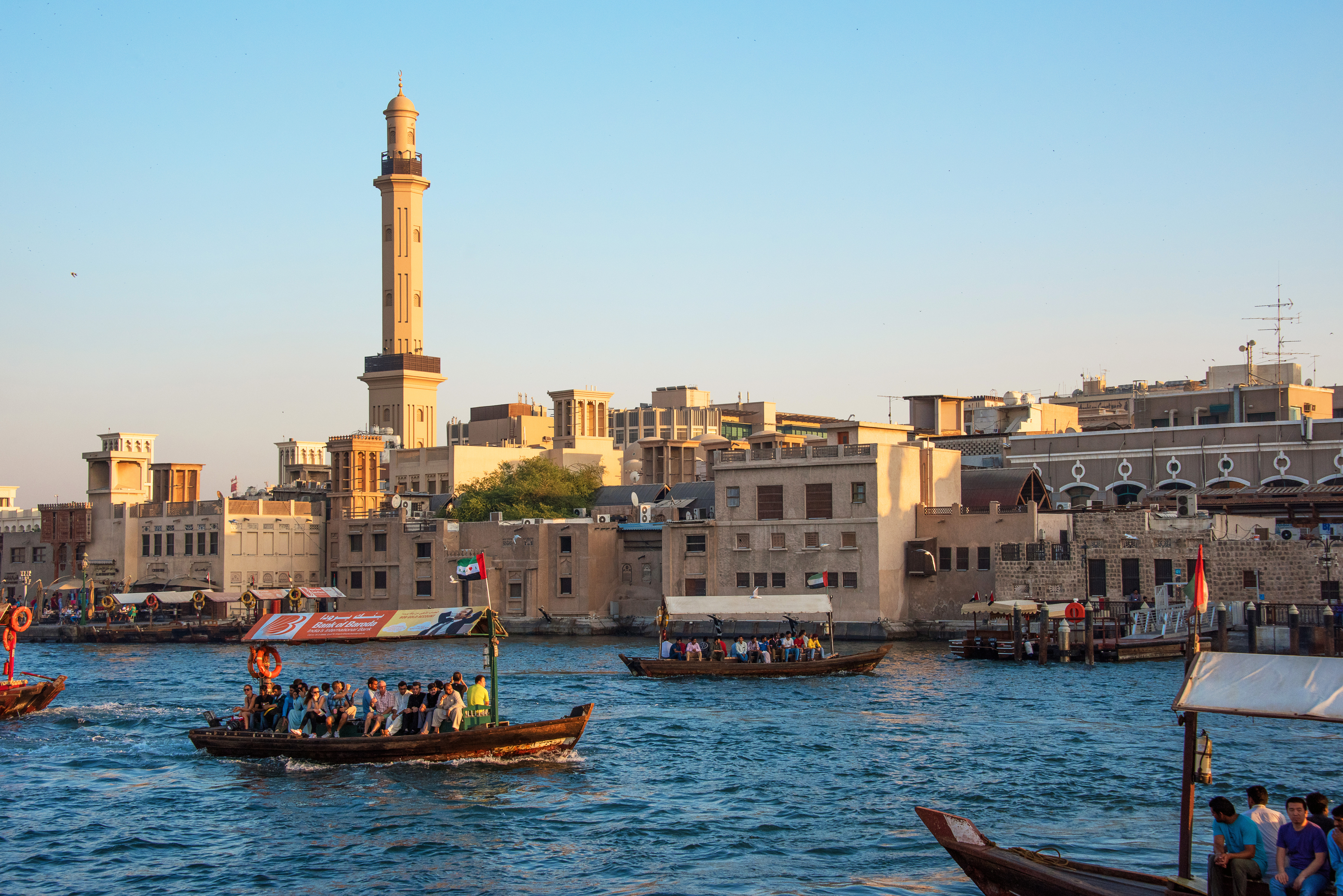
Dubai Creek with Dubai Spice Souk and Dubai Gold Souk in the background

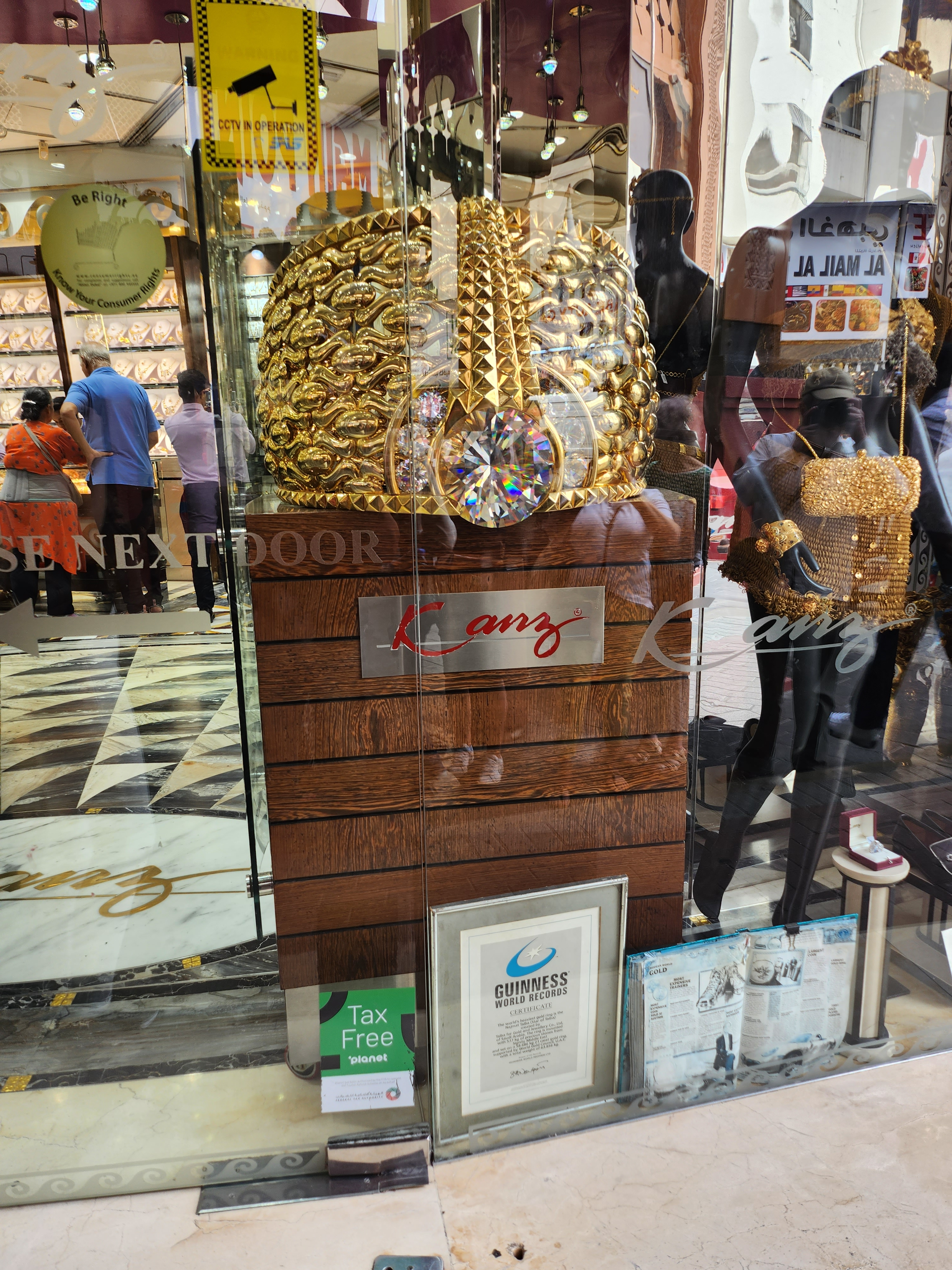
World's Heaviest Gold Ring in Dubai Gold Souk
