= Plaza de la Catedral =

Historical square in Havana, Cuba

Coordinates: 23°8′27.21″N 82°21′5.86″W

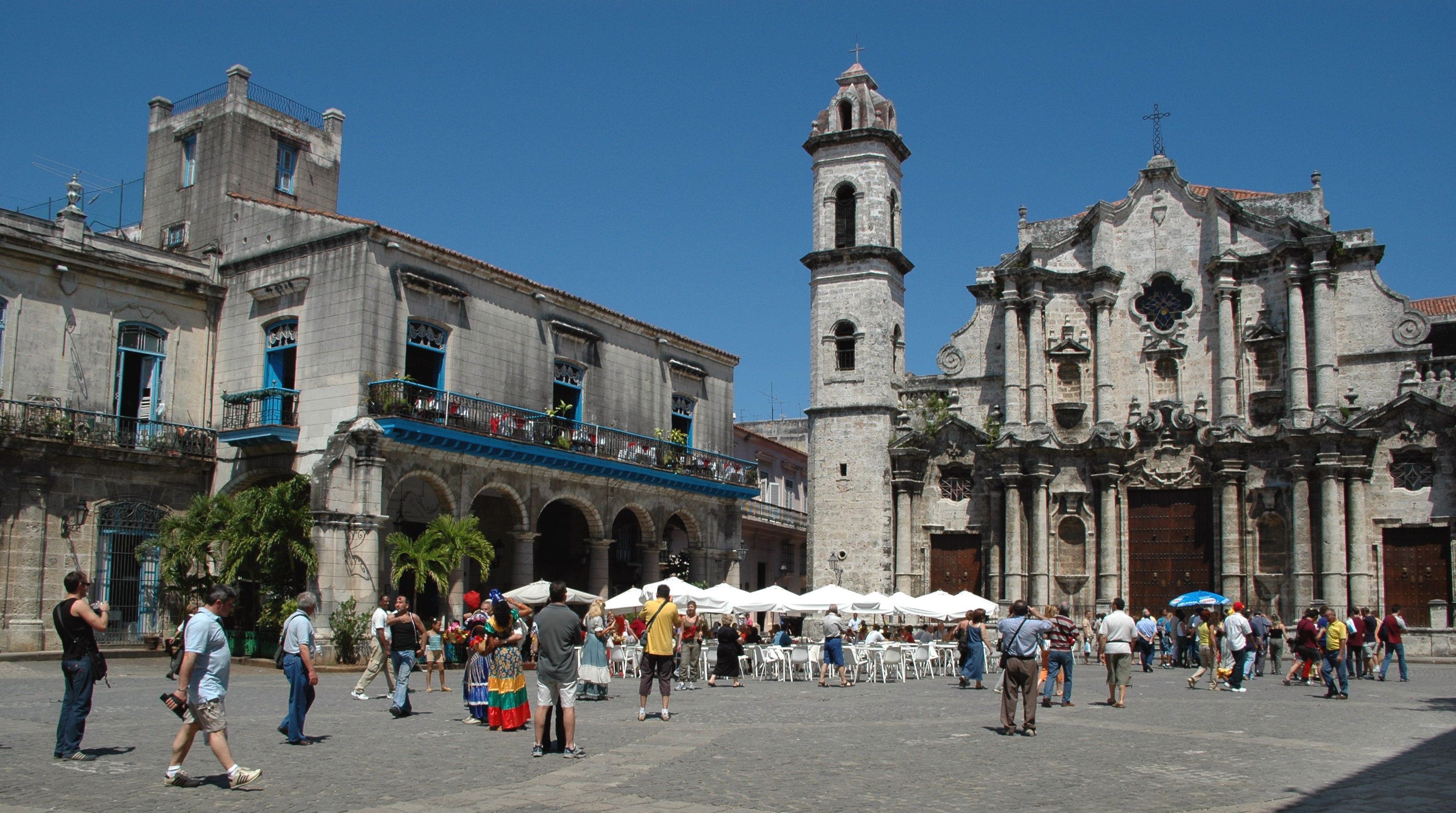
The Plaza de la Catedral and the front of the Cathedral of Havana

Plaza de la Catedral (English: Cathedral Square) is one of the four main squares in Old Havana and the site of the Cathedral of Havana from which it takes its name. Originally a swamp, it was later drained and used as a naval dockyard. Following the construction of the Cathedral in 1727, it became the site of some of the city's grandest mansions. It is the site of the Museo del Arte Colonial (Colonial Art Museum) and a number of restaurants.

One of the buildings on the Plaza is the Palacio del Conde Lombillo, in front of which there is a statue of the flamenco dancer Antonio Gades.

== Gallery ==
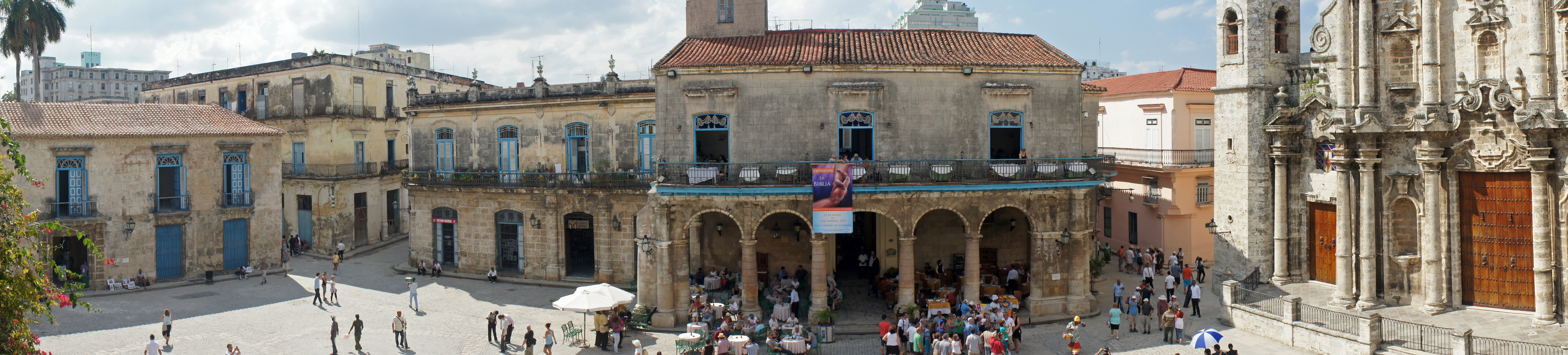
Panoramic view of Cathedral Square
