= The Amazing Race Australia 3 =

Season of television series

- Season 3
- Presented by: Grant Bowler
- No. of teams: 10
- Winners: Daniel Little & Ryan Thomas
- No. of legs: 10
- Distance traveled: 90,000 km (56,000 mi)
- No. of episodes: 10

Release
- Original network: Seven Network (AU); TVNZ (TV2) (NZ)
- Original release: 4 August – 25 September 2014

Additional information
- Filming dates: 7 March – 30 March 2014

Series chronology
- ← Previous; Season 2 Next → Season 4 (on Network 10)

The Amazing Race Australia 3 is the third season of The Amazing Race Australia, an Australian reality competition show based on the American series The Amazing Race. Officially titled The Amazing Race Australia v New Zealand and hosted by Grant Bowler, it featured ten teams of two, each with a pre-existing relationship (five from Australia and five from New Zealand), in a race around the world to win the grand prize of A$250,000.

This season visited six continents and ten countries and travelled over 90,000 kilometres (56,000 mi) during ten legs. Starting at Uluru, racers travelled through New Zealand, Cambodia, Thailand, Namibia, Russia, Portugal, Croatia, Argentina and the United States before returning to Australia and finishing in Port Campbell. New twists introduced in this season include awarding the winners of the first leg a second Express Pass that they had to give to another team, the Nation vs. Nation task and the Speed Bump. The season premiered on Australia's Seven Network on 4 August 2014 after The X-Factor and on New Zealand's TV2 on 5 August 2014 after My Kitchen Rules 5. The season concluded in Australia on 25 September 2014 and in New Zealand on 7 October 2014.

The finalists were all Australian teams, with intensive care nurses Daniel Little and Ryan Thomas winning this season. Dating turned-engaged bodybuilders Sally Yamamoto and Tyson Smith finished in second place, and newlyweds Ashleigh and Jarrod Jende finished in third place.

== Production ==
=== Development and Filming ===
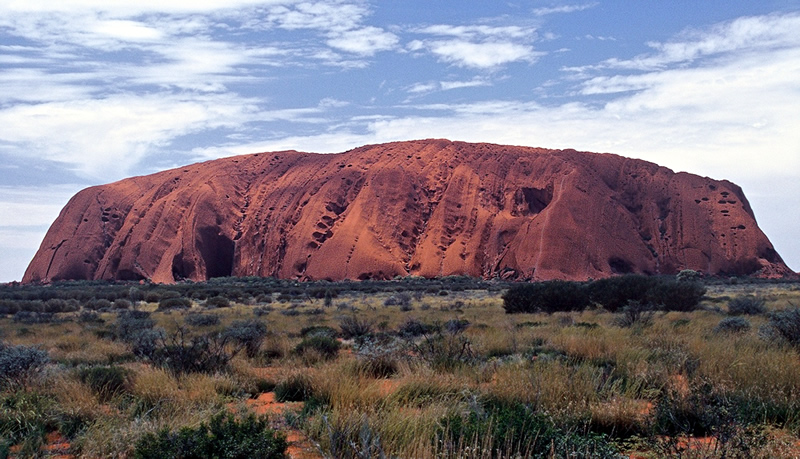
The Starting Line for The Amazing Race Australia v New Zealand took place near Uluru (also known as Ayers Rock) in Uluṟu-Kata Tjuṯa National Park.

On 14 August 2012, Seven Network announced it was looking for contestants for a third series of The Amazing Race Australia. Despite calling for contestant applications, the show was absent in the Seven Network's 2013 upfronts and was replaced by an unsuccessful revival of the Australian version of The Mole.

The series was renewed again on 22 October 2013. It was also announced that Seven's in-house production company, Seven Productions, would produce the series. ActiveTV, the production company involved in the show's first two series, would no longer be involved.

Filming began in March 2014 at Uluru in Uluṟu-Kata Tjuṯa National Park. Production wrapped on March 30, 2014, in Port Campbell, Victoria. This season travelled across six continents and ten countries, all of which were first-time visits, covering over 90,000 kilometres (56,000 mi).

Instead of being marked for elimination for finishing last in a non-elimination leg, the Speed Bump was introduced on this series. It required the team that finished last in a non-elimination leg to perform an additional task at some point during the next leg. The Salvage Pass also returned; however, it was awarded to the team that arrived first in the sixth leg rather than the first.

=== Casting ===
Applications for the third edition originally opened during the second season, despite the show not being officially renewed by Seven Network. When the show was officially renewed for 2014, applications opened again, including to citizens of New Zealand. Applicants who applied previously were given a chance to update their application. This second round of applications ended on 18 December 2013.

=== Marketing ===
Kathmandu, John West Tuna and Virgin Australia were the sponsors for this series.

== Cast ==
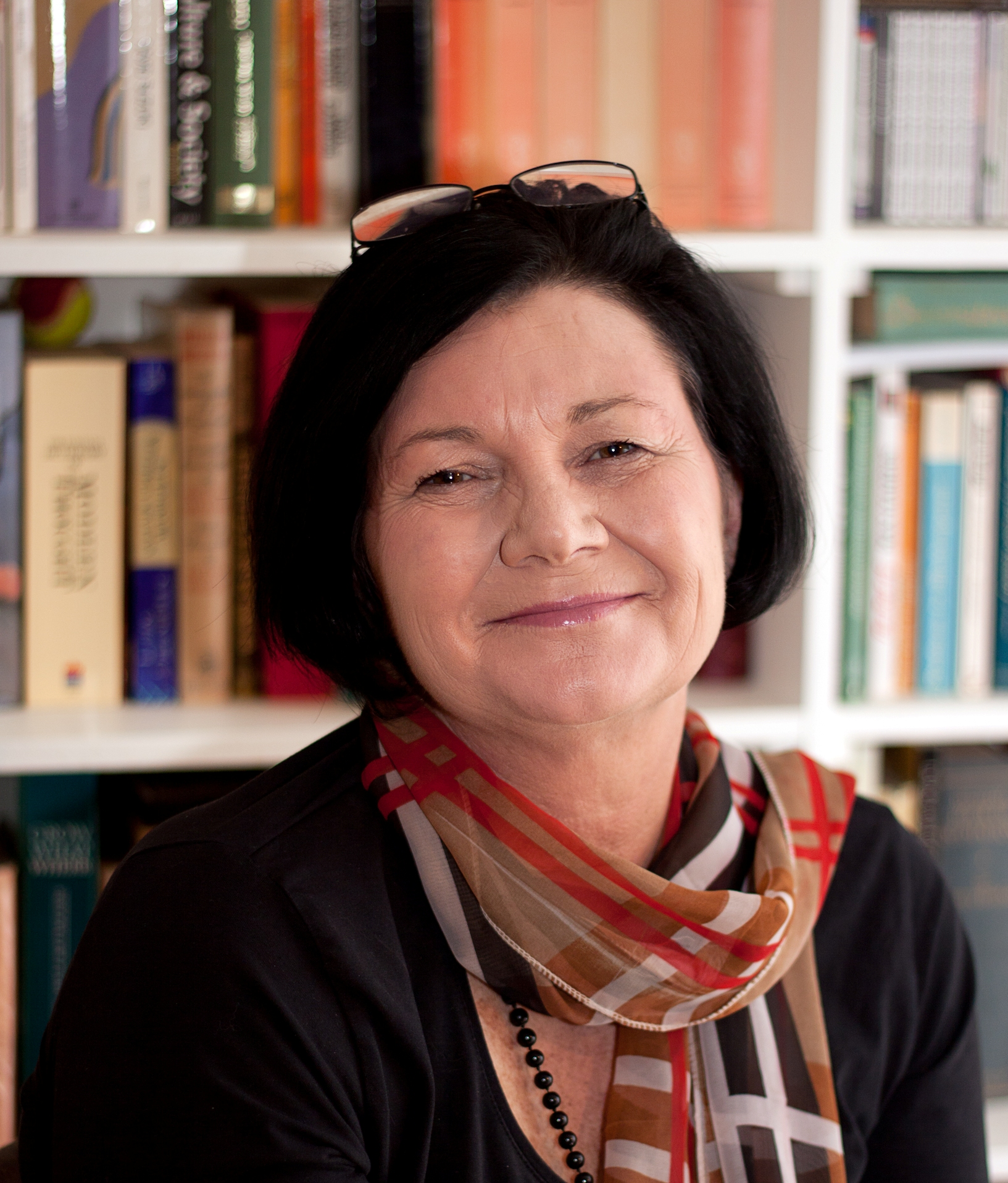
Elizabeth Grant

The cast included Jesse O'Brien, who was previously a contestant on the first season of New Zealand Idol. He withdrew from the season to attend to the birth of his daughter. He then returned for the second season. Well-known Australian anthropologist Elizabeth Grant participated with her son, Todd. During leg 6, Tyson Smith proposed to Sally Yamamoto on their fourth anniversary, and she accepted.

Contestants	Age	Relationship	Hometown	Status
Inga Lederhaus	27	Pageant Models	Perth, Western Australia	Eliminated 1st (in Mesopotamia, New Zealand)
Tiharna McGregor	26	Pageant Models	Perth, Western Australia	Eliminated 1st (in Mesopotamia, New Zealand)
Elizabeth Grant	50	Mother & Son	Adelaide, South Australia	Eliminated 2nd (in Siem Reap, Cambodia)
Todd Grant	25	Mother & Son	Adelaide, South Australia	Eliminated 2nd (in Siem Reap, Cambodia)
Aston Garratt	32	Feisty Friends	Auckland, New Zealand	Eliminated 3rd (in Koh Poda, Thailand)
Christie Orr	35	Feisty Friends	Auckland, New Zealand	Eliminated 3rd (in Koh Poda, Thailand)
Emily Trenberth	24	Siblings	Christchurch, New Zealand	Eliminated 4th (in Khomas Region, Namibia)
Jono Trenberth	26	Siblings	Christchurch, New Zealand	Eliminated 4th (in Khomas Region, Namibia)
John Charles	35	Best Mates	Christchurch, New Zealand	Eliminated 5th (in Kostroma, Russia)
Murray Roeske	35	Best Mates	Wellington, New Zealand	Eliminated 5th (in Kostroma, Russia)
Cat O'Brien	38	Foster Parents	Hamilton, New Zealand	Eliminated 6th (in Dubrovnik, Croatia)
Jesse O'Brien	36	Foster Parents	Hamilton, New Zealand	Eliminated 6th (in Dubrovnik, Croatia)
Carla Beazley	37	Fitness Mums	Tauranga, New Zealand	Eliminated 7th (in Tigre, Argentina)
Hereni Fulton	42	Fitness Mums	Tauranga, New Zealand	Eliminated 7th (in Tigre, Argentina)
Ashleigh Jende	27	Newlyweds	Melbourne, Victoria	Third place
Jarrod Jende	28	Newlyweds	Melbourne, Victoria	Third place
Sally Yamamoto	33	Dating Bodybuilders (Legs 1–6); Engaged Bodybuilders (Legs 6–10)	Perth, Western Australia	Runners-up
Tyson Smith	38	Dating Bodybuilders (Legs 1–6); Engaged Bodybuilders (Legs 6–10)	Perth, Western Australia	Runners-up
Daniel Little	28	Intensive Care Nurses	Sydney, New South Wales	Winners
Ryan Thomas	32	Intensive Care Nurses	Sydney, New South Wales	Winners

Future appearances

In 2019, Jonathan "Jono" Trenberth appeared on the third season of Married at First Sight NZ.

== Results ==
The following teams are listed with their placements in each leg. Placements are listed in finishing order.

- A red placement with a dagger (†) indicates that the team was eliminated.
- An underlined blue placement with a double-dagger (‡) indicates that the team was the last to arrive at a Pit Stop in a non-elimination leg and had to perform a Speed Bump task in the following leg.
- An italicized and underlined placement indicates that the team was the last to arrive at a Pit Stop, but there was no rest period at the Pit Stop and all teams were instructed to continue racing.
- A green ƒ indicates that the team won the Fast Forward.
- A purple ε indicates that the team used an Express Pass on that leg to bypass one of their tasks.
- A teal x indicates that the leg included the Nation vs. Nation task.
- A brown ⊃ indicates that the team used the U-Turn and a brown ⊂ indicates the team on the receiving end of the U-Turn.
- A violet + indicates that the teams encountered an Intersection.
- A purple § indicates that the team used their Salvage advantage.

Team placement (by leg)
Team	1x (Note: This leg featured a Nation vs. Nation task.)	2	3	4	5+ (Note: This leg featured an Intersection. The teams were paired up thusly: John & Murray and Ashleigh & Jarrod, Daniel & Ryan and Sally & Tyson, and Carla & Hereni and Cat & Jesse.)	6x	7	8	9	10
Daniel & Ryan	4th	3rd	3rd	6th	3rd	1st	1st§ (Note: This team used their Salvage advantage on this leg.)	3rdƒ (Note: This team won the Fast Forward on this leg.)	3rd	1st
Sally & Tyson	9th	4th	4th⊂ (Note: John & Murray chose to use the U-Turn on Sally & Tyson.)	5th	4th	3rd	4th	1st	2nd	2nd
Ashleigh & Jarrod	6th	7th	5th	3rd	2nd	2nd	5th‡	2nd	1st	3rd
Carla & Hereni	2nd	8th	6th	1stε (Note: This team used their Express Pass to bypass one of the tasks on this leg.)	5th	5th	2nd	4th	4th†	
Cat & Jesse	8th	5th	7th	4th	6th (Note: This team arrived last at the Pit Stop, but they were instructed to continue racing.)	4th	3rd	5th†		
John & Murray	1st	2ndε (Note: John & Murray initially arrived 1st, but had not paid their tuk-tuk driver. They were required to settle the bill before being allowed to check in. Emily & Jono checked in during this time, dropping John & Murray to 2nd.)	1st⊃	2nd	1st	6th†				
Emily & Jono	3rd	1st	2nd	7th†						
Aston & Christie	7th	6th	8th†							
Elizabeth & Todd	5th	9th†								
Inga & Tiharna	10th†									

== Race summary ==
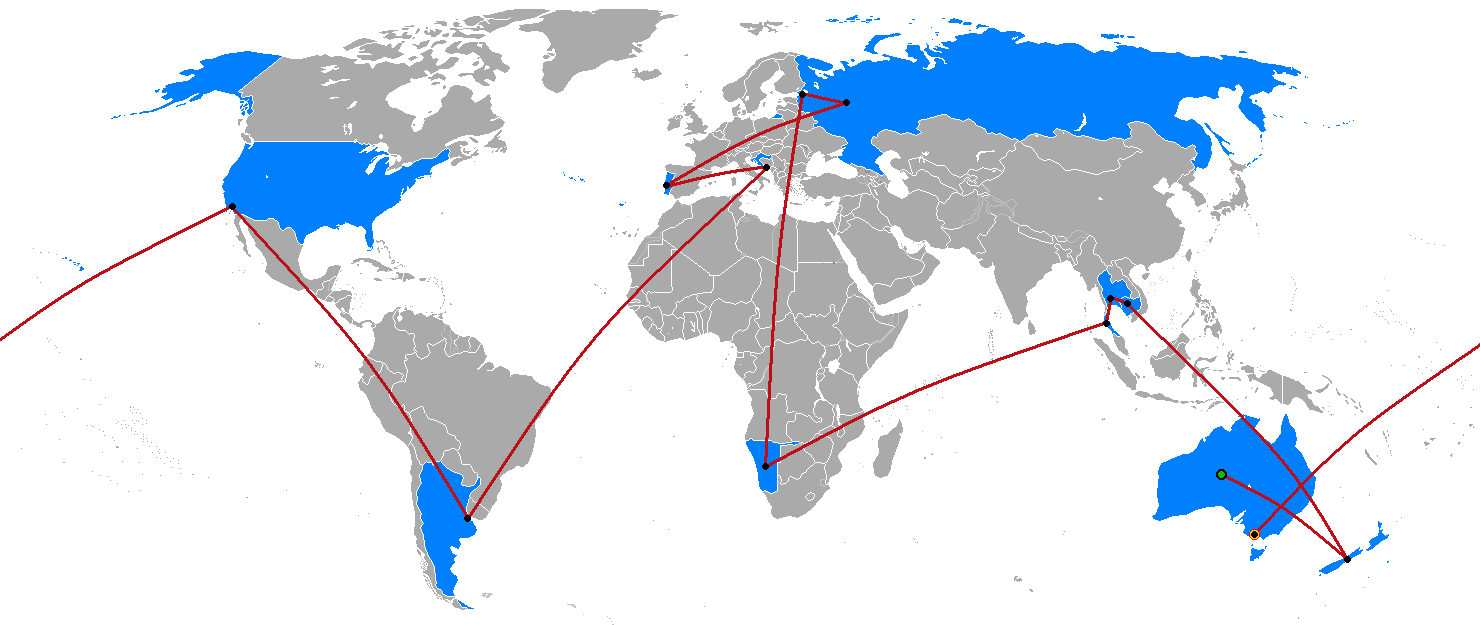
The route of The Amazing Race Australia 3 (Australia v New Zealand)

Destinations	Air travel Rail travel Water travel Bus travel Helicopter travel Bicycle travel Gondola travel
Route Markers	Detour Roadblock Fast Forward Nation vs. Nation; Intersection U-Turn Speed Bump Pit Stop

=== Leg 1 (Australia → New Zealand) ===
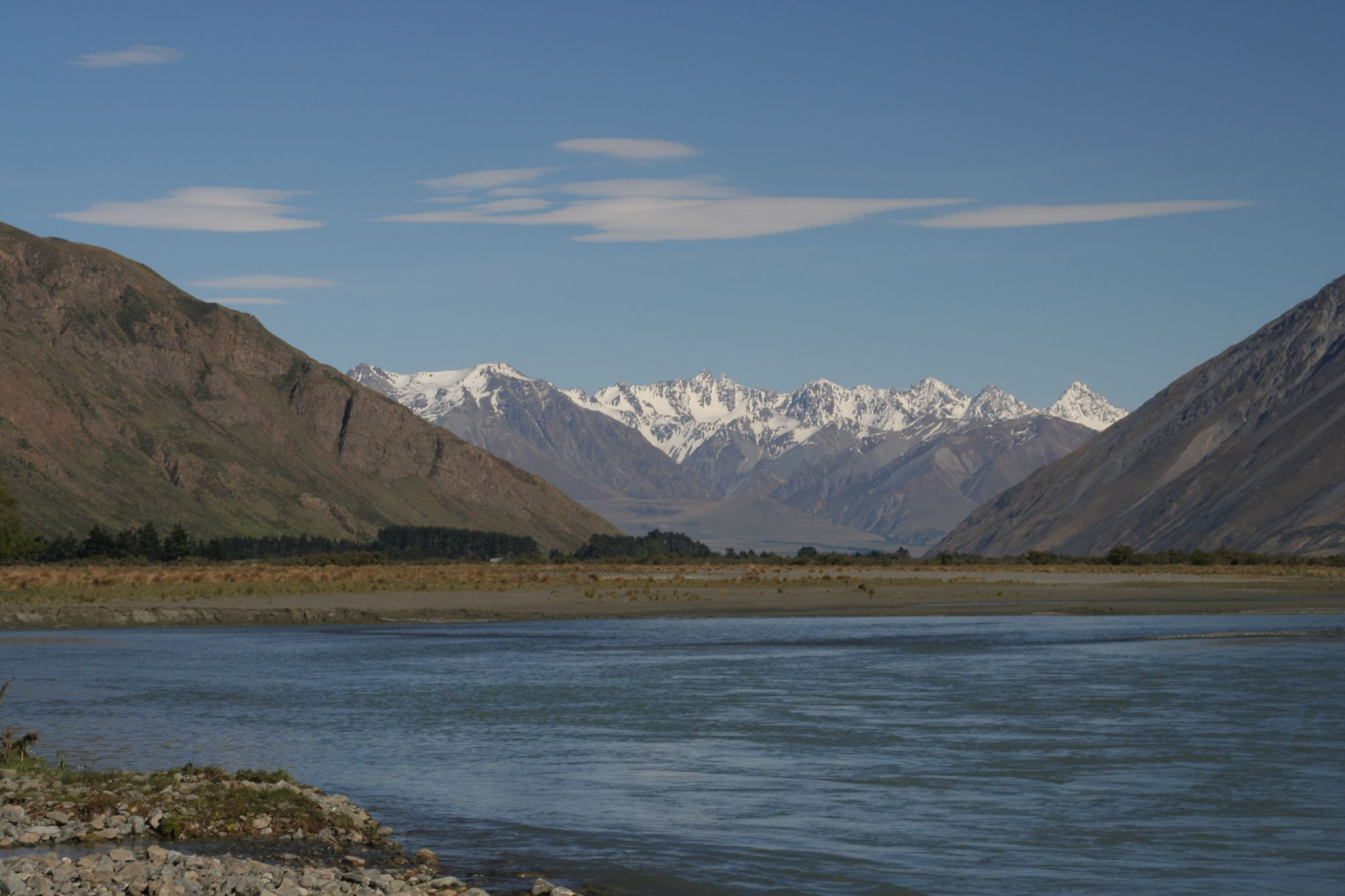
On the first leg, teams whitewater rafted down New Zealand's Rangitata River.

- Episode 1: "I Gotta Have Two Legs to Run the Race!" (4 August 2014)
- Prizes: Two Express Passes (one for themselves and the other to be given to another team) and two airline tickets to Los Angeles, California, in the United States (awarded to John & Murray)
- Eliminated: Inga & Tiharna

Locations

- Uluṟu-Kata Tjuṯa National Park, Northern Territory (Uluru) (Starting Line)
- Yulara (Ayers Rock Airport) → Christchurch, New Zealand
- Christchurch (Cardboard Cathedral)
- Peel Forest (Rangitata River – Rangitata Rafts)
- Mesopotamia (Rata Peak Station)
- Mesopotamia (Southern Alps)

Episode summary

- Teams began the race at the Uluru in the Uluṟu-Kata Tjuṯa National Park. In the series' first Nation vs. Nation task, the ten teams were divided into two groups based on their nationality to compete in a "Trans-Tasman tug of war". The first group to pull their opponents' flag past a marker was given a 10-minute head start to the airport. This task was won by the New Zealand teams.
- Teams were instructed to fly to Christchurch, New Zealand. Teams had to drive to Ayers Rock Airport and book one of two Virgin Australia flights, the first of which carried only four teams and arrived an hour before the second. Once in Christchurch, teams had to travel to the Cardboard Cathedral, where they had to choose one of three departure times for the following morning. The next morning, teams were given their next clue, had to find a marked vehicle and drove themselves to Rangitata Rafts on the Rangitata River. There, teams had to raft down grade five rapids and find one half of a ring from The Lord of the Rings in order to receive their next clue directing them to Rata Peak Station.
- In this season's first Roadblock, one team member had to drive a tractor through a slalom course and move four hay bales into a marked area. They then had to go to a sheep paddock and find the sheep who had the other half of their ring.
- The two halves of the ring told teams to "Continue west to the Pit Stop" in the Southern Alps.

=== Leg 2 (New Zealand → Cambodia) ===
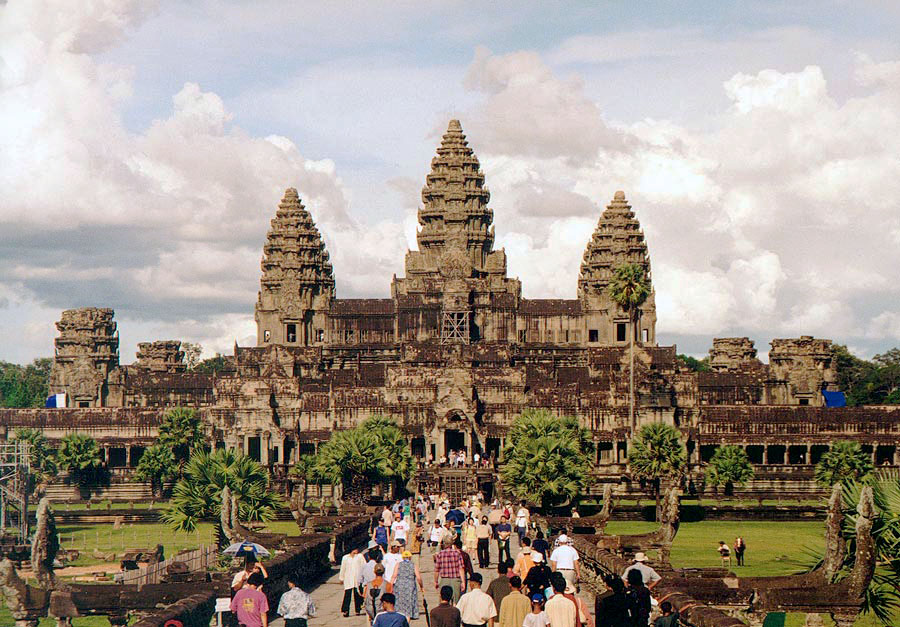
For the Roadblock in Cambodia, teams visited Angkor Wat, where they counted the temple's monks.

- Episode 2: "She's Got One Hell of a Body on Her and She Just Used It" (11 August 2014)
- Prizes: A A$10,000 voucher and two Velocity Frequent Flyer cards (awarded to Emily & Jono)
- Eliminated: Elizabeth & Todd

Locations

- Christchurch (Cathedral Junction)
- Christchurch → Siem Reap, Cambodia
- Siem Reap (Penny Lane – Old Market)
- Siem Reap (Tourist Information Center)
- Siem Reap (Angkor Wat)
- Siem Reap (Tjoup Snae Restaurant)
- Tonlé Sap (Fishing Port or Chong Khneas)
- Siem Reap (Baphuon)

Episode summary

- At the start of this leg, teams were instructed to fly to Siem Reap, Cambodia. Once there, teams had to travel to the Old Market, where they had to eat seven fried tarantulas, with each individual team member eating at least three, in order to receive their next clue. Teams then travelled by tuk-tuk to the Tourist Information Center in order to buy entry tickets to Angkor Wat, where they found their next clue. They were also provided with step counters that they had to wear for the duration of the leg. At the end of the leg, Daniel & Ryan won a 30-minute time-credit (applied at the start of the next leg) for having the closest number of steps between team members.
- In this leg's Roadblock, one team member had to count the monks wearing red and yellow prayer beads. Once they had counted all of the monks, they had to collect an offering and find two other monks inside the temple. The racer had to pick one of the two monks to whom to give their answer and their offering, but one of the monks would lie even if the racer had the right answer. Once the truth-telling monk was given the correct answer, he gave racers their next clue. John & Murray used their Express Pass to bypass this Roadblock.
- After the Roadblock, teams had to travel to Tjoup Snae Restaurant, where they had to record the readings on their step counters before retrieving their next clue.
- This season's first Detour was a choice between Shrimp or Shoot. In Shrimp, teams had to collect 750 grams (26 oz) of shrimp from fish traps in Tonlé Sap in order to receive their next clue. In Shoot, teams had to travel to the floating village of Chong Khneas and find the local pool hall, where they had to level out a pool table and then sink five balls while competing against a local player in order to receive their next clue.
- After the Detour, teams had to check in at the Pit Stop: Baphuon in Angkor.

=== Leg 3 (Cambodia → Thailand) ===
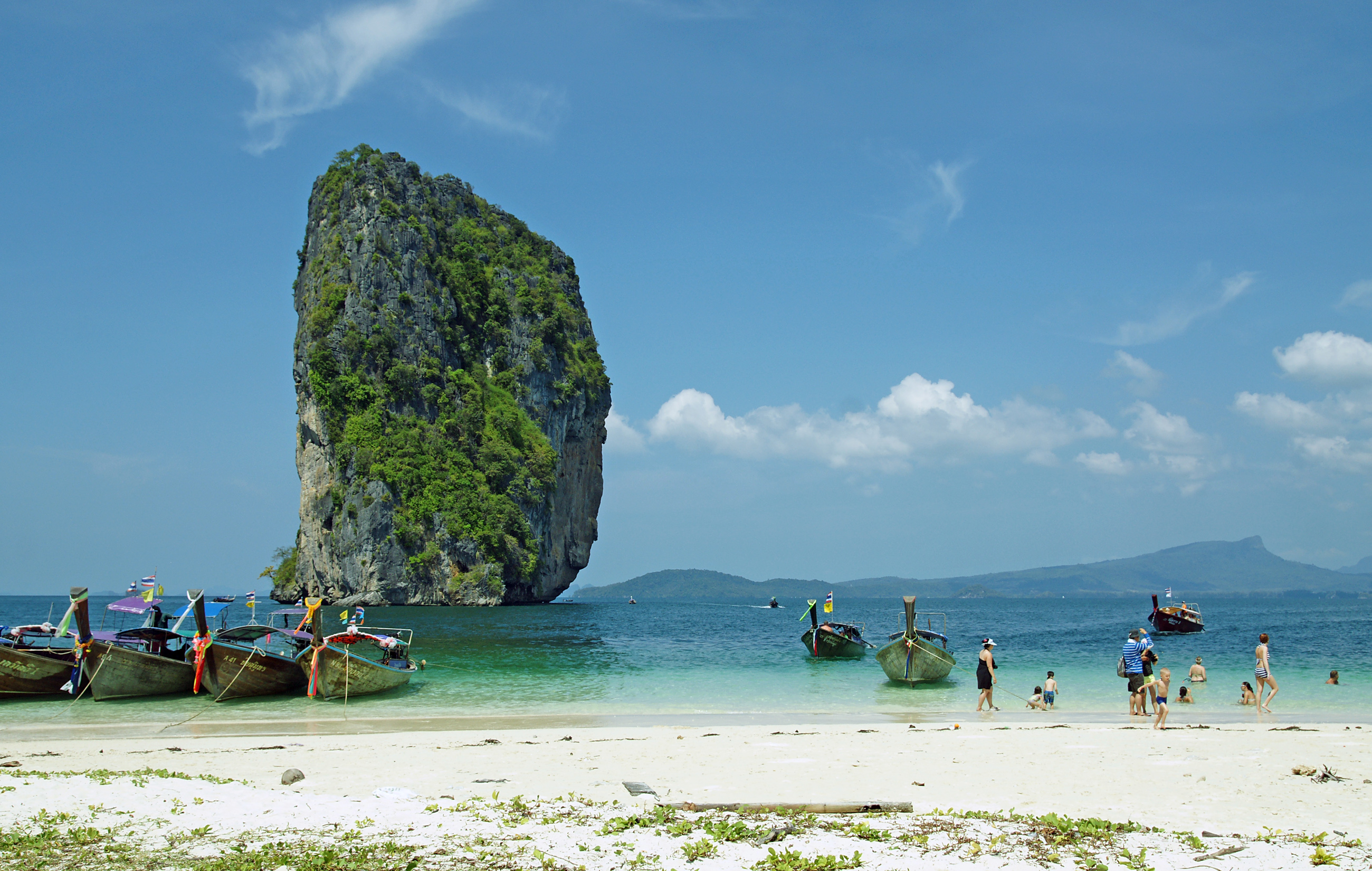
The island of Ko Poda served as the Pit Stop for this leg.

- Episode 3: "Proper Preparation Prevents Piss-Poor Performance" (18 August 2014)
- Prizes: Two tickets from Virgin Australia & Etihad Airways to one of their European destinations and A$5,000 (awarded to John & Murray)
- Eliminated: Aston & Christie

Locations

- Siem Reap (Cambodian–Vietnamese War Memorial)
- Poipet → Bangkok, Thailand
- Bangkok (Now Travel)
- Bangkok → Krabi
- Ao Nang (Thai Thai Massage)
- Ao Phang Nga National Park (Phra Nang Beach)
- Ao Phang Nga National Park (East Railay Beach)
- Ao Phang Nga National Park (Chicken Island)
- Hat Noppharat Thara–Mu Ko Phi Phi National Park (Ko Poda)

Episode summary

- At the start of this leg, teams were instructed to travel by taxi to the Cambodia–Thailand border crossing in Poipet, cross on foot and then travel by bus to Bangkok, Thailand. Once there, teams had to find Now Travel in order to receive their next clue, which directed them to fly to Krabi. Once there, teams had to find Thai Thai Massage in Ao Nang, where they had to choose one of eight spa treatments written in Thai and without knowing how long the treatment would take. Once the treatment was complete, teams received their next clue.
- This leg's Detour was a choice between Climb Up or Drill Down. For both Detour options, teams had to travel by long-tail boat to Phra Nang Beach. In Climb Up, both team members had to scale a sheer rock face to retrieve an Amazing Race flag, which they could exchange for their next clue. In Drill Down, teams had to first build a hand drill and then use it to extract enough coconut juice from a pile of coconuts so as to fill a container in order to receive their next clue.
- After the Detour, teams had to travel to East Railay Beach in order to find their next clue.
- In this leg's Roadblock, teams had to travel to a marked area of the sea, where one team member had to dive down to the sea floor and retrieve a golden clam with a pearl, which contained their next clue directing them to the Pit Stop: the island of Ko Poda.

Additional note

- John & Murray chose to use the U-Turn on Sally & Tyson.

=== Leg 4 (Thailand → Namibia) ===
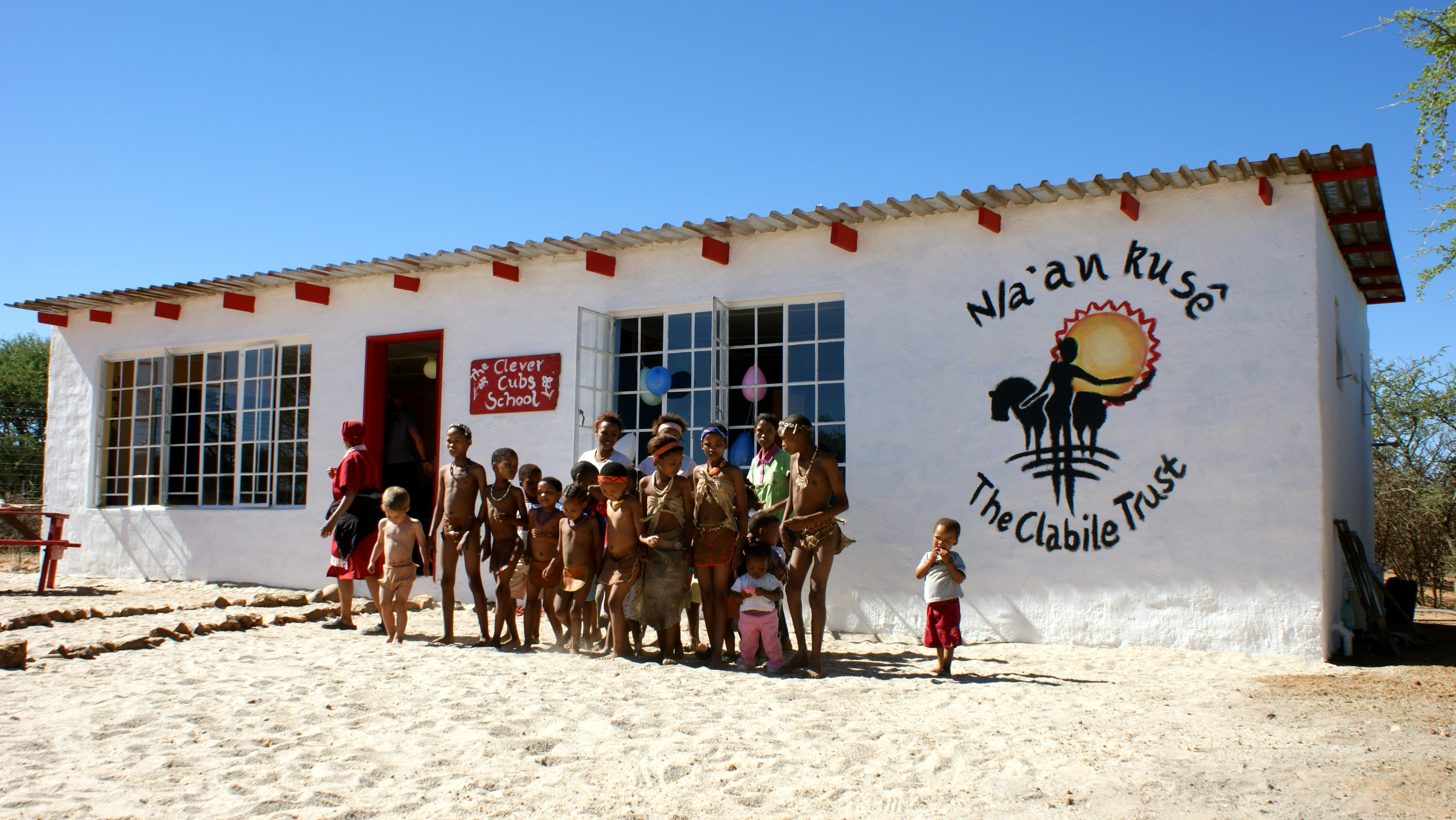
While in Namibia, teams had to sing in the local San language with the San children.

- Episode 4: "We Have A Lot of Experience with Poo" (25 August 2014)
- Prize: 500,000 Velocity Frequent Flyer points (awarded to Carla & Hereni)
- Eliminated: Emily & Jono

Locations

- Ao Nang (Ao Nang Beach)
- Krabi → Windhoek, Namibia (Hosea Kutako International Airport)
- Khomas Region (Na'an Kuse Wildlife Sanctuary – Baboon Walk)
- Khomas Region (Na'an Kuse Wildlife Sanctuary – Lion Enclosure)
- Khomas Region (Na'an Kuse Wildlife Sanctuary – Clever Cubs School)
- Khomas Region (Na'an Kuse Wildlife Sanctuary – Bushmen Village)
- Khomas Region (Na'an Kuse Wildlife Sanctuary – Watering Hole)

Episode summary

- At the start of this leg, teams were instructed to fly to Windhoek, Namibia. Once there, teams had to search the airport parking lot for a marked vehicle which contained their next clue. Teams were directed to drive to the Na'an Kuse Wildlife Sanctuary, where they had to lead two baboons along a marked path in order to receive their next clue.
- In this leg's Roadblock, one team member had to cut up a pile of offal and prepare the correct quantity to feed to a pride of lions in order to receive their next clue. Carla & Hereni used their Express Pass to bypass the Roadblock.
- After the Roadblock, teams had to go to the Clever Cubs School, where they had to learn a song in the local San language and perform it with the San children in order to receive their next clue.
- This leg's Detour was a choice between Pipe or Poo. For both Detour options, teams had to travel to a Bushmen village by donkey cart. In Pipe, teams had to use a traditional bush method to make a fire. Once the village chief was able to light his pipe, teams could receive their next clue. In Poo, teams had to play a local game called bokdrool, which required both team members to spit two dried springbok dung pellets across a line eight metres (26 ft) away in order to receive their next clue.
- After the Detour, teams had to check in at the Pit Stop at a nearby watering hole.

=== Leg 5 (Namibia → Russia) ===
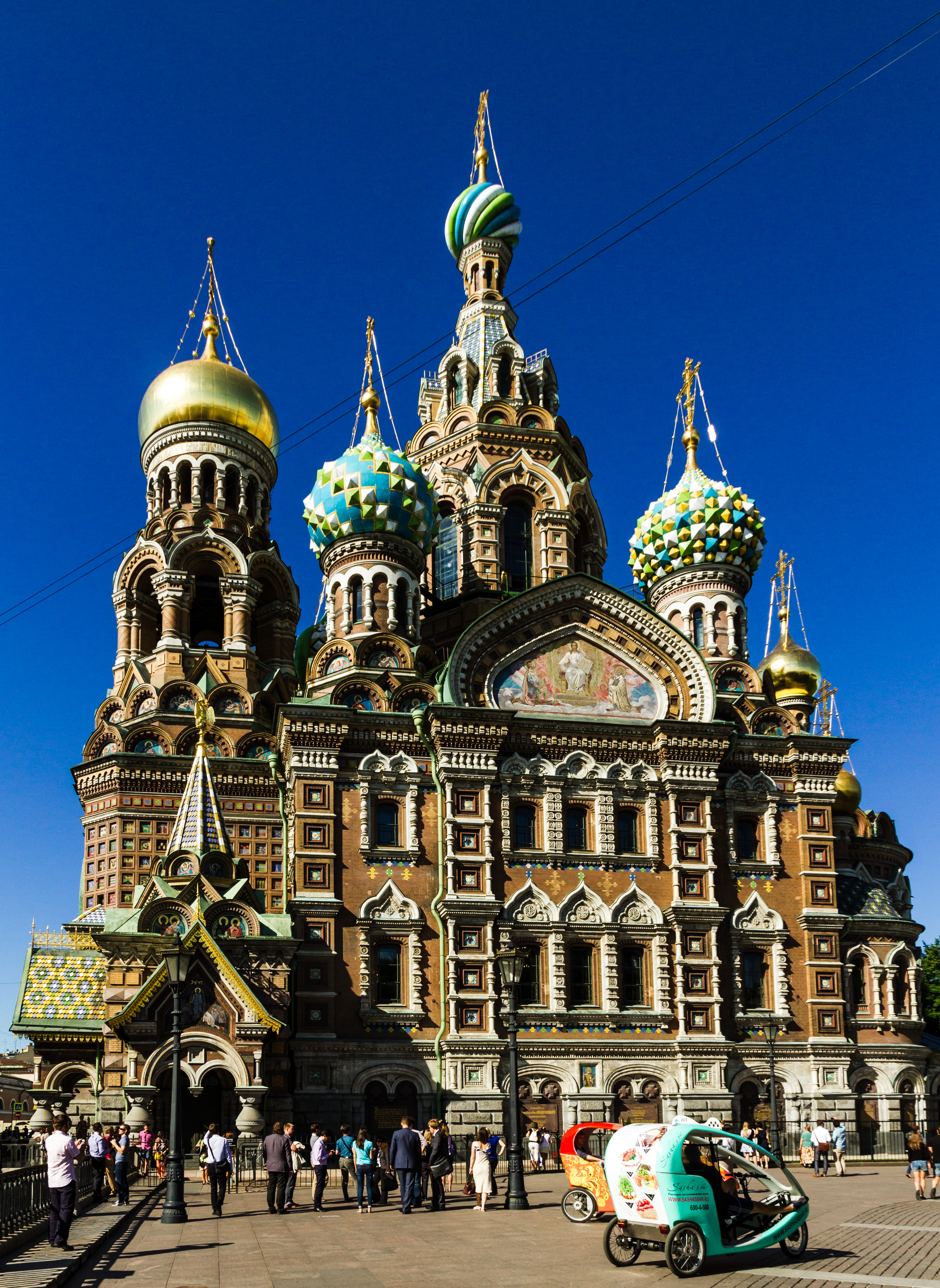
The Church of the Saviour on Spilled Blood in Saint Petersburg was the fifth Pit Stop.

- Episode 5: "Right Now I Don't Care If He Pees in His Pants" (25 August 2014)
- Prizes: First-class train tickets to their next destination for themselves and another team of their choice (awarded to John & Murray)

Locations

- Khomas Region (Na'an Kuse Wildlife Sanctuary – Lodge)
- Windhoek → Saint Petersburg, Russia
- Saint Petersburg (Battleship Aurora)
- Saint Petersburg (Nevsky Prospekt – Kazan Cathedral)
- Saint Petersburg (Beloselsky-Belozersky Palace)
- Saint Petersburg (Taleon Imperial Hotel – Imperial Ballroom)
- Saint Petersburg (Church of the Saviour on Spilled Blood)

Episode summary

- At the start of this leg, teams were instructed to fly to Saint Petersburg, Russia. Once there, teams had to travel to the battleship Aurora and then search for their next clue.
- In this leg's Roadblock, one team member had to decipher a message communicated by the ship commander from the top of the battleship in flag semaphore and written in the Russian Cyrillic alphabet – Russian: Не́вский проспе́кт, romanized: Nevsky Prospekt – in order to receive their next clue, which was a photograph of the Kazan Cathedral. Teams found their next clue at the cathedral.
- This leg's Detour was a choice between Cossack or Coat Rack. In Cossack, teams had to perform a traditional Cossack dance to the satisfaction of the instructor in order to receive their next clue. In Coat Rack, teams had to search through a pile of over three hundred tags to discover the one that was missing. They then had to then search the coats in the coat room for the missing tag, which they could exchange for their next clue.
- At the Taleon Imperial Hotel, teams encountered an Intersection, which required two teams to mutually join together to complete the following task. The teams were paired up thusly: John & Murray and Ashleigh & Jarrod, Daniel & Ryan and Sally & Tyson, and Carla & Hereni and Cat & Jesse. After pairing up, one team member from each of the two teams had to enter a vault full of highly sensitive lasers to retrieve a jeweled egg, which contained a small figurine of the Church of the Saviour on Spilled Blood as their only hint as to the location of the Pit Stop. After this task, teams were no longer joined.

Additional notes

- Due to limited availability of flights out of Namibia, teams were provided tickets for a flight to Saint Petersburg, but were under no obligation to use them.
- There was no elimination at the end of this leg; all teams were instead instructed to continue racing.

=== Leg 6 (Russia) ===
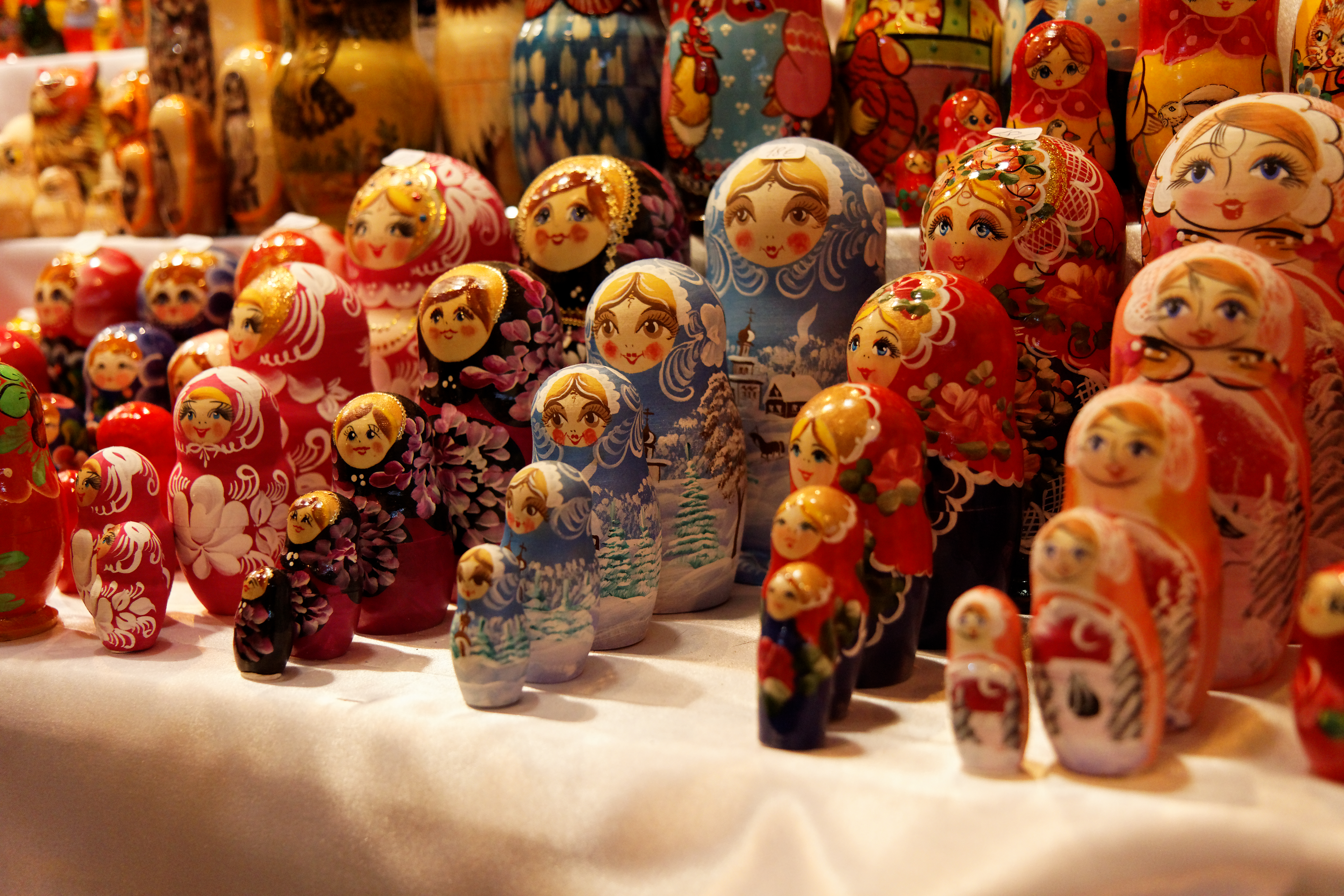
This leg's Nation vs. Nation task required teams to play with Russia's traditional doll, the matryoshka.

- Episode 6: "I'm Not Going to Come Last, I'm Just Going to Die on The Amazing Race" (1 September 2014)
- Prizes: A seven-night holiday for two to Phuket, Thailand, and the Salvage Pass (awarded to Daniel & Ryan)
- Eliminated: John & Murray

Locations

- (Trans-Siberian Railway) Saint Petersburg → Kostroma
- Kostroma (Museum of Wooden Architecture)
- Kostroma (Susaninskaya Square)
- Kostroma (Azimut Hotel Kostroma)
- Neysky District (Kotkishevo Village – North Hope Sled Dog Center)
- Kostroma (Confluence of Volga & Kostroma Rivers)

Episode summary

- Teams were instructed to travel on the Trans-Siberian Railway to Kostroma. Once there, they had to travel to the Museum of Wooden Architecture in order to find their next clue.
- In this season's final Nation vs. Nation task, teams from each country had to team up, select three matryoshka dolls and search among hundreds of other nesting dolls in five separate houses in order to find the four smaller pieces that belonged to each of the dolls that they had chosen. Once the three teams collected all twelve pieces, they all received their next clue.
- After the Nation vs. Nation task, teams had to travel to Susaninskaya Square, where they found their next clue.
- This leg's Detour was a choice between Boil or Build. In Boil, teams had to fill a Russian outdoor bathing kettle with water and use wood and paper scraps to light a fire underneath it. They then had to submerge themselves in the icy water in order to receive their next clue. In Build, teams had to stack a pile of firewood within a marked area so that it matched a sample pile in order to receive their next clue.
- In this leg's Roadblock, teams had to travel to the North Hope Sled Dog Center, where one team member had to ride a dog sled of Siberian Huskies and Alaskan Malamutes around a slalom course through the forest in order to receive their next clue directing them to the Pit Stop: the confluence of the Volga and Kostroma Rivers, overlooking the Ipatiev Monastery.

=== Leg 7 (Russia → Portugal) ===
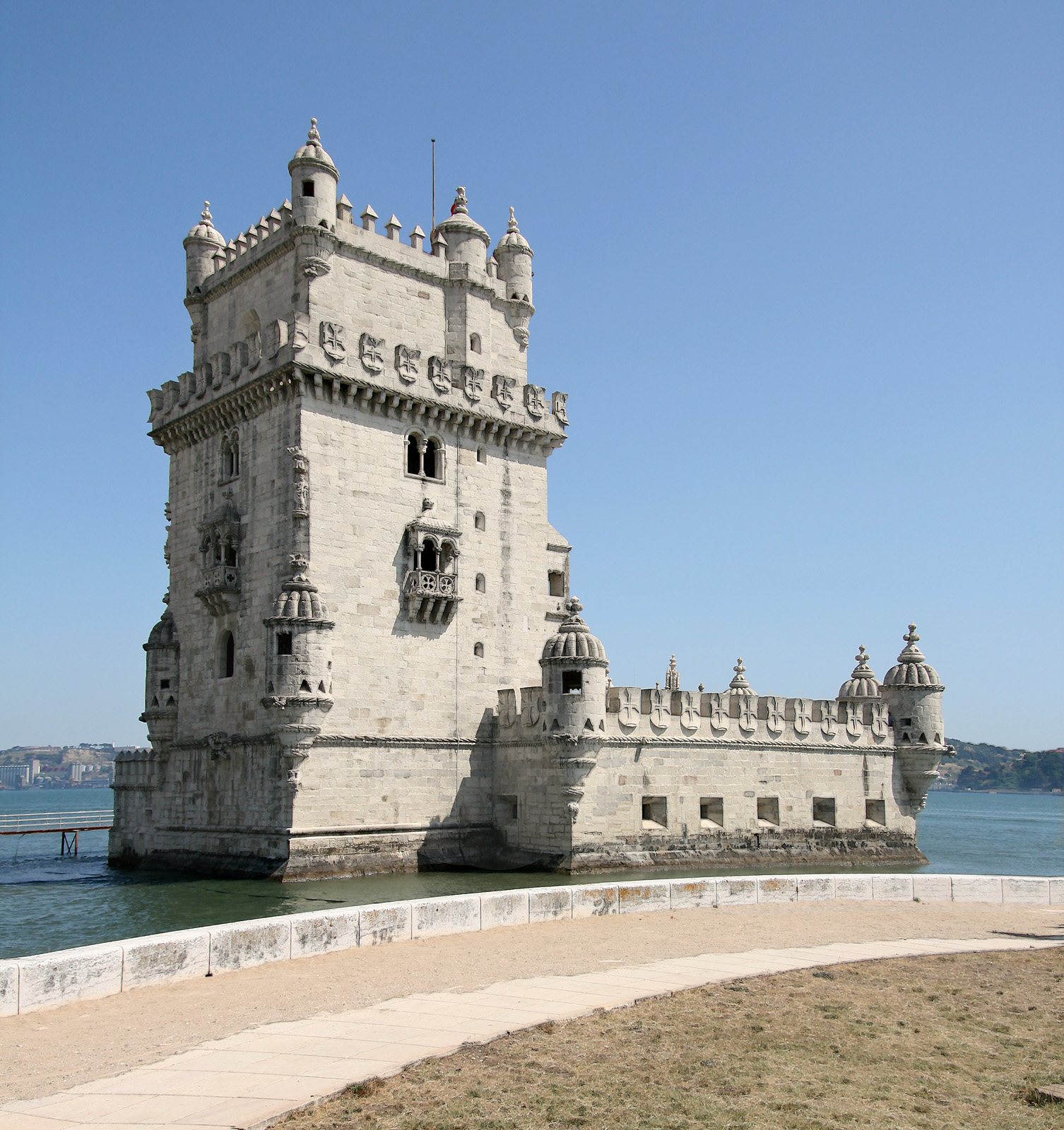
After arriving in Lisbon, teams visited the Belém Tower to perform a Fado song.

- Episode 7: "There's A Lot of Bones In This, I Really Don't Wanna Die" (8 September 2014)
- Prize: Two airline tickets to Abu Dhabi in the United Arab Emirates (awarded to Daniel & Ryan)

Locations

- Moscow (Orekhovo-Borisovo Metochion)
- Moscow → Lisbon, Portugal
- Lisbon (Belém Tower)
- Lisbon (Fábrica Sant'Anna → Largo das Portas do Sol)
- Lisbon (Rua de São Miguel & Beco do Pocinho or Calçadinha de São Miguel)
- Lisbon (Largo do Chafariz de Dentro)
- Cascais (Fisherman's Beach)
- Cascais (Restaurante a Económica)
- Sintra (Pena Palace)

Episode summary

- At the start of this leg, teams were instructed to fly to Lisbon, Portugal. Once there, teams had to travel to the Belém Tower, where had to correctly sing the Portuguese lyrics of the song "Fado do Cansaço" in sync with the music in order to receive their next clue from Cuca Roseta. Teams then had to travel by tram from Fábrica Sant'Anna to Largo das Portas do Sol in order to find their next clue.
- This leg's Detour was a choice between Wet or Dry. In Wet, teams had to travel to a section of the Lisbon streets celebrating the AgitÁgueda Art Festival, where thousands of umbrellas were hung above the streets, and count all of the yellow umbrellas. When teams wrote the correct answer on a chalkboard and presented it to a judge, they received their next clue. In Dry, teams had to find a group of women on the streets with laundry baskets that had their names attached. Teams then had to search among the washing lines above the nearby streets for the article of clothing with a tag naming their laundry lady in order to receive their next clue.
- After the Detour, teams had to travel to the Largo do Chafariz de Dentro in order to find their next clue, which directed them to drive to Fisherman's Beach in Cascais, where they found their next clue.
- In this leg's Roadblock, one team member had to carry a large fish, two kilograms (4.4 lb) of mussels and five kilograms (11 lb) of octopus across town to the Restaurante A Económica and then eat a traditional Portuguese fish stew called cataplana in order to receive their next clue directing them to the Pit Stop: Pena Palace in Sintra.

Additional notes

- Daniel & Ryan used their Salvage Pass to gain a one-hour time credit at the start of this leg.
- This was a non-elimination leg.

=== Leg 8 (Portugal → Croatia) ===
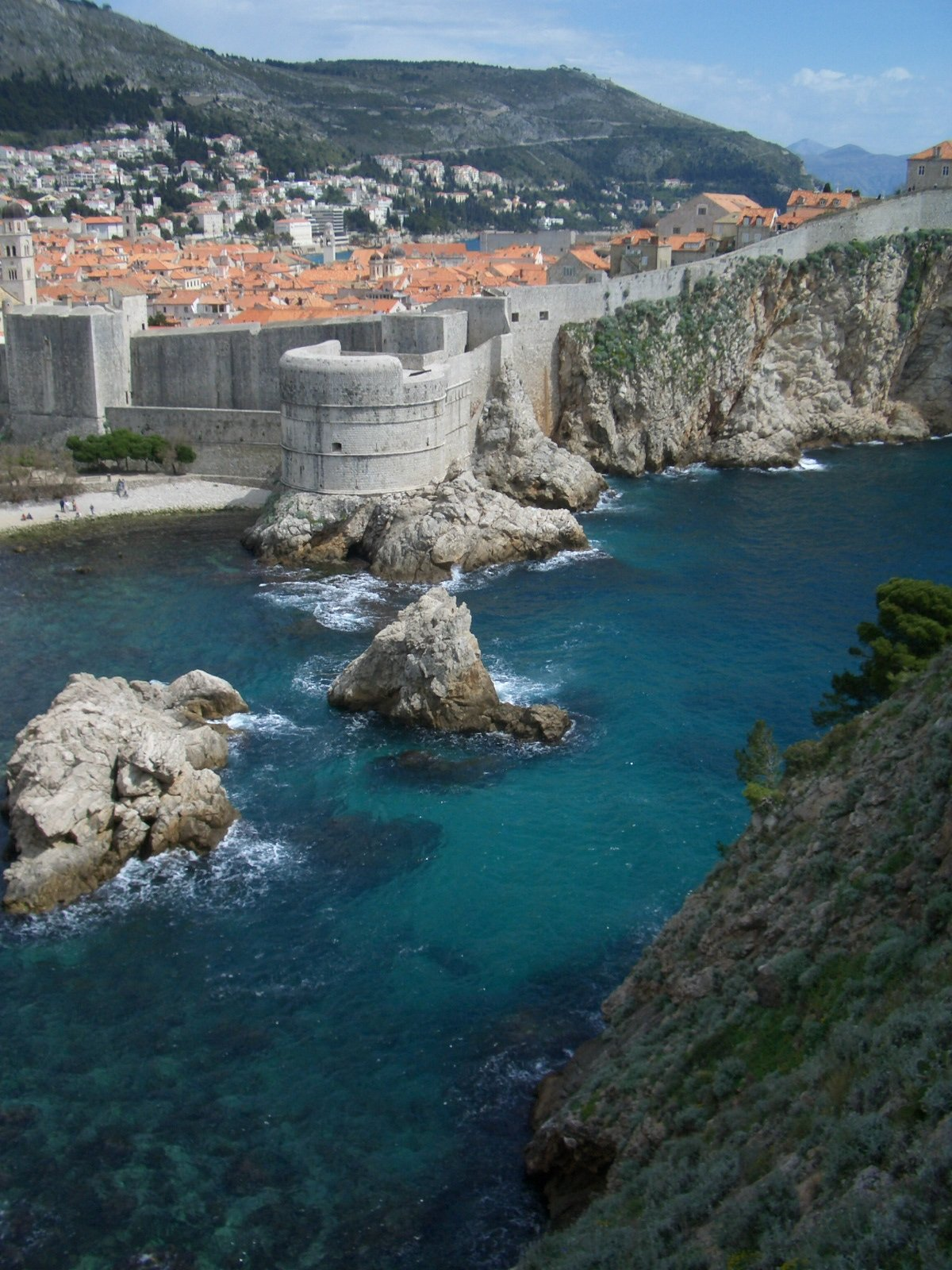
The Old Town of Dubrovnik in Croatia was highlighted during this leg, including Fort Bokar.

- Episode 8: "I Can't Feel My Nadz!" (15 September 2014)
- Prize: A A$10,000 voucher and a Platinum Velocity Frequent Flyer card (awarded to Sally & Tyson)
- Eliminated: Cat & Jesse

Locations

- Lisbon (Altis Grand Hotel)
- Lisbon → Dubrovnik, Croatia
- Dubrovnik (Ploča Gate & Minčeta Tower)
- Dubrovnik (Old Harbour)
- Dubrovnik (Dominican Monastery, Three Churches & Muški Frizerski Salon)
- Dubrovnik (Croata Necktie)
- Dubrovnik (Big Onofrio Fountain)
- Dubrovnik (Fort Bokar)
- Dubrovnik (Fort Saint John)
- Dubrovnik (Fort St. Lawrence)

Episode summary

- At the start of this leg, teams were instructed to fly to Dubrovnik, Croatia. Once there, teams had to travel to the Ploča Gate and carry two stones up to the Watchman's Keep atop Minčeta Tower. Once there, the city guard asked them, "How many stairs did you count to reach me?" If teams wrote the correct answer on a chalkboard, they received their next clue. Teams then had to travel to the Old Harbour and sign up for one of three departure times the next morning.
- In this season's only Fast Forward, one team had collect a prayer card from three different churches and then deliver them to Muški Frizerski Salon, where they had to get a tonsure haircut for men or a nun haircut for women. Daniel & Ryan won the Fast Forward.
- For their Speed Bump, Ashleigh & Jarrod each had to properly knot a necktie on the other before they could continue racing.
- Teams who did not elect to pursue the Fast Forward had to travel to the Big Onofrio Fountain, where they found their next clue.
- In this leg's first Roadblock, one team member had to abseil face-first down the side of Fort Bokar in order to receive their next clue.
- After the first Roadblock, teams had to walk along the city walls and search for their next clue near the south harbour wall of Fort Saint John.
- In this leg's second Roadblock, the team member who did not perform the previous Roadblock had to climb up Fort Saint John using an ascender in order to receive their next clue directing them to the Pit Stop: Fort St. Lawrence.

=== Leg 9 (Croatia → Argentina) ===
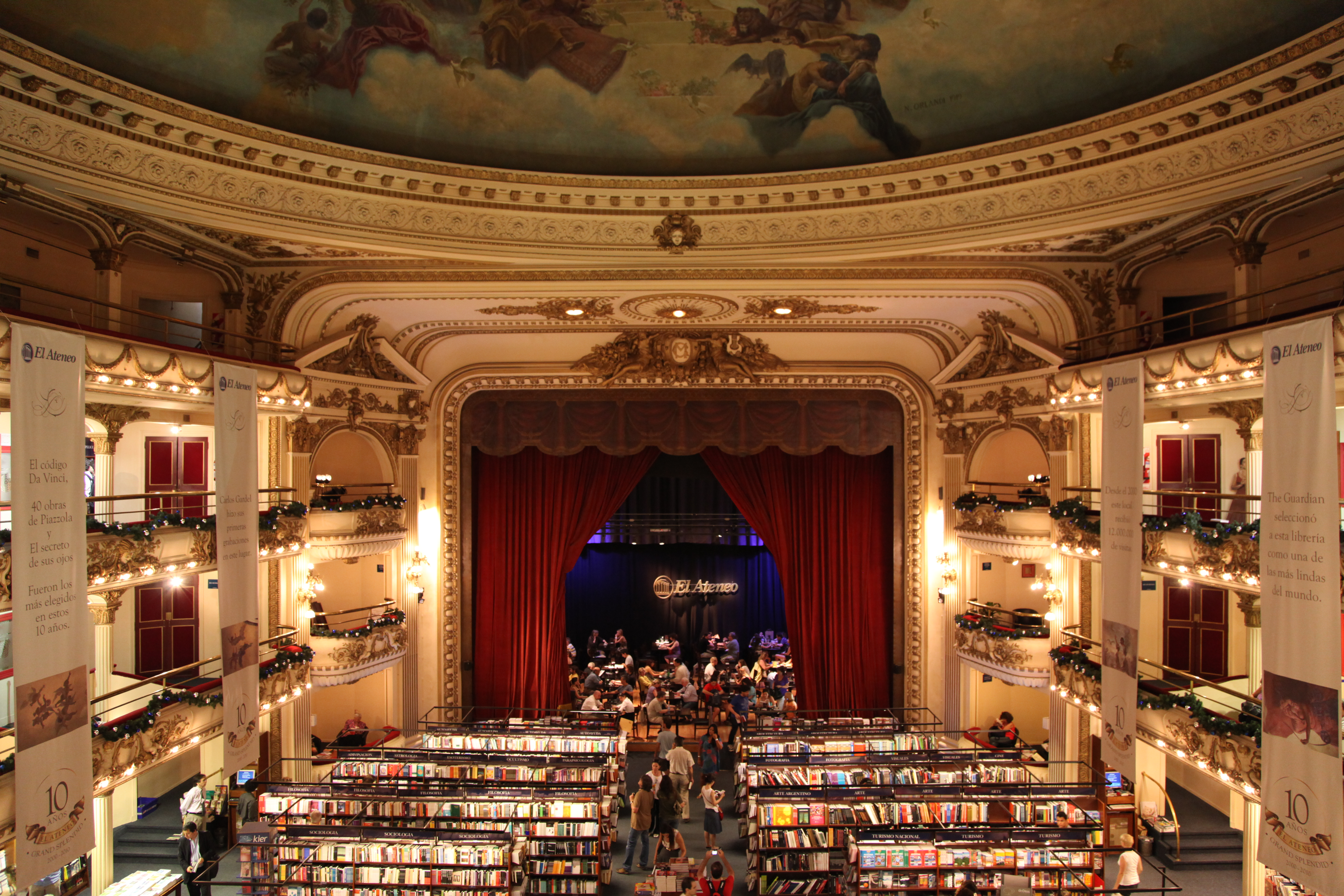
In Buenos Aires, teams visited El Ateneo Grand Splendid, a former theater that was turned into a bookstore.

- Episode 9: "Dude, We Don't Want To Go To Your House" (15 September 2014)
- Prize: A seven-night holiday for two to Bali, Indonesia (awarded to Ashleigh & Jarrod)
- Eliminated: Carla & Hereni

Locations

- Dubrovnik (Dubrovnik West Harbour)
- Dubrovnik → Buenos Aires, Argentina
- Luján (Estancia Las Bétulas)
- Buenos Aires (El Ateneo Grand Splendid)
- Buenos Aires (Pasaje de la Defensa or La Bombonera & La Recoleta Cemetery)
- Tigre (Argentina Rowing Club → Tigre Club)

Episode summary

- At the start of this leg, teams were instructed to fly to Buenos Aires, Argentina. Once there, teams had to travel to the Estancia Las Bétulas in Luján.
- In this leg's Roadblock, one team member had to navigate a sulky, a horse-drawn carriage, to a polo field, where they had to properly dress and saddle a polo horse for competition to receive their next clue.
- After the Roadblock, teams were instructed teams to find Buenos Aires's "most dramatic bookstore", which they had to figure out was the El Ateneo Grand Splendid, a converted theatre, where they found their next clue.
- This season's final Detour was a choice between Tango or Tribute. In Tango, teams had to search through Carlos Gardel's biography, Tangos Que Cantó Gardel, for a card directing them to Pasaje de la Defensa, where both team members had to perform a complex tango routine in order to receive their next clue. In Tribute, teams had to search Diego Maradona's biography, Cebollita Maradona, to find his home stadium La Bombonera, where a football player instructed them in Spanish, "Find in the book the hospital where Diego Maradona was born." Once teams found the answer in the book, teams were handed a picture of Eva Perón, which directed them to the site of her grave at La Recoleta Cemetery, where they found their next clue.
- After the Detour, teams had to travel to the Argentina Rowing Club in Tigre in order to find their next clue, which instructed them to row a rowboat to the Pit Stop at the Tigre Club.

=== Leg 10 (Argentina → United States → Australia) ===
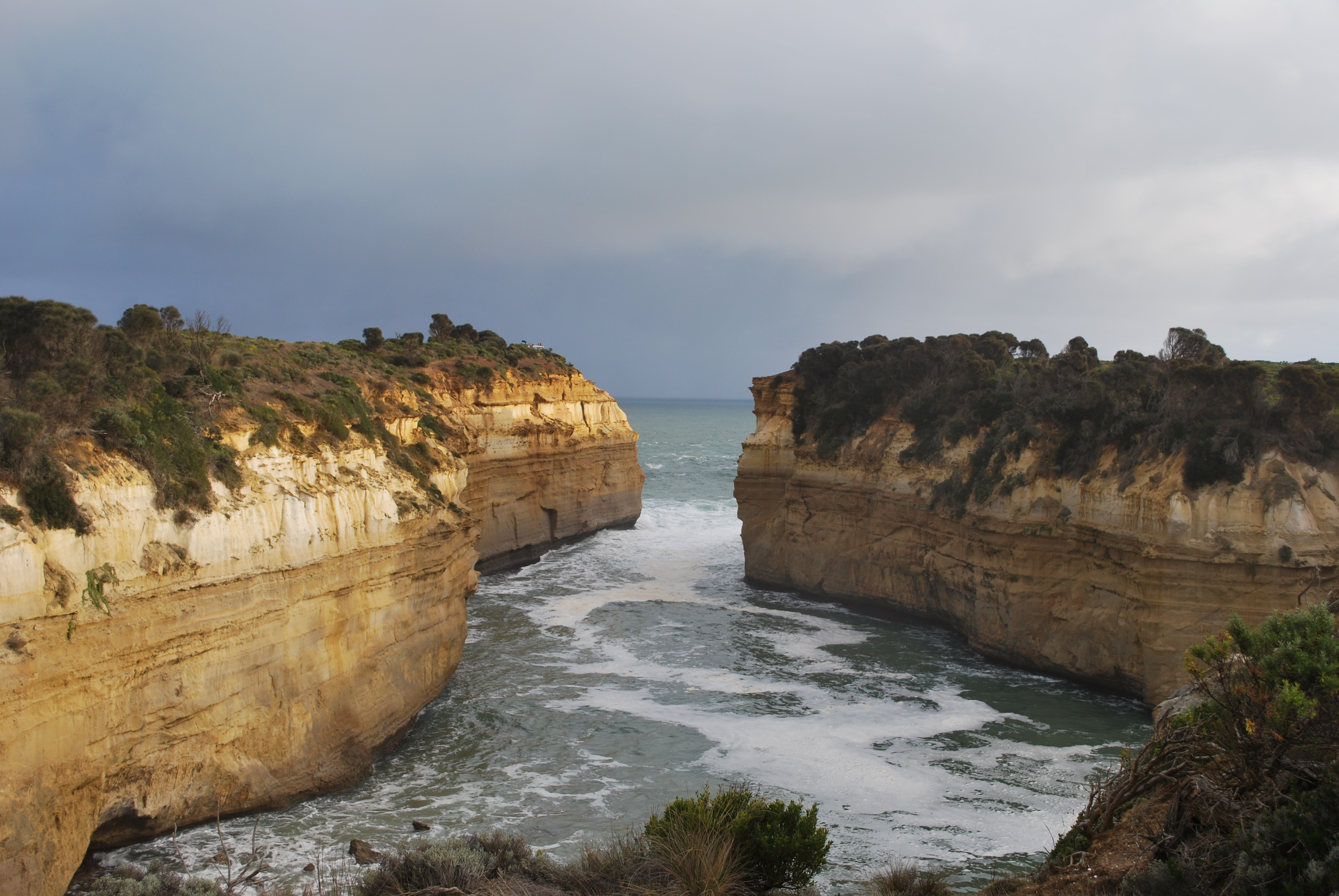
Loch Ard Gorge in Port Campbell National Park was the site of the final Roadblock and the finish line of The Amazing Race Australia v New Zealand.

- Episode 10: "At Least We Did Better Than the Bloody Kiwis" (25 September 2014)
- Prize: A$250,000
- Winners: Daniel & Ryan
- Runners-up: Sally & Tyson
- Third place: Ashleigh & Jarrod

Locations

- Buenos Aires (Puerto Madero)
- Buenos Aires → Los Angeles, United States (Los Angeles International Airport)
- Los Angeles (Hollywood Boulevard – Hollywood Walk of Fame & Ray's Photo Lab)
- Los Angeles (Pink's Hot Dogs)
- Los Angeles → Melbourne, Victoria
- Melbourne (Moorabbin Airport) → Great Otway National Park (Otway Fly Treetop Walk)
- Great Otway National Park (Otway Fly Treetop Walk) → Port Campbell (Great Ocean Road)
- Port Campbell (Port Campbell Jetty)
- Port Campbell (Port Campbell Beach)
- Port Campbell National Park (Loch Ard Gorge)
- Port Campbell National Park (Loch Ard Gorge – Mutton Bird Island Lookout)

Episode summary

- At the start of this leg, teams were instructed to fly to Los Angeles in the United States. Once there, teams had to search the airport parking lot for a marked car, which contained their next clue. Teams had to photograph themselves with three movie characters, who had been portrayed by Australian-born actors, on the Hollywood Walk of Fame. If their photographs were approved at Ray's Photo Lab, teams received their next clue, which directed them to Pink's Hot Dogs. There, both team members had to eat a traditional Pink's hot dog in order to receive their next clue, which instructed teams to fly to Melbourne, Victoria.
- Once in Melbourne, teams had to travel to the Moorabbin Airport, where they were instructed to fly by helicopter to the Great Otway National Park. Once there, they had search the Otway Fly Treetop Walk for their next clue located on a cantilever. Teams were instructed to begin an "Air, Land & Sea" task. Firstly, teams flew past the Twelve Apostles and had to search Port Campbell for a boat on land with the word LOCH on it. When they found the word, they landed on Great Ocean Road and had to find a local fisherman at Port Campbell Jetty, who gave them their next clue. Their second task was to find their second word ARD in a sandcastle on Port Campbell Beach. Lastly, they had to paddle out to a buoy in Port Campbell Bay and collect their third word, GORGE. After returning to shore, teams had to present all three words to a lifeguard in order to receive their next clue, which directed teams to combine the three words to form the location of their next clue: Loch Ard Gorge.
- In this season's final Roadblock, one team member had to find the nine items worn or held by the Pit Stop greeters from a vast array of items and place the items in the correct order that teams encountered them atop barrels in order to receive their final clue, which directed teams to the finish line at the Mutton Bird Island Lookout.

Leg	Country	Item
1	New Zealand	Gumboots
2	Cambodia	Golden leaves
3	Thailand	Coconut
4	Namibia	Bow
5	Russia	Ushanka
6	Russia	Auger
7	Portugal	Sword
8	Croatia	Red kerchief
9	Argentina	Polo mallet

Additional notes

- On the flight from Los Angeles to Melbourne, all teams were given a free upgrade to business class. Along the way, teams were given a challenge to name the locations on the Virgin Australia route map. Daniel & Ryan won two additional business class tickets to Los Angeles for winning this task.
- Sally & Tyson and Ashleigh & Jarrod received 1,000,000 Velocity Frequent Flyer points for finishing in second and third places.

== Ratings ==
=== Australian Ratings ===
All ratings data in Australia are taken from the five major metropolitan centres. Data from regional areas is not accounted for. Due to poor programming from Channel 7 there is no set time-slot, but the start time for the show was around 8:40 p.m. to 9:10 p.m. Times are taken from Electronic Programming Guides which still may not be accurate as to the real start time. Despite the lower ratings compared to the previous series, the show rated well in time shift, often being among the highest viewership gainers for the night.

#	Airdate	Timeslot	Overnight Viewers						7 Day Time-shift (Rank)	Ref
#	Airdate	Timeslot	Sydney	Melbourne	Brisbane	Adelaide	Perth	Total (Rank)	7 Day Time-shift (Rank)	Ref
1	4 August 2014	9:07 pm – 11:02 pm	191,000	149,000	107,000	60,000	82,000	588,000 (18)	734,000 (13)	
2	11 August 2014	8:47 pm – 10:08 pm	167,000	193,000	110,000	75,000	109,000	655,000 (17)	763,000 (12)	
3	18 August 2014	8:45 pm – 9:54 pm	—N/a	—N/a	—N/a	—N/a	—N/a	616,000 (<20)	754,000 (12)	
4/5	25 August 2014	8:49 pm – 11:03 pm	177,000	193,000	106,000	79,000	108,000	663,000 (18)	769,000 (14)	
6	1 September 2014	8:44 pm – 10:03 pm	154,000	179,000	116,000	74,000	112,000	635,000 (19)	731,000 (14)	
7	8 September 2014	8:54 pm – 10:08 pm	176,000	171,000	122,000	71,000	94,000	634,000 (19)	711,000 (15)	
8/9	15 September 2014	8:52 pm – 11:19 pm	155,000	206,000	128,000	72,000	96,000	656,000 (17)	768,000 (13)	
10	25 September 2014	9:03 pm – 10:27 pm	—N/a	—N/a	—N/a	—N/a	—N/a	416,000 (<20)	531,000 (20)	

=== New Zealand Ratings ===
#	Airdate	Timeslot	Viewers	7 Day Timeshift	Ref
1	5 August 2014	8:45 pm – 10:30 pm	260,620 (TV2); 25,410 (TV2+1)	+27,350	
2	12 August 2014	8:45 pm – 10:00 pm	250,390 (TV2)	+36,390	
3	19 August 2014	9:00 pm – 10:05 pm	267,890 (TV2)	+21,830	
4	26 August 2014	8:35 pm – 9:40 pm	267,800 (TV2); 25,510 (TV2+1)	+19,850	
5	2 September 2014	8:35 pm – 9:40 pm	245,300 (TV2)	+23,590	
6	9 September 2014	8:30 pm – 9:45 pm	235,990 (TV2); 30,340 (TV2+1)	+23,790	
7	16 September 2014	8:30 pm – 9:40 pm	183,920 (TV2); 23,480 (TV2+1)	+16,700	
8	23 September 2014	8:30 pm – 9:35 pm	191,930 (TV2)	+9,580	
9	30 September 2014	8:30 pm – 9:50 pm	226,860 (TV2)	+14,460	
10	7 October 2014	8:30 pm – 9:50 pm	202,900 (TV2)	+14,310	
