= Rowing Club Argentino =

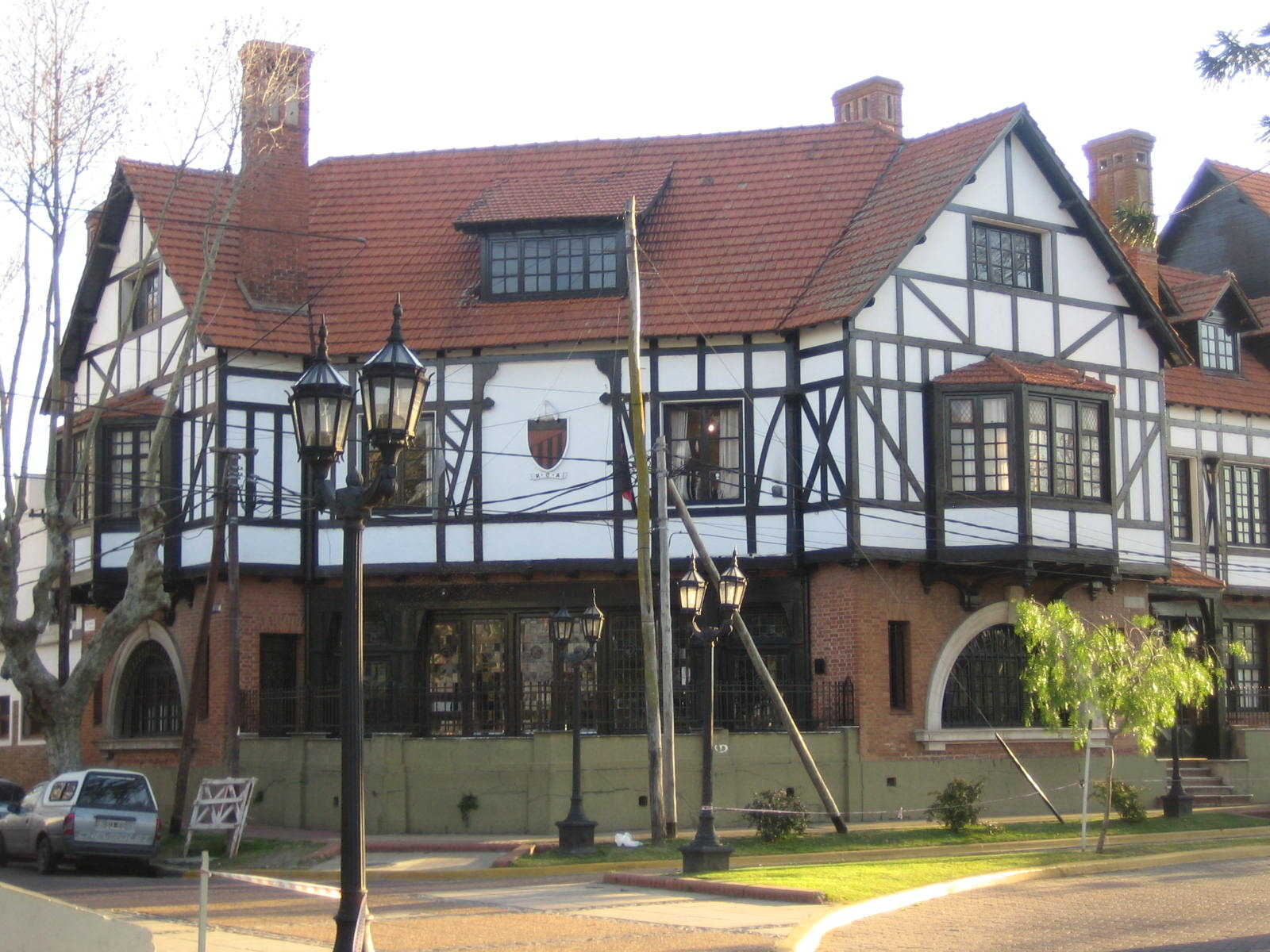

- Location: Paseo Victorica 316 - Tigre, Buenos Aires
- Home water: Tigre River
- Founded: April 14, 1905; 120 years ago
- Key people: Raúl Giménez (President)
- Website: rowingclubargentino.com.ar

Rowing Club Argentino is an Argentine rowing club sited in Tigre, Buenos Aires, 30-km distance from the Buenos Aires autonomous city. The institution –established in 1905– was one of the pioneers in the practise of the sport in Argentina.

== History ==
=== Background ===
Rowing was introduced in Argentina by British immigrants in the 1870s. A group of enthusiasts joined the port of Buenos Aires with Tigre (then named "Las Conchas") in about 3 hours. The first rowing clubs were Buenos Aires Rowing Club (established in 1873) and the Club de Regatas La Marina (1876), both located in the capital city while the first official regatta was held on December 8, 1873, with representatives from different countries taking part of it. President Domingo Sarmiento was one of the notable personalities that attended the event.

I am pleased with the celebration held today, even more than what you guess I am. I arrived as honorary member of this club to see the inauguration of a new style of fun in this country. It's very comforting for me –involved in the strict responsibilities of my position (as President of Argentina)– to come here and take part of these male sports that accomplish the ancient aphorism: "Mens sana in corpore sano"

— Domingo Sarmiento, from his speech during the first regatta held in Tigre, December 1873,

Despite being a difficult-to-access place, Tigre had optimal conditions to the practise of rowing. Because of that, the BARC members set a precarious box there to storage their boats to be used on weekends.

The practise of rowing spread with the establishment of a third club, Rosario Rowing Club (sited in the homonymous city) in Santa Fe Province, 1887.

The yellow fever epidemic on Buenos Aires and the development of the railway network in the country were two factors that substantially influenced rowing clubs originally established in Buenos Aires to set their locations in Tigre, where they soon moved.

Fifteen years after being formed, the British-origin members of BARC separated from the institution to form their own institution, Tigre Boat Club (the first of that district) in 1888. In December 1901, the Argentine Rowing Association ("Asociación Argentina de Remo") was founded, with the six clubs existing by then: Buenos Aires Rowing Club, Club de Regatas La Marina, Tigre Boat Club, Club de Remo Teutonia (founded by the German community), Campana Boat Club and Club de Regatas Bella Vista.

=== Consolidation ===
The institution was founded on April 14, 1905 in Buenos Aires. Founding members met at the Ernesto Tornquist office to establish a club that encouraged the practise of rowing. The members that attend the assembly were Henry M. Edye, Samuel Kay (son), Henry B. Elliot, Jorge F. Elliot, Ramón L. de Oliveira César, Martin E. Miguens, Ernesto C. Simons and Enrique Jorge. Four of them were members of Buenos Aires Rowing Club (the oldest rowing club of Argentina, founded in 1873) and the rest came from Tigre Boat Club.

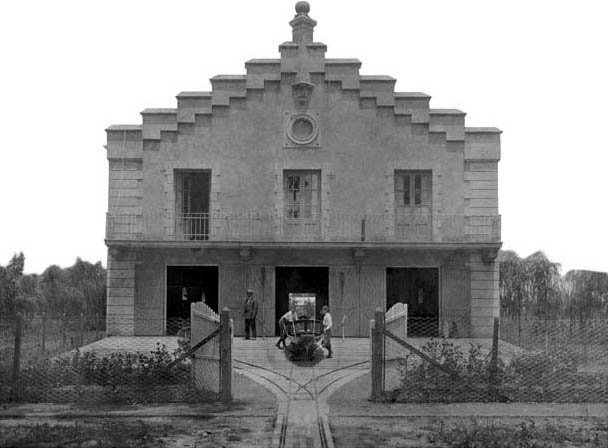
First RCA building, inaugurated in 1906

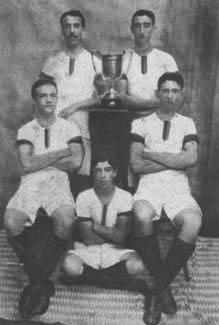
The team that won the first competition for the club in 1908

On September, the members committee approved the purchase of a 2,311 m2 land on the Luján River margins. The transaction had a cost of M$N 5,000, therefore the first building would be constructed there (with a cost of M$S 19,000). The money came from a loan and a mortgage. It was opened on May 6, 1906. The RCA had 201 members by then, that used the 11 boats and one racing shell.

The club debuted in the first official competition on November 11, 1908. Rowing Club Argentino achieved its first international trophies with two borrowed boats: the "Club de Regatas La Marina" and "Copa Mihanovich" competitions.

In 1910, Jorge Casares became president of the club, starting a period of 40 years managing the RCA. The second RCA building was opened in 1922, in the same place where the first seat had been constructed. The building was designed by architects Ezequiel Real de Azúa and Miguel Madero (selected through a competitive process which more than 30 professionals took part) at a cost of M$S 300,000.

The RAC was also the first rowing club to organise a long-distance regatta in Argentina, on June 1, 1930. The race runs on Luján River, Canal Arias and the mouth of Carapachay River on the Paraná de las Palmas, covering a distance of 25 km.

== Notable sportsmen ==
Some of the most remarkable athletes that have represented the RCA since its inception were:

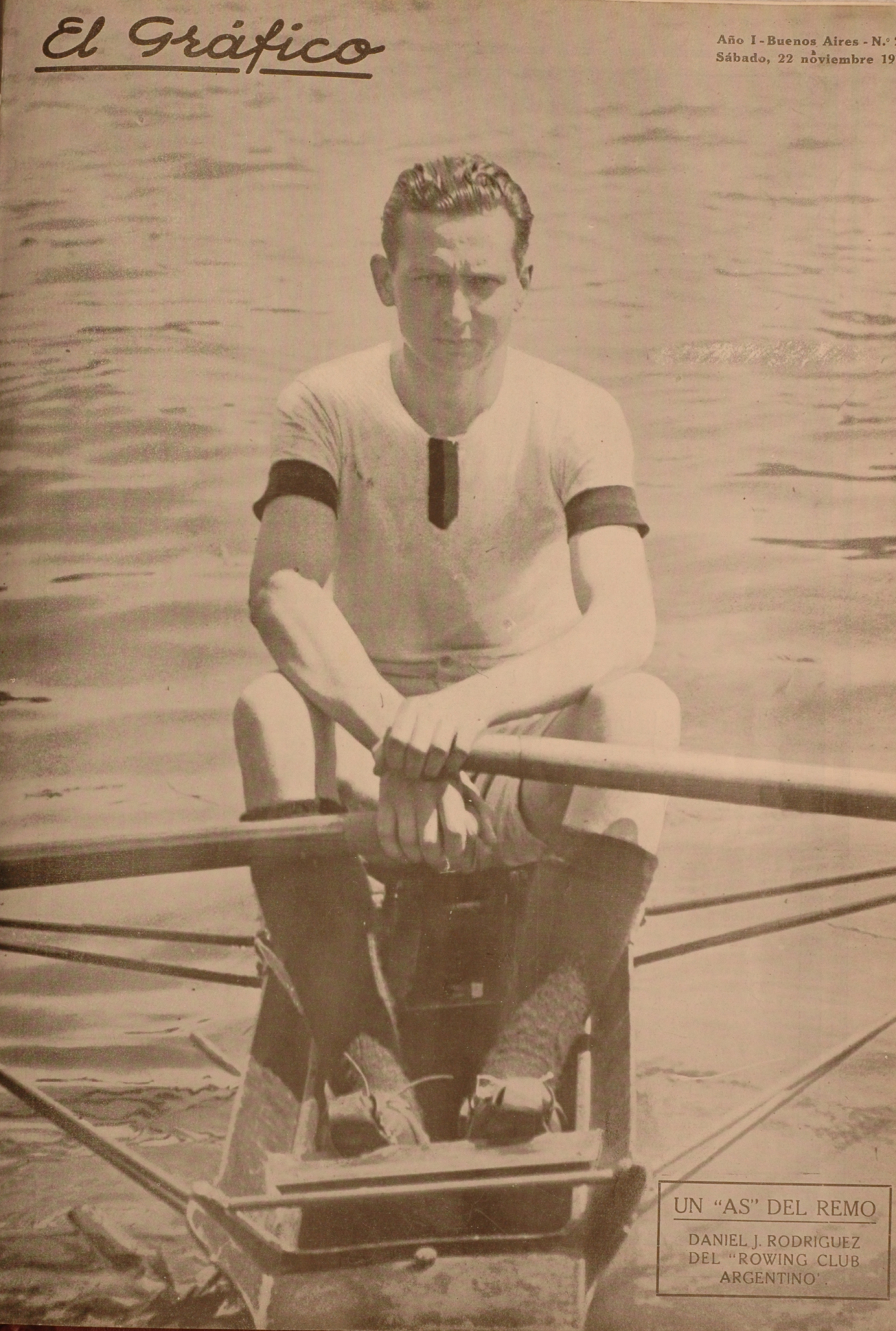
Daniel Rodríguez on the cover of El Gráfico, 1919

- Daniel J. Rodríguez (1909–1917)
- Rodolfo Rumbado (1909–1917)
- José Fabián Aranguren
- Carlos A. Siegrist
- Martín Urdaniz
- Francisco Charlin
- Carlos A. L. Conti Mattei
- L. Vernet Amadeo
- R. Gardey
- Ernesto Amadeo Carranza
- Alfredo Giménez Fynn
- César J. de Marzi
- José Luis Maino
- José M. de la Barrera
- Juan Behrensen (1925–29)
- Enrique M. Elliot
