= The Amazing Race Australia =

Australian adventure reality game show

- The general title card since season 4
- Also known as: The Amazing Race: Australia v New Zealand (3); The Amazing Race Australia: Celebrity Edition (7–9)
- Genre: Reality competition
- Created by: Elise Doganieri; Bertram van Munster
- Based on: The Amazing Race by: Bertram van Munster; Elise Doganieri
- Presented by: Grant Bowler; Beau Ryan; Scott Tweedie
- Starring: The Amazing Race Australia contestants
- Theme music composer: John M. Keane
- Country of origin: Australia
- Original language: English
- No. of seasons: 9
- No. of episodes: 127

Production
- Executive producers: Bertram van Munster; Michael McKay (2011–12); Trent Chapman (2011–12); Debbie Bryne (2014); Shannon McGinn (2014); Sophia Mogford (2019–22); Stephen Tate (2019); Cathie Scott (2021); Tim Ali (2022); Dave Emery (2022–2023); Lucy Connors (2023–2024); Emma Hanna (2024); Jane Rowley (2023–present); Alenka Henry (2019, 2025–present); Emily Commens (2025–present)
- Producers: Kylie Washington (2011); Ariel White (2011); Matthew Kowland (2012); David Gardner (2012–2014); John Tabbagh (2014); Karlene Meehnahan (2019–2022)
- Production location: See below
- Cinematography: Ryan Godard
- Camera setup: Multi-camera
- Running time: 47–68 minutes
- Production companies: activeTV (2011–12); Seven Productions (2014); Eureka Productions (2019–present); ABC Studios

Original release
- Network: Seven Network (2011–2014); TV2 (2014)
- Release: 16 May 2011 – 25 September 2014
- Network: Network 10
- Release: 28 October 2019 – present

Related
- International versions

The Amazing Race Australia is an Australian adventure reality competition show based on the American series The Amazing Race. Following the premise of other versions in the Amazing Race franchise, the show follows teams of two as they race around the world. Each season is divided into legs, with teams tasked with deducing clues, travelling by air, boat, car, taxi, and other modes of transportation, navigating unfamiliar locations, interacting with locals and completing physical and mental challenges. Teams are progressively eliminated at the end of most legs for being the last to arrive at designated Pit Stops. The first team to arrive at the Finish Line wins a grand prize of A$250,000.

The series was first aired on the Seven Network, who purchased the format rights to produce an Australian version in 2010 and (as of 2025) hold the Australian broadcast rights to the American version. The first two editions of the show aired in 2011 and 2012 were produced by activeTV, which also produced the Asian and Israeli versions of The Amazing Race, in association with ABC Studios. Following a hiatus in 2013, a third season titled The Amazing Race Australia v New Zealand, which included New Zealand teams, aired in 2014 and was produced in-house by the network's own Seven Productions. The show aired in New Zealand on TV2. The host for Seven's iteration the show was actor Grant Bowler. Seven's iteration of the show was not renewed for a fourth season.

In June 2019, it was announced that the series would be revived by Network 10. 10's iteration of the show is produced by Eureka Productions and hosted by former rugby league footballer Beau Ryan. The first edition of 10's iteration, and the fourth season overall, aired in late 2019. 10's second and the fifth season overall aired in 2021 and was set in Australia, following international travel restrictions due to the COVID-19 pandemic. 10's third and the sixth season overall aired in 2022 and returned to the regular global travel format. On 28 April 2023, the show was renewed for a seventh season - subtitled as "Celebrity Edition" and featuring celebrity contestants racing for a charity prize, with further Celebrity Editions airing in 2024 and 2025. The show was renewed for a fourth celebrity edition, and the tenth season overall for 2026. However, this was initially delayed to 2027. The series was notably absent from the network's upfronts for 2027 and is currently slated for a 2028 release.

== The race ==
The Amazing Race Australia is a reality television competition between teams of two in a race around the world. Each season is divided into a number of legs wherein teams travel and complete various tasks to obtain clues to help them progress to a Pit Stop where teams are given a chance to rest and recover before starting the next leg. The first team to arrive at a Pit Stop is often awarded a small prize while the last team is normally eliminated (except in non-elimination legs, where the last team to arrive may be penalised in the following leg). The final leg is run by the last three remaining teams, and the first to arrive at the final destination wins the A$250,000 cash prize (or an A$100,000 charity prize for the Celebrity Editions).

=== Teams ===
Each team is composed of two individuals who have some type of relationship to each other. A total of 202 participants have joined The Amazing Race Australia.

=== Route markers ===
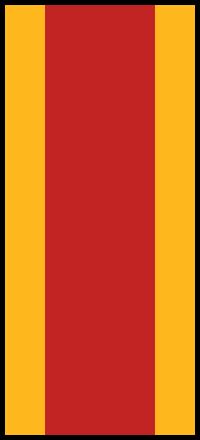
A standard Route Marker looks like this.

Route Markers are yellow and red flags that mark the places where teams must go. Most Route Markers are attached to the boxes that contain clue envelopes, but some may mark the place where the teams must go in order to complete tasks, or may be used to line a course that the teams must follow.

Route markers were, however, coloured yellow and green in the second leg of the inaugural season to avoid confusion with the flag of South Vietnam. The route markers were not changed for a visit to Vietnam during the 4th season.

=== Clues ===
Clues are found throughout the competition in sealed envelopes, normally inside clue boxes. They give teams the information they need and tasks they need to do in order for them to progress.

- Route Info: A general clue that may include a task to be completed by the team before they can receive their next clue.
- Detour: A choice between two tasks. Teams are free to choose either task or swap tasks if they find one option too difficult.
- Roadblock: A task only one team member can complete. Teams must choose which member will complete the task based on a brief clue about the task before fully revealing the details of the task.
- Fast Forward: A task that only one team may complete, allowing that team to skip all remaining tasks and head directly for the next Pit Stop. Teams may only claim one Fast Forward during the entire season.

=== Obstacles ===
During the race, teams may face the following which may potentially slow them down:

- Intersection: When encountered, two teams have to mutually agree to team up and complete tasks together until they receive a clue indicating that they are no longer Intersected.
- Yield: At this obstacle, which was only seen in season two to date, one team can force another trailing team to wait a pre-determined amount of time before they could continue racing.
- U-Turn: At this obstacle located after a Detour, one team can force another trailing team to return and complete the other option of the Detour they did not select.
  - Season 2 & season 4, featured a variation called the "U-Turn Vote", having all teams voting at the start of the leg for whom they wish to receive the U-turn. The team with the most votes would be U-Turned sometime during the leg.
  - Also, an "Anonymous U-Turn" is where a team may U-Turn another trailing team without having to reveal themselves.
- Stowaway Teams: Introduced on the fifth season, at random intervals, new teams would be introduced to the race at the start of the leg.
- T-Junction is similar to an Intersection, but with all remaining teams split up into two larger super-teams together for the rest of the leg. The first team to arrive at the T-Junction would create both super-teams. The second super-team to arrive at the Pit Stop would then have to choose one team from the group to eliminate. The T-Junction was intended to be introduced in the 5th season.
  - A version of the T-Junction was featured on The Amazing Race Australia v New Zealand called a "Nation vs Nation" challenges – which featured teams up with other teams from their country in a challenge against teams from the other country.
- Face-Off: An obstacle in which teams, two at a time, compete against each other in a specific challenge. The winning teams are gradually given the next clue, while the losing team must face off against the next team to arrive at the Face-Off. The team that loses the final Face-Off must wait out a 5-minute penalty before receiving the next clue. This was introduced in season nine.

=== Legs ===
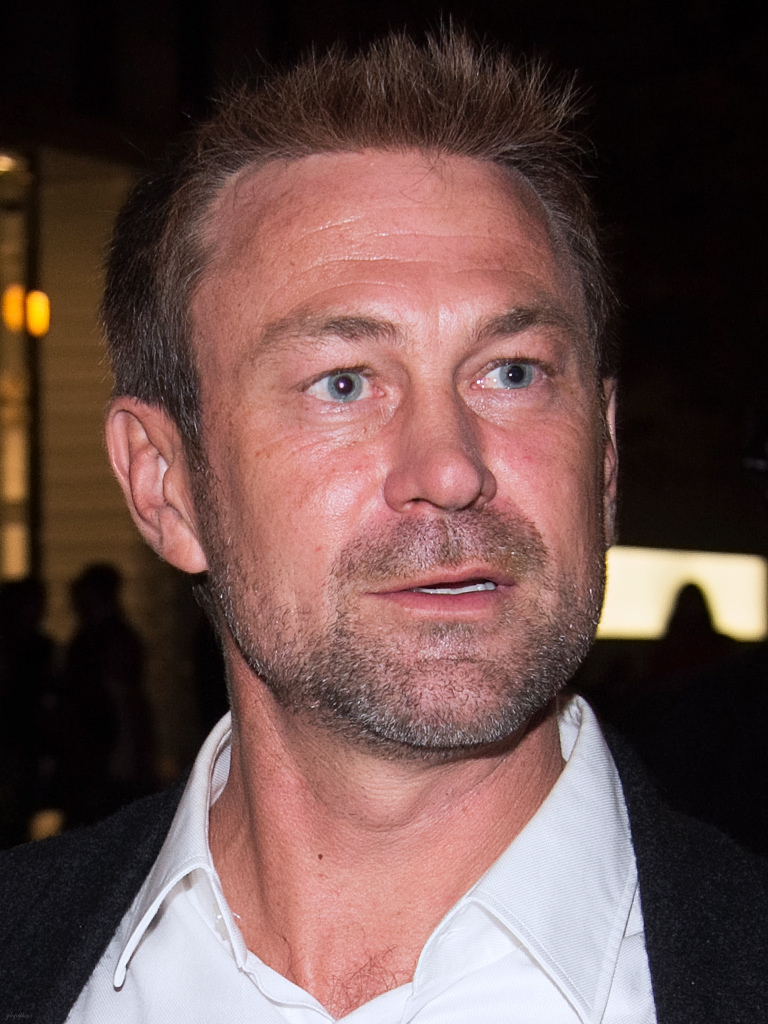
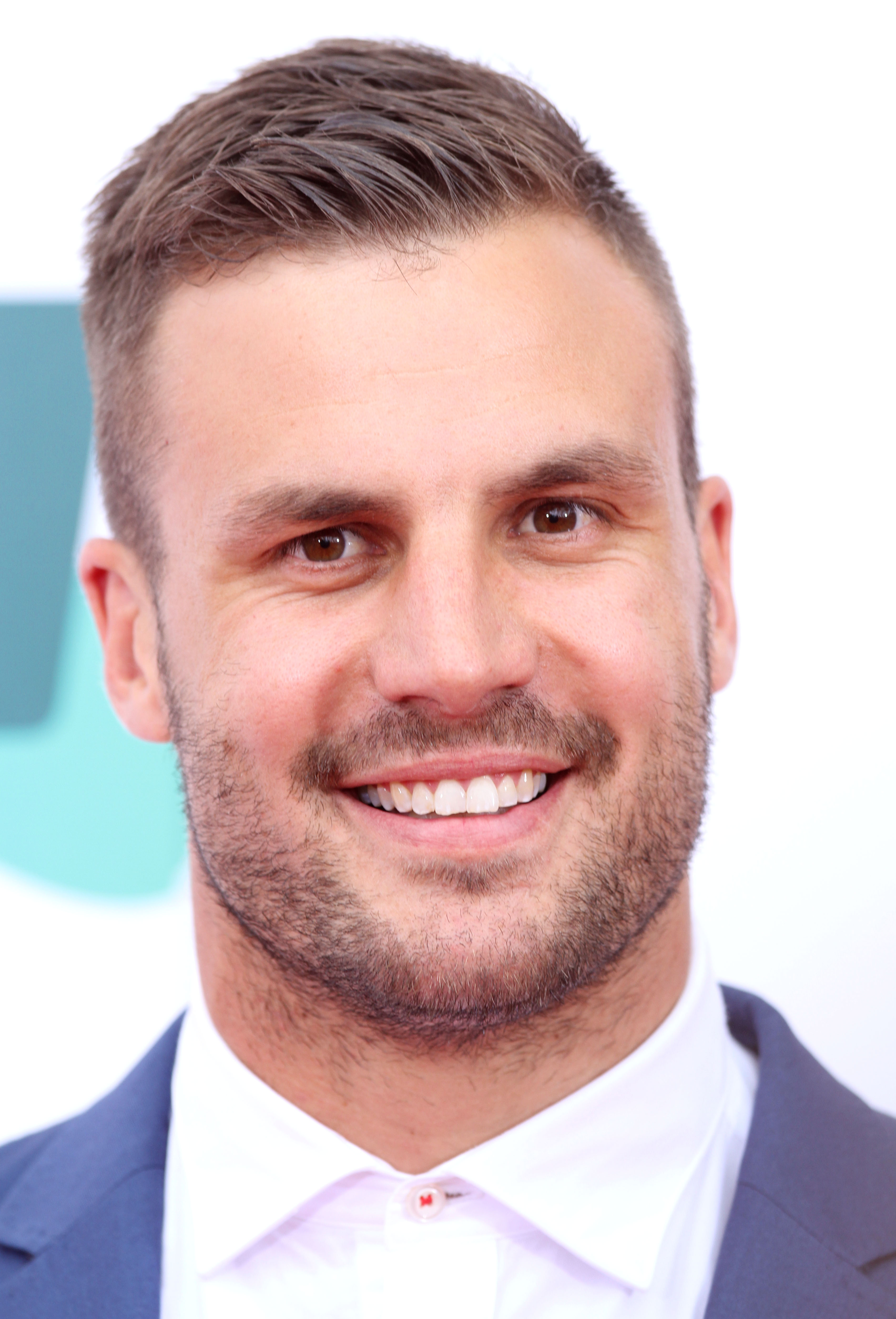
Hosts Grant Bowler, Beau Ryan and Scott Tweedie

At the beginning of each leg, teams receive an allowance of cash, typically in Australian dollars, to cover expenses during the competition (except for the purchase of airline tickets, which are paid for by credit cards provided by the show).

Teams then have to follow clues and Route Markers that will lead them to the various destinations and tasks they will face. Modes of travel between these destinations include commercial and chartered aeroplanes, boats, trains, taxis, buses, and rented vehicles provided by the show, or the teams may simply travel by foot. Each leg ends with a Pit Stop where teams are able to rest and where teams that arrives last are progressively eliminated until only three teams remain. Most legs comprise three or more challenges, often a Roadblock, Detour and a Route Info task. The first teams to arrive at the Pit Stop win prizes, usually from the show's sponsors.

==== Gameplay prizes ====
Occasionally, the first arriving team will win an advantage in the game.

- The Express Pass: Introduced in season 1, the pass allows the holders to skip any task they want.
  - The Australia v New Zealand edition introduced a twist to the Express Pass, where the team that won the first leg won one pass for themselves and a second for another team.
- The Salvage Pass: Introduced in season 2, The pass allows that team to either save the last team to arrive the current leg from elimination or gain a 1-hour time credit for the next leg.
- The First Class Pass: Introduced in season 5, the pass allows the holder to skip the entire next leg of the race, during which they will enjoy a special reward experience. The pass is awarded to the first placing team on a non-elimination leg. Additionally, the holder will allocate a The Salvage and The Sabotage to the Bottom Two teams (see non-elimination legs).

==== Non-elimination legs ====
Each season has a number of predetermined non-elimination legs, in which the last team to arrive at the Pit Stop is not eliminated and is allowed to continue on the competition. However, that team is penalised for the next leg

- Marked for Elimination: On seasons 1 and 2, the penalised teams were tasked to arrive first to the next Pit-Stop, or otherwise face an automatically 30-minute time penalty upon arrival at that Pit Stop.
- Speed Bump: Two iterations of the Speed Bump exist on the Australian version
  - On seasons 3, 7, 8, and 9 the Speed Bump is an additional task that the penalised team must complete before they receive their clue and continue racing. This resembles the Speed Bump used on most seasons of most versions of the show. Since season 8, it is also an additional task for the penalised team that finished last on some Marathon legs.
  - On season 4, the Speed Bump added an additional aspect to the first task of the following leg, making it more difficult for the penalised team. This version of the Speed Bump resembled the Handicap penalty used on The Amazing Race Norge. This Speed Bump variation was also used on the 27th American season in that season's sole Speed Bump. This iteration of the Speed Bump returned in season 6 as the penalty for teams returning from COVID isolation, as well as for a single Speed Bump in season 7.
- On season 5, the leg winners delegate two between the bottom two teams a Salvage (to assist the team), and a Sabotage (to penalise the team).
  - The Salvage is an advantage given to the receiving team to help them on the next leg. For example, the team may receive a personal driver for the next leg, they may get extra money, or they may be allowed to know the full details of the Roadblock challenge is before they choose who attempts it.
  - The Sabotage is a penalty given to the receiving team. For example, the team may need to complete the leg with one of the team members blindfolded or tied together, they may lose all their money, or they may even have to do it barefoot.
- On season 6, there was no non-elimination penalty.

==== Marathon legs ====
Marathon legs occur when teams are instructed to go to the next Pit Stop but actually must continue racing without a mandatory rest period. It occurred once every season for Seven's iteration of the series. This was later brought into Network 10's second season, and has occurred regularly.

=== Rules and penalties ===
==== Rules ====
- For season 1, both team members could perform a maximum of six Roadblocks. It is assumed that a similar rule was used for season 2 but there were several Roadblocks that went unaired. The slightly shorter 3rd season featured the rule with a 5-5 Roadblock split with the 11th and final Roadblock being open to either teammate. The 4th season did not feature such a Roadblock rule.
- Unless otherwise stated, such as during Roadblocks, team members must stay within six meters of each other and stay close to their assigned camera and sound crew.

==== Penalties ====
Most penalties are adapted from the American version but sometimes the show will use its own rules. The rules may vary between seasons of the show. Given the large difference in rules between the original Seven Network iterations (seasons 1–3) and the Network 10 iteration (season 4–present), the rules for both iterations are listed separately.

First iteration

- If a team fails to complete a Roadblock, Detour or Speed Bump they receive a 4-hour penalty.
- If a team fails to complete an Intersection task, they receive a 2- or 4-hour penalty. This occurred to Anastasia & Chris and Sam & Renee of the 2011 edition. It is not stated but assumed that the larger penalty is given to the team that elects to quit with the smaller penalty was given to the team forced to quit due to their intersected team quitting.
- If a team hitchhikes or travels in privately owned vehicles, they receive a 20-minute penalty. This occurred to Sam & Renae and Tyler & Nathan of season 1.
- If a team fails to take a particular type of transport or travel class, they receive a 10-minute penalty (which is a 30-minute penalty in the American version). This occurred to Jeff & Luke of season 1 who travelled on a second-class train carriage when told to travel on a third-class carriage.
- If a team sells their own items in order to raise money, they receive a 30-minute penalty (which is a two-hour penalty in the American version). This occurred to Adam & Dane of season 2.
- If a team pulls another team's belongings out of their taxi, they receive a 2-hour penalty. This occurred to Joseph & Grace of season 2.

Second iteration

- If a team, in a leg where they're required to drive themselves, goes over a speed limit, they will occur a one-hour penalty. This occurred to Sid & Ash on season 4. The equivalent penalty on the American show is 30 minutes and any time deemed to have been gained from the speeding.
- If a team fails to complete a task, they receive a 30-minute penalty. This occurred to Jobelle & Rani and Dwes & Katherine of season 5.
- If a team hitchhikes or travels in privately owned vehicles, they receive a 10-minute penalty in season 5.
- If a team fails to complete an Intersection task, they receive a 1-hour penalty. This occurred to George & Pam and Bec & Kate of season 7.

== Series overview ==
The first season premiered in May 2011 and ended in August 2011. The second season premiered in May 2012 and ended in August 2012. The casting for a third season began in August 2012, however, it was notably absent when the network revealed its 2013 schedule in October. A 2013 edition of the show was replaced by an unsuccessful revival of The Mole. A new edition was launched in August 2014, involving teams from New Zealand and titled The Amazing Race Australia v New Zealand.

In May 2019, a casting call for a new "Adventure Travel Competition" led to speculation that The Amazing Race Australia was being revived. At the time, the only information known about the series was that it would be produced by Eureka Productions and that, like the Australia v New Zealand edition, applications were open to Australian and New Zealand citizens and permanent residents. In late May, it was reported by blog TVBlackbox that the casting call was indeed for an Amazing Race Australia revival with Network 10 commissioning the reboot. In late June, Network 10 announced the revival of The Amazing Race Australia with a new season set to air in late 2019.

| No. (Note: In referencing the series, Network 10 only account for their seasons in season count – discounting the earlier Seven Network iteration of the series. By 10's season count, the 2019 season would be the 1st season. However, Wikipedia will account for all iterations as one continuous series—making the 2019 season the 4th season.) | Race Information | | | | | | | | Results | | Host | Additional Notes |
| No. | Start date | Starting Line | Finish Date | Finish Line | Distance | Countries | Legs | Teams | Winners | Prize | Host | Additional Notes |
Seven Network Iteration (2011–2014)
| 1 | 5 November 2010 | Melbourne Cricket Ground, Melbourne, VIC | 29 November 2010 | Heirisson Island, Perth, WA | 50,000 km (31,000 mi) | 11 | 12 | 11 | Tyler Atkins & Nathan Joliffe | $A250,000 | Grant Bowler | |
| 2 | 18 November 2011 | Royal Botanic Gardens, Sydney, NSW | 13 December 2011 | Lake McKenzie, Fraser Island, QLD | 65,000 km (40,000 mi) | 9 | 12 | 11 | Shane Haw & Andrew Thoday | $A250,000 | Grant Bowler | Introduced Anonymous U-Turn, Yield, U-Turn Vote, and Salvage Pass |
| 3 | 7 March 2014 | Uluru, Uluṟu-Kata Tjuṯa; National Park, NT | 30 March 2014 | Loch Ard Gorge, Port Campbell; National Park, VIC | 90,000 km (56,000 mi) | 10 | 10 | 10 | Daniel Little & Ryan Thomas | $A250,000 | Grant Bowler | Australia v New Zealand; Featured 5 teams from Australia & 5 from New Zealand; Introduced the Speed Bump penalty and second Express Pass |
Network 10 Iteration (2019–present)
| 4 | 20 August 2019 | Seoul Plaza, Seoul, South Korea | 12 September 2019 | Nitmiluk Gorge, Nitmiluk National Park, NT | 45,000 km (28,000 mi) | 8 | 12 | 11 | Tim & Rod; Sattler-Jones | $A250,000 | Beau Ryan | First season to start outside Australia |
| 5 | 6 October 2020 | Newell Beach, Newell, QLD | 14 November 2020 | Mount Kosciuszko, Kosciuszko National Park, NSW | 17,000 km (11,000 mi) | 1 | 24 | 16 (Note: 14 teams began the season, with 2 additional teams being introduced mid-way through the race.) | Brendon Crawley & Jackson Dening | $A250,000 | Beau Ryan | Season set entirely within Australia (due to COVID-19). Introduced the First Class Pass and Stowaway Teams. (Note: A new game mechanic titled the T-Junction was intended to be introduced this season but ultimately did not do so.) |
| 6 | 5 March 2022 | Flemington Racecourse, Melbourne, VIC & Hickson Road Reserve, Sydney, NSW (Note: 10 teams started the season in Melbourne while 10 teams started in Sydney.) | 16 April 2022 | Gantheaume Point, Broome, WA | 55,000 km (35,000 mi) | 7 | 21 | 20 | Heath Curry & Toni Hilland | $A250,000 & 2 Isuzu cars | Beau Ryan; Scott Tweedie (Note: Scott Tweedie guest hosted the show for four episodes while Beau Ryan was in COVID-19 isolation.) | Introduced the split Starting Line. |
| 7 | 8 June 2023 | Sunder Nursery, Delhi, India | 2 July 2023 | The River of Life Lookout, Kuala Lumpur, Malaysia | 10,000 km (6,200 mi) | 3 | 12 | 11 | Darren McMullen & Tristan Dougan, Emma & Hayley Watkins, Ali & Angie Simpson (Note: The Final 3 teams agreed to a joint victory to split the charity grand prize for each team's charity. The teams are ordered based on their arrival at the site of the Finish Line, before they agreed to step on the Finish Mat together.) | A$100,000 (for Charity) | Beau Ryan | Featured celebrities & their loved ones. First season to feature a finish line outside Australia |
| 8 | 7 May 2024 | Plaza de Mayo; Buenos Aires, Argentina | 1 June 2024 | Hua Lamphong Railway Station; Bangkok, Thailand | 25,000 km (15,500 mi) | 4 | 12 | 11 | Tai "Bam Bam" & Logan Tuivasa | A$100,000 (for Charity) | Beau Ryan | Featured celebrities racing with their loved ones. |
| 9 | 18 March 2025 | Shanti Stupa; Pokhara, Nepal | 14 April 2025 | Sumberwatu Heritage Resort; Sambirejo, Indonesia | 24,000 km (15,000 mi) | 5 | 15 | 13 | Stephen & Bernard Curry | A$100,000 (for Charity) | Beau Ryan | Featured celebrities racing with their loved ones. Introduced the Face Off |
| 10 | | | | | | | | | | A$100,000 (for Charity) | Beau Ryan | Featured celebrities racing with their loved ones. |

== Broadcast details and ratings ==
| No. | Network | Episodes | Timeslot | Premiere | | | Finale | | | Viewers | Average Rank | Ref |
| No. | Network | Episodes | Timeslot | Date | Viewers | Rank | Date | Viewers | Rank | Viewers | Average Rank | Ref |
|---|---|---|---|---|---|---|---|---|---|---|---|---|
| 1 | Seven | 12 | Monday 8:30 p.m. | 16 May 2011 | 1,258,000 | #5 | 1 August 2011 | 1,195,000 | #6 | 1,125,000 | #7 | |
| 2 | Seven | 12 | Wednesday 9:00 p.m. (Note: The first four episodes aired on Wednesdays at 9:00 p.m. Starting with the Episode 5, the regular timeslot was Mondays at 7:30 p.m.) (Note: Episode 3 aired in ACT, QLD and NSW at the special time of Thursday 9:00 p.m. to avoid clashing with Game 2 of the 2012 State of Origin series.); Monday 7:30 p.m. (Note: No episodes aired between 30 July and 6 August to avoid clashing with the 2012 Summer Olympics.) (Note: Episodes 11 & 12 aired on Tuesday & Wednesday 7:30 p.m. as a part of 'Finale Week', in which the Final 3 episodes aired on 3 consecutive nights.) | 30 May 2012 | 886,000 | #10 | 15 August 2012 | 976,000 | #8 | 905,000 | #10 | |
| 3 | Seven (AU); TV2 (NZ) | 10 | Monday 8:40 p.m. (AU) (Note: Episode 1 aired at 9:10 p.m. due to an extended edition of The X Factor) (Note: On two occasions, a double episode aired in Australia. These occurred on 25 August (Episodes 4 & 5) and the 15 September (Episodes 8 & 9), with the first airing at the regular time, and the second airing immediately after the first. New Zealand did not air such double episodes.) (Note: Episode 10 aired at 9:00 p.m. on Thursday.); Tuesday 8:30 p.m. (NZ) | 4 August 2014 (AU); 5 August 2014 (NZ) | 588,000 | #18 | 25 September 2014 (AU); 7 October 2014 (NZ) | 416,000 | #<20 | 607,000 | #16 | |
| 4 | 10 | 12 | Monday & Tuesday 7:30 p.m. | 28 October 2019 | 716,000 | #8 | 3 December 2019 | 670,000 (Note: The final episode was coded into two programs – "Grand Finale" and "The Finish Line". Because of this, two separate sets of ratings were produced.); 805,000 | #7 #3 | 682,000 | #7 | |
| 5 | 10 | 24 | Sunday, Monday & Tuesday 7:30 p.m. (Note: During the premiere week, the first three episodes aired on Monday, Tuesday & Wednesday.) | 1 February 2021 | 596,000 | #11 | 28 March 2021 | 656,000; 752,000 | #7 #6 | 584,000 | #9 | |
| 6 | 10 | 21 | Sunday, Monday & Tuesday 7:30 p.m. | 29 August 2022 | 841,000 | #13 | 9 October 2022 | 628,000; 744,000 | #12 #9 | 622,000 | #13 | |
| 7 | 10 | 12 | Wednesday & Thursday 7:30 p.m. | 4 October 2023 | 909,000 | #7 | 9 November 2023 | 763,000; 833,000 | #9 #7 | 749,000 | #10 | |
| 8 (Note: In 2024, the OzTAM system by which Television ratings are recorded changed, with the rank now determined by a program's reach (viewers nationally who watch a minute of a program) rather than by average viewership over the length of the program. Both Reach and Average viewership are recorded. For consistency, the average viewership is used in this table.) | 10 | 12 | Sunday 7:00pm & Monday 7:30pm (Note: During the premiere week, the first two episodes aired on Monday & Tuesday at 7:30pm.) | 9 September 2024 | 979,000 | #5 | 20 October 2024 | 763,000 | #9 | 762,000 | #9 | |
| 9 | 10 | 15 | Sunday 7:00pm & Monday 7:30pm (Note: During the premiere week, the first three episodes aired on Monday, Tuesday & Wednesday at 7:30pm.) | 8 September 2025 | 1,009,000 | #6 | 20 October 2025 | 868,000 | #11 | 814,000 | #9 | |

== Countries and locales visited ==
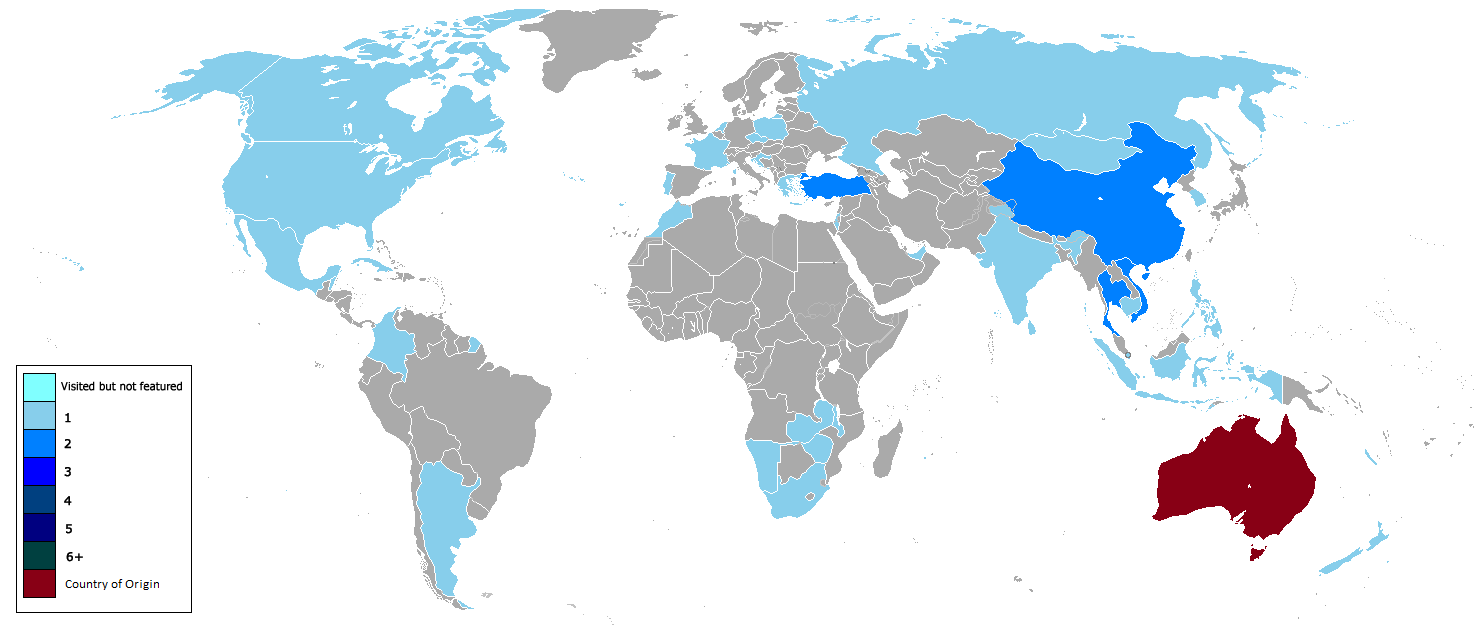
Countries that The Amazing Race Australia has visited are shown in colour.

As of 2025, The Amazing Race Australia has visited 41 countries and all 6 inhabited continents. (Note: This count only includes countries that fielded actual route markers, challenges or finish mats. Airport stopovers are not counted or listed.)

Most routes in The Amazing Race Australia travelled across the globe, starting from one Australian location and ending in another. There are several exceptions:

- Season four began in Seoul, South Korea.
- Season five travelled entirely within Australia, due to travel restrictions resulting from the COVID-19 pandemic.
- Season six started in bi-cities of Sydney and Melbourne within two sections of groups of 10 teams, once all groups completed in separate legs, they were joined on the third leg in Morocco.
- Season seven began in Delhi, India and only travelled in Asia, ending in Kuala Lumpur, Malaysia.
- Season eight began in Buenos Aires, Argentina and ended in Bangkok, Thailand.
- Season nine began in Pokhara, Nepal and, similar to season seven, only travelled in Asia, ending in Sambirejo, Indonesia.

=== Oceania ===
| Rank | Country | Season(s) visited | Pit Stops |
|---|---|---|---|
| 1 | Australia | 6 (1–6) (Note: The entirety of Season 5 was held in Australia) | 29 (Note: Includes 6 Finish Lines)^{,} (Note: See the Australia section for details regarding visits to each state and territory) |
| 2 | New Zealand | 1 (3) | 1 |

=== North America ===
| Rank | Country | Season(s) visited | Pit Stops |
|---|---|---|---|
| 1 | Belize | 1 (6) | 3 |
| 1 | Cuba | 1 (2) | 2 |
| 1 | Canada | 1 (2) | 2 |
| 1 | Mexico | 1 (6) | 3 |
| 1 | United States | 1 (3) | 0 |

=== South America ===
| Rank | Country | Season(s) visited | Pit Stops |
|---|---|---|---|
| 1 | Argentina | 2 (3, 8) | 4 |
| 2 | Colombia | 1 (6) | 3 |

=== Europe ===
| Rank | Country | Season(s) visited | Pit Stops |
|---|---|---|---|
| 1 | Turkey (Note: This includes times The Amazing Race Australia travelled to part of Turkey that is east of the Bosphorus Strait (as was the case in 6), which is part of the Asian continent.) (Note: Country was named Türkiye during 6.) | 2 (2, 6) | 5 |
| 2 | Croatia | 1 (3) | 1 |
| 2 | Czech Republic | 1 (1) | 2 |
| 2 | France | 1 (2) | 0 |
| 2 | Greece | 1 (6) | 3 |
| 2 | Netherlands | 1 (1) | 0 |
| 2 | Poland | 1 (1) | 1 |
| 2 | Portugal | 1 (3) | 1 |
| 2 | Russia | 1 (3) | 2 |

=== Africa ===
| Rank | Country | Season(s) visited | Pit Stops |
|---|---|---|---|
| 1 | Namibia | 2 (3, 8) | 4 |
| 1 | South Africa | 2 (1, 8) | 5 |
| 3 | Malawi | 1 (4) | 2 |
| 3 | Morocco | 1 (6) | 3 |
| 3 | Zimbabwe | 1 (4) | 1 |
| 3 | Zambia | 1 (4) | 1 |

=== Asia ===
| Rank | Country | Season(s) visited | Pit Stops |
|---|---|---|---|
| 1 | Thailand | 3 (3, 4, 8) | 5 (Note: Includes 1 Finish Line) |
| 2 | Cambodia | 2 (3, 7) | 4 |
| 2 | China (Note: Including the Special Administrative Regions of Hong Kong and Macau (1)) | 2 (1, 2) | 2 |
| 2 | India | 2 (2, 7) | 5 |
| 2 | Indonesia | 2 (1, 9) | 4 |
| 2 | Sri Lanka | 2 (1, 9) | 4 |
| 2 | Vietnam | 2 (1, 4) | 3 |
| 6 | Israel | 1 (1) | 2 |
| 6 | Malaysia | 1 (7) | 6 |
| 6 | Mongolia | 1 (4) | 2 |
| 6 | Nepal | 1 (9) | 3 |
| 6 | Philippines | 1 (2) | 1 |
| 6 | Singapore | 1 (1) | 0 |
| 6 | South Korea | 1 (4) | 2 |
| 6 | Taiwan | 1 (9) | 3 |
| 6 | United Arab Emirates | 1 (2) | 1 |
| 6 | Uzbekistan | 1 (9) | 3 |

=== Australia ===
The following list visits by the show to each Australian State and Territory.

| Rank | Jurisdiction | Season(s) visited | Pit Stops |
|---|---|---|---|
| 1 | Northern Territory | 3 (3, 4, 5) | 4 |
| 1 | New South Wales | 3 (2, 5, 6) | 6 |
| 1 | Victoria | 3 (1, 3, 6) | 1 |
| 4 | Queensland | 2 (2, 5) | 10 |
| 4 | Western Australia | 2 (1, 6) | 4 (Note: Includes 2 Finish Lines) |
| 6 | Australian Capital Territory | 1 (5) | 0 |
| 6 | South Australia | 1 (5) | 3 |
| 6 | Tasmania | 1 (5) | 3 |

=== Continent counts ===
The first season of The Amazing Race Australia visited four continents in total (three excluding Australia). Season two extended the racecourse to North America, and season three was the first time in South America as well as a visit to Oceania outside Australia. The Amazing Race Australia has yet to visit Antarctica.

| Rank | Continent | Seasons visited |
|---|---|---|
| 1 | Asia | 8 (1–4, 6–9) |
| 2 | Oceania (Continent of Australia and Pacific Islands) | 6 (1–6) |
| 3 | Africa | 5 (1, 3–4, 6, 8) |
| 4 | Europe | 4 (1–3, 6) |
| 5 | North America | 3 (2–3, 6) |
| 5 | South America | 3 (3, 6, 8) |

== Awards and nominations ==
Summary of awards and nominations
| Year | Award | Category | Nominated | Result | Ref |
|---|---|---|---|---|---|
| 2011 | Asian Television Awards | Best Adaptation of an Existing Format | Series 1, Episode 1 | Won | |
| 2011 | Asian Television Awards | Best Director | Michael McKay for Episode 1 | Won | |
| 2011 | ASE Awards | Omnilab Media Award for Best Editing in a Television Non-Drama | Joel Page and Tom Meadmore | Nominated | |
| 2012 | International Emmy | Non-Scripted Entertainment | Series 1 | Won | |
| 2012 | Asian Television Awards | Best Adaptation of an Existing Format | Series 2 | Nominated | |
| 2013 | AACTA Awards | Best Director | Michael McKay for Episode 1 | Nominated | |
| 2013 | AACTA Awards | Best Reality Television Series | Matthew Kowald and David Gardner | Won | |
| 2020 | AACTA Awards | Best Reality Television Series | Paul Franklin, Chris Culvenor, Sophia Mogford and Stephen Tate | Nominated | |
| 2021 | AACTA Awards | Best Reality Television Series | Sophia Mogford, Rikkie Proost, Evan Wilkes & Cathie Scott | Nominated | |
| 2022 | AACTA Awards | Best Reality Television Series | Paul Franklin, Rikkie Proost, Chris Culvenor & Sophia Mogford | Nominated | |
| 2024 | AACTA Awards | Best Entertainment Program | Rikkie Proost | Nominated | |
| 2025 | AACTA Awards | Best Reality Program | Jane Rowley, Rikkie Proost, Lucy Connors & Emma Hanna | Nominated | |
| 2025 | Screen Producers Australia Awards | Reality Series Production of the Year | Series 8 | Nominated | |
| 2026 | AACTA Awards | Best Reality Program | Rikkie Proost, Alenka Henry & Jane Rowley | Nominated | |

== See also ==
- Race Around the World
- Rush
