= Ko Thap =

Island in Thailand

Native name: เกาะทับ
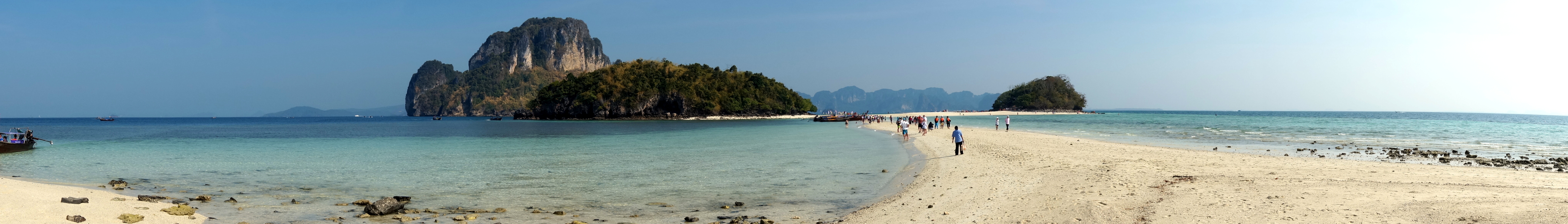
- Tha-le Waek, at low tide, tourists walking on the sand connecting Koh Tub, Koh Mor, and Koh Ka.
- Interactive map of Ko Thap

Geography
- Location: Strait of Malacca
- Coordinates: 7.961°N 98.81°E
- Archipelago: Poda Islands
- Area: 0.022 km^{2} (0.0085 sq mi)

Administration
- Thailand
- Province: Krabi
- District: Mueang Krabi
- Tambon: Ao Nang

Additional information
- Time zone: ICT (UTC+7)

Ko Thap (Thai: เกาะทับ, "Thap Island", sometimes spelled Tub) is an island in Krabi Province, Thailand. This island is a member of the Poda Archipelago, which is composed of Poda Island, Tub Island, Mor Island and Kai Island. Locals refer to Tab Island as Koh Tub.

== Activities ==
Aside from having beaches, a coral reef surrounds the area, which has attracted snorkeling and other outdoor activities.

== Separated Sea ==
At low tide, the three islands link together, forming a "Tha-le Waek" (Separated sea). Tourists can walk across the beach to all of the islands.
