= Buenos Aires Rowing Club =

Sports club in Argentina

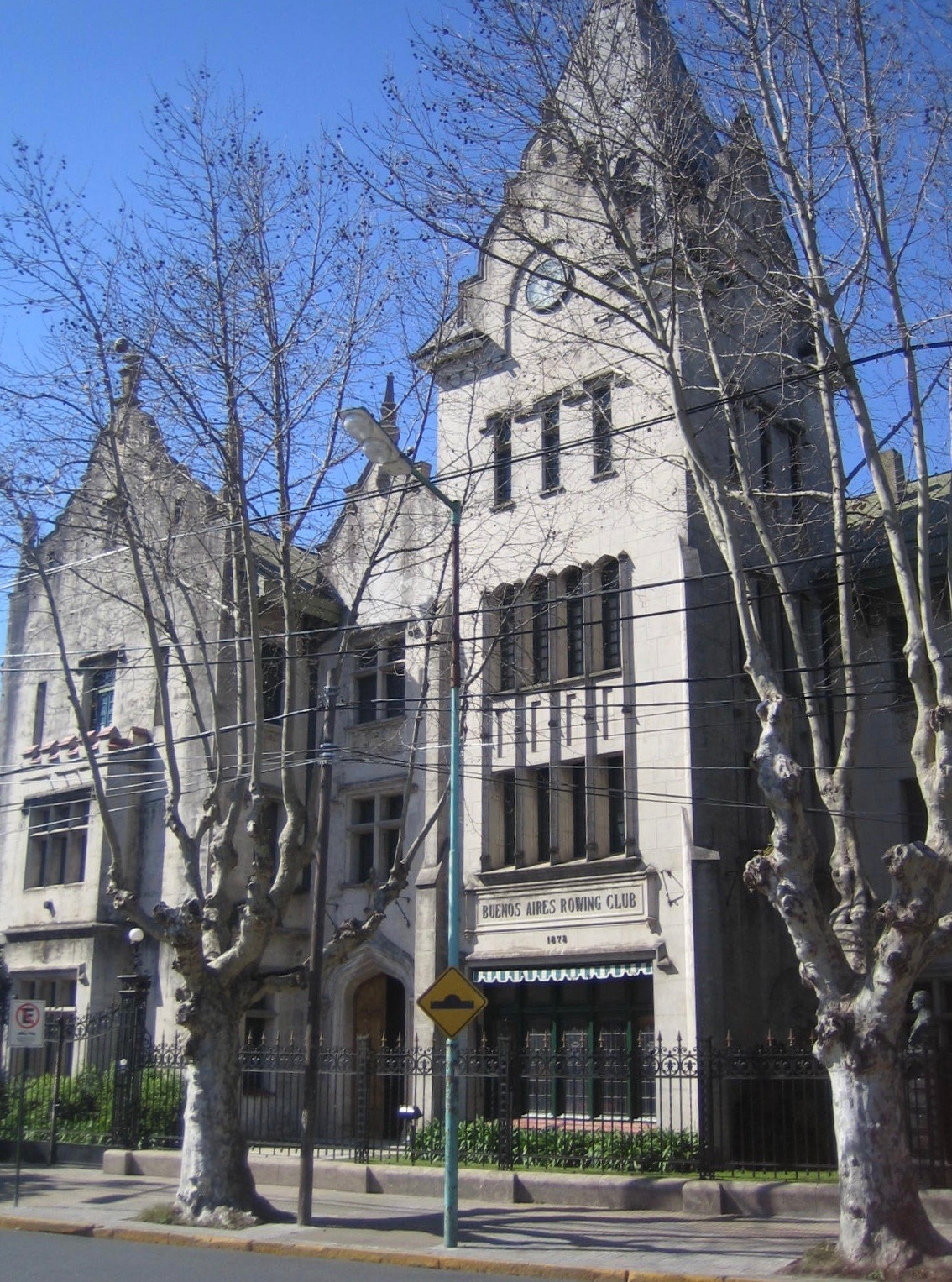

- Location: Tigre, Buenos Aires
- Home water: Tigre River
- Founded: December 16, 1873; 152 years ago
- Key people: Félix Fernandez Madero (President)
- Website: barc.com.ar

Buenos Aires Rowing Club is an Argentine sports club sited in Tigre, Buenos Aires, 30-km distance from the Buenos Aires autonomous city. Founded in 1873 and originally headquartered in the capital city, BARC is the oldest rowing club of Argentina.

Apart from rowing, other sports held by the institution are canoe racing, football, swimming, tennis, artistic gymnastics and roller skating.

== History ==
=== Background ===
Rowing was introduced in Argentina by British immigrants in the 1870s. A group of enthusiasts joined the port of Buenos Aires with Tigre (then named "Las Conchas") in about 3 hours. The first rowing clubs were Buenos Aires Rowing Club (established in 1873) and the Club de Regatas La Marina (1876), both located in the capital city while the first official regatta was held on December 8, 1873, with representatives from different countries taking part of it. President Domingo Sarmiento was one of the notable personalities that attended the event.

I am pleased with the celebration held today, even more than what you guess I am. I arrived as honorary member of this club to see the inauguration of a new style of fun in this country. It's very conforting for me –involved in the strict responsibilities of my position (as President of Argentina)– to come here and take part of these male sports that accomplish the ancient aphorism: "Mens sana in corpore sano"

— Domingo Sarmiento, from his speech during the first regatta held in Tigre, December 1873,

Despite being a difficult place to access, Tigre had optimal conditions to the practise of rowing. Because of that, the BARC members set a precarious box there to store their boats to be used on weekends.

The practise of rowing spread with the establishment of a third club, Rosario Rowing Club (sited in the homonymous city) in Santa Fe Province, 1887.

The yellow fever epidemic on Buenos Aires and the development of the railway network in the country were two factors that substantially influenced rowing clubs originally established in Buenos Aires to set their locations in Tigre, where they soon moved.

Fifteen years after being formed, the British-origin members of BARC separated from the institution to form their own institution, Tigre Boat Club (the first of that district) in 1888. In December 1901, the Argentine Rowing Association ("Asociación Argentina de Remo") is founded, with the six clubs existing by then: Buenos Aires Rowing Club, Club de Regatas La Marina, Tigre Boat Club, Club de Remo Teutonia (founded by the German community), Campana Boat Club and Club de Regatas Bella Vista.

=== Consolidation ===
On December 6, 1873 (six days after the first regatta was held), the rowers that had taken part in it met in the coffeehouse "Gymnasium" sited on Florida and Corrientes Avenue in Buenos Aires with the purpose of establishing a club. Supported by the British Consul in Argentina, they founded the "Buenos Aires Rowing Club" which became the first rowing club in the country. The BARC founder also agreed to accept all the rowing enthusiasts as members, including non-British citizens.

An old ship ("Sunny South") was the first seat of BARC until a neighbor, Leonardo Pereyra, donated a land bordering Matanza River and a wood shack was built there. In 1876 the club built another shack in Tigre. In 1885 the club acquired a 1,600 m2 land in the same region where a building would be constructed at a cost of $10,000.

In 1895 the seat in Riachuelo moved to Dársena Sur (La Boca), where the club remained until 1902 when it moved to a shed given by the Municipality of Buenos Aires that had been formerly used as slaughterhouse.

The main seat in Tigre was inaugurated in 1911. The building was refurbished and expanded in 1913. The main facade was modified to a Victorian architecture style.
