= Ko Poda =

Island in Thailand

Native name: เกาะปอดะ
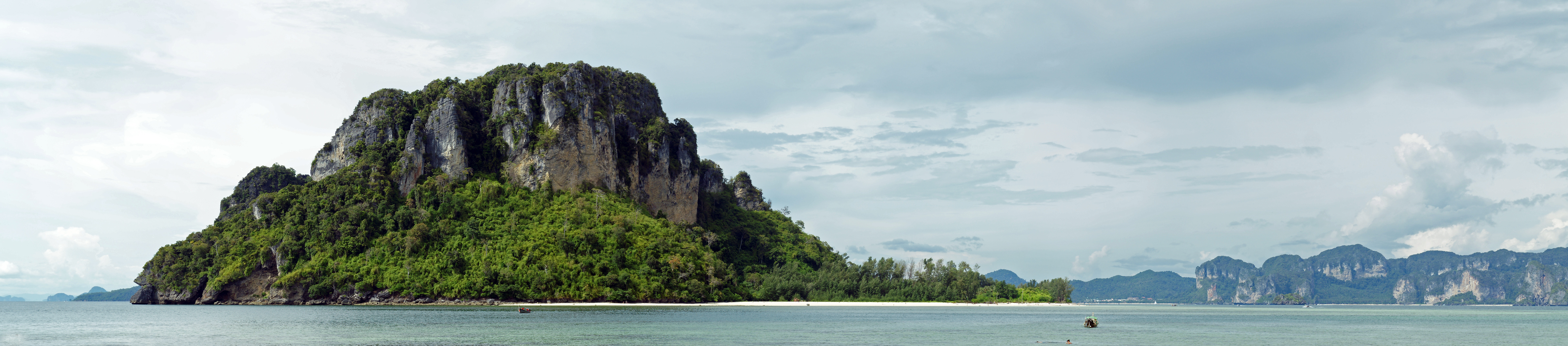
- Ko Poda seen from Ko Thap
- Interactive map of Ko Poda

Geography
- Location: Strait of Malacca
- Coordinates: 07°58′17″N 098°48′31″E
- Archipelago: Poda Islands
- Area: 0.46 km^{2} (0.18 sq mi)

Administration
- Thailand
- Province: Krabi
- District: Mueang Krabi
- Tambon: Ao Nang

Additional information
- Time zone: ICT (UTC+7)

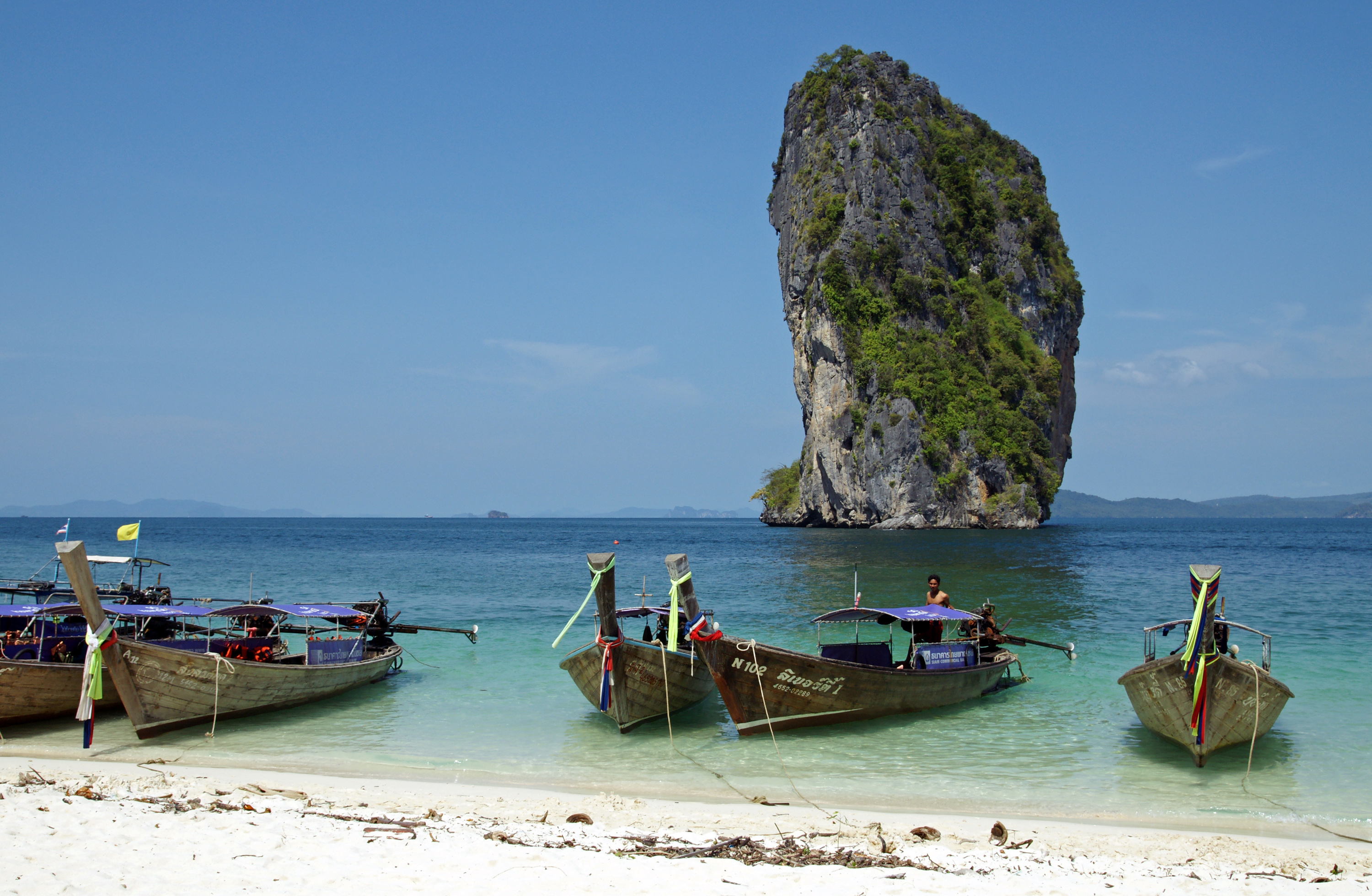
Beach

Ko Poda is an island off the west coast of Thailand, in Krabi Province, about 8 kilometres (5 mi) from Ao Nang. It is part of the Mu Ko Poda, or Poda Group Islands, which are under the administration of Hat Nopharat Thara-Mu Ko Phi Phi National Park. The group consists of Ko Poda, Ko Kai, Ko Mo and Ko Thap.
