= List of The Amazing Race Australia contestants =

This is a list of contestants who have appeared on The Amazing Race Australia, an Australian reality competition show based on the American series, The Amazing Race. A total of 180 contestants have appeared in the series.

== Contestants ==
=== Season 1 (2010) ===
Name	Age	Hometown	Finish	Source
Ryan "Ryot" Wilson	23	Sydney	11th	
Liberty Wilson	27	Sydney	11th	
Anne-Marie Brown	53	Perth	10th	
Tracy Read	46	Perth	10th	
Richard Toutounji	29	Sydney	9th	
Joey Toutounji	30	Sydney	9th	
Mohammed "Mo" El-Leissy	26	Melbourne	8th	
Mostafa "Mos" Haroun	25	Melbourne	8th	
Alana Munday	25	Adelaide	7th	
Melanie "Mel" Greig	28	Adelaide	7th	
Anastasia Natasa Drimousis	21	Sydney	6th	
Chris Pselletes	23	Sydney	6th	
David "Dave" Miller	52	Geraldton	5th	
Kelly Miller	37	Geraldton	5th	
Matthew "Matt" Nunn	26	Queensland	4th	
Thomas "Tom" Warriner	26	Northern Territory	4th	
Jeffrey "Jeff" Downes	60	Brisbane	3rd	
Lucas "Luke" Downes	32	Brisbane	3rd	
Samantha "Sam" Schoers	22	Perth	2nd	
Renae Wauhop	23	Perth	2nd	
Tyler Atkins	25	Sydney	1st	
Nathan Joliffe	25	Sydney	1st	

=== Season 2 (2011) ===
Name	Age	Hometown	Finish	Source
Adam Corowa	30	Tweed Heads	11th	
Dane Corowa	29	Tweed Heads	11th	
Susan "Sue" Bumback	40	Geraldton	10th	
Teresa Italiano	44	Geraldton	10th	
Kym Bouckaert	46	Brisbane	9th	
Donna Verney	42	Brisbane	9th	
Ross Thornton	55	Melbourne	8th	
Tarryn Lee Thornton	27	Melbourne	8th	
Geoff "Sticky" Stick	24	Launceston	7th	
Samuel "Sam" Hay	24	Launceston	7th	
James Kingsbury	23	Melbourne	6th	
Sarah Roza	32	Melbourne	6th	
Lucy Pelosi	36	Sydney	5th	
Emilia Pelosi	30	Sydney	5th	
Joseph Caristo	22	Sydney	4th	
Grace Caristo	21	Sydney	4th	
Michelle Troy	26	Sydney	3rd	
Joanne "Jo" Troy	26	Sydney	3rd	
Paul Montgomery	27	Melbourne	2nd	
Steven "Steve" Scale	29	Melbourne	2nd	
Shane Haw	43	Melbourne	1st	
Andrew Thoday	35	Melbourne	1st	

=== Season 3 (2014) ===
Name	Age	Hometown	Finish	Source
Inga Lederhaus	27	Perth	10th	
Tiharna McGregor	26	Perth	10th	
Elizabeth Grant	50	Adelaide	9th	
Todd Grant	25	Adelaide	9th	
Aston Garrett	32	Auckland	8th	
Christina "Christie" Orr	35	Auckland	8th	
Emily Trenberth	24	Christchurch	7th	
Jonathan "Jono" Trenberth	26	Christchurch	7th	
John Gbenda Charles	35	Christchurch	6th	
Murray Roeske	35	Wellington	6th	
Catherine "Cat" O'Brien	38	Hamilton	5th	
Jesse O'Brien	36	Hamilton	5th	
Carla Beazley	37	Tauranga	4th	
Hereni Fulton	42	Tauranga	4th	
Ashleigh "Ash" Jende	27	Melbourne	3rd	
Jarrod Jende	28	Melbourne	3rd	
Sally Yamamoto	33	Perth	2nd	
Tyson Smith	38	Perth	2nd	
Daniel Little	28	Sydney	1st	
Ryan Thomas	32	Sydney	1st	

=== Season 4 (2019) ===
Name	Age	Hometown	Finish	Source
Alana Pappas	21	Adelaide	11th	
Niko Pappas	19	Adelaide	11th	
Judy Bowe	53	Canberra	10th	
Therese Mills	45	Canberra	10th	
Rowah Hassan	42	Sydney	9th	
Amani Mawass	18	Sydney	9th	
Chris Williams	58	Mount Compass	8th	
Adrienne Clarke	59	Mount Compass	8th	
Hayley Foruria	29	Townsville	7th	
Mikayla Foruria	24	Cairns	7th	
Sidney "Sid" Pierucci	26	Bondi Beach	6th	
Ashley "Ash" Ruscoe	30	Bondi Beach	6th	
Femi Ogunsiji	23	Sydney	5th	
Nicholas "Nick" Evbuomwan	23	Sydney	5th	
Tom Wilkinson	23	Melbourne	4th	
Tyler Roos	23	Melbourne	4th	
Vivienne "Viv" Dinh	25	Melbourne	3rd	
Joey Dinh	28	Melbourne	3rd	
Jasmin Onus	30	Darwin	2nd	
Jerome Cubillo	30	Darwin	2nd	
Tim Sattler-Jones	29	Newcastle	1st	
Rod Sattler-Jones	28	Newcastle	1st	

=== Season 5 (2021) ===
Name	Age	Hometown	Finish	Source
Alex Newell	28	Sydney	16th	
Jack Newell	28	Sydney	16th	
Jude Richards	49	Brisbane	15th	
Shannon Nay	45	Gold Coast	15th	
Malaan Ajang	27	Melbourne	14th	
Tina Kuek	26	Melbourne	14th	
Shane Wilson	47	Wollongong	13th	
Deborah "Deb" Wilson	41	Wollongong	13th	
Jobelle Collier	29	Shepparton	12th	
Rani Alegre	52	Shepparton	12th	
Sefa Palu	29	Sydney	11th	
Jessica Matavao	32	Sydney	11th	
Dwesmond "Dwes" Wiggan-Dann	32	Ardyaloon	10th	
Katherine Dann	31	Broome	10th	
Jordan Saisi	23	Melbourne	9th	
Violeta Brau Mugica	22	Melbourne	9th	
Stan Turek	36	Richmond	8th	
Wayne Marino	26	Richmond	8th	
Holly Edwards	25	Sydney	7th	
Dolor Edosomwan	26	Sydney	7th	
Marijana "MJ" Rajčić	31	Adelaide	6th	
Chelsea Randall	29	Adelaide	6th	
Skye-Blue Henderson	27	Melbourne	5th	
Jake Henderson	29	Long Forest	5th	
Chris Peever DiLoreto	31	Brisbane	4th	
Aleisha Rose Groth	30	Brisbane	4th	
Jaskirat Dhingra	29	Sydney	3rd	
Anurag Sobti	29	Sydney	3rd	
Ashleigh Lawrence	32	Gold Coast	2nd	
Amanda Blanks	29	Gold Coast	2nd	
Brendon Crawley	25	Yass	1st	
Jackson Dening	23	Tamworth	1st	

=== Season 6 (2022) ===
Name	Age	Hometown	Finish	Source
Paul Farrell	67	Phillip Island, Victoria	20th	
Rachel Farrell	33	Phillip Island, Victoria	20th	
Brenda "Bren" Wilkinson	56	Western Australia	19th	
Anja Gramueller-Southon	53	Western Australia	19th	
Jake O'Brien	29	Sydney, New South Wales	18th	
Holly MacAlpine	24	Sydney, New South Wales	18th	
Sam Trenwith	27	Adelaide, South Australia	17th	
Alex Hill	28	Adelaide, South Australia	17th	
Sam Kimberley	23	Perth, Western Australia	16th	
Stuart "Stu" Moorhouse	23	Perth, Western Australia	16th	
Crystal Tawil	27	New South Wales	15th	
Reem Chokr	26	New South Wales	15th	
Tammy Chan	42	Victoria	14th	
Vincent Chan	40	Queensland	14th	
Morgan Trevethan	23	Gold Coast, Queensland	13th	
Lilli Robbo	23	Gold Coast, Queensland	13th	

=== Season 7 (2023) ===
Name	Age	Hometown	Finish	Source
Dane Simpson	40	Wagga Wagga	11th	
Bow Simpson	69	Walgett	11th	
Grant Denyer	45	Bathurst	10th	
Cheryl "Chezzi" Denyer	43	Bathurst	10th	
Peter Rowsthorn	60	Perth	9th	
Frankie Rowsthorn	20	Perth	9th	
Ben Gillies	43	Melbourne	8th	
Jackie Gillies	42	Melbourne	8th	
George Mladenov	33	Bankstown	7th	
Pamela Mladenov	24	Bankstown	7th	
Rebecca "Bec" Judd	40	Melbourne	6th	
Kate Twigley	38	Perth	6th	
Jana Pittman	40	Castle Hill	5th	
Cornelis Rawlinson	16	Castle Hill	5th	
Harry Jowsey	26	Los Angeles	4th	
Teddy Briggs	29	Gold Coast	4th	
Alli Simpson	25	Gold Coast	1st	
Angie Simpson	52	Gold Coast	1st	
Emma Watkins	33	Robertson	1st	
Hayley Watkins	34	Sydney	1st	
Darren McMullen	41	Sydney	1st	
Tristan Dougan	26	Sydney	1st	

== Gallery ==
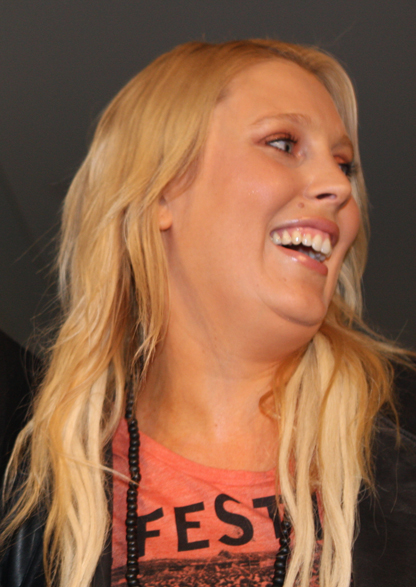
Mel Greig from The Amazing Race Australia 1

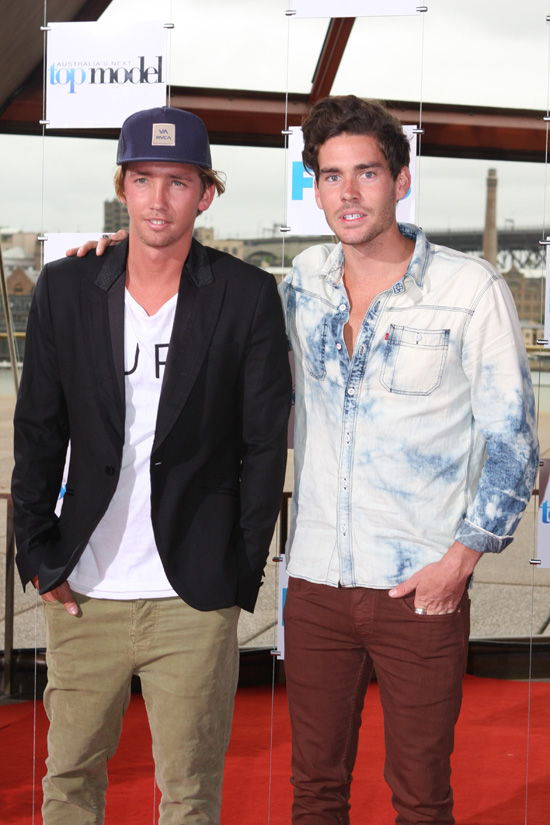
Tyler Atkins and Nathan Joliffe, winners of The Amazing Race Australia 1

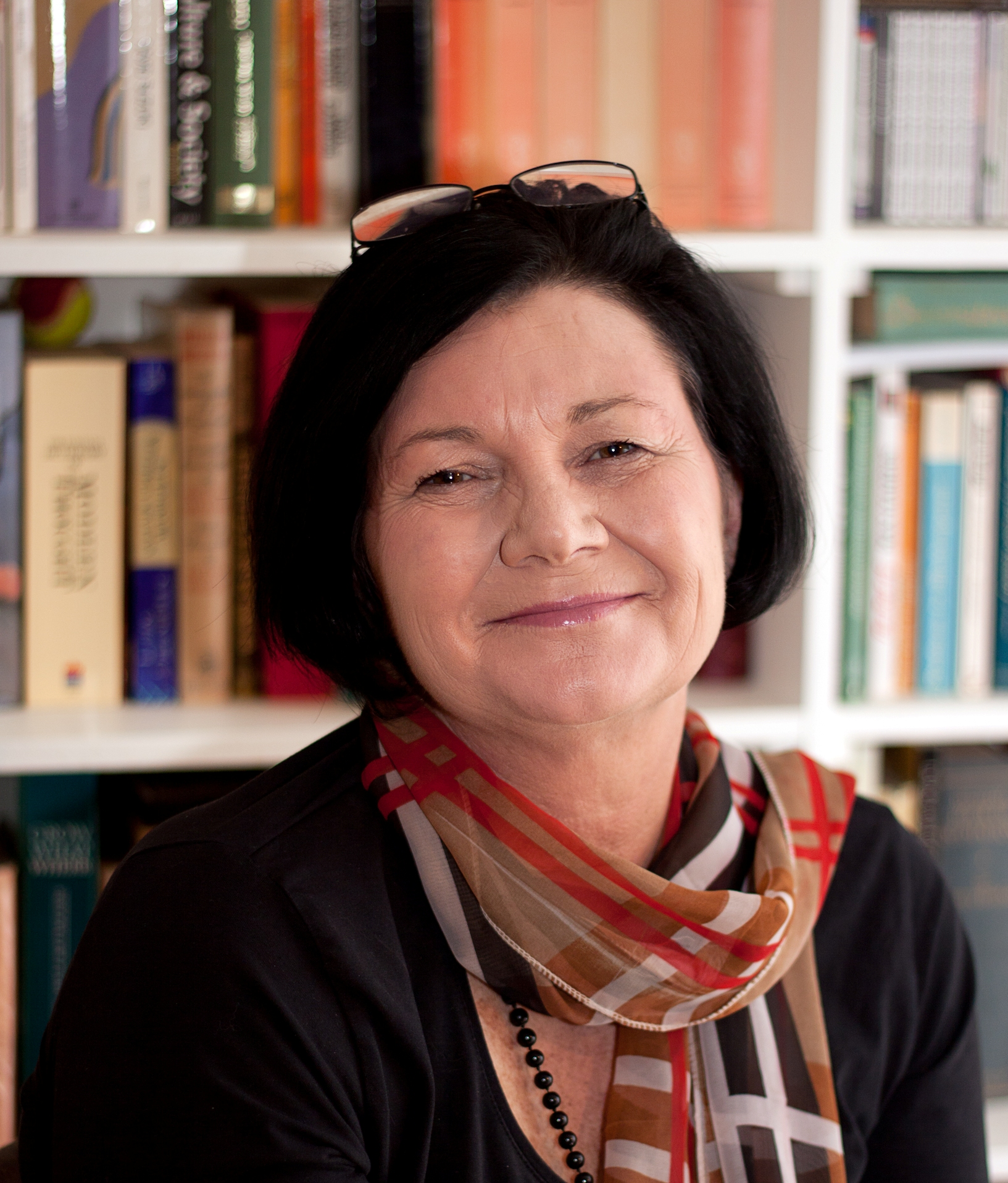
Elizabeth Grant from The Amazing Race Australia 3

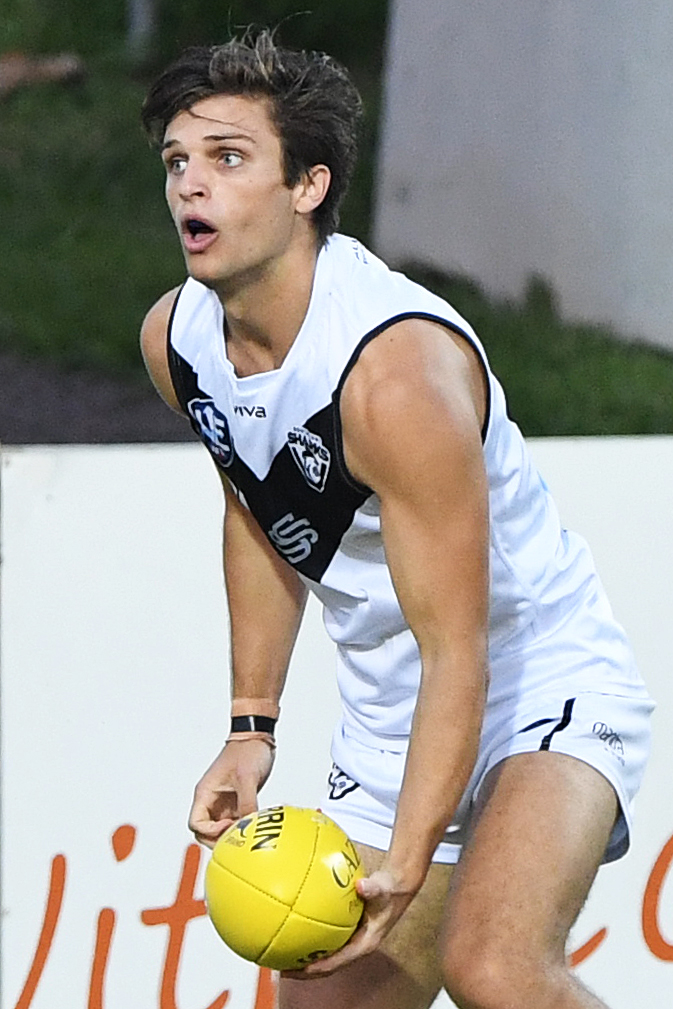
Tyler Roos from The Amazing Race Australia 4

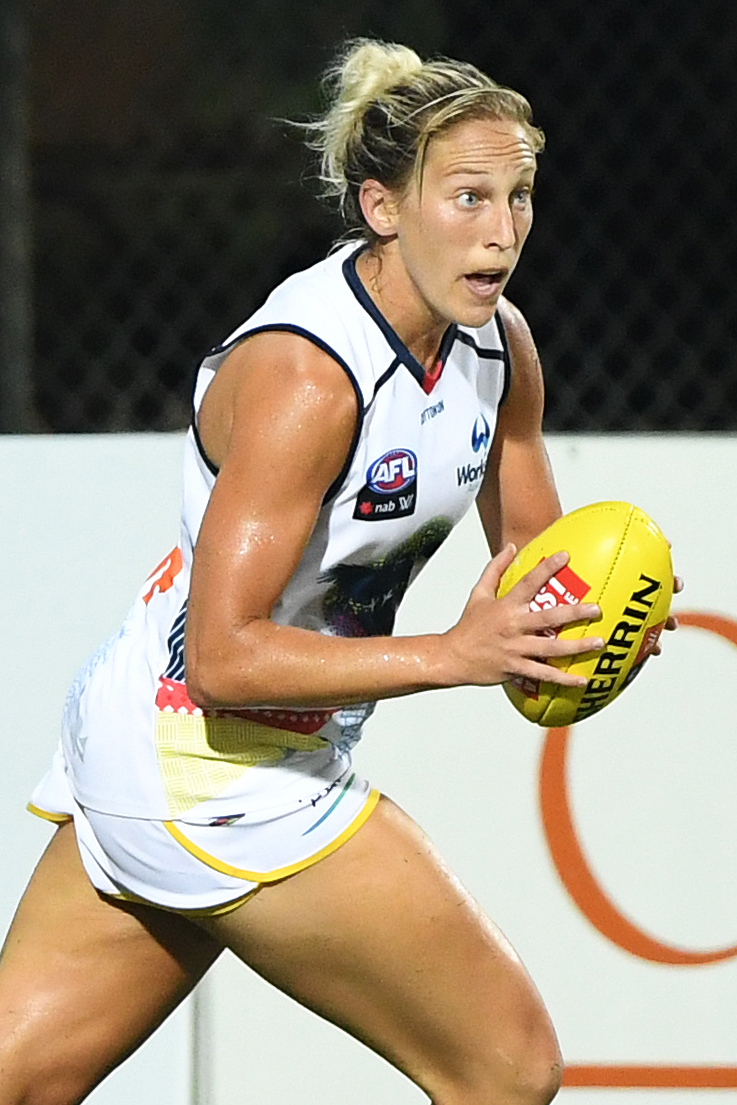
Marijana "MJ" Rajčić from The Amazing Race Australia 5

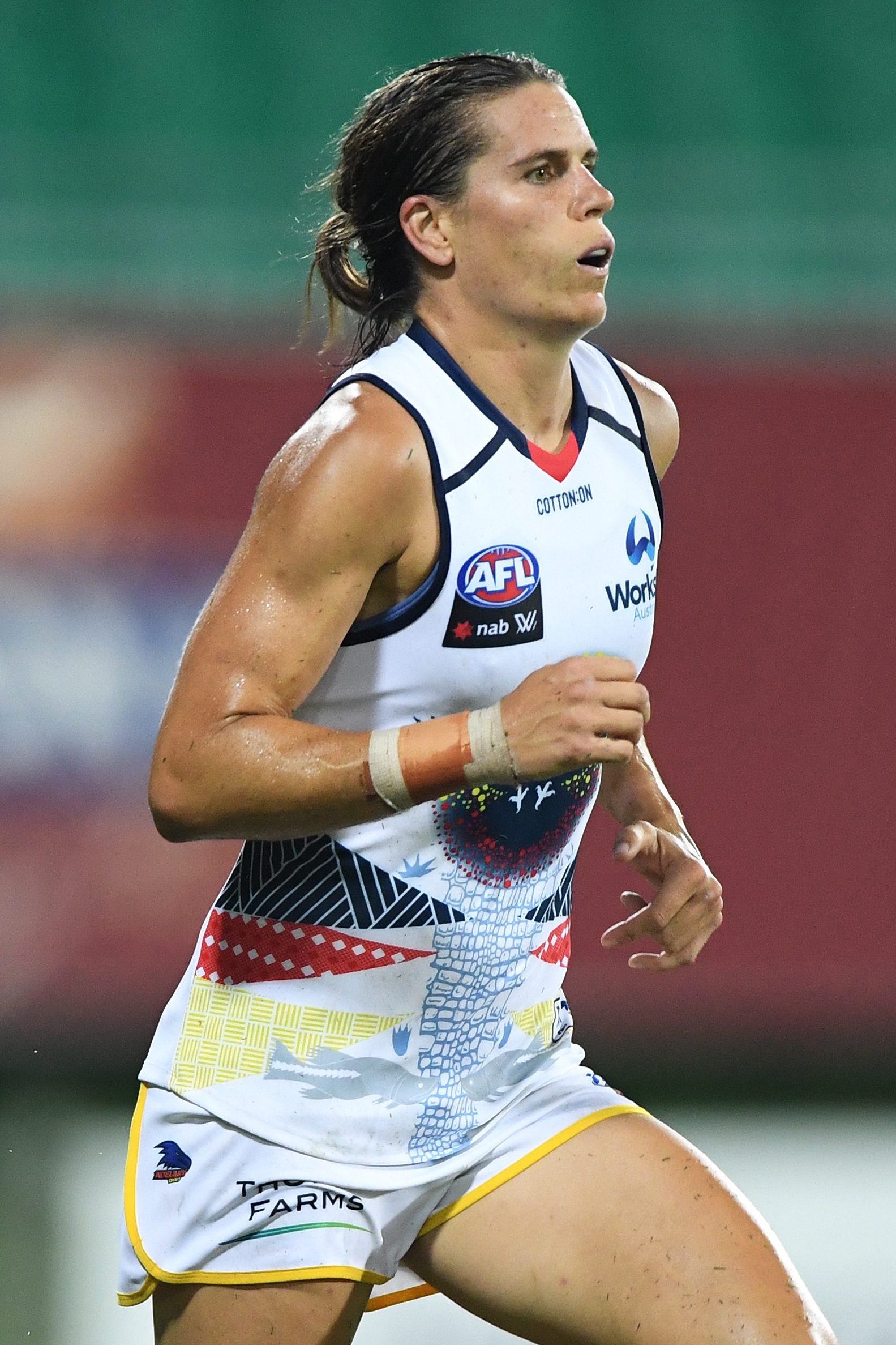
Chelsea Randall from The Amazing Race Australia 5

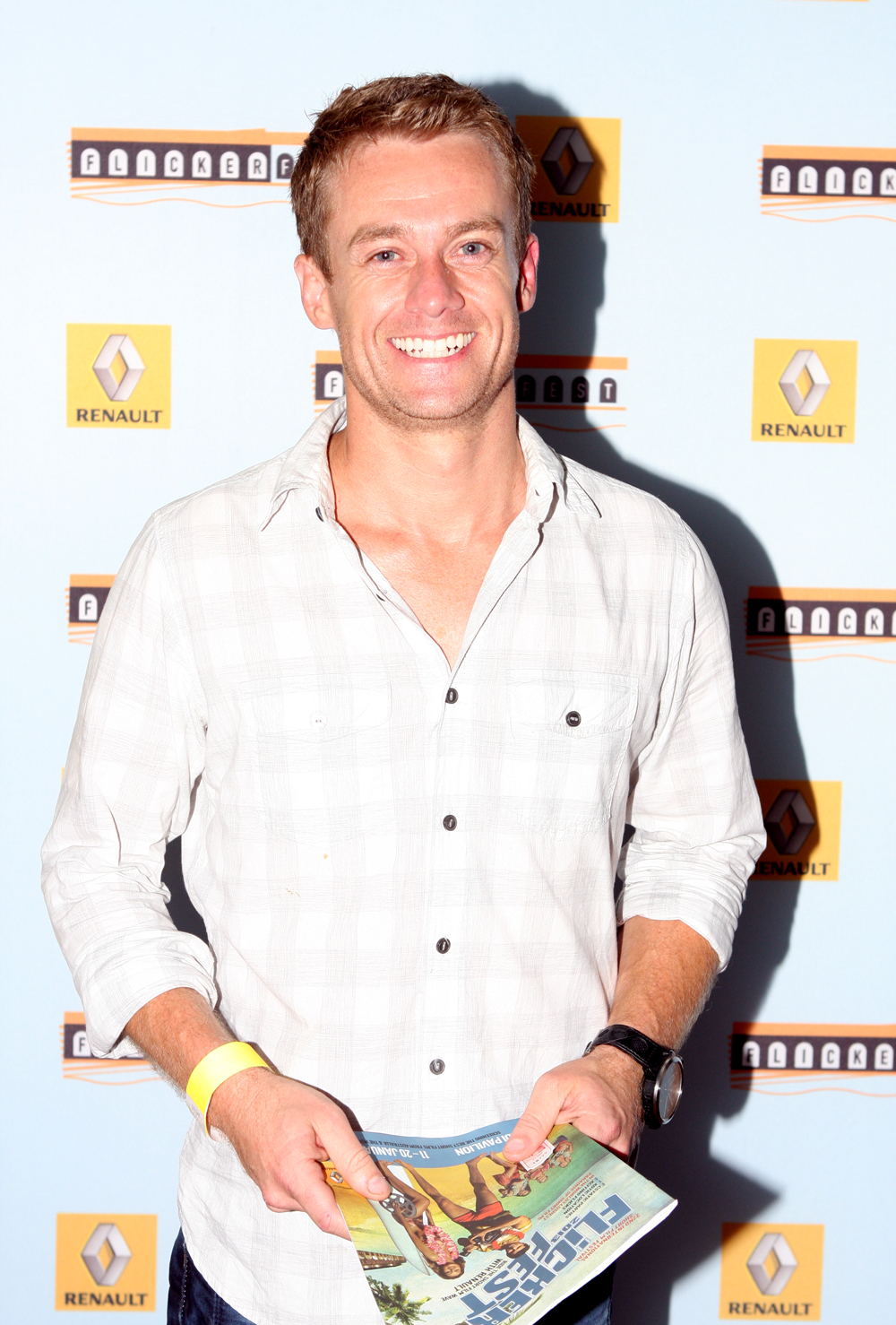
Grant Denyer from The Amazing Race Australia 7

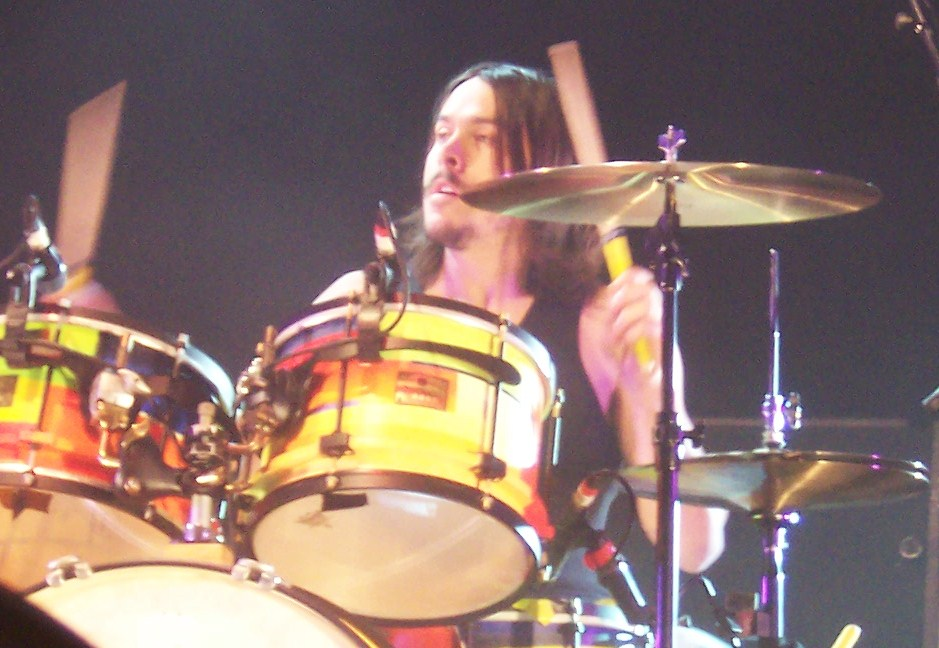
Ben Gillies from The Amazing Race Australia 7

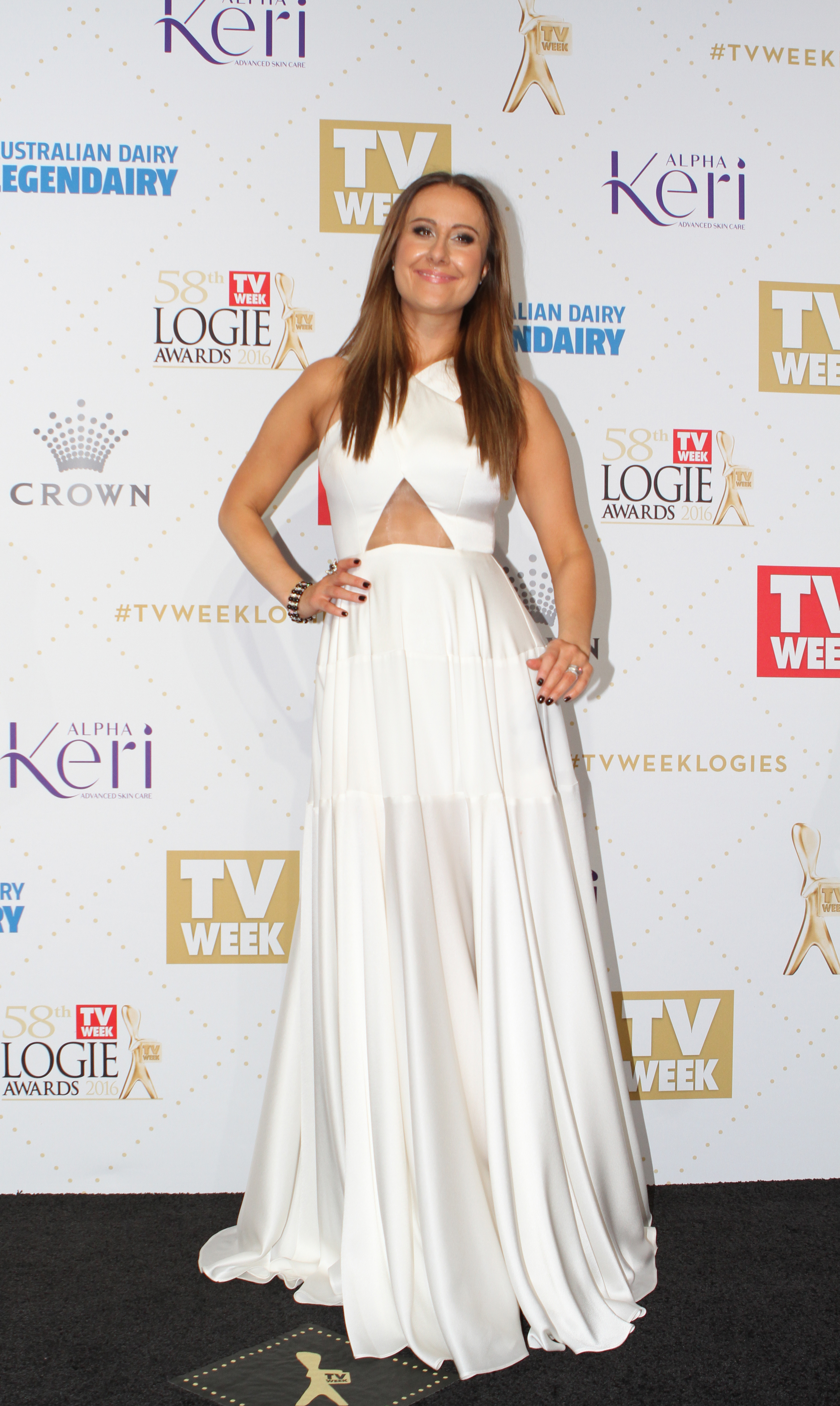
Jackie Gillies from The Amazing Race Australia 7

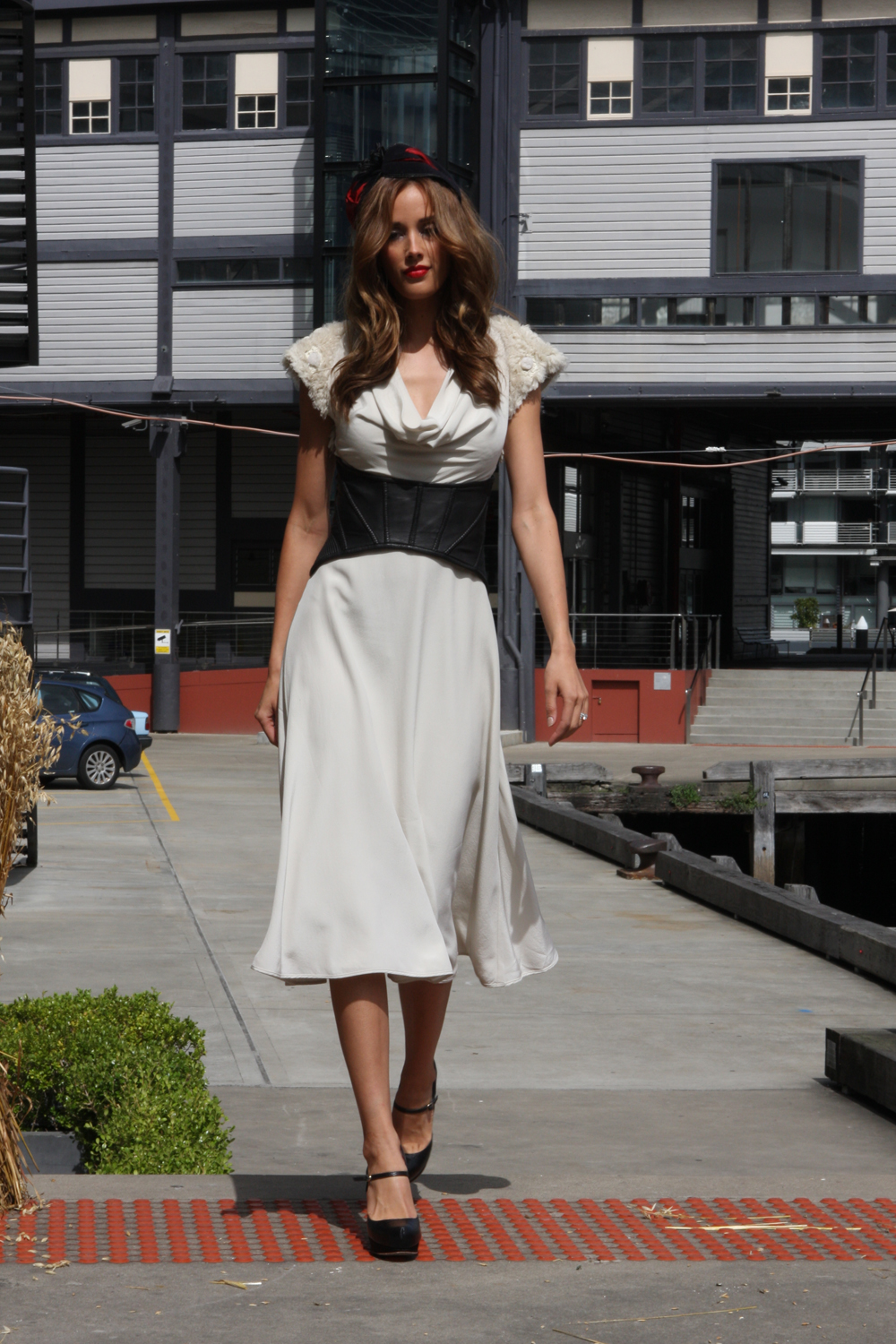
Rebecca Judd from The Amazing Race Australia 7

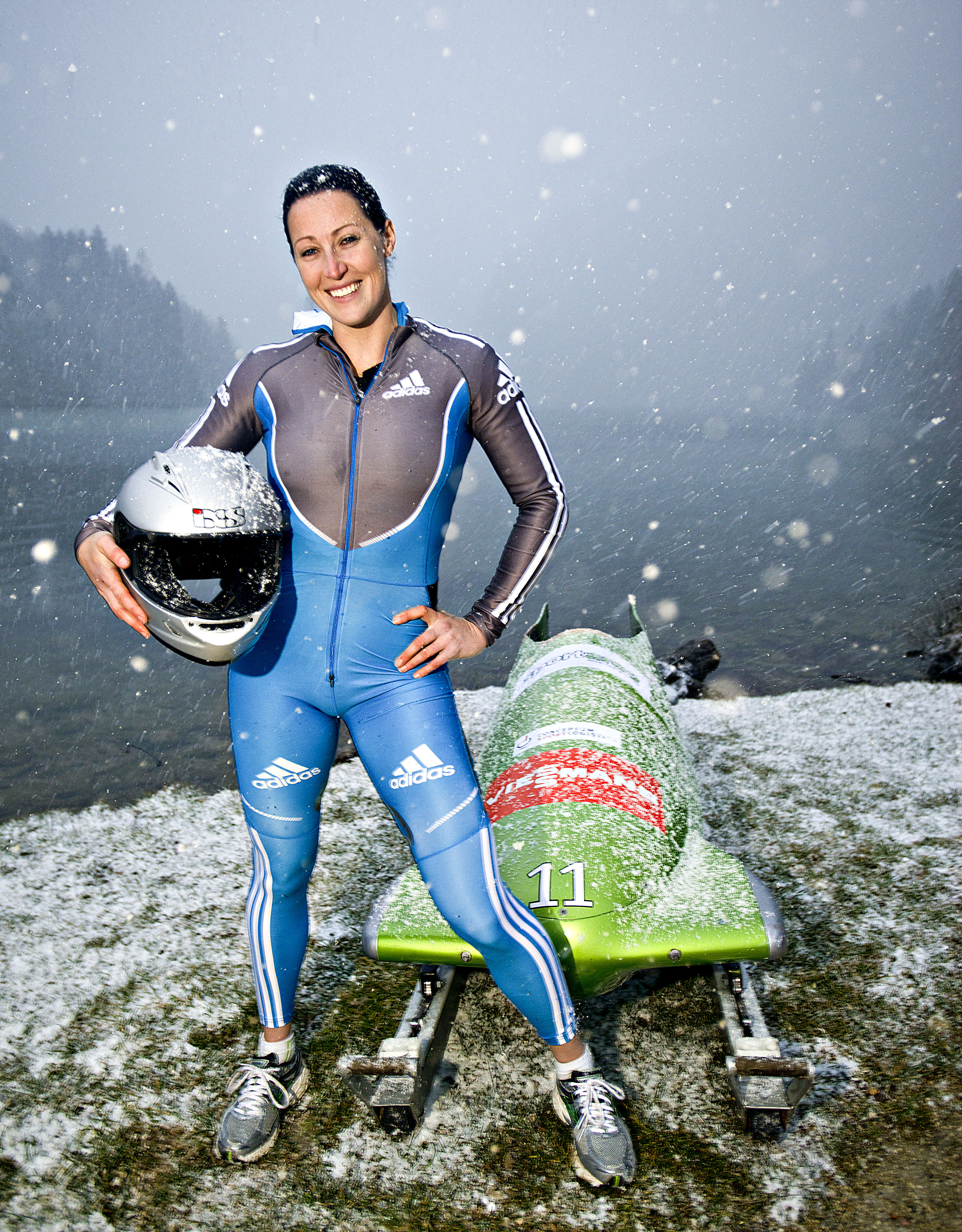
Jana Pittman from The Amazing Race Australia 7

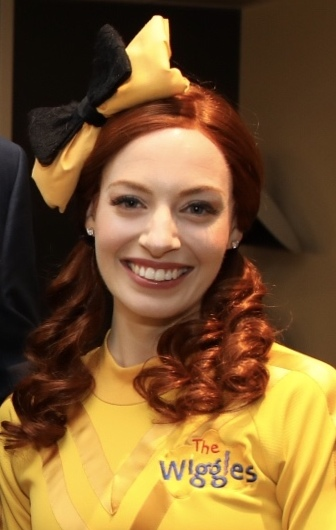
Emma Watkins from The Amazing Race Australia 7

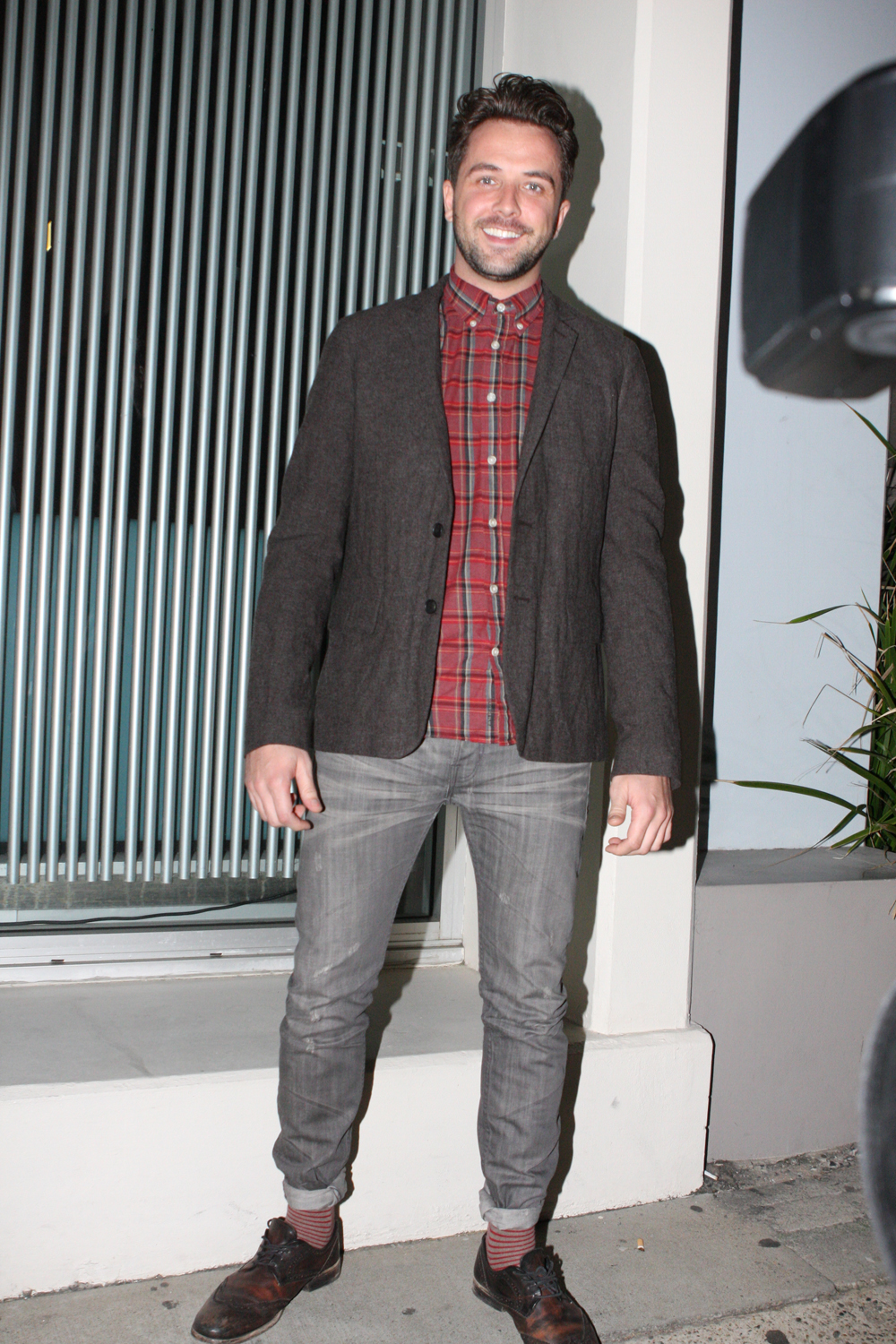
Darren McMullen from The Amazing Race Australia 7

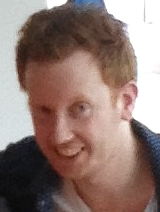
Luke McGregor from The Amazing Race Australia 8

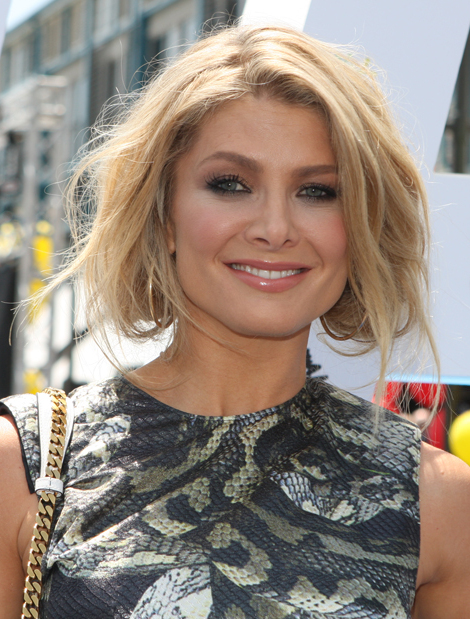
Natalie Bassingthwaighte from The Amazing Race Australia 8

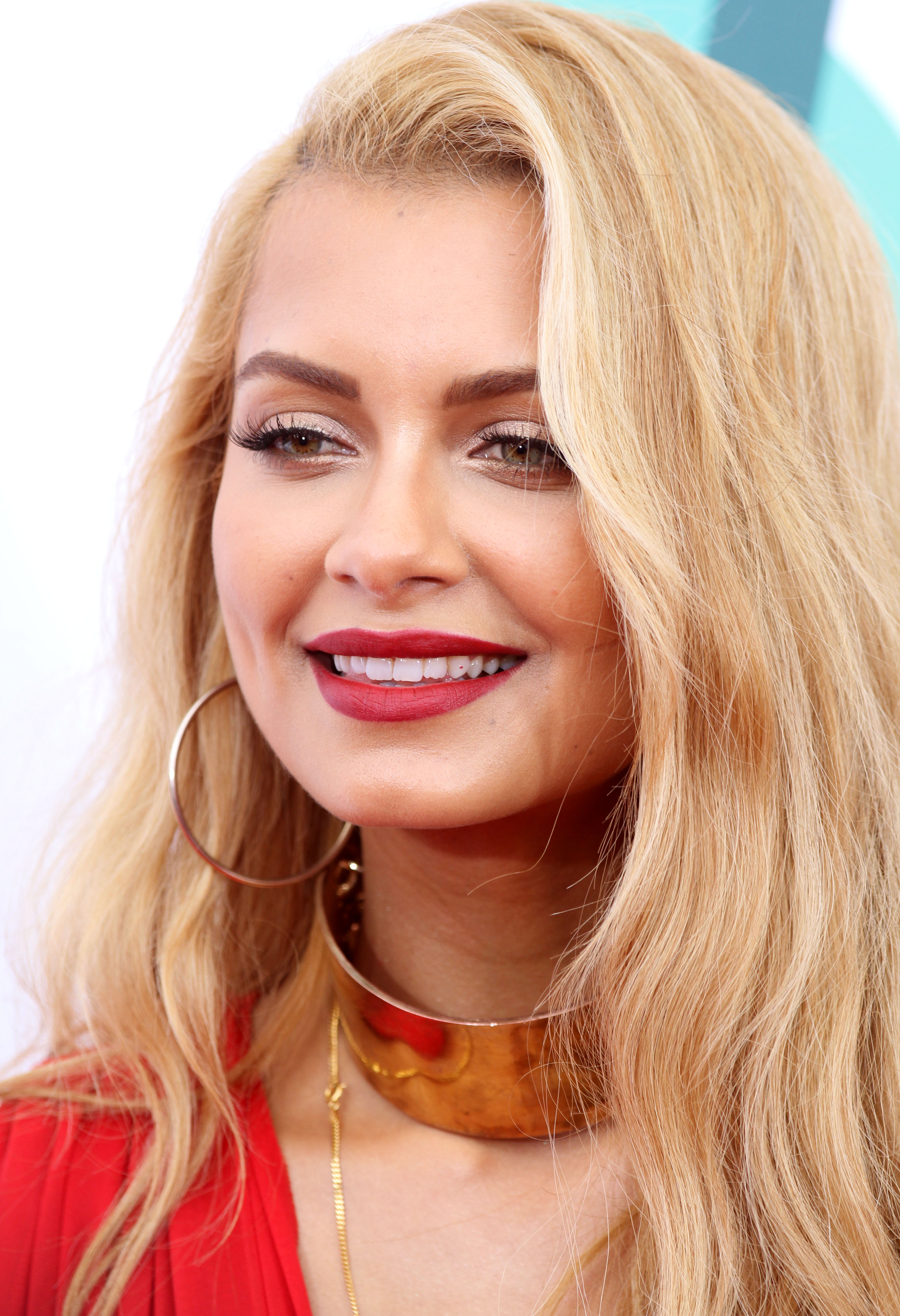
Havana Brown from The Amazing Race Australia 8

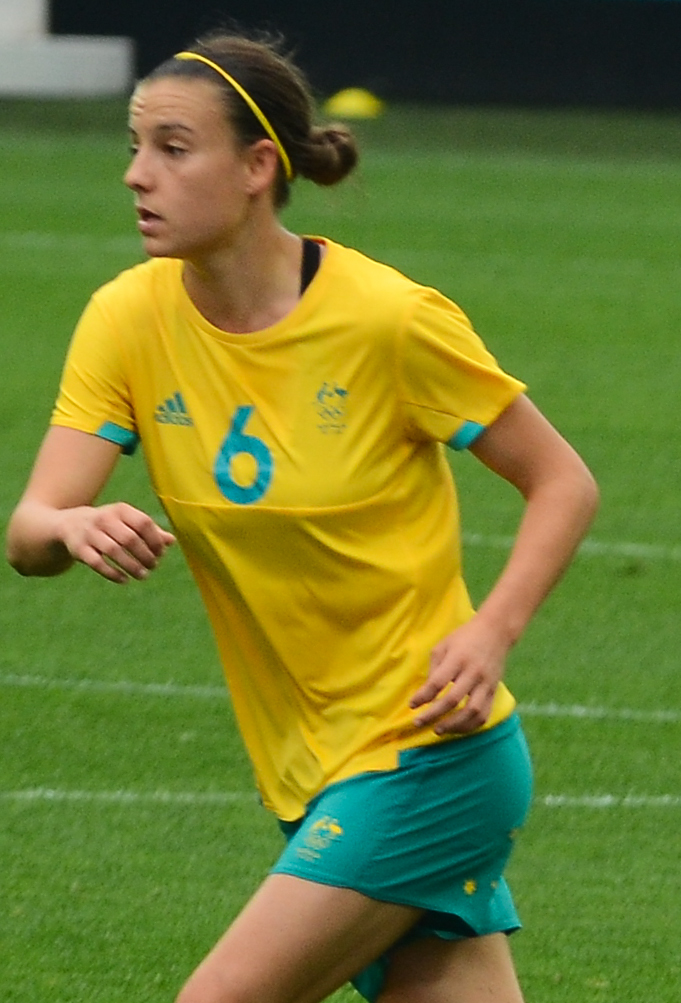
Chloe Logarzo from The Amazing Race Australia 8

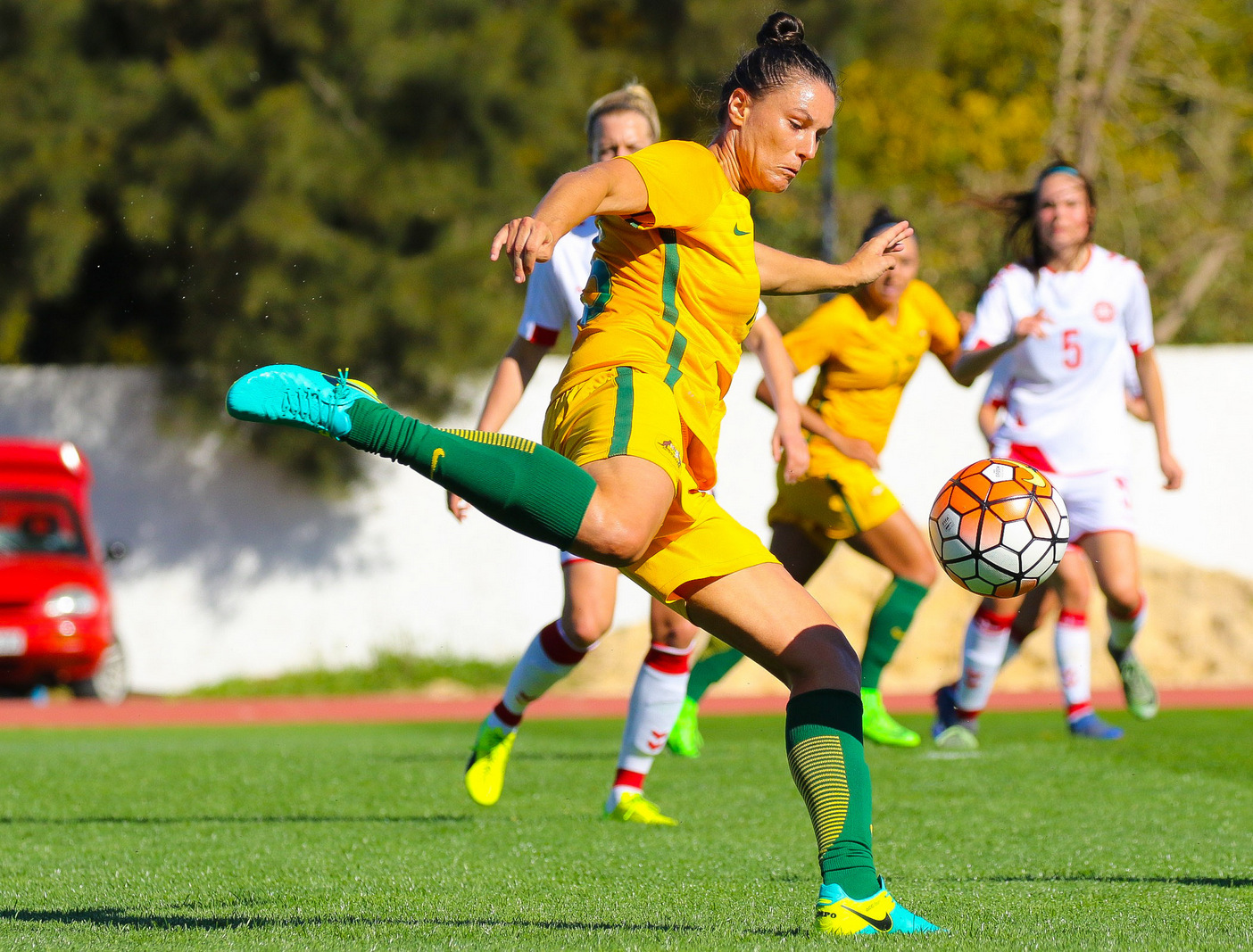
Emily Gielnik from The Amazing Race Australia 8

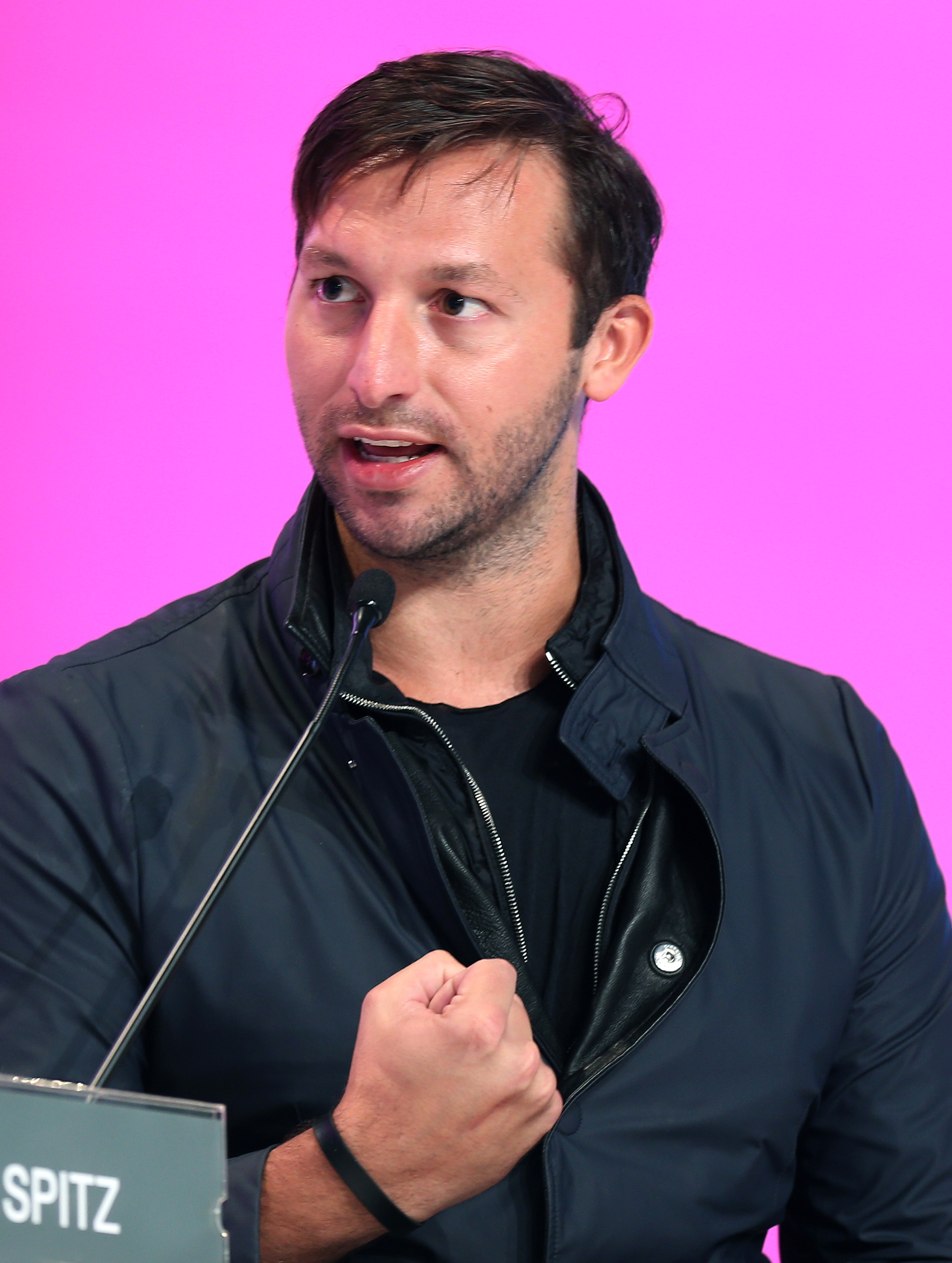
Ian "Thorpie" Thorpe from The Amazing Race Australia 8

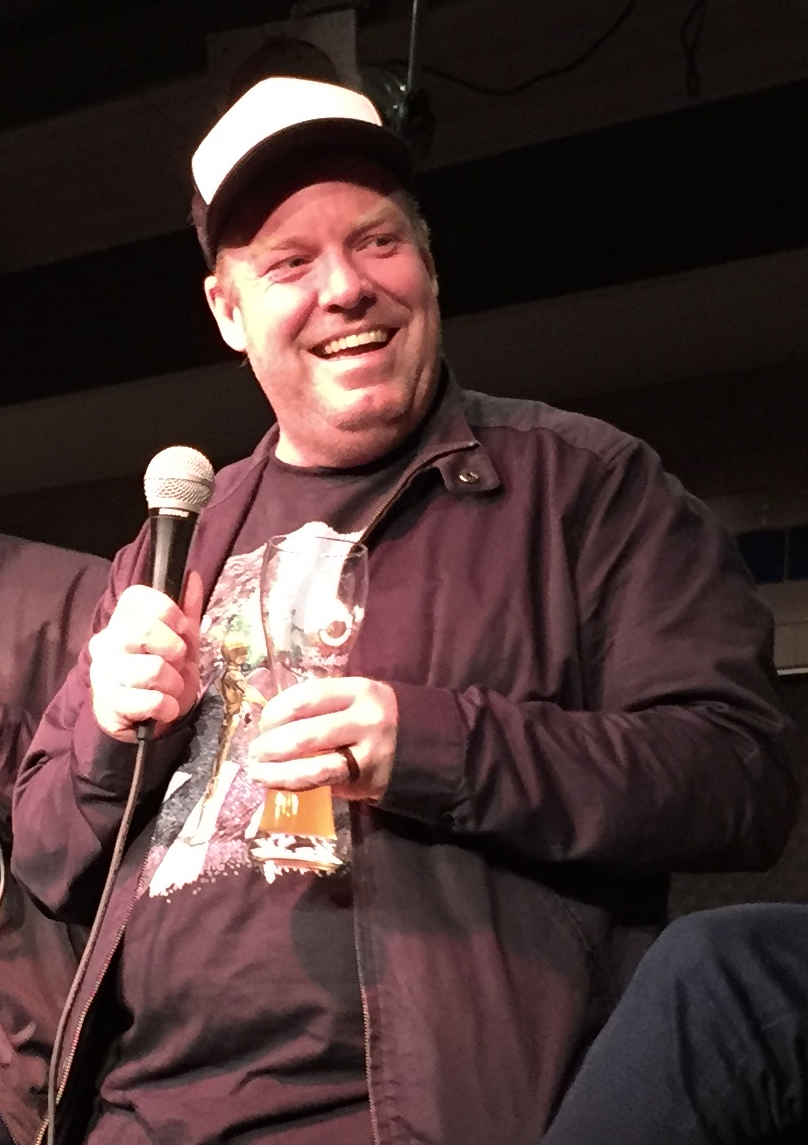
Peter Helliar from The Amazing Race Australia 8

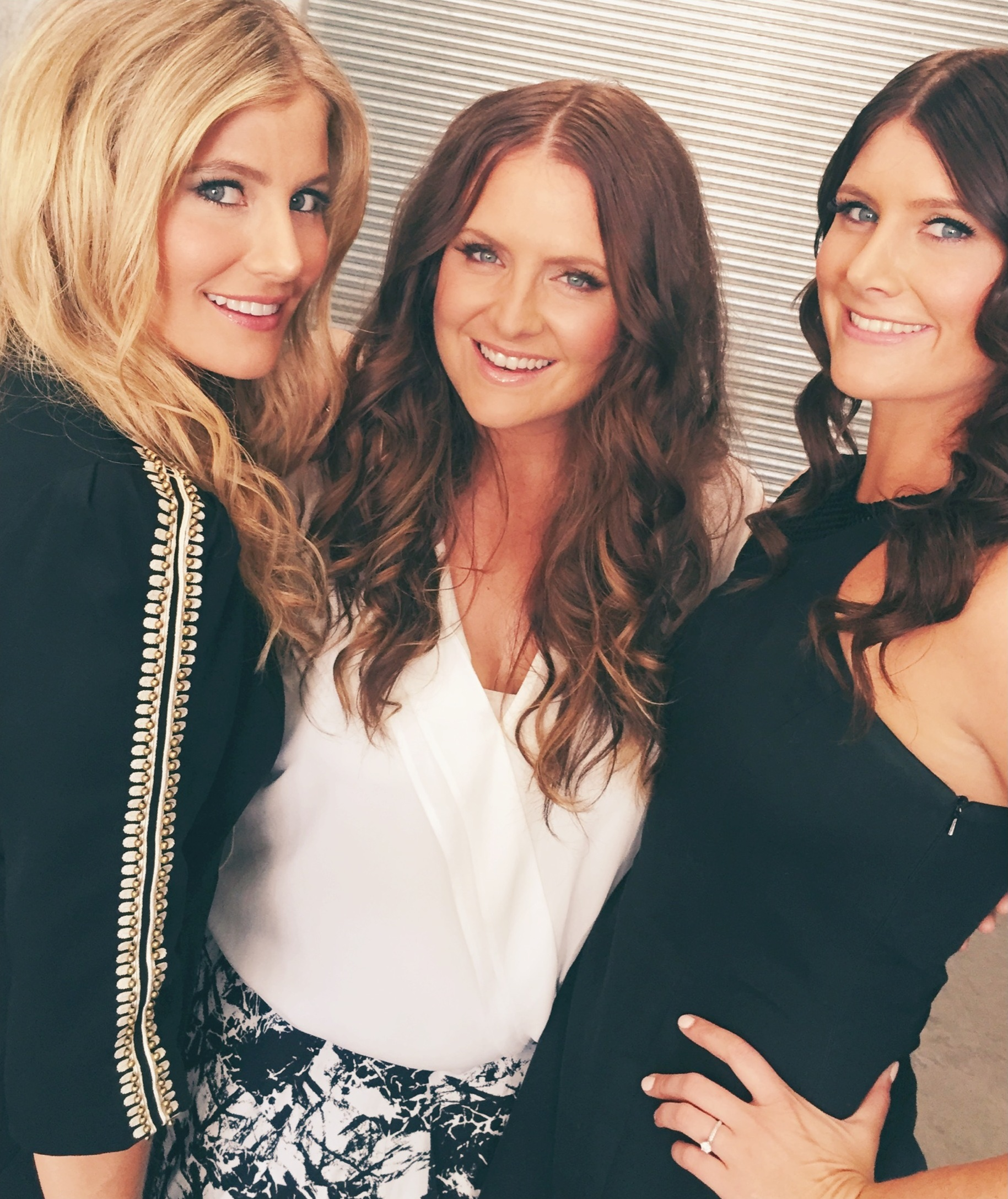
Brooke McClymont from The Amazing Race Australia 8

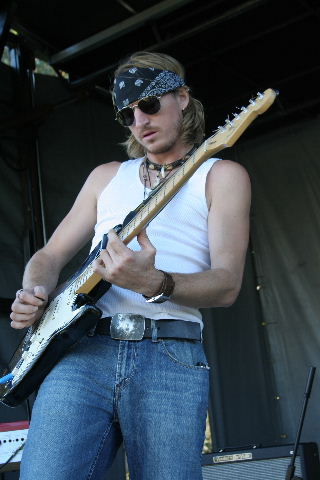
Adam Eckersley from The Amazing Race Australia 8

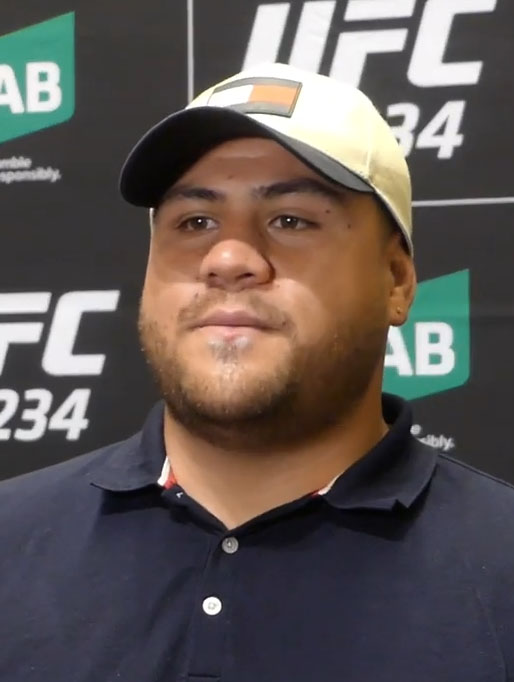
Tai "Bam Bam" Tuivasa from The Amazing Race Australia 8

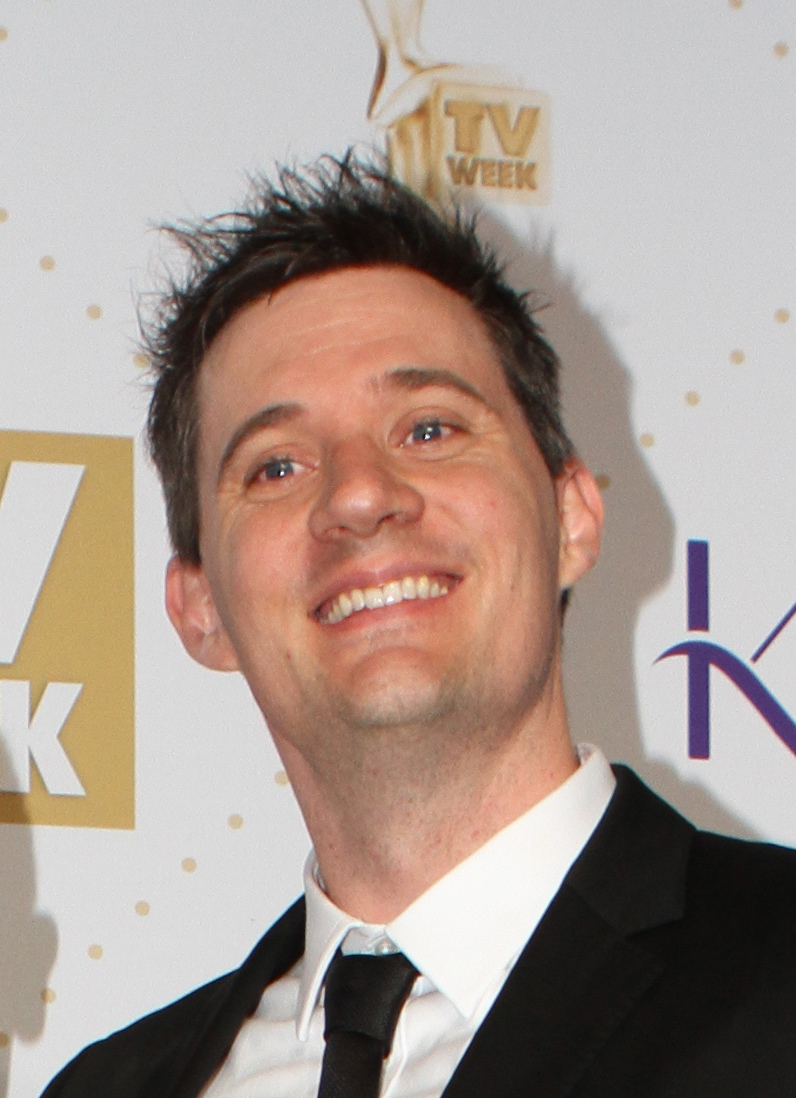
Ed Kavalee from The Amazing Race Australia 9

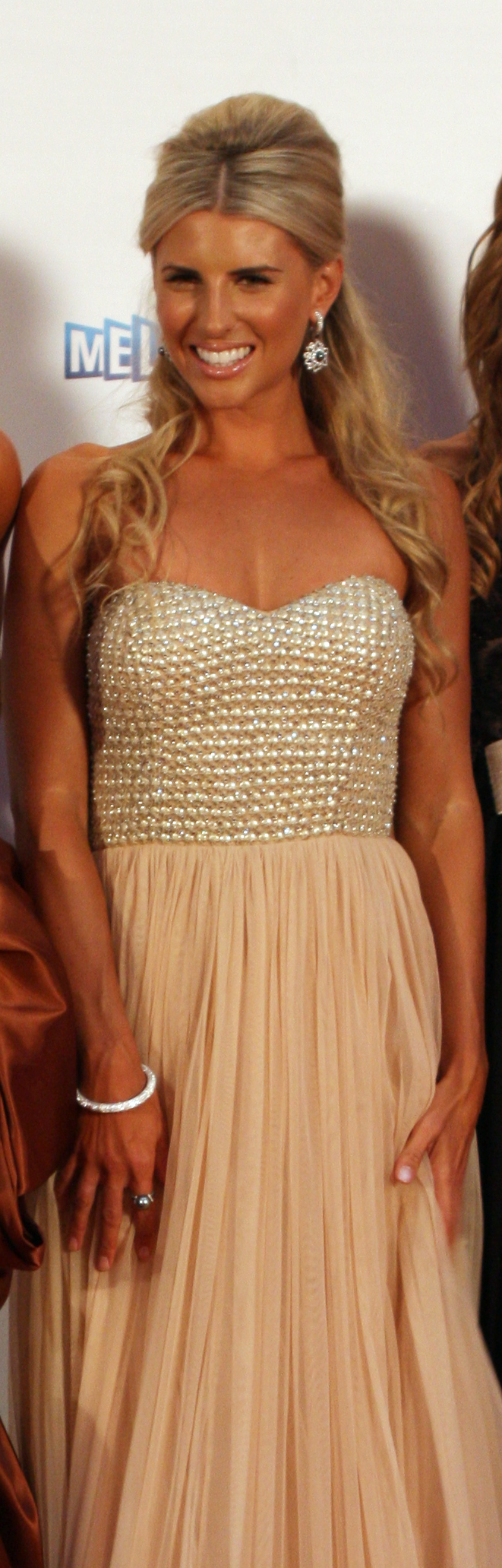
Tiffiny Hall from The Amazing Race Australia 9

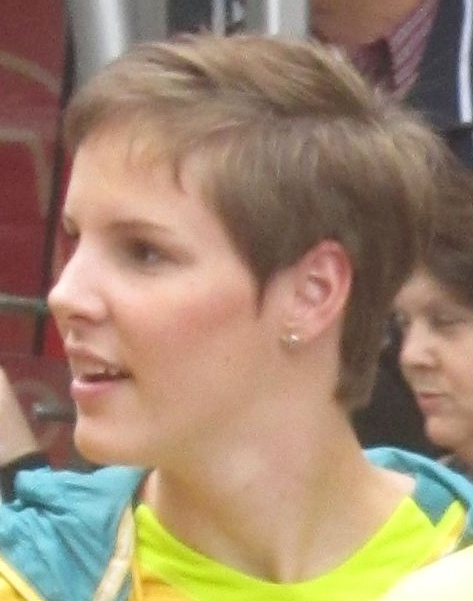
Bronte Campbell from The Amazing Race Australia 9

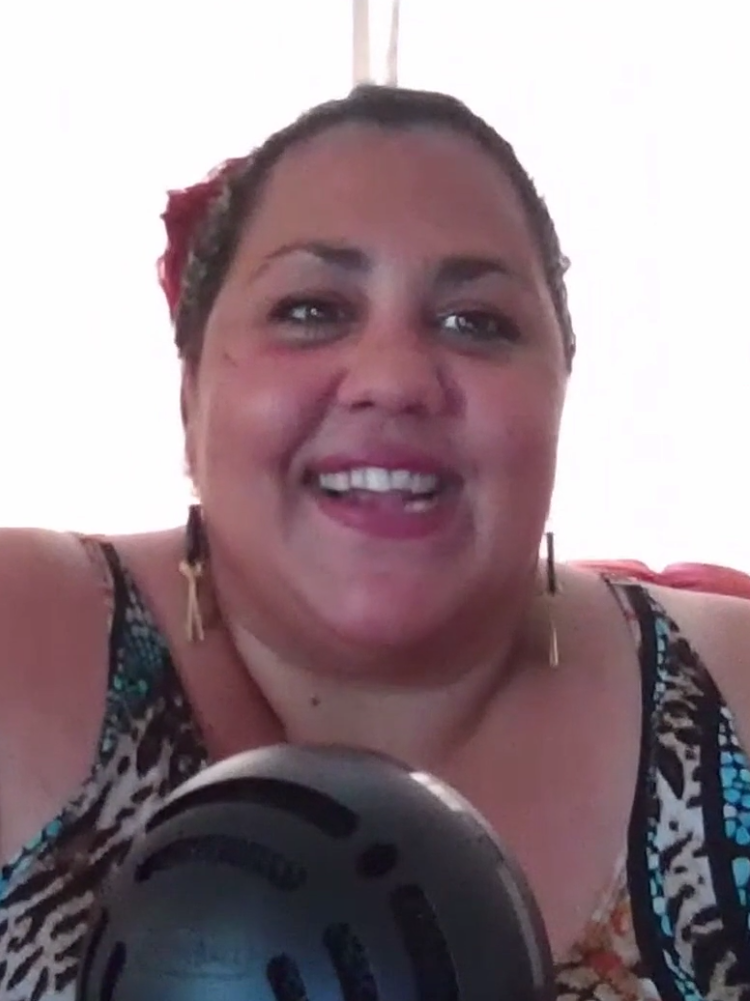
Steph Tisdell from The Amazing Race Australia 9

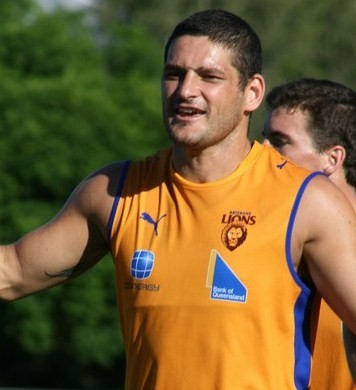
Brendan "Fev" Fevola from The Amazing Race Australia 9

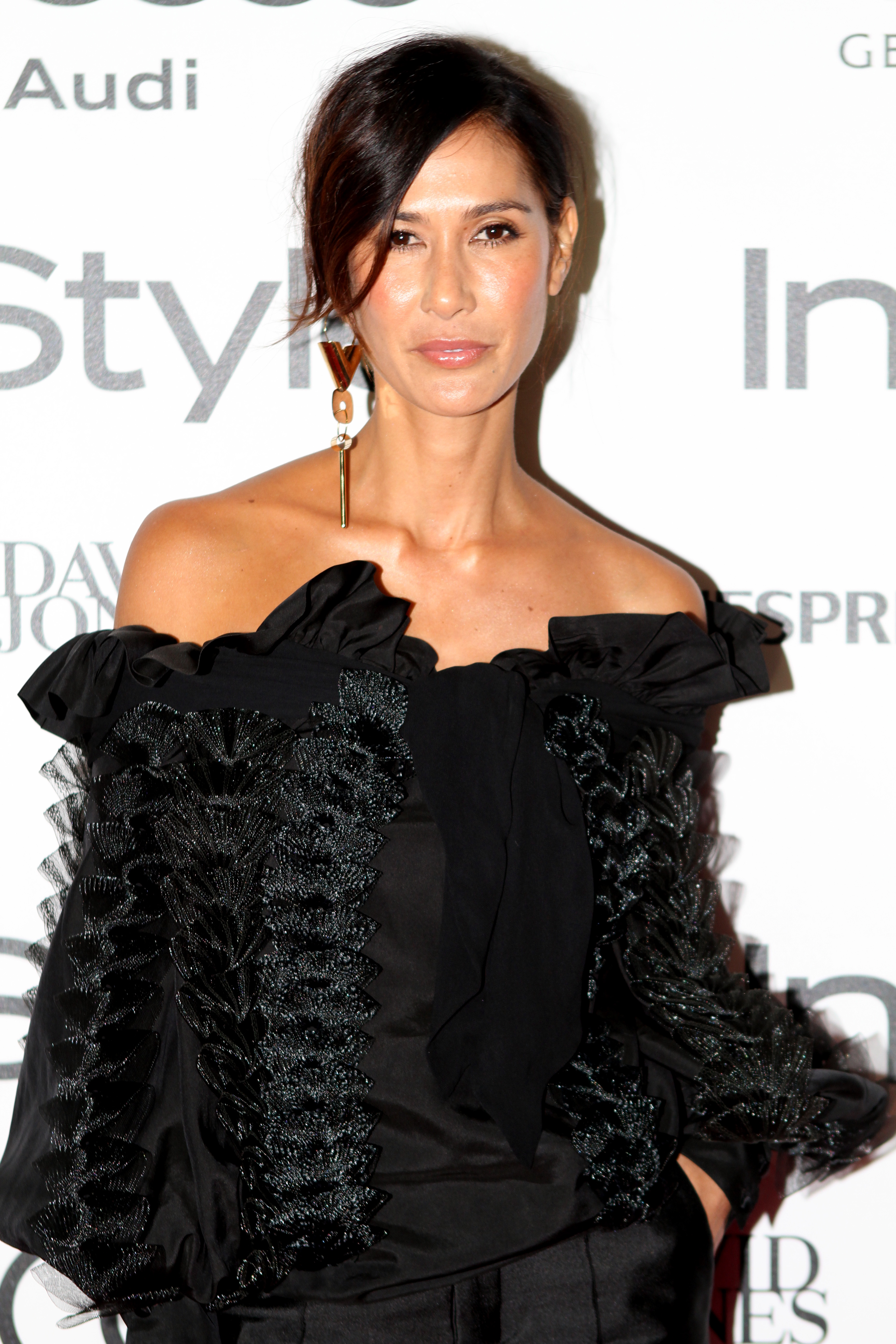
Lindy Klim from The Amazing Race Australia 9

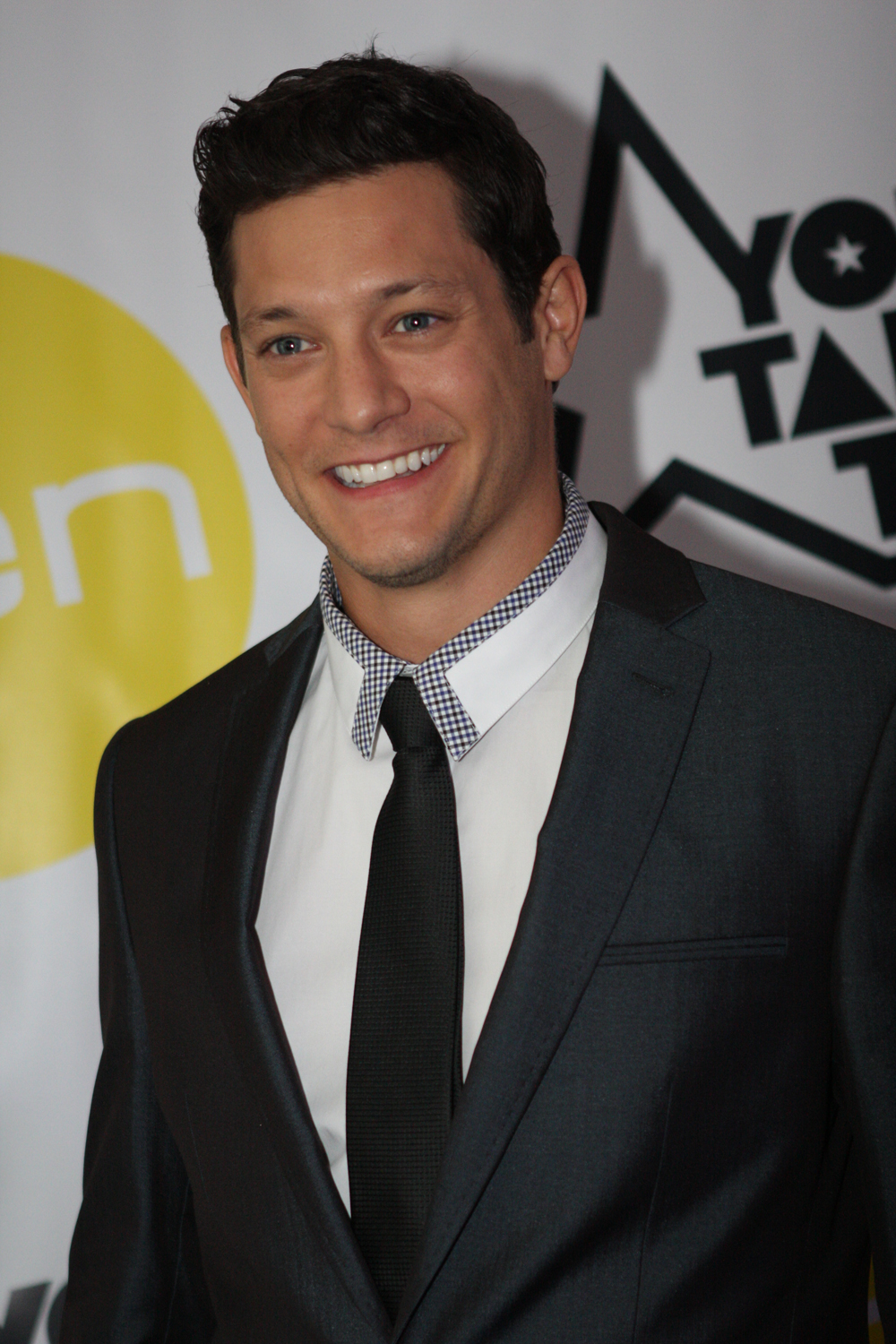
Rob Mills from The Amazing Race Australia 9

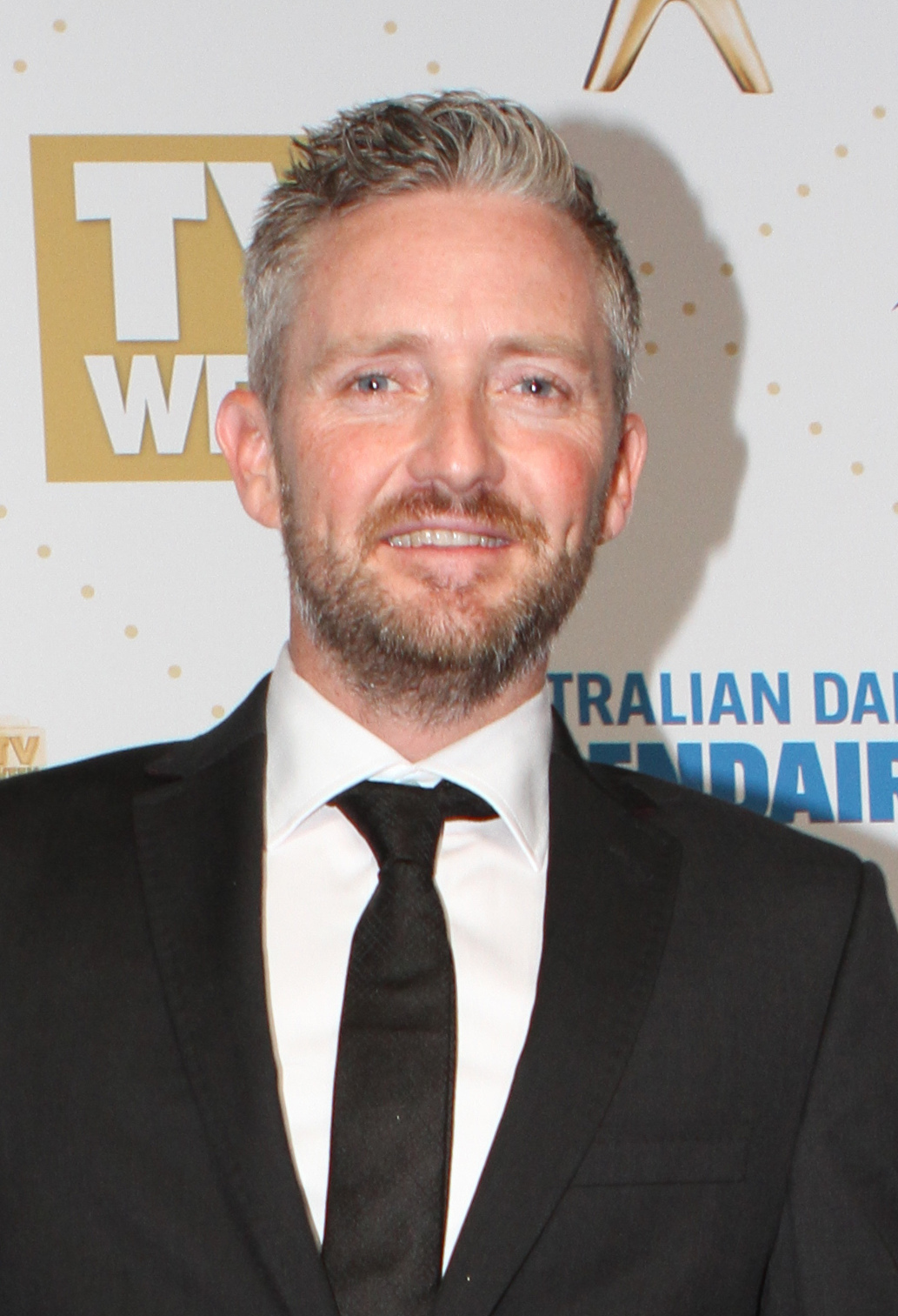
Stephen Curry from The Amazing Race Australia 9

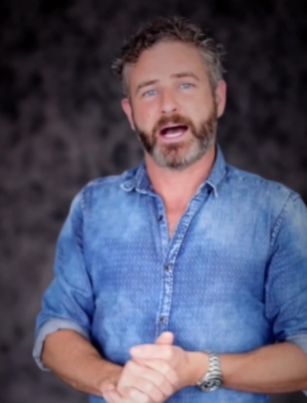
Bernard Curry from The Amazing Race Australia 9
