= Elizabeth Grant (anthropologist) =

Australian architect and anthropologist (1963–2022)

Elizabeth Grant CF
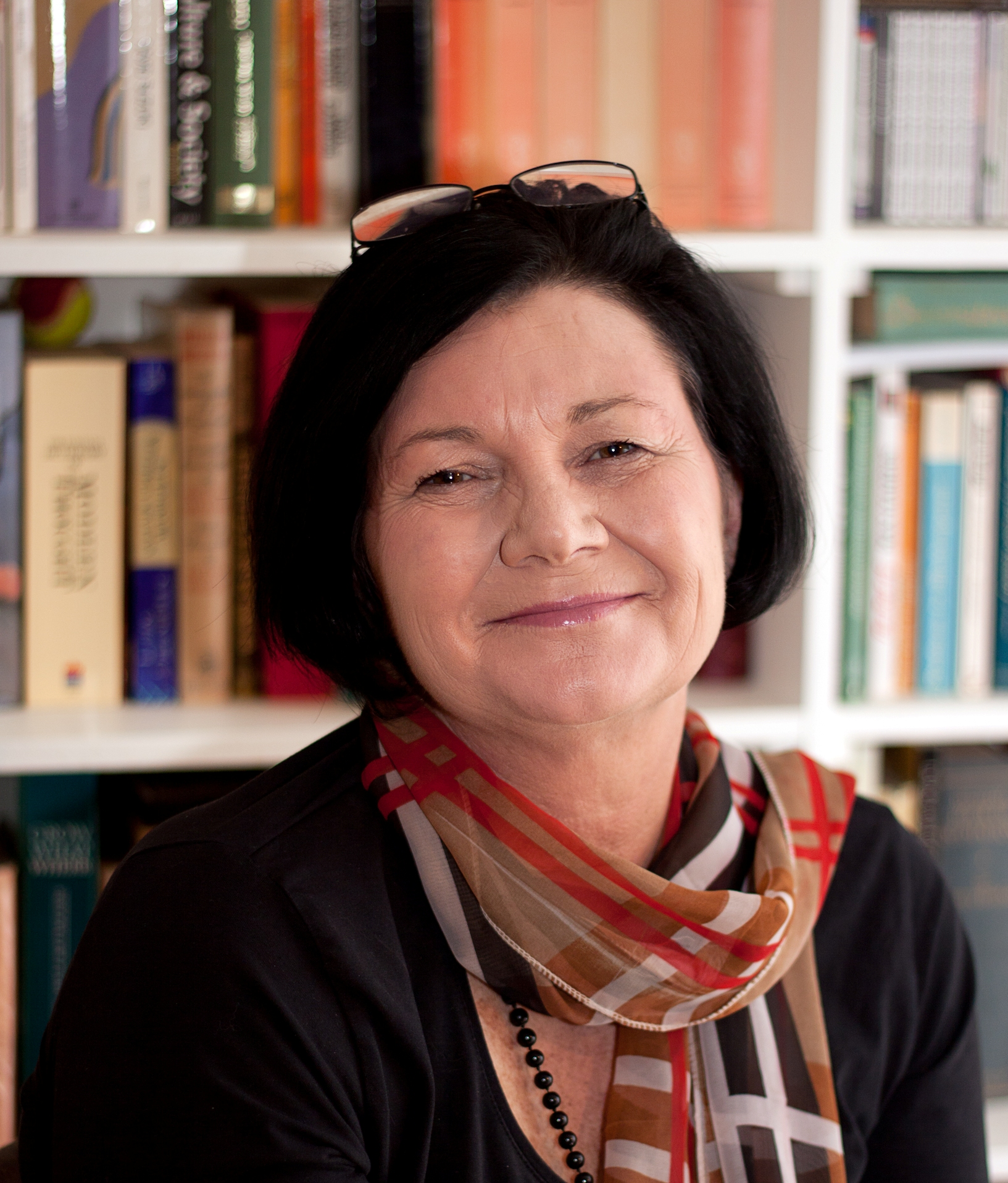
- Born: 23 August 1963; Mount Gambier, South Australia, Australia
- Died: 5 July 2022 (aged 58); Clayton Bay, South Australia, Australia
- Education: The University of Adelaide
- Known for: Architectural researcher, anthropologist, criminologist and academic
- Spouse: Leonard Cohen
- Children: 3
- Awards: Churchill Fellowship
- Scientific career
- Fields: Architecture, Indigenous architecture Human Rights
- Workplaces: RMIT School of Architecture and Design
- Website: Official website

Elizabeth Grant CF (23 August 1963 – 5 July 2022) was an Australian architectural anthropologist, criminologist and academic working in the field of Indigenous Architecture. She was a Churchill Fellow and held academic positions at the University of Adelaide, as Associate Professor of Architecture and Urban Design at RMIT University's RMIT School of Architecture and Design, Adjunct Professor at the University of Canberra and the University of Queensland. She researched, wrote, and was an activist focused on architecture and design with Indigenous peoples as architectural practice and a social movement, and the observance of human rights in institutional architecture (in particular reforms to prison, custodial and court architecture). Her expertise in Indigenous housing and homelessness, design for Indigenous peoples living with disability, and indigenising public places and spaces made her a regular guest on the Australian Broadcasting Corporation's Radio National and ABC Local Radio. She wrote and reviewed architectural projects for architectural magazines such as Architecture Australia, the journal of the Australian Institute of Architects, and the Australian Design Review.

== Career ==
Grant specialised in the research and design of buildings and environments in the field of Indigenous architecture. She promoted the design of humane, culturally appropriate architecture that fits the needs of Indigenous users, to participate in the recognition of the unjust treatment of Indigenous Australians, and to dignify contemporary Indigenous cultures through architectural excellence.

Much of her work examined the design of humane institutional architecture (in particular, prison, custodial and court architecture) and housing for Indigenous people living with a disability. She contributed to Government Inquiries, Coronial Inquests and Royal Commissions, including the Royal Commission into the Protection and Detention of Children in the Northern Territory to have the conditions of custody and housing improved for Aboriginal peoples, and the segregation and isolation of children detained by the State prohibited.

Grant carried out research on the design of public architecture for Aboriginal and Torres Strait Islander peoples, and her work led to changes in the way prisons, courts, pre-schools and other environments are designed for Indigenous users nationally and internationally. Her research on the design of prisons for Indigenous prisoners was highly significant and led to new standards and guidelines for the design of custodial environments for Indigenous prisoners. This body of research was recognised by the International Corrections and Prisons Association and honoured in their 2015 awards. Grant was awarded a Churchill Fellow and investigated the design of correctional facilities for Indigenous prisoners in the United States, New Zealand, Canada and Denmark for her fellowship. She was a visiting scholar and senior research fellow at a number of universities including The University of Cambridge and The University of Queensland. Her research builds on work of the Royal Commission into Aboriginal Deaths in Custody, of which key recommendations are yet to be actioned.

Grant was a member of the design teams on architectural projects, including Taikurrendi Aboriginal Children and Family Centre, Gabmididi Manoo Aboriginal Children and Family Centre, Ngura Yadurirn Aboriginal Children and Family Centre, Northern Territory Secure Facilities PPP Project, Royal Adelaide Hospital Redevelopment Project, Eastern Goldfields Regional Prison Project and South Australian Prison Project.

Grant also worked with historians to examine built environments and the treatment of Australian Indigenous peoples in the colonial era. As part of joint research, the myth that a 1500 year old boab tree located near Derby, Western Australia, known as the Boab Prison Tree, Derby was used as a place of incarceration for Aboriginal peoples was dispelled. Grant found that the Derby boab tree was never used as an Aboriginal prison, a holding area or as a staging point, and there was no evidence that anyone had ever been imprisoned in the tree. An article featuring the Derby boab tree dispelling the fictitious stories was featured in the National Geographic. Other historical work included research into the use of chains and restraints in the policing and imprisonment of Australian Aboriginal peoples.

Grant edited The Handbook of Contemporary Indigenous Architecture (Springer Publishing) co-editing it with prominent scholars, Kelly Greenop from the University of Queensland, Albert Refiti from the Auckland University of Technology and Daniel Glenn, the Principal of Seattle-based, 7 Directions Architecture. The handbook provides the first comprehensive international overview of significant contemporary Indigenous architecture, practice, and discourse, showcasing established, and emerging authors and practitioners from Australia, Aotearoa, New Zealand, the Pacific Islands, Canada, United States and other countries. The foreword for the handbook was written by internationally acclaimed Canadian architect, Douglas Cardinal (Métis, Blackfoot/Kainai Algonquin).

Grant was a member of the Australian Creative Team (Tristan Wong, Jefa Greenaway, Aaron Puls and Jordyn Milliken) for the 17th Venice Architecture Biennale (originally to be held in 2020), but deferred until 2021 due to the COVID pandemic. The exhibit entitled 'In Between' highlights the potential of architecture to build cultural understandings between First Nations Peoples and others with a focus on Australia, Aotearoa New Zealand and other Pacific neighbours, addressing the overarching theme set by Hashim Sarkis titled “How will we live together?”

== Education ==
Grant was awarded an undergraduate degree in architecture from the University of Adelaide and was a collegian at St Ann's College during her studies. Grant later studied and was awarded a Graduate Diploma and a master's degree in Environmental Studies.

Her master's thesis examined the development of Aboriginal housing at Oak Valley after land rights were granted under Maralinga Tjarutja Land Rights Act. She conducted extended periods of fieldwork at Oak Valley and Yalata, living with traditional owners and senior women, resulting in lifelong professional and personal relationships with Maralinga Tjarutja and Yalata Aṉangu which continued to influence her thinking, professional practice and scholarly development. She is recognised as an Indigenous knowledge holder, and continued to work with traditional owners and others on projects to increase equity and further self-determination.

She was awarded a Doctor of Philosophy in Architecture from the University of Adelaide for her thesis entitled 'Towards safer and more congruent environments for Aboriginal Prisoners.' The doctoral thesis examined Aboriginal people's preference for prison environments as a mechanism to reduce negative behaviours such as self-harming and deaths in custody in prison environments, the first empirical study of its type.

== Personal life ==
Grant was born and raised in Mount Gambier spending considerable periods of her childhood with her maternal grandparents and the extended Eames family in Sea Lake, Victoria. Her German immigrant father, Berthold Enderl valued education highly due to interrupted schooling and experiences growing up during World War II in Regensburg, Bavaria and encouraged his children to study and work hard. He stated "education is the only thing that cannot be taken away from you." Grant is the niece of the Erster Bürgermeister of Regensburg (1952–59), Hans Herrmann. Her education was encouraged and supported by his wife, Johanna Enderl, and Grant became the first family member to complete secondary education and attend university.

Grant lived in Adelaide and Melbourne and was married to New Zealand-born, Māori, bluegrass musician, Leonard (Tamahae) Cohen, (Te Whānau-ā-Apanui) a founding member of the Hamilton County Bluegrass Band and other bands. Grant has three sons. She appeared with her eldest son, lawyer and economist, Todd Grant, on the third season of The Amazing Race Australia.

Grant died on 5 July 2022.
