= Hamilton County Bluegrass Band =

New Zealand bluegrass band

The Hamilton County Bluegrass Band is a long-running New Zealand bluegrass band. They have been performing since the 1960s.

== History ==
The Hamilton County Bluegrass Band was founded in Hamilton by Alan Rhodes and Paul Trenwith. Their main influence was the music of Lester Flatt and Earl Scruggs from the Blue Grass Boys. Dave Calder, who was studying at the University of Auckland, liked the sound and became their mandolin player. The called themselves Muleskinners and started performing in 1966. Classical violinist Colleen Bain met the group in 1967 and joined the band as its fiddle player. Leonard Cohen and Sandy McMillin, joined to complete the lineup.

After producer Bryan Easte saw them performing at folk festivals and local music venues he invited them on to his television show, “The Country Touch.” This forced them to decide on a name and eventually Hamilton County Bluegrass Band was chosen. Their first album, self titled, was released in 1967, and their first successful single was "Barefoot Nellie"/"I'll Never Hold You in My Arms Again". Four further albums were released in 1968 and 1969, the last featuring Bill Clifton.

Capitalising on their success the Hamilton County Bluegrass Band turned professional in 1968, signing on with His Master's Voice. McMillin was replaced by Lyndsay Bedogni. In 1970 their single "Carolina on My Mind"/"Roll Muddy River" was a finalist in the Loxene Golden Disc Awards. A year later the "Hey Boys"/"Proud Mary" single also made it into the finals. These two singles were included on the Fifth Season album. Leonard Cohen and Lyndsay Bedogni decided to pursue other interests and to leave the band, and Miles Reay (bass) joined. Cohen emigrated to Adelaide, Australia continued playing bluegrass, concentrating on the dobro in bands such as Old South and Crooked Road. In 1970, the band performed at Redwood 70, the first major modern music festival held in New Zealand.

In 1971, Hamilton County Bluegrass Band released Live At The Wynyard Tavern. The band changed to the Columbia label and released two singles, "You"/"Gentle Ways of Loving Me" and "Mercedes Benz"/"Old Times (It's Easy to Forget)". Calder then left for England and Graham Lovejoy became the new mandolin player.

They also were convinced to relocate to Australia and regularly toured with iconic Australian country musician, Slim Dusty. The Hamilton County Bluegrass Band also travelled to the US in the 1970s. They recorded "For you" and “Kersbrook Cottage” in Sydney under Columbia.

In 1974 the band decided it was time to slow down and moved back to New Zealand. They still appeared on "Country Road" occasionally and released an album titled after the show. In 1975 they recorded one of their signature songs "Orange Blossom Special". Paul and Colleen, now husband and wife, left not long after. This effectively ended the band, although a final album called Orange Blossom Special was released in 1978.

Paul and Colleen Trenwith recorded four albums under their names between 1976 and 1986.

In 1993, a 25th Anniversary compilation called 1968 to 1973 was released. The album Encore came out in the late 1990s. In the band were Alan, Colleen, Paul, Dave Calder, and Colleen and Paul's son Jeremy. This line-up played periodically from 1994 to 2001. In 2002 a very best of compilation was released, which contained tracks mainly from the Fifth Season and Kersbrook Cottage albums. The Hamilton Country Bluegrass Band was inducted into New Zealand's country music Hands of Fame in 2015 and in 2016 Paul received the Queens Service Medal for his services to country music.

Hamilton County Bluegrass Band are still producing music and in 2017 their album These Old Hands was a finalist for Best Country Music Album at the Golden Guitar awards.

On 24 January 2021 Colleen Bain (Trenwith) died from pancreatic cancer in her hometown in New Zealand.

=== Original line-up ===
- Alan Rhodes (Guitar / Banjo / Mandolin / Vocals)
- Paul Trenwith (Banjo / Vocals)
- Dave Calder (Mandolin / Guitar / Vocals)
- Colleen Bain [Trenwith] (Fiddle)
- Leonard Cohen (Mouth Harp / Guitar / Dobro / Vocals)
- Sandy McMillin (String Bass)

== Awards ==
=== Country Music Awards of Australia ===
The Country Music Awards of Australia (CMAA) (also known as the Golden Guitar Awards) is an annual awards night held in January during the Tamworth Country Music Festival, celebrating recording excellence in the Australian country music industry. They have been held annually since 1973.

Year	Nominee / work	Award	Result
1973	"Ring-a-Ding"	Instrumental Track of the Year	Won
1974	Live At Tamworth	EP of the Year	Won

- Note: wins only
