= Oud Metha (Dubai Metro) =

Metro station in Dubai, UAE

Oud Metha عود ميثاء

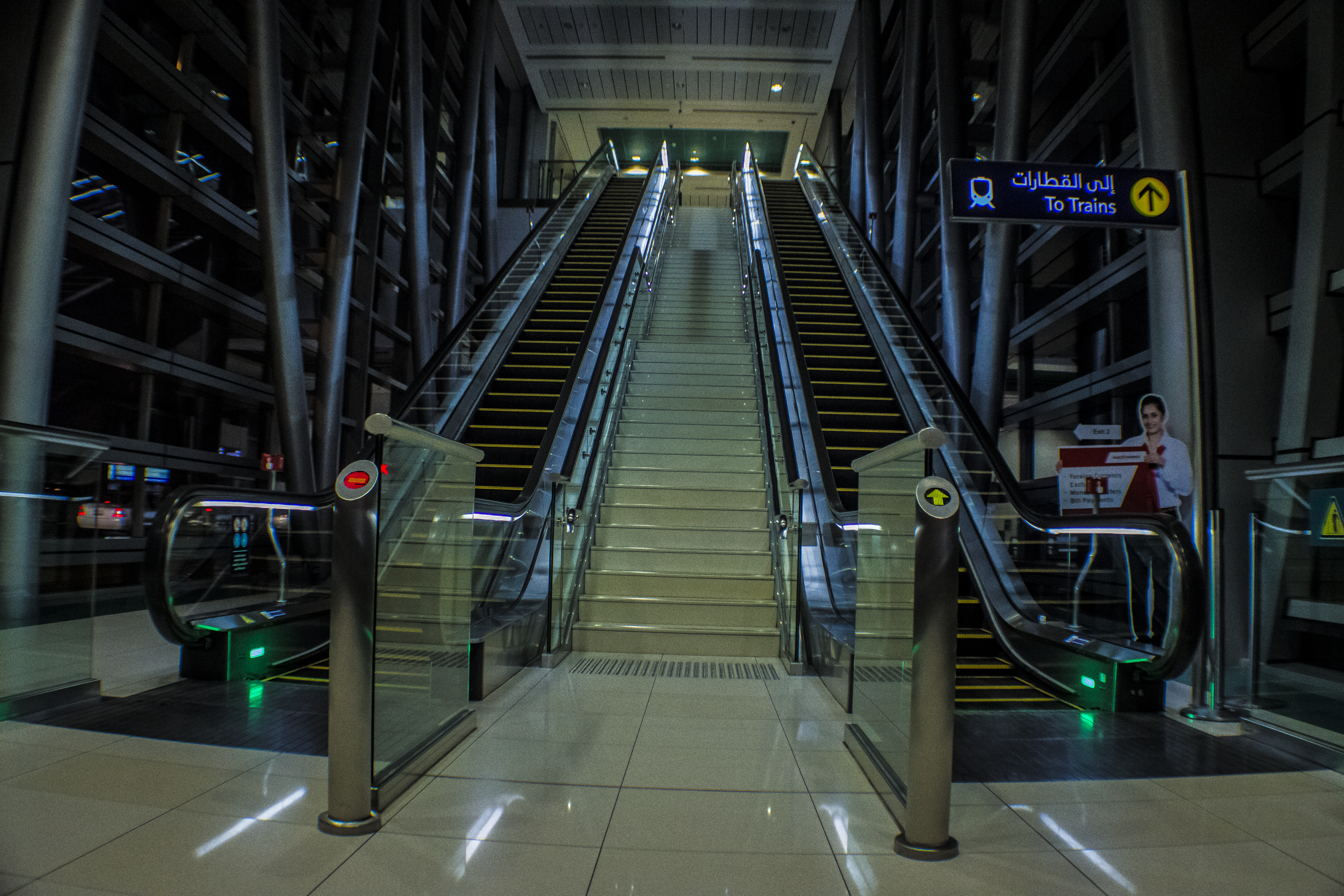
- Station entrance in 2015

General information
- Location: Oud Metha Road; Oud Metha, Dubai; UAE
- Coordinates: 25.2436°N 55.3160°E
- System: Metro Station
- Operator: Dubai Metro
- Line: Green Line
- Platforms: 2
- Tracks: 2
- Connections: RTA Dubai: 6 Al Ghubaiba Stn. - Dubai Healthcare City; 26 Oud Metha Stn. - Business Bay Stn.; 44 Al Ghubaiba Stn. - Al Rashidiya Stn.; 61D Nad Al Shiba, Clinic - Al Ghubaiba Bus Stn.; 66 Al Ghubaiba Stn. - Al Faqa; 67 Al Ghubaiba Stn. - Dubai Endurance City; F18 Oud Metha MS. - Lamcy Plaza; C4 Gold Souq Stn. - Government Workshop; C18 Shaikh Rashid Colony - Oud Metha MS.; X23 Al Ghubaiba Stn. - International City; X25 Al Karama Stn. - Dubai Outsource City; E16 Sabkha Stn. - Hatta Stn.

Other information
- Station code: 27

History
- Opened: September 9, 2011

Services
Preceding station	Dubai Metro	Following station
Dubai Healthcare City towards Creek	Green Line	BurJuman towards e&
Location

Oud Metha (Arabic: عود ميثاء) is a rapid transit station on the Green Line of the Dubai Metro in Dubai, UAE, serving Oud Metha and Umm Hurair.

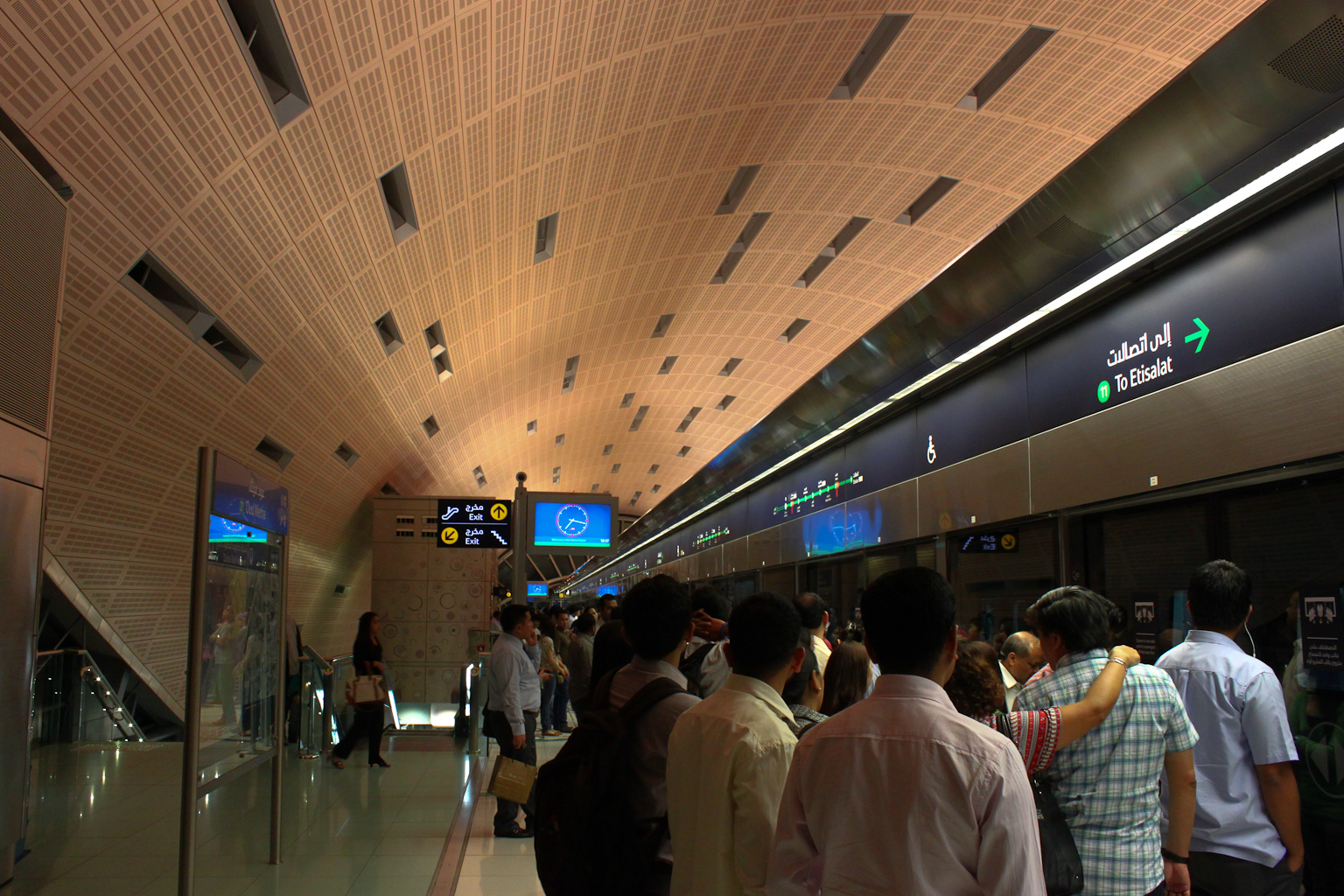
Station interior in 2013

The station opened as part of the Green Line on 9 September 2011. It is close to The Indian High School, Dubai and the Dubai English Speaking School junior school site for 3–11 year olds, other Schools, hospitals, and popular attractions like the Dubai Frame, Zabeel Park are nearby Iranian Club Dubai. Oud Metha Metro Station is a station on the Green Line of the Dubai Metro, located in the Oud Metha area of Dubai and the station is close to popular landmarks such as Wafi Mall, Lamcy Plaza, and Dubai Healthcare City. It also provides easy access to nearby schools, cultural centers, and religious institutions, including St. Mary's Catholic Church and the Iranian Club.

== Station Layout ==
G	Street level	Exit/Entrance
L1	Concourse	Automatic Fare Collection gates, station agent, crossover
L2	Side platform | Doors will open on the right
L2	Platform 1 Westbound	Towards ← E& Next Station: BurJuman; Change at the next station for M1
L2	Platform 2 Eastbound	Towards → Creek; Next Station: Dubai Healthcare City
L2	Side platform | Doors will open on the right

== See also ==
- Al Nasr, Dubai
