= Al Jaddaf =

Al Jaddaf الجداف
- Community
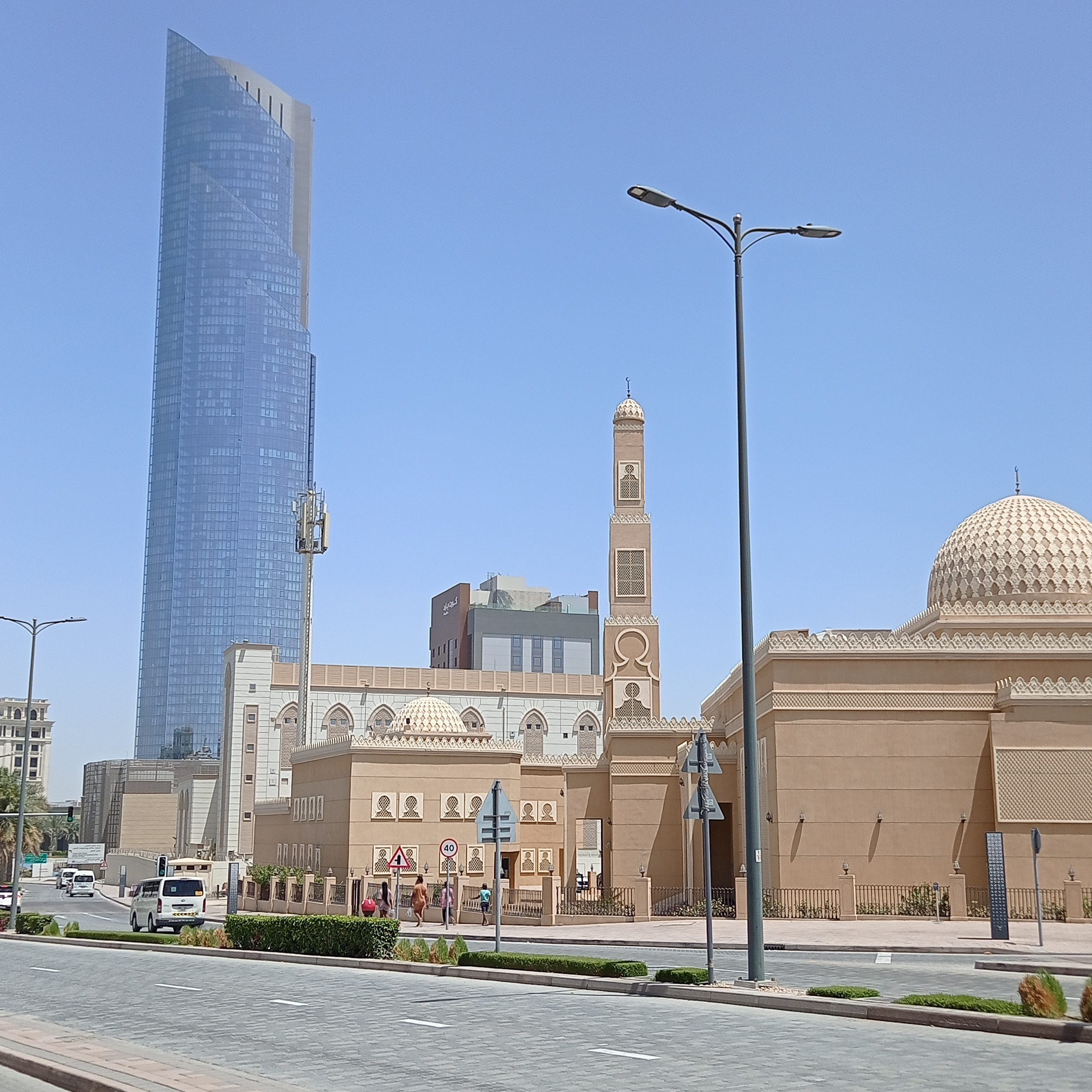
- Sheikha Athija Bint Saqer Al Nahyan Mosque in al-Jaddaf, Dubai

- Location in Dubai Location in United Arab Emirates
- Coordinates: 25.214338°N 55.325775°E
- Country: United Arab Emirates
- Emirate: Emirate of Dubai
- City: Dubai

Area
  - Total: 7.3 km^{2} (2.8 sq mi)

Population (2000)
  - Total: 2,990
  - Density: 410/km^{2} (1,100/sq mi)
- Community number: 326

Al Jaddaf (Arabic: الجداف), also spelled Al Jadaf, is a locality in Dubai, United Arab Emirates (UAE). Located in western Dubai in Bur Dubai, Al Jaddaf is bordered to the north and east by the Dubai Creek, to the south by Zabeel, and to the west by Umm Hurair 2.

Historically, Al Jaddaf, which literally means The Rower, was used as a dhow building area and is also the location of the Dubai Ship Docking Yard (Jadaf). Its shipyards are today a site for the building and maintenance of these traditional boats, and Dubai Maritime City is also a site where dhow boats are repaired. Al Jaddaf also houses the sports grounds and facilities of Al Wasl FC and Dubai Officers Club. Another important landmark is Al Wasl hospital – now named as Latifa hospital.

New developments in the area include Dubai Culture Village (a.k.a. Jaddaf Waterfront), a zoned community dedicated to visual, performing and literary arts, and the second phase of Dubai Healthcare City. This area is still developing into a hotel hub with up to five hotels at present in construction and three hotels built, namely Marriott Al Jadaf, Reflection Hotel Apartments and Arabian Park Hotel. The area is also being developed as a residential location, with more than three residential apartments.

Al Jaddaf has two metro stations, Creek (near the Al Jaddaf Marine Station on Dubai Creek) and Al Jadaf station, both on the Green Line of the Dubai Metro, which is controlled by the Dubai Road and Transport Authority (RTA).

As of 2017, there is a large dhow being constructed in the area, intended to break the world record for size currently held by Kuwait.

Also located on Dubai Creek is the Mohammed Bin Rashid Library.

== Jaddaf Waterfront ==
The Jaddaf Waterfront (a.k.a. Culture Village) is a development in Al Jaddaf, located on Dubai Creek. It covers an area of around three million square metres (32,000,000 sq ft) and includes cultural and exhibition centres, a dockside development, and a harbour. There are commercial, residential, and retail districts. Projects include a Sculpture Park, the D1 tower (based on the Q1 building on the Gold Coast in Queensland, Australia), Manazel Al Khor, and Palazzo Versace Dubai.

== See also ==
- Al Jaddaf Marine Station
- Al Jadaf (Dubai Metro)
- Creek (Dubai Metro)
