= List of countries with Jollibee outlets =

Map of Current locations of Jollibee stores around the world

International presence of Jollibee stores: Current locations Former locations Planned locations No current or planned locations

This is a list of countries with Jollibee franchises. This list only includes the Jollibee fast food chain brand of Jollibee Foods Corporation (JFC) and excludes other brands owned by the company.

As of November 2024, Jollibee operates over 1,300 stores in the Philippines and 400 elsewhere.

As reported in a 1990 article in The Washington Times, Jollibee had two locations in Taiwan and one in Brunei along with 58 locations in the Philippines.

According to a 1995 article in the Wall Street Journal, Jollibee had five locations in Brunei, two in Jakarta, Indonesia, and one in Dubai in the United Arab Emirates along with 160 locations in the Philippines.

By the end of 2011, Jollibee had 31 locations in Vietnam, 27 in the United States, 11 in Brunei, 7 in Saudi Arabia (all in Jeddah), and 1 each in Hong Kong and Qatar along with 747 locations in the Philippines.

== Summary ==
No.	Country/territory	Date of first store	First outlet location	Current number of outlets (date of source)	Notes
1	Philippines	June 1978	Cubao, Quezon City	1,151 (February 2024)	The first ever Jollibee branch was in Cubao, Quezon City which opened in 1975 as a Magnolia Ice cream parlor. When Jollibee was incorporated in 1978, there were 7 branches in Metro Manila. The first franchised outlet of Jollibee opened in Ronquillo Street, Santa Cruz, Manila in 1979. The fast food chain's first outlet outside Luzon was in Cagayan de Oro in Mindanao. The store opened in 1991 at the Limketkai Commercial Complex. The 100th branch in the Philippines opened in Davao City in 1991 while its 500th store opened in Basilan in 2004. There were 954 Jollibee branded restaurant locations in the Philippines officially recorded to be operating during November 2016. The 1,000th Jollibee store in the country at the Bonifacio Global City was opened in 2017. By the end of 2019, Jollibee had 1,200 stores in the Philippines. As of May 2025, Jollibee operates 1,779 stores, 1,293 of which are in the Philippines.
2	Singapore	January 12, 1985	Katong	26 (November 2025)	Jollibee's first overseas location opened at Roxy Square in 1985, which was operated by Jollibee Foods (Far East) Pte Ltd. However, it was closed a year later after winding up operations. The fast food chain reestablished its presence in Singapore on March 12, 2013. The franchise in this country is jointly owned by Beeworks Inc. and a wholly owned Jollibee subsidiary called Golden Plate Pte. Ltd. As of November 2025, Jollibee has 26 locations on the island city-state.
3	Taiwan	1986	Former location, see below		
4	Brunei	August 22, 1987	Bandar Seri Begawan	22 (May 2026)	Jollibee opened its first outlet at the Utama Bowling Centre in Bandar Seri Begawan.
5	Indonesia	1991	Former location, see below		
6	Kuwait	1994	Kuwait City	4 (November 2016)	Closed in 1999; later reintroduced on February 25, 2012.
7–14	Saudi Arabia	1995	Jeddah	12 (December 2016)	Nesma United Ltd. is the franchise company operating all Jollibee branches in Saudi Arabia. The first branch opened by the franchise company was at the Jeddah International Market in 2008. As of December 2016, there are 12 Jollibee branches in the kingdom with presence in the cities of Al Khobar, Jeddah, Jubail, Riyadh, Taif and Yanbu.
7–14	Bahrain	1995	Manama	1 (November 2018)	First introduced in 1995, reintroduced on September 6, 2015.
7–14	United Arab Emirates	April 1995	Dubai	30 (June 2026)	Jollibee opened its first store in the United Arab Emirates in April 1995 in Dubai but later closed it. In February 2014, it was announced that Jollibee Foods Corporation signed a joint venture agreement with Golden Crown Foods LLC to form a subsidiary company called Golden Plate Pte. Ltd. which was created to operate and own Jollibee stores in the United Arab Emirates. In May 2015, Jollibee returned to the Emirati market by opening a store at the Dubai Mall in Dubai. The following year, a second location was opened in the Mall of the Emirates in February 2016, quickly followed by a third location in BurJuman Centre in April 2016, and a fourth store in Al Ghurair Center opened in August 2016. On 28 December 2016, the first Jollibee outlet in Abu Dhabi opened at the Mushrif Mall.
7–14	Malaysia	c. 1990–1997	Kota Kinabalu, Malaysia	10 (February 2023)	The Filipino chain had previously entered the Malaysian market in the 1990s although it was forced to close its operation in 1997 during the Asian financial crisis. Jollibee only had a single outlet during its 1990s operations in Malaysia which was situated in Sabah. After a 21-year absence, the fast-food eatery returned in Malaysia following the opening of its first outlet in Kota Kinabalu, Sabah, in December 2018. Kota Kinabalu was chosen as their comeback location in the country due to the large Filipino diaspora in the city. In February 2019, the company announced its plan to open over 100 stores in Malaysia in the next 10 years, including 50 stores in Sabah and Sarawak. On February 8, 2022, Jollibee opened its second Malaysian outlet in Petaling Jaya, Selangor, which is also the first outlet to be opened in West Malaysia.
7–14	Guam	January 9, 1996	—N/a	1 (July 2019)	On the island of Guam, a U.S. territory, Jollibee had opened a location there in 1996 but later closed the branch sometime before 2009. A second location was reported to have opened in the Agana Shopping Center in February 2000. There are no records as to when the second location closed, but no Jollibee locations were known to exist on the island of Guam by 2009. It was reported in July 2017, that Jollibee planned to reopen a branch in Guam. Jollibee reestablished its presence on 7 April 2019 by opening an outlet at the Micronesia Mall in Dededo.
7–14	Hong Kong	September 1996	Central District	10 (June 2020)	Jollibee opened its first branch in Hong Kong in 1996 in the Central District when it was still under British administration. The number of outlets in the city which shortly became a Chinese territory grew to five but the fast food brand saw closure of outlets. In 2016, Jollibee started reopening outlets. By December 2017, there are 8 Jollibee outlets in Hong Kong.
7–14	Vietnam	October 1996	Ho Chi Minh City	250 (May 2026)	Vietnam is the only country (besides the Philippines) to have 100 or more Jollibee outlets. The first Jollibee branch in Vietnam was opened in October 1996 at the Superbowl Mall [sic] in Tân Sơn Nhất, Ho Chi Minh City. By 2010, Jollibee had 10 locations in Vietnam, all located in Ho Chi Minh City except for a lone branch located in Biên Hòa City. By the end of 2011, the 30th branch was opened in the Long Biên district of Hanoi. Jollibee had no less than 20 stores in Vietnam as of 2012, with branches in the cities of Ho Chi Minh City, Hanoi, Da Nang, Nha Trang, in the provinces of Vinh Phuc, Dong Nai and in the Mekong Delta Region. By the beginning of 2018, Jollibee opened 100 stores in Vietnam, and its 100th branch opened in Can Tho. By the end of 2024, the 200th store was inaugurated.
7–14	Papua New Guinea	1997	Former location, see below		
15–16	China	1998	Former location, see below		
15–16	United States	June 13, 1998	Daly City, California	72 (January 2024)	The first location in the United States was opened in Daly City, California, on June 13, 1998. The first location in the state of Nevada, and the first U.S. location outside of California and the 12th in the United States, was opened in Las Vegas in May 2007. This was followed by the first outlets in New York, Hawaii, Washington State, Virginia, Texas, Illinois, Florida, Maryland and Arizona. There was going to be a Jolibee in Oregon opened by 2024, but that venture was delayed. It opened in May 2025 in Hillsboro. Puerto Rico has yet to open its first Jollibee outlet.
17	Northern Mariana Islands	December 10, 1999	Former location, see below		
18	Qatar	June 22, 2010	Doha	6 (June 2015)	Sunrise Trading & Foodstuff Co is the franchisee operating all Jollibee branches in Qatar.
19	Canada	December 15, 2016	Winnipeg, Manitoba	29 (January 2024)	In 2015, Jollibee first indicated it would expand to Canada with plans to open the first Canadian branch in Toronto. The first Canadian Jollibee location opened in December 2016 in Winnipeg, Manitoba. The city was chosen as the first Jollibee location by JFC due to it being the Canadian city with the highest density of Filipinos. The location became the 35th in North America, with the other 34 locations in the United States. The first outlet in Toronto opened in Scarborough on April 1, 2018. Jollibee also has opened its first outlet in Alberta and Saskatchewan in 2019. On February 25, 2022, a location opened in Vancouver, British Columbia. In January 2024 the 100th North American Jolibee location opened in Surrey, BC.
20	Oman	May 5, 2017	Muscat	1 (May 2017)	
21	Italy	March 18, 2018	Milan, Lombardy	2 (October 2020)	The first Jollibee outlet in Italy and in whole of Europe opened at the Piazza Diaz 7 in Milan, Italy, on March 18, 2018. Jollibee Foods Corporation's entrance in the European market was a result of a joint venture with Singapore Blackbird Holdings. JFC announced the joint venture in April 2017. Plans to open a Jollibee branch in Italy already existed as early as August 2015 when Jollibee officials met with Milan's Chamber of Commerce to discuss possibilities on opening a branch in the northern Italian city.
22	Macau	June 28, 2018	São Lourenço	4 (May 2024)	The first Jollibee outlet in Macau opened at Circle Square Avenida de Almeida Ribeiro.
23	United Kingdom	October 18, 2018	London, England	12 (August 2023)	Jollibee opened its first UK outlet in Earl's Court, London on October 18, 2018. It opened its first outlet outside of England in July 2021 in Cardiff, Wales, while its first outlet in Scotland opened in February 2022 in Edinburgh.
24	Spain	September 23, 2021	Madrid, Community of Madrid	1 (September 2021)	Jollibee opened its first Spanish outlet in Sol, Madrid on September 23, 2021.

== Former branches ==
Countries and territories formerly with Jollibee outlets in peach

Country/territory	Date of first store	First outlet location	Date of closure of last store	Notes
Taiwan	1986	Taipei	1988	Jollibee had at least two branches in Taiwan.
Papua New Guinea	1997	Port Moresby	—N/a	The sole branch in Port Moresby closed following the publication of a newspaper print advertisement that falsely implied that the local branch was trying to purchase dogs and cats as a source of food. Jollibee was unable to track down those responsible for the ad but had suspected several competitors.
Indonesia	1991	Jakarta	c. 1997	Closed down due to the 1997 Asian financial crisis. Jollibee entered the Indonesian market in 1991 and by 1995 it had three stores in Jakarta and two stores in Medan. The company plans to return to the country and re-establish its presence there.
China	1998	Xiamen, Fujian	2001	Jollibee launched its first mainland China branch in Xiamen in 1998 but later closed in 2001. Jollibee focused on acquiring already popular restaurant chains in China. However, in their drive to expand the company's foreign presence faster, they are now considering returning to the mainland Chinese market.
Northern Mariana Islands	December 10, 1999	Garapan, Saipan	February 2009	Jollibee had two branches on the island of Saipan in the Northern Mariana Islands, a U.S. territory. The first location was opened in the village of Garapan on December 10, 1999. A second location was opened in the village of Chalan Kanoa in January 2000. The Chalan Kanoa branch was closed in 2004 and the main Garapan branch closed in February 2009 due to declining sales.

== Planned locations ==
=== Europe ===
Jollibee had previously targeted opening a branch in Romania in 1995. In 2021, Jollibee was targeting to add 50 stores in Europe in the following five years.

=== Asia Pacific ===
==== Australia and Japan ====
In an October 2015 forum, Jollibee president and CEO Tony Tan Caktiong announced that Jollibee planned to open their first branches in Australia and Japan by 2018. In a signing ceremony on 26 October 2016, Caktiong said that Jollibee might open stores in Japan in 2018. Within the same month, Jollibee secured a partnership with Ise Foods (renamed Tamago & Company Inc) to open a Jollibee outlet in Japan. By October 2017, the projected dates of Jollibee's entrance into the two markets were pushed to 2020.

On 4 April 2022, it was reported that Jollibee will be opening its first Australian branch in Campbelltown, a suburb of Sydney, New South Wales, with pre-construction plans already in progress.

In December 2024, Jollibee's regional business head for Europe, Middle East, Asia and Australia Dennis Flores stated that the initial Campbelltown location opening plan was scrapped due to administrative challenges with their partner developer, but that there is still a plan to open Jollibee's first Australian branch within the next five years, with a high possibility to do so in two.

In November 2026, Australian prime minister Anthony Albanese announced that Jollibee secured two franchise deals in Australia and would be opening 35 stores across New South Wales and Victoria.

==== Others ====
Jollibee also considered reestablishing presence in Indonesia in late 2016 to mid-2017. It also considered reestablishing presence in China. The chain planned to come to Cambodia and Bangladesh at an undisclosed date.
