= Baniyas Square (Dubai Metro) =

Metro station in Dubai, UAE

Baniyas Square بني ياس

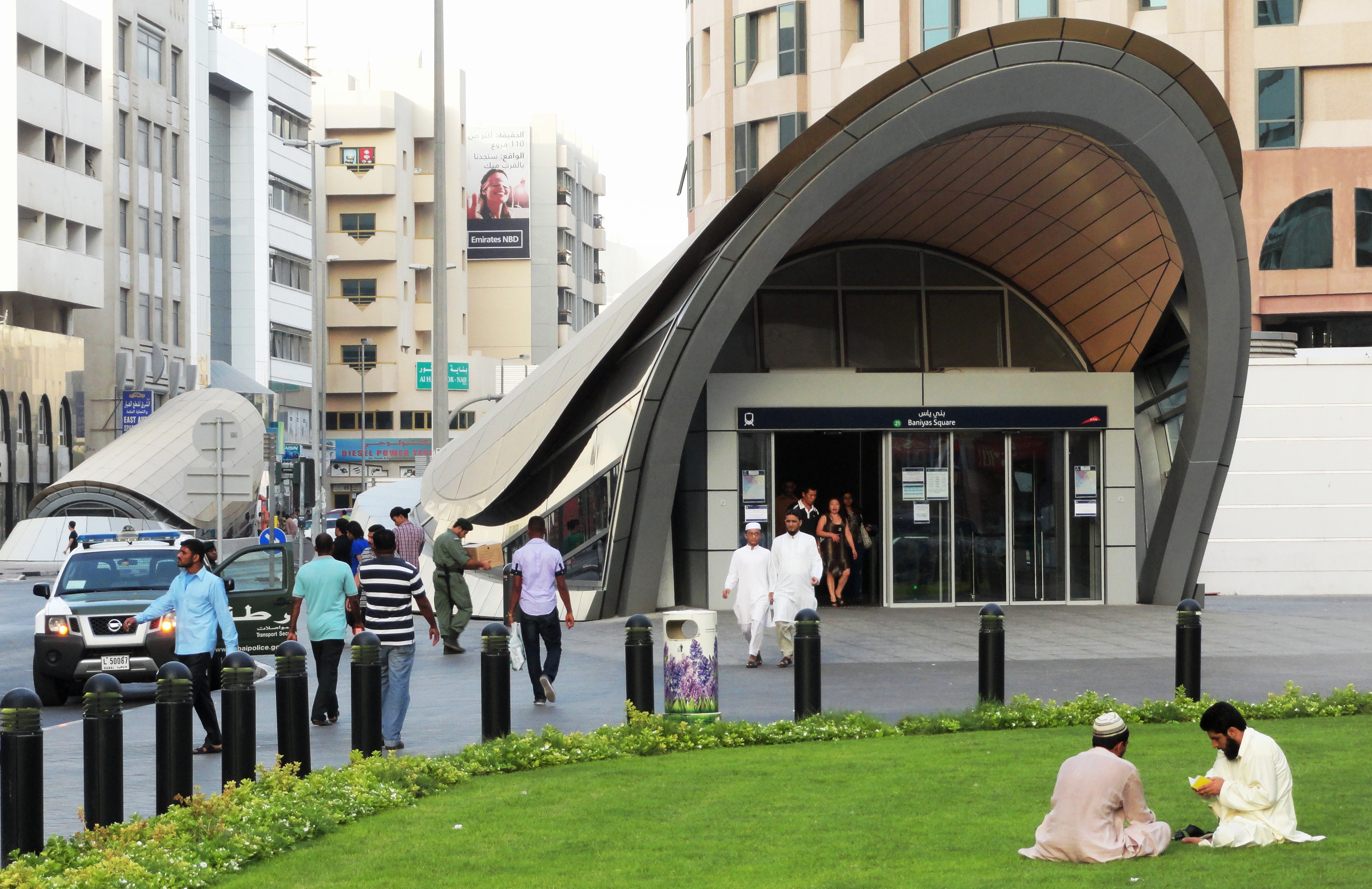
- The station entrance in 2012

General information
- Location: Baniyas Square (27th Street & Al Maktoum Road); Naif, Dubai; UAE
- Coordinates: 25.2692°N 55.3077°E
- System: Metro station
- Line: Green Line
- Platforms: 2 side platforms
- Tracks: 2
- Connections: RTA Dubai: 77 Baniyas Square MS - Airport 3

Construction
- Structure type: Underground
- Accessible: yes

Other information
- Station code: 21
- Fare zone: 5

History
- Opened: 9 September 2011

Passengers
- 2011: 1.070 million

Services
Preceding station	Dubai Metro	Following station
Gold Souq towards Creek	Green Line	Union towards e&
Location

Baniyas Square (Arabic: بني ياس) is a rapid transit station on the Green Line of the Dubai Metro in Dubai, UAE.

== History ==
Opened along with the initial stretch of the Green Line from Etisalat to Dubai Healthcare City stations, trains began calling at Baniyas Square on 9 September 2011. With 1.070 million passengers in 2011, it has become among the busiest stations on the Green Line.

== Location ==
Baniyas Square is located in the central section of Deira in the historic centre of Dubai, under the square of the same name. It is the closest station to the neighbourhood of Naif and the eastern section of Al Sabkha. Nearby points of interest include the Deira Twin Towers and a number of souks. Also close by are Dubai Creek, Al Manal Centre, and the Naif Souk.

== Station layout ==
Like other central stations on the Dubai Metro, Baniyas Square is located below ground level. It lies underneath 27th Street at its intersection with Al Maktoum Road; the tracks then head either further northwest under 27th Street towards Gold Souq or to the southeast under Al Maktoum Road. There are two side platforms with two tracks, a similar setup to most Metro stations.

== Station Layout ==
G	Street level	Exit/Entrance
L1	Concourse	Automatic Fare Collection gates, station agent, crossover
L2	Side platform | Doors will open on the right
L2	Platform 2 Westbound	Towards ← Creek; Next Station: Gold Souq
L2	Platform 1 Eastbound	Towards → E& Next Station: Union; Change at the next station for M1
L2	Side platform | Doors will open on the right
