= BurJuman (Dubai Metro) =

Metro station in the United Arab Emirates

BurJuman برجمان

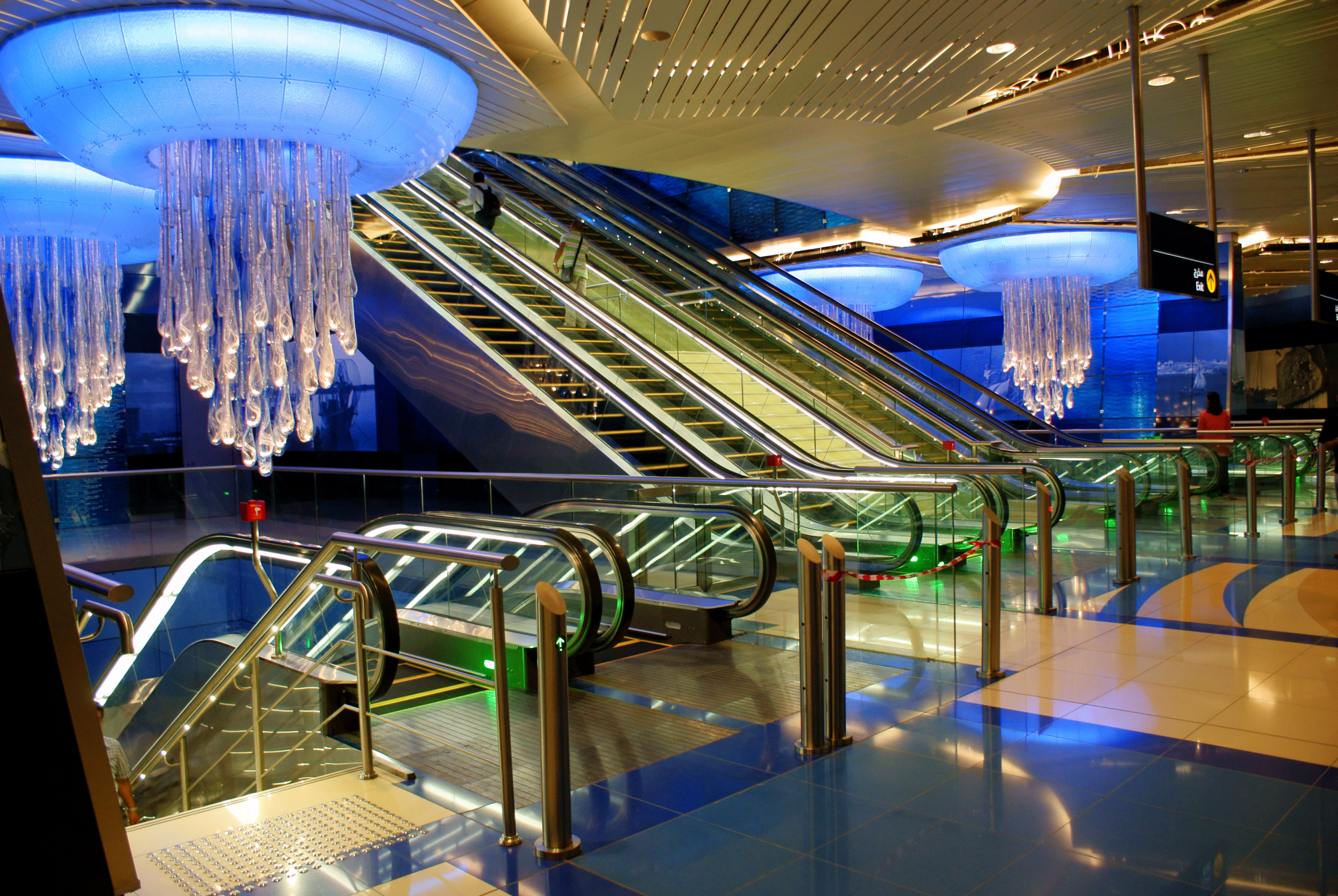
- Escalators at the station

General information
- Location: Sheikh Khalifa Bin Zayed Street & Khalid Bin Al Waleed Road; Al Mankhool; Dubai, United Arab Emirates
- Coordinates: 25°15′17″N 55°18′15″E
- System: Metro Station
- Line: Green Line Red Line
- Platforms: 4 side platforms (2 per level)
- Tracks: 4 (2 per level)
- Connections: RTA Dubai: 21 Al Ghubaiba Stn. - Al Quoz Ind'l Area; 29 Al Ghubaiba Stn. – The Dubai Mall; 33 Al Ghubaiba Stn. – Al Qusais Stn; 44 Al Ghubaiba Stn. – Al Rashidiya Stn.; 61 Al Ghubaiba Stn. – Ras Al Khor, Samari Res.; 61D Al Ghubaiba Stn. – Nad Al Shiba Clinic; 66 Al Ghubaiba Stn. – Al Faqa; 67 Al Ghubaiba Stn. – Dubai Endurance City; 91 Al Ghubaiba Stn. – Jebel Ali Stn.; C3 Al Karama Stn – Abu Hail Stn.; C5 Gold Souq Stn. – Al Ghubaiba Stn.; C10 Hamriya Port – Mercato Mall; C18 Shaikh Rashid Colony – Lamcy Plaza; F70 Oud Metha Stn – Burjuman MS.; X23 Gold Souq Stn. – Int'l City; X25 Al Karama Stn. – Dubai Outsourcing

Construction
- Structure type: Underground
- Accessible: yes

Other information
- Station code: 19 (Red Line); 26 (Green Line)
- Fare zone: 6

History
- Opened: September 9, 2009
- Former names: Khalid Bin Al Waleed

Services
Preceding station	Dubai Metro	Following station
Oud Metha towards Creek	Green Line	Sharaf DG towards e&
ADCB towards Expo 2020 or Life Pharmacy	Red Line	Union towards Centrepoint
Location

BurJuman (Arabic: برجمان, formerly Khalid Bin Al Waleed) is a rapid transit station serving the Red and Green Lines of the Dubai Metro in Dubai, UAE. It is one of two transfer stations between the two lines, the other being Union. Since it began service, over 15.611 million passengers have used BurJuman station, making it the second-busiest station of the Dubai Metro network. Beyond this station, both of these metro lines go elevated.

== History ==
One of the first stations of the Dubai Metro, BurJuman opened as Khalid Bin Al Waleed (Arabic: خالد بن الوليد) on 9 September 2009 as part of the initial stretch of the Red Line from Rashidiya to Nakheel Harbour and Tower along with seven other intermediate stations. On November 13, 2012, the station was renamed after the BurJuman shopping centre, located outside Exit 3 of the station. The station walls are decorated with pictures of Dubai's rich history of fishing and pearl diving. The jellyfish-shaped chandeliers were designed by Czech designer Jitka Kamencova Skuhrava.

On March 17–23, 2019, the station hosted a music festival. On March 16–22, 2022, the station hosted the 2nd edition of the festival. On March 6–12, 2023, the station hosted the 3rd edition of the festival.

== Location ==
BurJuman station is located in Bur Dubai, below the BurJuman shopping centre, after which it is named. Specifically, it lies below the intersection of Sheikh Khalifa Bin Zayed Street and Khalid Bin Al Waleed Road. It is the closest station to a number of consulates, including those of Canada, Egypt, India and the United Kingdom. The station is also close to Al Seef (including a Marine Transport Station on Dubai Creek) and Al Karama.

== Station layout ==
Along with Union, BurJuman is one of only three interchange stations on the Dubai Metro, giving it an unconventional layout and making it among the largest in the system. The Red Line travels under Sheikh Khalifa bin Zayed Street, crossing perpendicularly with the Green Line, which lies below Khalid Bin Al Waleed Road. The Red and Green Lines both utilise two side platforms with two platforms on differing levels.

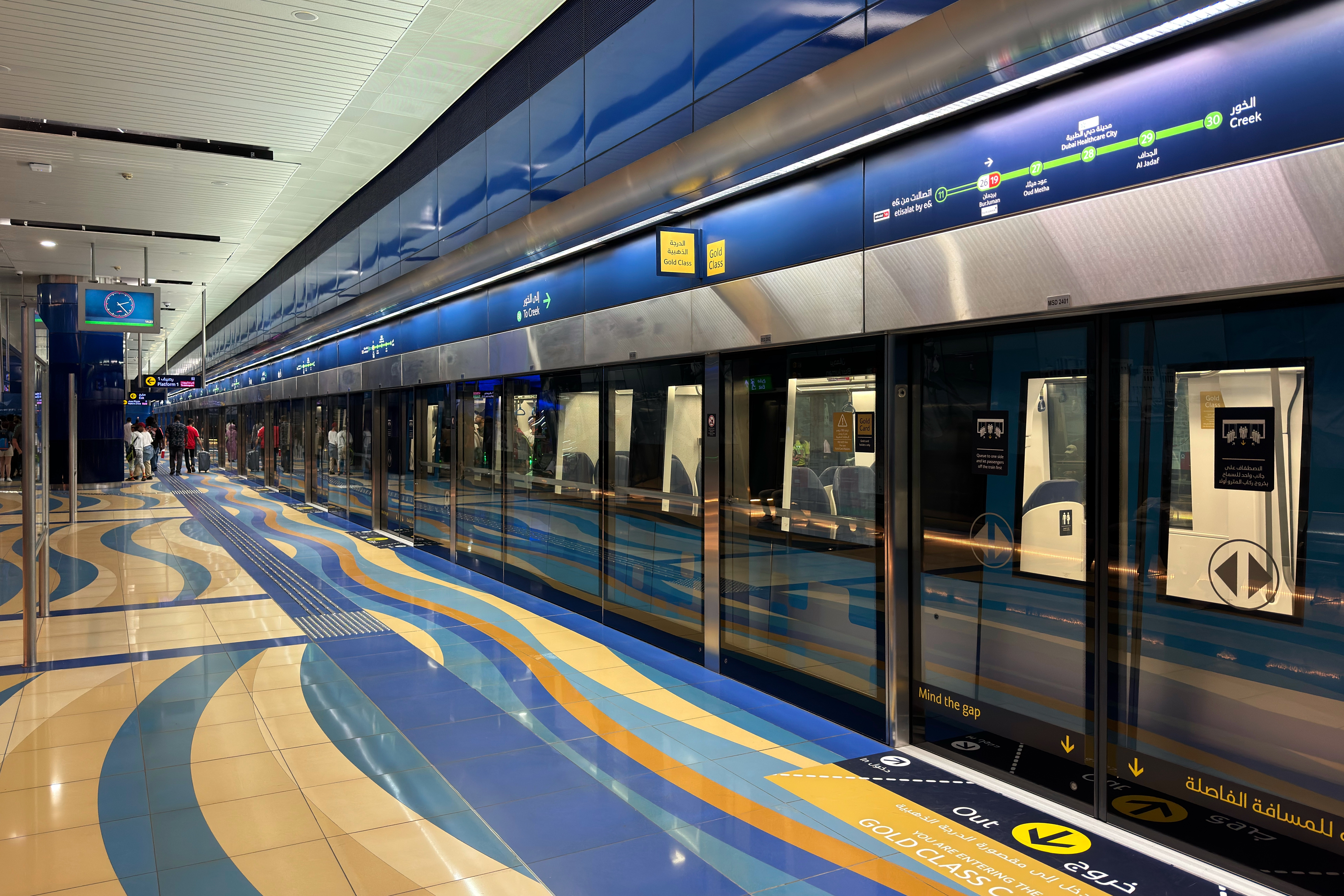
Platform 4

Platforms were originally not assigned numbers, but instead given names according to the direction of the train. This changed on December 17, 2020, where platforms in all stations were now numbered.

G	Street level	Exit/Entrance
M	Mezzanine	Automatic Fare Collection gates, station agent, crossover
UG Level-1	Side platform | Doors will open on the right
UG Level-1	Platform 2 Southbound	Towards ← Life Pharmacy / Expo 2020; Next Station: ADCB
UG Level-1	Platform 1 Northbound	Towards → Centrepoint; Next Station: Union; Change at the next station for M2
UG Level-1	Side platform | Doors will open on the right
UG Level-2	Side platform | Doors will open on the right
UG Level-2	Platform 3 Westbound	Towards ← E& Next Station: Sharaf DG
UG Level-2	Platform 4 Eastbound	Towards → Creek; Next Station: Oud Metha
UG Level-2	Side platform | Doors will open on the right
