= Grand Hyatt Dubai =

Hotel in United Arab Emirates

Coordinates: 25°13′42″N 55°19′39″E

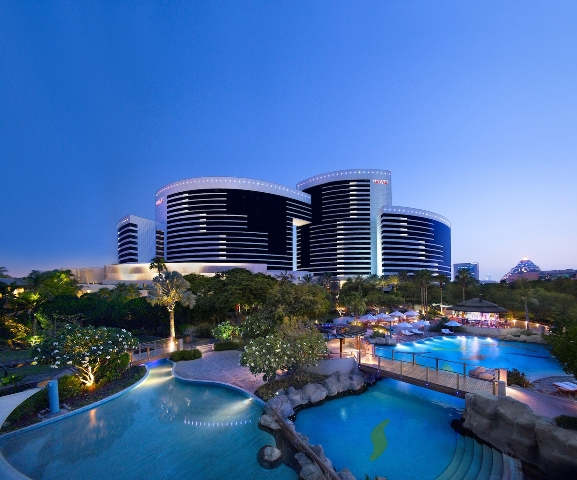
- Grand Hyatt Dubai Hotel
- Interactive map of the Grand Hyatt Dubai area

General information
- Location: Dubai, United Arab Emirates
- Opening: 16 March 2003
- Owner: Wasl Asset Management Group
- Operator: Hyatt Hotels Corporation

Other information
- Number of rooms: 710
- Number of restaurants: 12

Website
- http://dubai.grand.hyatt.com

Grand Hyatt Dubai is a luxury five-star hotel located in the Bur Dubai district of Dubai, United Arab Emirates. Situated in the Dubai Healthcare City area near Dubai Creek, the hotel is renowned for its extensive resort-style facilities, lush landscaped gardens, and panoramic views of the city skyline and historic creek. Managed by Hyatt, Grand Hyatt Dubai is one of the flagship properties in the Middle East region.

The hotel lobby has an indoor rainforest, which, according to an Economist travel writer, had mixed results in injecting atmosphere.

== Location ==
The hotel is located in the Bur Dubai area, close to Dubai Healthcare City and just a 10-minute drive from Dubai Airport. It is strategically positioned near several of Dubai’s major tourist attractions, including the Dubai Frame, Dubai Creek, Wafi Mall, and Zabeel Park. The Dubai Metro is within walking distance of the hotel.

== Accommodation ==
Grand Hyatt Dubai offers 710 rooms and suites, all of which are elegantly appointed and equipped with modern amenities. Many rooms offer views of the city skyline, the hotel's gardens, or Dubai Creek. The hotel is also equipped to accommodate guests with special needs, offering accessible rooms and facilities for those using wheelchairs.

== Dining ==
The hotel features over 12 dining venues, serving a wide range of cuisines including Italian, Japanese, Indian, Lebanese, and international buffets. Notable restaurants and outlets include:

- Andiamo – Italian restaurant with a garden terrace.
- Peppercrab – Singaporean seafood dining.
- The Collective by Market Café – An international buffet with live cooking stations.
- iZ – Authentic North Indian cuisine.
- Wox – Southeast Asian street food-inspired restaurant.
- Cooz Bar – Jazz bar and cocktail lounge.

== Event Spaces ==
Grand Hyatt Dubai offers a total of 11,500 square meters of indoor and outdoor event space for conferences, exhibitions, and social gatherings. At the heart of its offerings is the state-of-the-art Conference and Exhibition Centre, which spans 5,000 square meters of flexible, multi-purpose facilities. The Baniyas Ballroom boasts 3,212 square meters of function space, accommodating up to 2,500 guests, while the Al Ameera Ballroom features 840 square meters of pillar-less space and can accommodate up to 800 guests. For smaller meetings and breakout sessions, the hotel features 14 versatile meeting rooms, including the residential-style Al Manzil. Al Manzil is a uniquely designed space that reflects Arabic hospitality and architectural elements, offering a more intimate and creative alternative to traditional meeting venues. Additionally, the hotel boasts three outdoor venues with over 2,000 square meters of landscaped event lawns, ideal for open-air receptions and special occasions.
