= Dubai Healthcare City (Dubai Metro) =

Metro station in Dubai, UAE

Dubai Healthcare City مدينة دبي الصحية

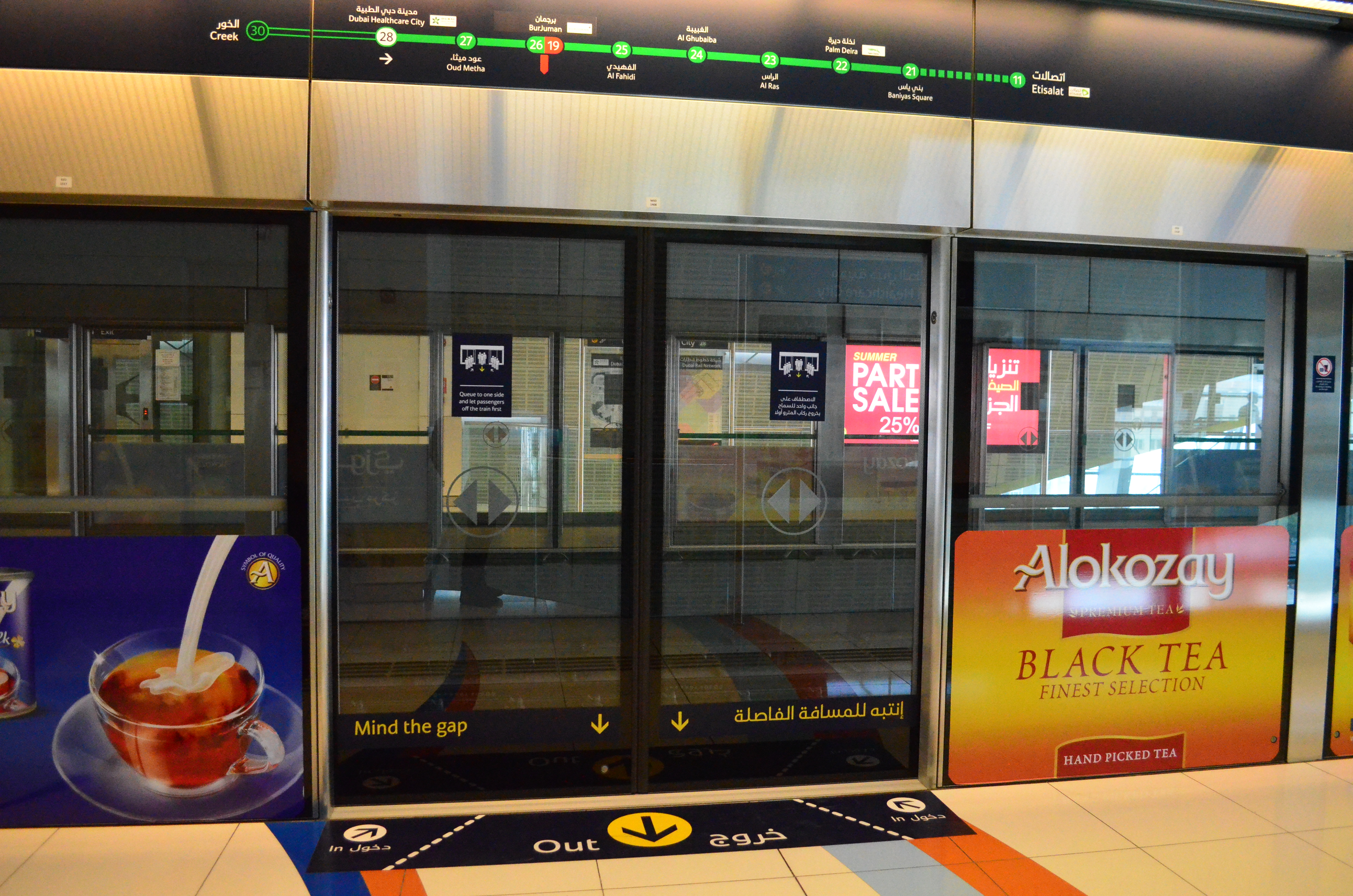
- View on the platform

General information
- Location: Dubai Healthcare City; Umm Hurair Second, Dubai; UAE
- Coordinates: 25.2309°N 55.3229°E
- System: Metro Station
- Operator: Dubai Metro
- Line: Green Line
- Platforms: 2
- Tracks: 2
- Connections: RTA Dubai: 6 Al Ghubaiba Stn. - Dubai Healthcare City

Other information
- Station code: 28
- Fare zone: 6

History
- Opened: September 9, 2011

Services
Preceding station	Dubai Metro	Following station
Al Jadaf towards Creek	Green Line	Oud Metha towards e&
Location

Dubai Healthcare City (aka Dubai Health Care City and Healthcare City, Arabic: مدينة دبي الصحية) is a rapid transit station on the Green Line of the Dubai Metro in Dubai, UAE, serving Dubai Healthcare City.

The station opened as part of the Green Line on 9 September 2011. The Green Line was extended beyond this station to connect Al Jadaf and Creek stations on 1 March 2014.

The station is close to Wafi City, the Wafi Mall, the Khan Murjan Souk, Creek Park, Dubai Children's City, and the Dubai Dolphinarium.

== Station Layout ==
G	Street level	Exit/Entrance
L1	Concourse	Automatic Fare Collection gates, station agent, crossover
L2	Side platform | Doors will open on the right
L2	Platform 1 Westbound	Towards ← E& Next Station: Oud Metha
L2	Platform 2 Eastbound	Towards → Creek; Next Station: Al Jaddaf
L2	Side platform | Doors will open on the right

== See also ==
- Wafi City
