= Sharaf DG (Dubai Metro) =

Rapid transit station on the Green Line in Dubai, UAE

Sharaf DG شرف دي جي

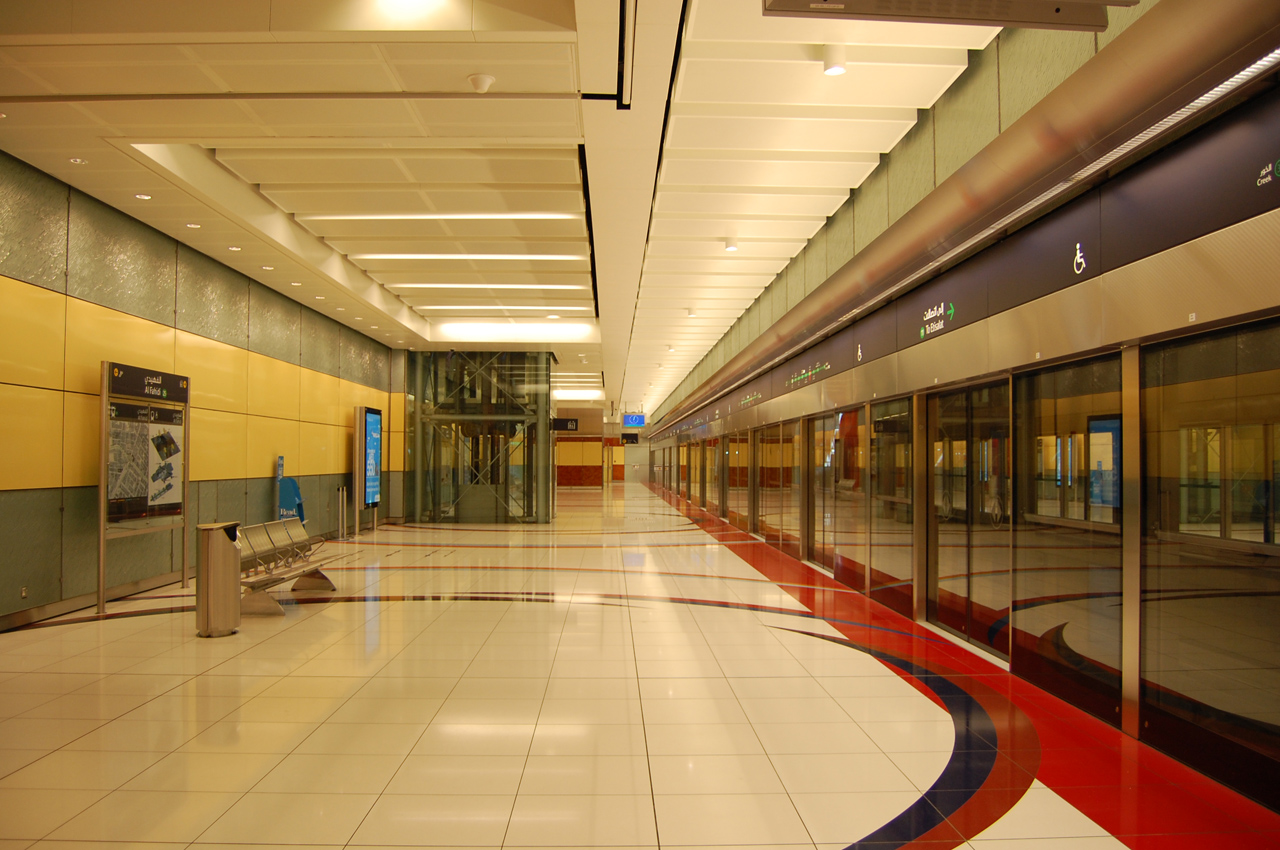
- Platform view

General information
- Location: Khalid bin Waleed Road & Al Mankhool Road; Al Mankhool, Dubai; UAE
- Coordinates: 25.2582°N 55.2974°E
- System: Metro Station
- Line: Green Line
- Platforms: 2 side platforms
- Tracks: 2
- Connections: RTA Dubai: 6 Al Ghubaiba Stn. - Dubai Healthcare City; 15 Al Ghubaiba Stn. - Al Khail Gate; 21 Al Ghubaiba Stn. - Al Quoz; 29 Al Ghubaiba Stn. - Dubai Mall; 33 Al Ghubaiba Stn. - Al Qusais Stn.; 44 Al Ghubaiba Stn. - Al Rashidiya Stn.; 61 Al Ghubaiba Stn. - Ras Al Khor, Samari Residence.; 61D Al Ghubaiba Stn. - Nad Al Shiba, Clinic; 66 Al Ghubaiba Stn. - Al Faqa; 67 Al Ghubaiba Stn. - Dubai Endurance City; 83 Al Ghubaiba Stn. - Al Khail MS; 91 Al Ghubaiba Stn. - Jebel Ali Stn.; C1 Satwa Stn. - Airport 3; C3 Abu Hail Stn. - Al Karama Stn.; C5 Gold Souq Stn. - Al Ghubaiba Stn.; C18 Shaikh Rashid Colony - Oud Metha MS.; X2 Union Stn. - Satwa Stn.; X23 Al Ghubaiba Stn. - International City

Construction
- Structure type: Underground
- Accessible: yes

Other information
- Station code: 25
- Fare zone: 6

History
- Opened: 9 September 2011
- Former names: Al Fahidi

Services
Preceding station	Dubai Metro	Following station
BurJuman towards Creek	Green Line	Al Ghubaiba towards e&
Location

Sharaf DG (Arabic: شرف دي جي, formerly Al Fahidi) is a rapid transit station on the Green Line of the Dubai Metro in Dubai, UAE.

== Location ==
Located at the edge of the historic core of Dubai, Sharaf DG station lies underneath the intersection of Khalid bin Waleed Road and Al Mankhool Road. Nearby attractions include the Grand Mosque, the Dubai Museum, and numerous hotels. It is also close to Al Seef (with a Marina Transport Station on Dubai Creek), the Old Textile Souk, and the Sheikh Mohammed Centre for Cultural Understanding.

== History ==
Sharaf DG station was renamed from Al Fahidi on 24 November 2020. Mashreq station was formerly called Sharaf DG until 18 May 2020.

Sharaf DG station opened along with the initial stretch of the Green Line on 9 September 2011, with trains running from Creek to Etisalat. In December 2012, the RTA announced that Al Fahidi saw the highest ridership of all Green Line stations since opening in 2011, with 5.232 million passengers.

== Station layout ==
As with other stations in Dubai's historic centre, Sharaf DG is an underground station, with tracks and platforms situated below Khalid bin Waleed Road. There are two side platforms and two tracks, with access to the station from all four corners of Khalid bin Waleed Road's intersection with Al Mankhool Road. Sharaf DG's colour scheme is characterised by the use of bright red tiles, symbolising the element of fire; other Dubai Metro stations take inspiration from fire as well as air, water and earth.

G	Street level	Exit/Entrance
L1	Concourse	Automatic Fare Collection gates, station agent, crossover
L2	Side platform | Doors will open on the right
L2	Platform 1 Westbound	Towards ← E& Next Station: Al Ghubaiba
L2	Platform 2 Eastbound	Towards → Creek; Next Station: BurJuman; Change at the next station for M1
L2	Side platform | Doors will open on the right
