= BurJuman =

- بر جمان
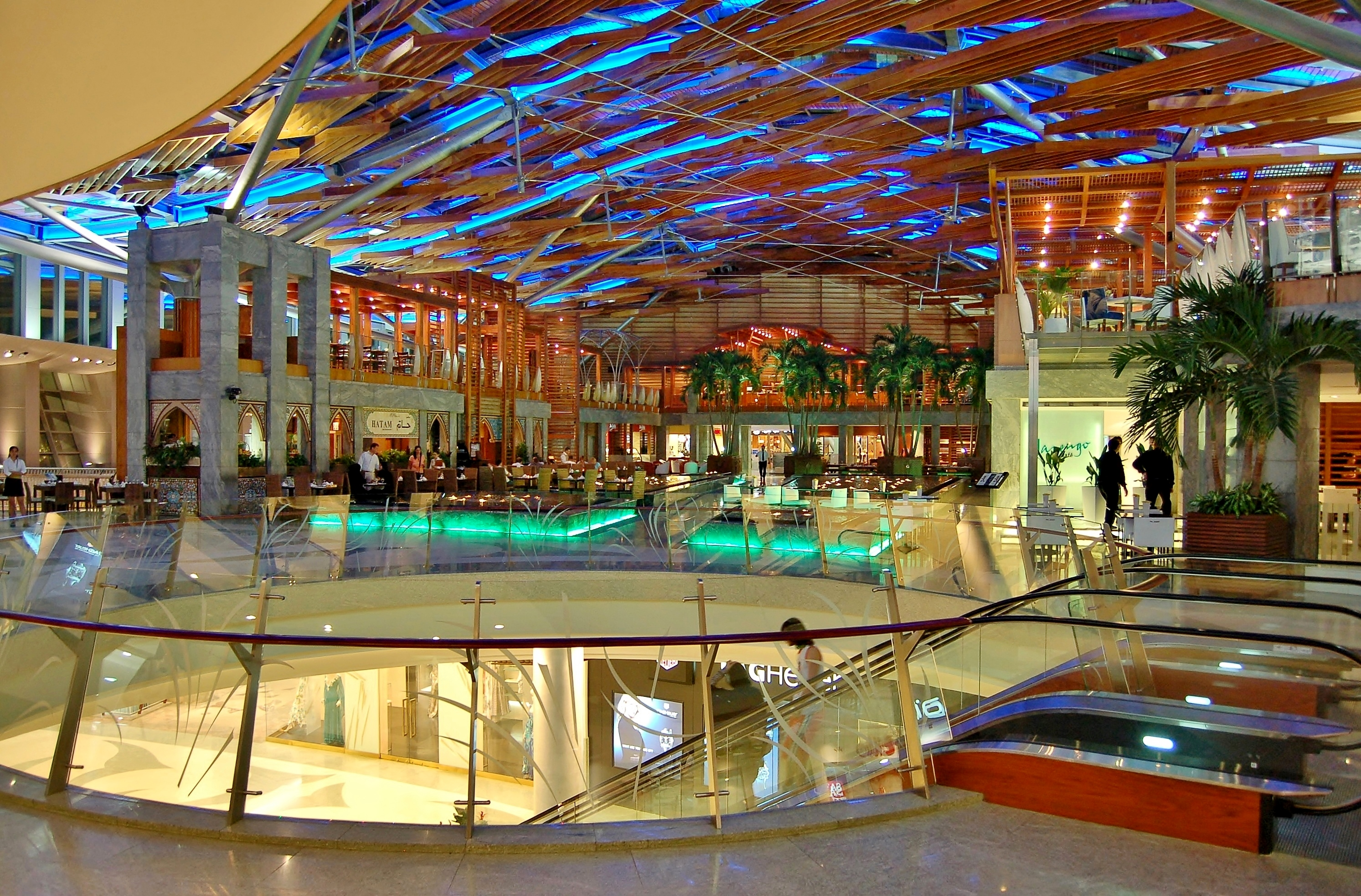
- Location: Dubai, United Arab Emirates
- Coordinates: 25°15′11″N 55°18′7″E
- Address: BurJuman Centre, Al Mankhool, Bur Dubai, Sheikh Khalifa Bin Zayed Street
- Opened: 4 November 1991; 35 years ago (renovated on 11 August 2014; 12 years ago)
- Developer: Al Ghurair Group
- Owner: Al Ghurair Group
- Architect: HEric R Kuhne & Associates, Kohn Pedersen Fox Associates PC
- Num. of stores: 320
- Floor area: 1,000,000 sq ft (93,000 m^{2}) (after renovation)
- Floors: 4
- Parking: 3,200 spaces
- Public transit: Burjuman Metro Station Red Line Green Line Bus routes: 21, 29, 33, 42, 44, 61, C5, C10
- Website: burjuman.com

BurJuman (Arabic: بر جمان) is one of the oldest shopping malls in Dubai, in the residential area of Bur Dubai, in Dubai, United Arab Emirates. It is developed and owned by Al Ghurair Group. The distinctive landmark comprises over 2.8 million square feet of mixed-use space including the shopping mall, business tower, hotel suites and duplex residences. The mall comprises over 800,000 sq ft (74,000 m^{2}).

In November 2003, BurJuman won 2 MAXI Merit awards from The International Council of Shopping Centers. In March 2006, BurJuman was awarded the "Chammak Mall of the Year" award at the prestigious 1st Retail Middle East Awards.

== Retail anchors ==
BurJuman houses over 300 retail stores.

=== Carrefour ===
On 21 August 2014, a 5,780 square metre Carrefour hypermarket was opened at the remodeled North Wing. Carrefour will serve as a key anchor tenant in BurJuman.

== Dining ==
Burjuman houses over 40 restaurants and cafés.

== Metro link ==
The BurJuman Metro Station entrance, which is near the North Wing, offers visitors a close and convenient link to the mall.

=== Naming rights ===
In December 2012, RTA and BurJuman officially renamed Khalid Bin Al Waleed Station to BurJuman Station under the Dubai Metro “Naming Rights Initiative”.

== History ==
The North Wing section of the mall opened to the public on 5 November 1991, making it one of the oldest malls in Dubai. The mall used to comprise 500,000 sq ft (46,000 m^{2}).

The South Wing opened to the public in the spring of 2007, extending the area from 500,000 sq ft (46,000 m^{2}) to 800,000 sq ft (74,000 m^{2}). By March 2013, the North Wing had been closed for renovation. Carrefour hypermarket was opened in the newly renovated section of the mall in August 2014.

=== Expansion ===
In 2002, Burjuman announced a AED 500 million (US$135 million) project of the expansion of the mall's North Wing. The project included the construction of the South Wing, a 26-storey luxury residential apartment building, a 23-storey hotel building, and a 30-storey office tower. Construction started in 2004. It was completed in late 2006 and the South Wing of the mall was open to the public in early 2007.

=== The BurJuman Business Tower ===
The BurJuman Business Tower, which is the tallest tower in the area, is adjacent to the BurJuman Mall. It is a 30-storey tower, of which 22 floors are used for office purpose.

=== The BurJuman Residence ===
The BurJuman Residence is in the vicinity of the BurJuman Mall. It was designed by the New York/London based architectural firm Kohn Pedersen Fox (KPF). The building comprises 80 duplex apartments, 10 townhouses and five penthouses. The residential tower incorporates eight meeting rooms, an underground car park with 200 spaces, gym and swimming pool. BurJuman Residence was opened for tenants in July 2006.

=== BurJuman Arjaan by Rotana Hotel ===
The BurJuman Arjaan by Rotana was located within the vicinity of the BurJuman mall and also next to the Burjuman Residence. As of April 2024, it is now closed and being replaced by BurJuman Vista, now converting the old hotel for residential use.

=== Renovation ===
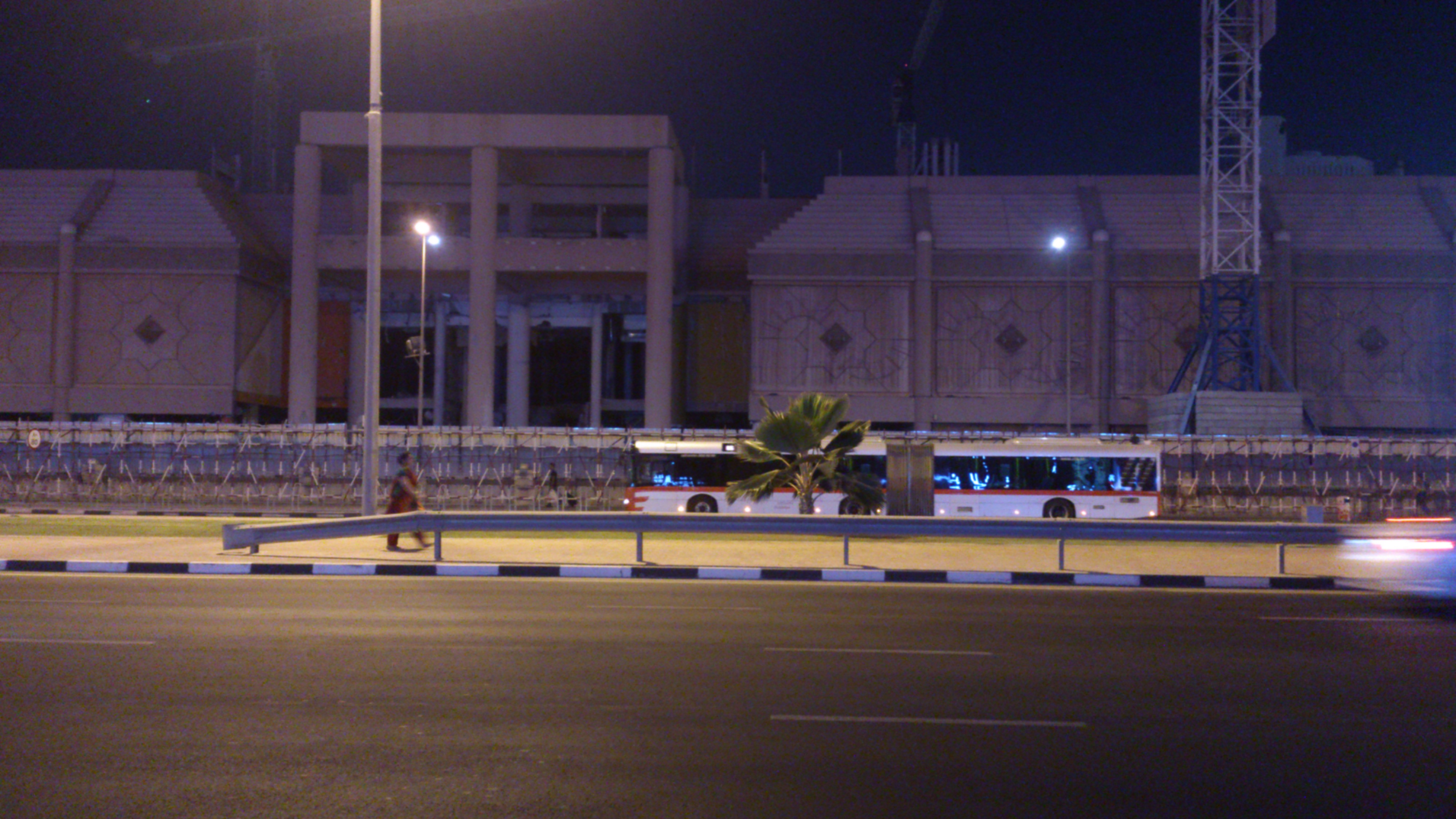
The North Wing section of the mall is closed for renovation and redesign. (July 2013)

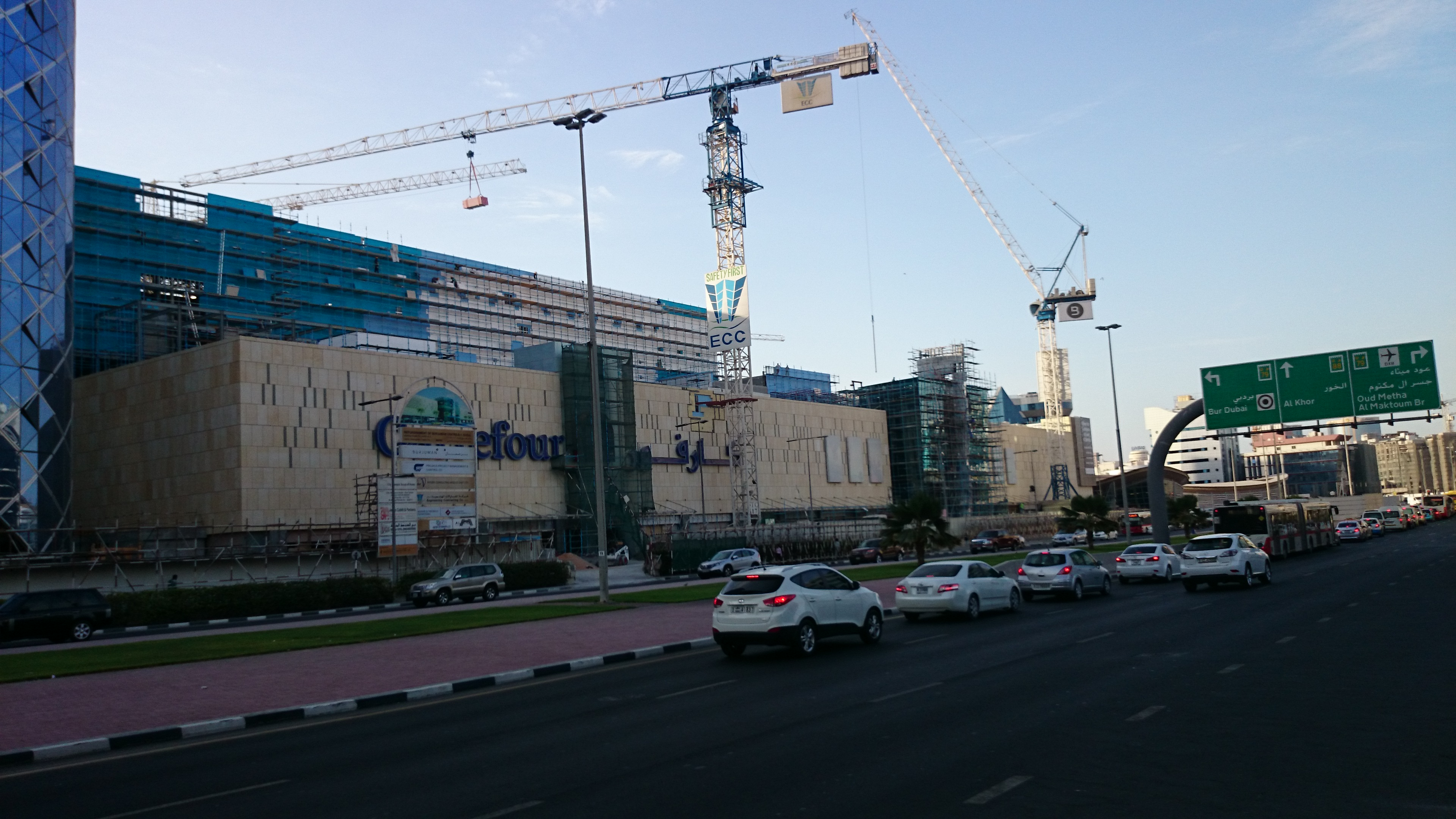
The North Wing is under renovation (September 2014)

In May 2011, Burjuman announced the start of major renovation work to its North Wing which was first opened in 1991, as part of its ongoing commitment to offer retail tenants and customers an enhanced shopping and entertainment experience.

The renovations aimed at extending and architecturally unifying the mall's physical space as well as enhancing the shopping and entertainment experience, with the addition of new anchor tenants, including a major grocery store and multiplex cinema.

Key elements of the renovation included the addition of a fourth floor for the cinema complex and the extension of the third floor family entertainment area to include an extended food court. Following the renovations, the food court doubled in size and link directly to the Pavilion Gardens in the mall's South wing. Several new F&B brands were expected to join BurJuman's current dining offering.

In addition, the mall's north exterior entrance was set to be completely redesigned and an al fresco dining area added to the wing to match the design of the South Wing.

The total retail area will be increased from 800,000 sq ft (74,000 m^{2}) to 1,000,000 sq ft (93,000 m^{2}).

== See also ==
- List of shopping malls in the United Arab Emirates
