= List of shopping malls in the United Arab Emirates =

This is a list of shopping malls in the United Arab Emirates. This includes shopping malls/outlet malls that have various different shops from different brands, food courts and/or movie theatres.

== Emirate of Abu Dhabi ==
=== Abu Dhabi ===
- Abu Dhabi Mall
- Al Mariah Mall
- Al Maqtaa Mall
- Al Raha Mall
- Al Wahda Mall
- Bawabat Al Sharq Mall
- Capital Mall (China Centre), Mussafah
- City Center Masdar, Masdar City
- Dalma Mall, Mussafah
- Deerfields Mall
- Forsan Central Mall, Khalifa City
- Khalidiyah Mall
- Madinat Zayed Shopping Center
- Marina Mall
- Mazyad Mall, Mussafah
- Mushrif Mall
- Nation Towers Mall
- Paragon Bay Mall, Al Reem Island
- Reem Mall, Al Reem Island
- Shams Boutik Mall, Al Reem Island
- The Galleria, Al Maryah Island
- The Mall, World Trade Center Abu Dhabi
- Yas Mall, Yas Island

=== Al Ain ===
- Mall of Al Ain (Formerly Al Ain Mall)
- Al Foah Mall
- Al Jimi Mall
- Barari Outlet Mall
- Bawadi Mall
- Hili Mall
- Remal Mall

=== Ruwais ===
- Ruwais Mall, Ruwais

== Emirate of Ajman ==
- City Centre Ajman
- Grand Mall Ajman

== Emirate of Dubai ==
- Al Ghurair Centre (First "Modern" Mall in Dubai)
- Madina Mall
- Dubai Mall (Biggest Mall as New South China Mall)
- Mall of the Emirates (Al Barsha 1)
- Mirdif City Centre
- Mercato Shopping Mall
- Dubai Festival City
- Arabian Centre
- Dubai Marina Mall
- BurJuman Mall
- Dubai Outlet Mall
- Deira City Center
- City Center Me'aisem
- Cityland Mall
- Galleria Mall (Jumeirah)
- Galleria Mall (Al Barsha)
- Times Square Center (Al Quoz)
- Dubai Hills Mall
- Oasis Mall
- First Avenue Mall
- Expo Mall (Closed)
- Ibn Battuta Mall (Jebel Ali Village)
- Century Mall
- Wafi Mall (Umm Hurair 2)
- Grand City Mall
- Al Barsha Mall (beside Al Barsha Pond Park)
- Circle Mall (Jumeirah Village Circle)
- Building Materials Mall
- Etihad Mall
- Al Mizhar Mall
- Aswaaq Community Mall
- LuLu Center – LuLu Village
- Abuhail Centre
- Reef Mall
- Green House
- Silicon Central
- City Centre Al Shindagha
- Gate Avenue at DIFC

== Emirate of Sharjah ==
- Sharjah City Centre
- Sahara Centre
- Safeer Mall (permanently closed, being renovated)
- Rolla Mall
- Mega Mall
- Safari Mall
- Ansar Mall (under new ownership, old Ansar name being removed in favour of Green Land)
- Night To Night Mall (previously IMall)
- Al Zahia City Center
- Oasis Mall
- Grand Mall
- Rahmania Mall
- Suyoh Mall
- 06 Mall
- Grand Mall Sharjah

== Ras Al Khaimah ==
- Manar Mall
- Al Hamra Mall
- RAK Mall
- Al Naeem Mall
- City Centre Al Dhait

== Umm Al Quwain ==
- Mall of UAQ
- China Mall UAQ
- City Mall

== Fujairah ==
- Fujairah Mall
- City Centre Fujairah
- Century Mall Fujairah

== Future malls ==
- Mall of Arabia
- SM City Dubai
- Dubai Square
- Meydan One Mall
- Mushrif Mall
- Circle Mall
