= Union (Dubai Metro) =

Metro station in Dubai, United Arab Emirates

Union اتحاد

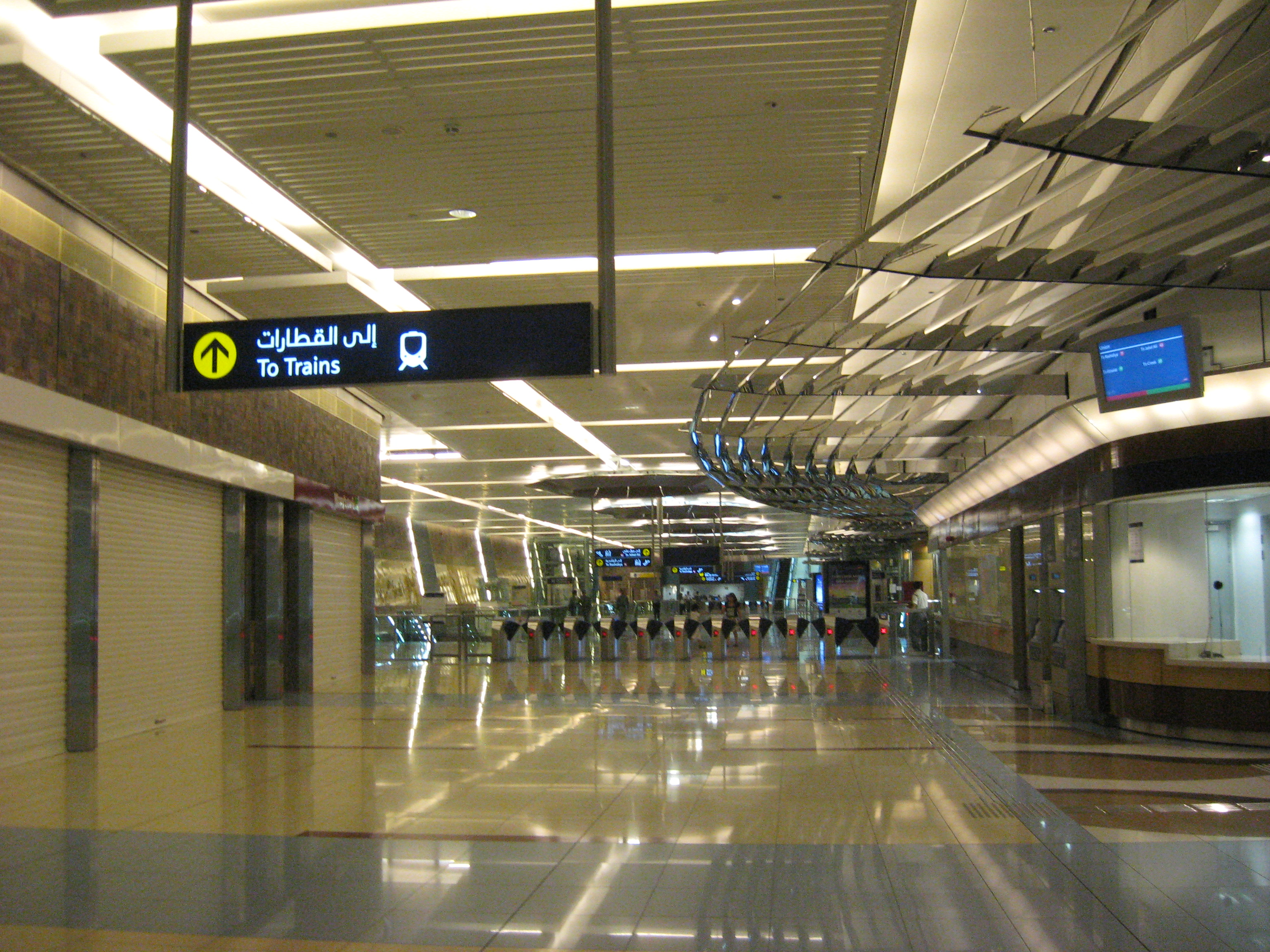
- Internal view at the station

General information
- Location: Union Square; Al Rigga; Dubai, United Arab Emirates
- Coordinates: 25°15′58″N 55°18′50″E
- System: Metro Station
- Operator: Dubai Metro
- Line: Green Line Red Line
- Platforms: 4 side platforms
- Tracks: 4
- Connections: RTA Dubai: 5 Union - Abu Hail; 11A Gold Souq Stn. - Al Awir; 27 Gold Souq Stn. - The Dubai Mall; 53 Gold Souq Stn. - Int'l City; 64A Gold Souq Stn. - Ras Al Khor, Samari Res.; 91A Gold Souq Stn. - Jebel Ali Stn; 103 Union Stn. - Global Village; C1 Airport Term. 3 - Al Satwa Stn; C4 Gold Souq Stn. - Jaddaf; C5 Gold Souq Stn. - Al Ghubaiba Stn; C9 Al Satwa Stn. -; C28 Gold Souq Stn. - Mamzar Beach Pk.; E303 Union Stn. - Al Jubail Stn. (Sharjah); E400 Union Stn. - Ajman; E700 Union Stn. - Fujairah; X2 Union Stn - Satwa Stn; X94 Gold Souq Stn. - Dubai Investment Pk. 1; Ras Al Khaimah Transport Authority: DXB1 Al Hamra Bus Stn. - Union MS

Construction
- Structure type: Underground
- Accessible: yes

Other information
- Station code: 20 (Green Line); 18 (Red Line)
- Fare zone: 5

History
- Opened: 9 September 2009

Services
Preceding station	Dubai Metro	Following station
Baniyas Square towards Creek	Green Line	Salah Al Din towards e&
BurJuman towards Expo 2020 or Life Pharmacy	Red Line	Al Rigga towards Centrepoint
Location

Union (Arabic: اتحاد, Ittiḥād, Arabic pronunciation: [itːiħaːd]) is a rapid transit station on the Green and Red Lines of the Dubai Metro in Dubai. It is one of two transfer stations between lines, the other being BurJuman. Since it began service, over 16.224 million passengers have used Union station, making it the busiest station on the network.

== History ==
Union station opened on 9 September 2009 as part of the initial opening of the Dubai Metro, with Red Line trains running from Rashidiya (Now Centerpoint) to Nakheel Harbour and Tower (Now National Paints). Union was one of seven intermediate stations to begin service, with additional stations on the Red Line added intermittently over the next year. Exactly two years later, the Green Line began service.

== Location ==
Located in the heart of Deira, Union station lies below Union Square. It is one of the closest metro stations to the central portion of Dubai Creek. As a result of its central location, nearby attractions and points of interest include numerous consulates, Dubai municipal government buildings, Al Ghurair Centre and Maktoum Hospital. It is also close to Al Ghurair Centre, Dubai Creek, Twin Towers, and Union Square Bus Station (with buses to Ajman, Fujairah, and Sharjah).

== Station layout ==
As one of two interchange points between the Green and Red Lines, Union station is one of the most complex stations of the Dubai Metro. Spanning 25,000 square metres (269,098 sq ft), it is the largest underground station in the world. Both lines utilise a side platform setup with two tracks each; the Green Line tracks approach the station from the west below Al Maktoum Road and turn northwards underneath Omar Bin Al Khattab Road, while the Red Line crosses Dubai Creek and travels below Omar Bin Al Khattab Road before turning sharply eastward underneath Al Rigga Road.

G	Street level	Exit/Entrance
L1	Concourse	Automatic Fare control, station agent, Metro Card vending machines, crossover
L2	Side platform | Doors will open on the Right
L2	Platform 2 Southbound	Towards ← Life Pharmacy / Expo 2020; Next Station: BurJuman; Change at the next station for M2
L2	Platform 1 Eastbound	Towards → Centrepoint; Next Station: Al Rigga
L2	Island platform | P1 & P4 doors will open on the Right
L2	Platform 4 Westbound	Towards ← Creek; Next Station: Baniyas Square
L2	Platform 3 Northbound	Towards → E& Next Station: Salah Al Din
L2	Side platform | Doors will open on the left

== Gallery ==
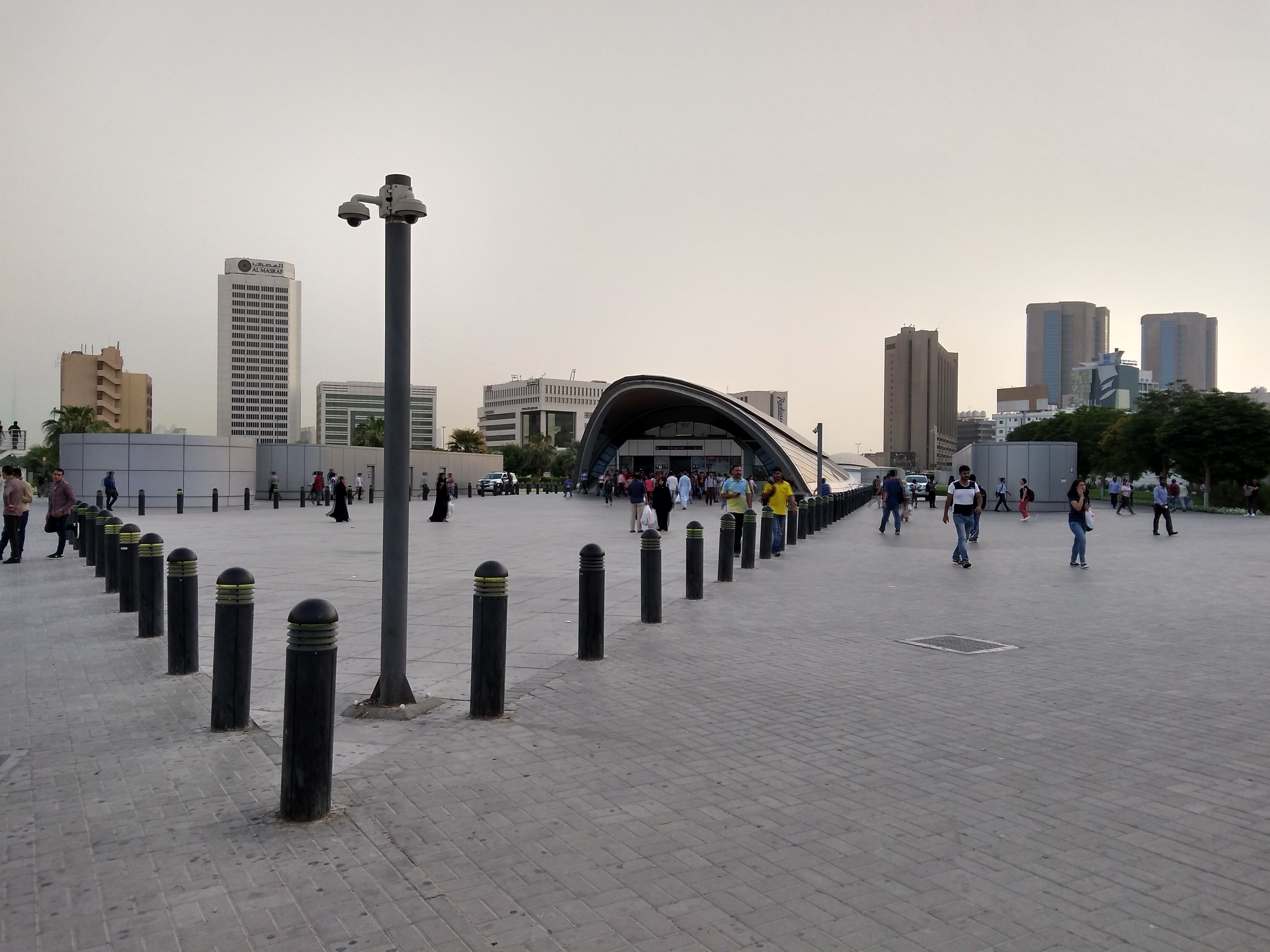
Station entrance in Union Square

Station entrance at sunset
