= Wafi Mall =

Shopping mall in Dubai, UAE

- وافي مول
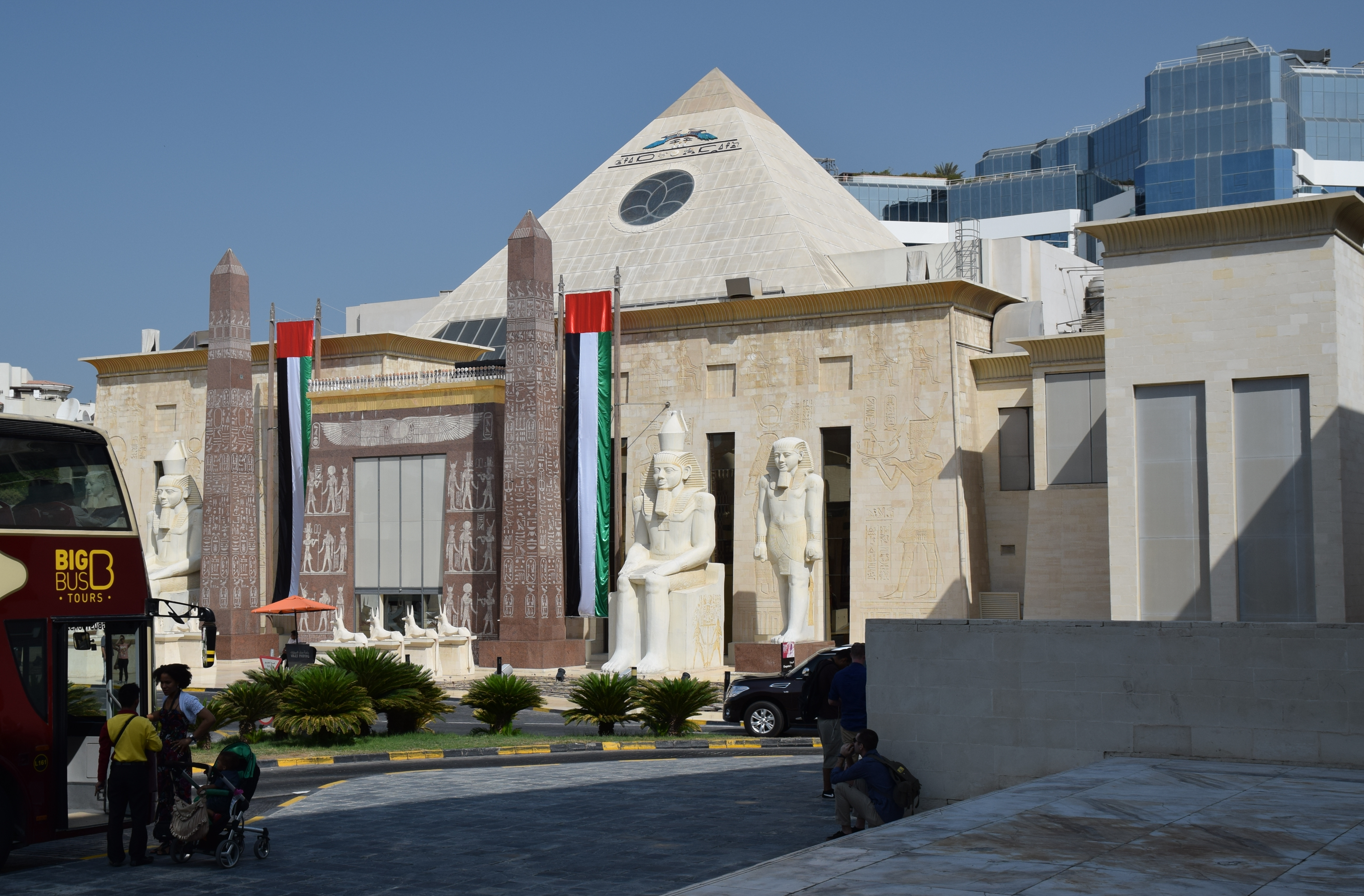
- Wafi Mall courtyard
- Location: Umm Hurair 2, Dubai, United Arab Emirates
- Coordinates: 25.228882°N 55.319247°E
- Address: Intersection of Sheikh Rashid Road and Oud Metha Road, Umm Hurair 2, PO Box 721
- Opened: 1991
- Num. of stores: 300+
- Num. of anchor tenants: 2
- Floor area: 80,000 m^{2} (860,000 sq ft)
- Floors: 5
- Public transit: Dubai Healthcare City Green Line
- Website: www.wafi.com

Wafi Mall is one of the oldest malls in Dubai, United Arab Emirates. The mall is in the Wafi City complex that also includes Raffles and Sofitel Dubai 5-star hotel in the shapes of a pyramid and obelisk respectively, restaurants, residences, a nightclub, and a spa/leisure club, themed around the style of Ancient Egypt. The mall includes an Arabian-style Khan Murjan Souk, Carrefour hypermarket, and a Samal department store.

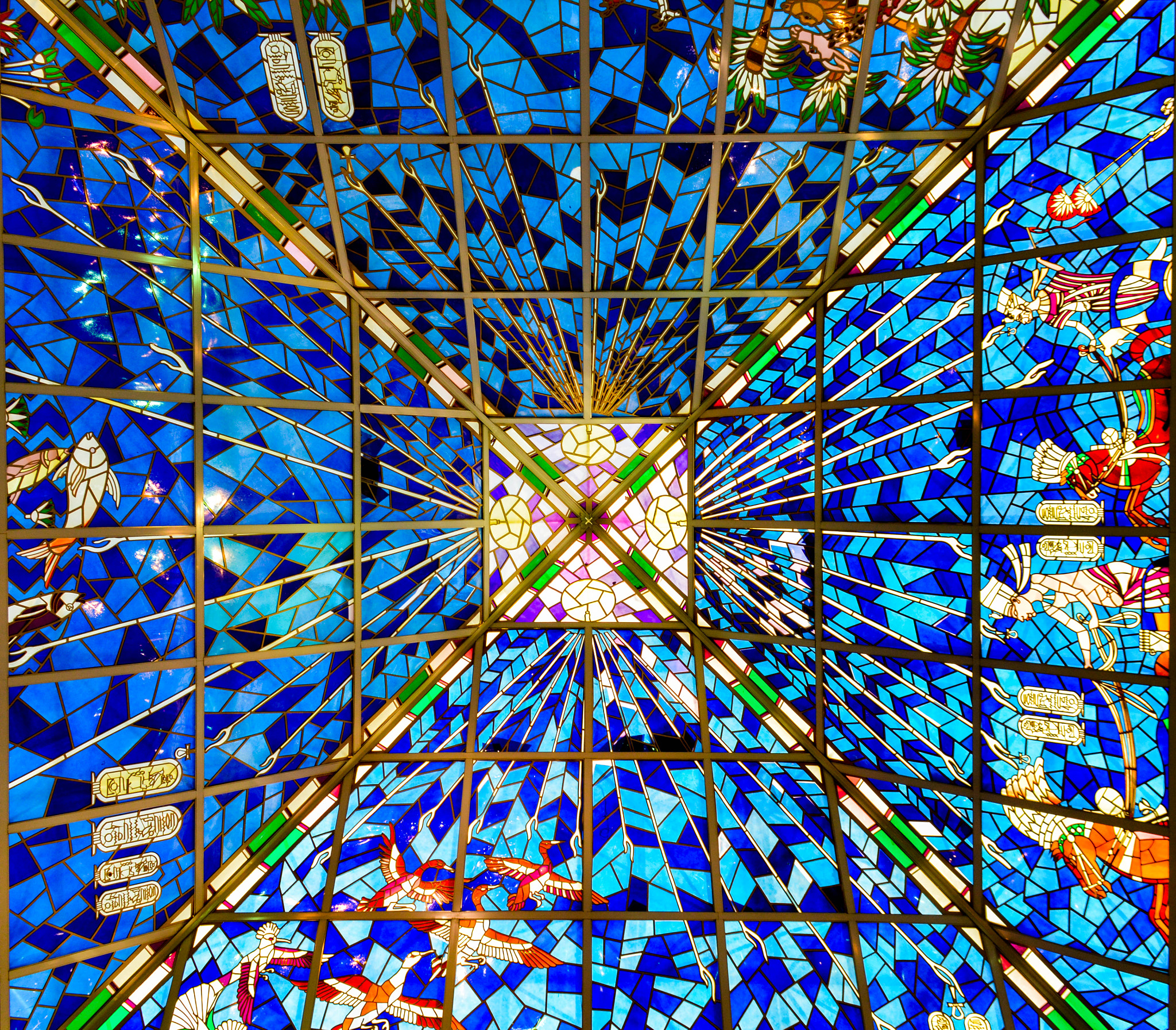
Stained glass ceiling in the mall

The mall opened in 1991, and includes over 300 stores. It features stained glass ceilings in an Islamic style. The mall features a visa application centre. Free Wi-Fi is available in the mall, provided by du.

In 2007, a gang of masked gunmen rammed two cars into shops at the mall, later set on fire, stealing cash and diamonds worth 14.7 million Dirhams. Later they were arrested in Europe and returned to Dubai. One gang member was later found dead in their cell.

== Aya exhibit ==
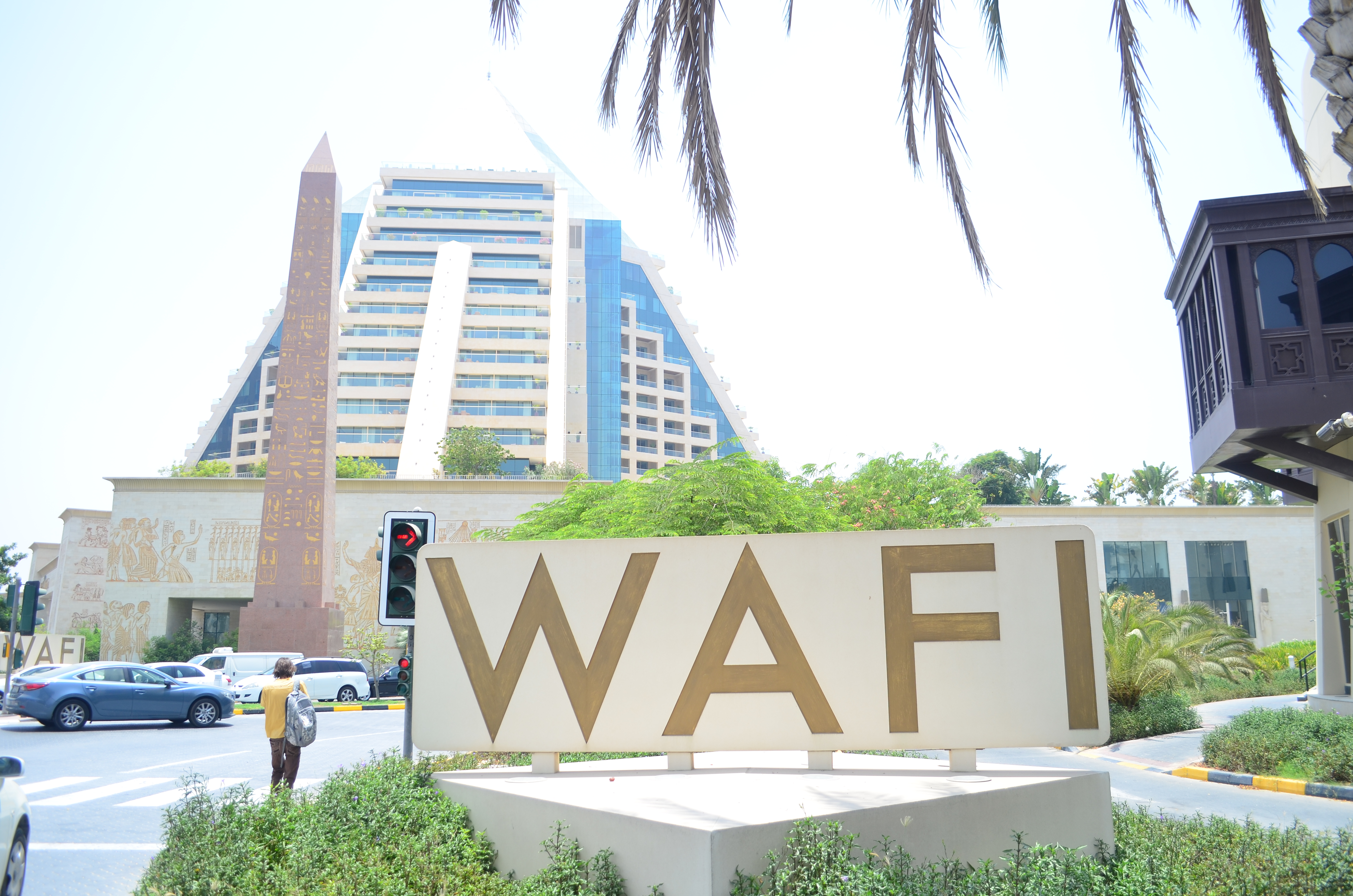
Wafi Mall

In December 2022, AYA opened at Wafi City as an immersive entertainment attraction and the first venue developed under the AYA experience brand. Spanning approximately 40,000 sq ft (3,700 m²), the venue contains 12 interconnected zones using scenography, projection, lighting, spatial audio, and interactive media. Its environments are themed around cosmic landscapes and speculative forms of nature. The attraction features original visual content, soundscapes, and interactive design conceived as a single immersive world.

== Transport ==
The nearest metro station is Dubai Healthcare City on the Green Line.

== See also ==
- List of shopping malls in Dubai
- Dubai Healthcare City
- Wafi City
