= Al Jalila Foundation =

Emirati charity organization

- Named after: Al Jalila Bint Mohammed Bin Rashid Al Maktoum
- Formation: 1 April 2013
- Founder: Mohammed Bin Rashid Al Maktoum
- Founded at: Mohammed Bin Rashid Academic Medical Center, Dubai Healthcare City
- Type: Non profit charitable organization
- Legal status: Active
- Purpose: Promoting medical education and research in the UAE
- Headquarters: Mohammed Bin Rashid Academic Medical Center, Dubai Healthcare City
- Location: Dubai
- Coordinates: 25°13′59.3″N 55°19′25.1″E
- Region served: United Arab Emirates
- Chairperson: Ahmed bin Saeed Al Maktoum
- Website: www.aljalilafoundation.ae

Al Jalila Foundation is a charity organization for promoting medical education and research in the United Arab Emirates. It was founded by Mohamed Bin Rashid Al Maktoum, the prime minister of the UAE and the ruler of Dubai in 2013.

== Overview ==
The formation of Al Jalila Foundation was announced on 26 November 2012 by an official decree 23/2012 to form a foundation for the promotion of innovative medical research and medical education in the United Arab Emirates. The activities of the foundation commenced on 1 April 2014 from its office at Building no. 27 of the Dubai Healthcare City, a free economic zone dedicated to the healthcare sector.

Board of Trustees is chaired by Ahmed bin Rashid Al Maktoum.

The foundation plans to establish a research centre, Al Jalila Foundation Research Centre within the Dubai Healthcare City in 2016. It has launched a medical research fund, Majlis Al Ata’a, for developing local scientists in association with global and regional scientific institutions.

The foundation organizes career fairs in health services to create awareness among Emarati students about career opportunities in the healthcare sector. It has collaborations with universities in the UAE for selecting deserving candidates for its scholarship schemes. It has also entered into an agreement with the Ministry of Higher Education and Scientific Research (UAE) for promotion of medical education in the country. The agreement is expected support the six-month training program, Ta'alouf,, launched by the foundation in association with the Zayed University.

== See also ==
- Mohammed Bin Rashid Al Maktoum
- Ahmed bin Rashid Al Maktoum
- Ministry of Higher Education and Scientific Research (UAE)
- Zayed University
