= Al Ghurair Centre =

- مركز الغرير
- Location: Dubai, United Arab Emirates
- Coordinates: 25°16′03″N 55°19′03″E
- Address: Al Rigga Road, Deira, Dubai, United Arab Emirates
- Opened: 1981
- Renovated: 1 October 2013
- Developer: Al Ghurair Group
- Owner: Al Ghurair Group
- Architect: RTKL Associates
- Num. of stores: approx. 370
- Floor area: approx. 2,400,000 sq ft (220,000 m^{2})(after renovation)
- Floors: 3
- Public transit: Union Metro Station Red Line Green Line Bus routes: 77, C09
- Website: https://alghuraircentre.com/en

Al Ghurair Centre (Arabic: مركز الغرير; formerly Al Ghurair City) is a shopping mall in Deira, Dubai, which was established in 1981. It was the first "Modern Shopping Mall" in the region.It is owned by the Al Ghurair Group.

== Retail Anchors ==
Al Ghurair Center houses over approx. 370 retail stores

=== Carrefour ===
On 26 March 2015, the Majid al Futtaim Group, a Franchise partner, opened a Carrefour in Al Ghurair Centre with a sales area of over 4,500 square metres (48,000 sq ft).

== History ==
Dubai's retail scene had begun shortly before with Al Mulla Plaza, which one account describes as the city's first multipurpose property (1978), followed by the region's first purpose-built modern shopping mall, Al Ghurair City, reports say that Al Ghurair was the only "proper" mall in town, and the one that drew the crowds.

=== Expansion ===
In 2013, the mall underwent a Dh2 Billion expansion adding 375,000 sq ft (34,800 m^{2}) of retail space and 150 stores, bringing the total to 250. The developers aimed to create a district around the mall with space for street theatre, art, and music.

== See also ==
- List of shopping malls in the United Arab Emirates
