= Al Jadaf (Dubai Metro) =

Metro station in Dubai, UAE

Al Jadaf الجداف

General information
- Location: Sheikh Rashid Road; Al Jaddaf, Dubai; UAE
- Coordinates: 25.2250°N 55.3338°E
- System: Metro Station
- Operator: Dubai Metro
- Line: Green Line
- Platforms: 2
- Tracks: 2
- Connections: RTA Dubai: C04 Gold Souq Bus Stn - Jaddaf

Other information
- Station code: 29
- Fare zone: 6

History
- Opened: March 1, 2014

Services
Preceding station	Dubai Metro	Following station
Creek Terminus	Green Line	Dubai Healthcare City towards e&
Location

Al Jadaf (aka Al Jaddaf, Arabic: الجداف) is a rapid transit station on the Green Line of the Dubai Metro in Dubai, UAE. It serves as the penultimate station before the western terminus of the line.

The station opened on 1 March 2014 as part of an extension to the Green Line. It is close to the Jaddaf Waterfront.

== Station Layout ==
G	Street level	Exit/Entrance
L1	Concourse	Automatic Fare Collection gates, station agent, crossover
L2	Side platform | Doors will open on the right
L2	Platform 1 Westbound	Towards ← E& Next Station: Dubai Healthcare City
L2	Platform 2 Eastbound	Towards → Creek; Change at the next station for M4
L2	Side platform | Doors will open on the right

== See also ==
- Al Jaddaf Marine Station
