= Wafi City =

- Wafi City, taken from At the Top, Burj Khalifa with Dubai International Airport at the background
- Interactive map of Wafi City
- Country: United Arab Emirates
- Website: www.wafi.com

Wafi city is an urban development city in Dubai, United Arab Emirates. The complex includes a mall, two 5-star hotels, restaurants, residences, and a nightclub. The "city" is styled after Ancient Egypt. This themed environment includes columns reminiscent of Karnak, small pyramids, and images of pharaohs. The walls are the colour of the light brown stone that can be found on structures in Ancient Egypt.

== Transport ==
The nearest metro station is Dubai Healthcare City on the Green Line.

== Landmarks ==
=== Wafi Mall ===
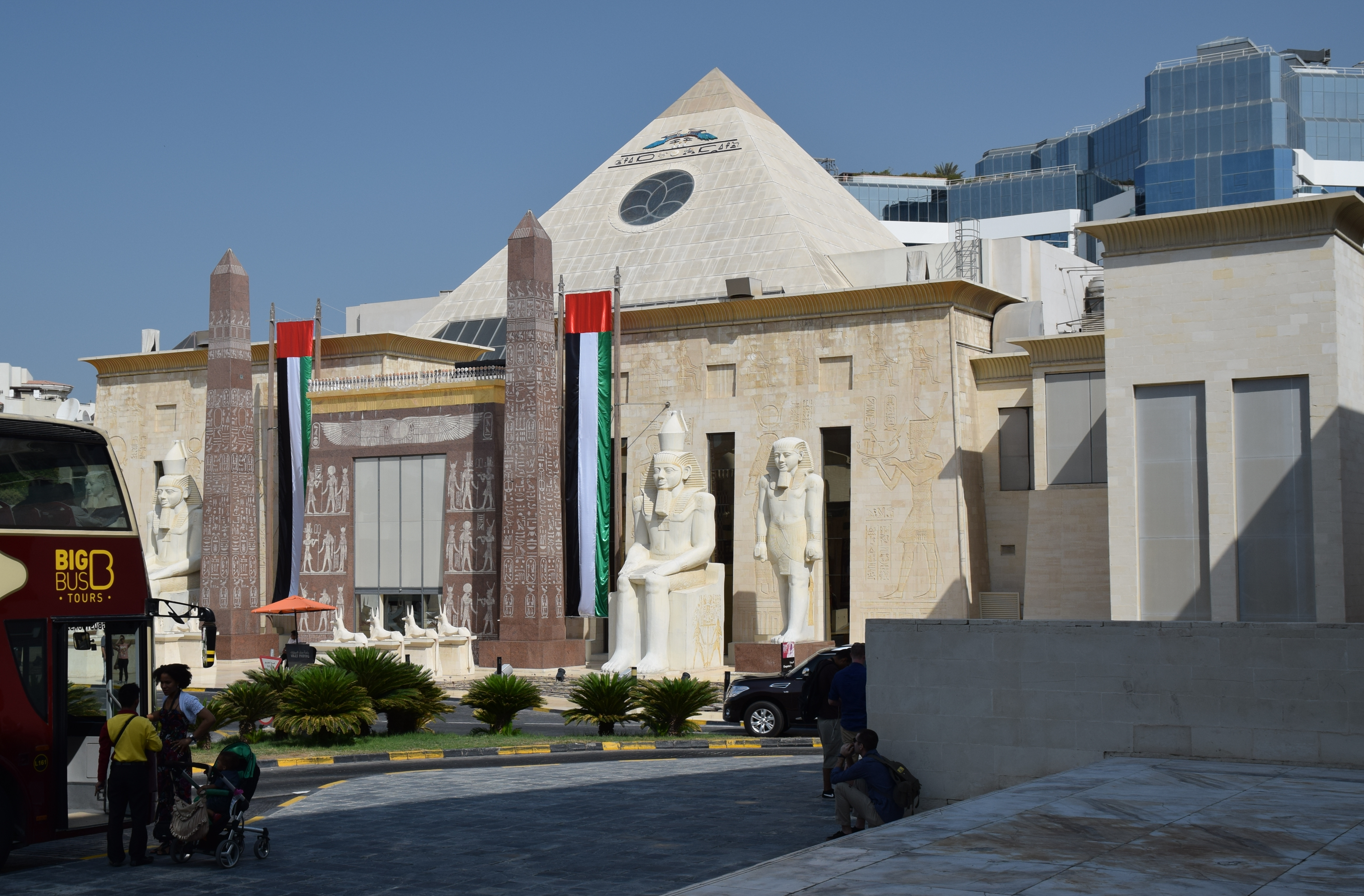
Wafi Mall

The main feature of Wafi is the mall, called Wafi Mall. Opened in 1991, the mall includes over 300 stores. Wafi Mall features stained glass ceilings, with scenes selected from mosques and temples across the Islamic world.

In 2007, many masked gunmen rammed two cars into some shops at the mall. They stole cash and diamonds. They were later found in Europe and sent back to Dubai.

=== Raffles Dubai ===
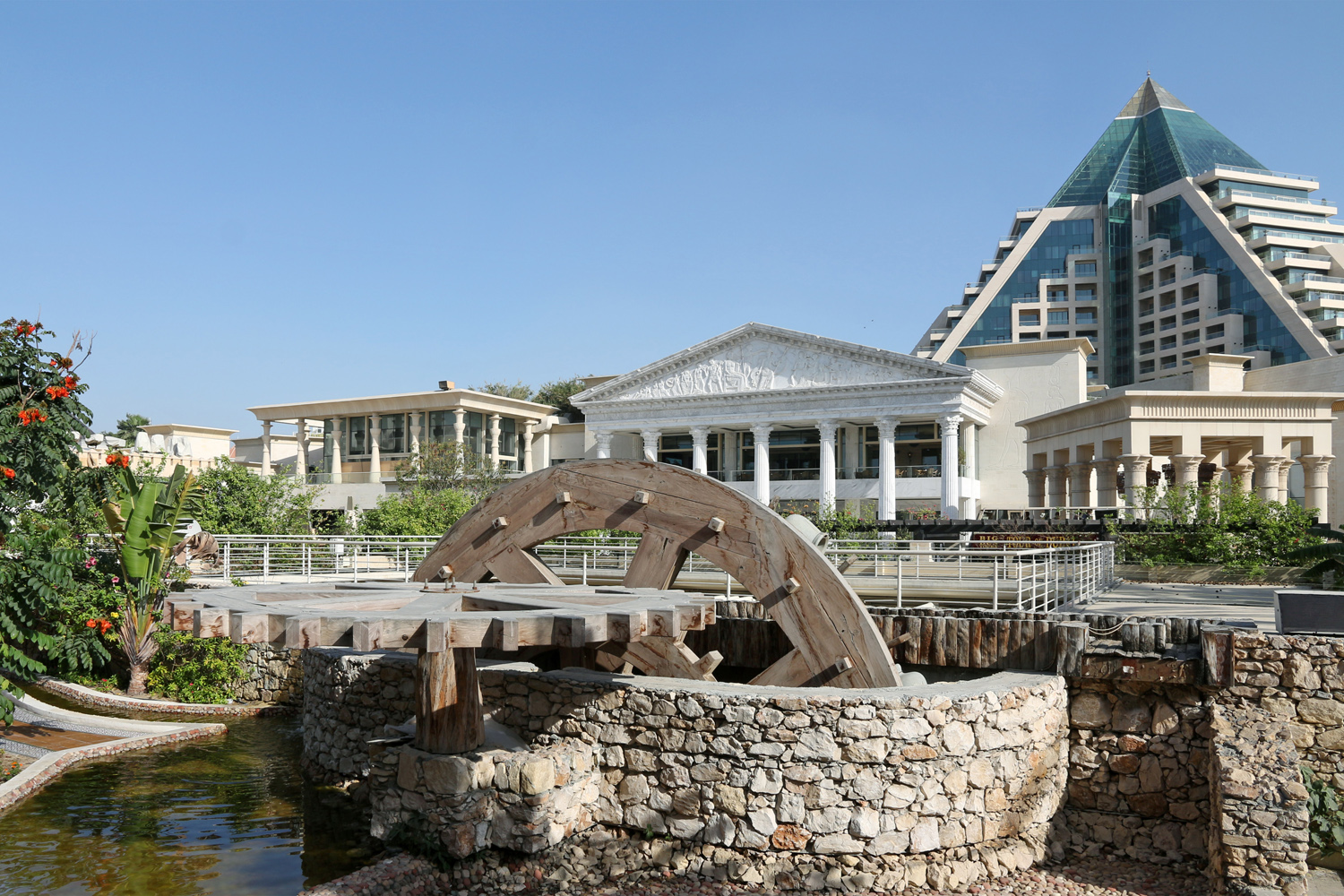
Raffles Dubai

In November 2007, Raffles opened its first property in the Middle East. Raffles Dubai is a 5-star hotel in a pyramidal shape that contains 248 rooms on 18 floors. The Raffles Dubai hotel is ranked amongst the top hotels in the world. This building is positioned close to the Khan Murjan Souk Wafi.

=== Sofitel Dubai The Obelisk ===
Sofitel Dubai The Obelisk

The Sofitel Dubai The Obelisk owned by Accor was opened in November 2020. It is built in an Obelisk shape with a structural height of 230 m (755 ft) and contains 498 rooms on 50 floors in addition to 96 furnished Apartments & Residences.

=== Pyramids ===
The Pyramids is a complex that contains several restaurants, cafés, and spas, including Cleopatra's Spa and Pharaoh's Club.

=== Wafi Residence ===
Wafi Residence is a residential complex that opened in July 1995. Residents have full membership to the spas in the Pyramids.

== See also ==
- Dubai Healthcare City
