= Umm Hurair =

Umm Hurair ام هرير
- Community
- Interactive map of Umm Hurair
- Coordinates: Umm Hurair 1: 25°25′33″N 55°30′21″E; Umm Hurair 2: 25°24′23″N 55°32′51″E
- Country: United Arab Emirates
- Emirate: Dubai
- City: Dubai
- Boroughs: List: Umm Hurair 1; Umm Hurair 2

Area
  - Total: 2.3 km^{2} (0.89 sq mi)

Population 2000
  - Total: 4,428
  - Density: 1,900/km^{2} (5,000/sq mi)

Umm Hurair (Arabic: ام هرير) is a locality in Dubai, United Arab Emirates (UAE). Umm Hurair has a small residential community as well as a shopping and economic district with shopping malls, hotels, banks and restaurants.

Umm Hurair is divided into two sub-communities:

- Umm Hurair 1 is located in the heart of Bur Dubai, across Al Mankhool and Al Karama. Important landmarks in Umm Hurair 1 include BurJuman shopping mall, Bur Dubai Spinneys and the Golden Sands chain of hotels.
- Umm Hurair 2 is the locality bordering the Dubai Creek in between the Floating Bridge and the Al Garhoud Bridge. Umm Hurair 2 is home to newer real estate development projects such as Dubai Healthcare City, Al Boom Tourist Village, Dubai Creek Park,DMI, and Wafi City including Wafi Mall.

Umm Hurair 1 and 2 are geographically separated by the localities of Al Nasr (Oud Metha) and Al Karama.
