= Mushrif Mall =

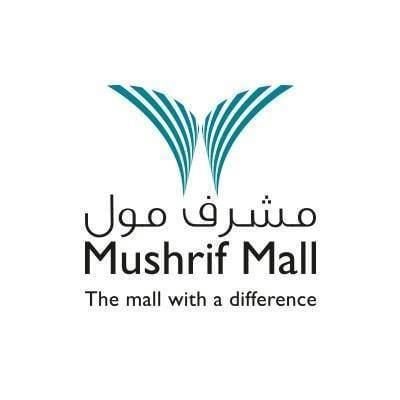
- Location: Abu Dhabi, United Arab Emirates
- Coordinates: 24.4342291°N 54.4129855°E
- Opened: 2011
- Manager: Riyas Cherichi
- Owner: LuLu Group International
- Floor area: 56,000 m2
- Floors: 3
- Website: mushrifmall.com

Mushrif Mall is a three-level shopping mall that is located in the city of Abu Dhabi, on Rashid bin Saeed and Al Dhafra Streets. The mall houses Lulu Hypermarket, fish, meat, fruit and vegetables market, retail outlets, restaurants, cafeterias, coffee shops, entertainment and fun areas.

The mall is owned by LuLu Group International and was opened in 2011.

== History ==
The 180,000 square metres mall was constructed at the cost of UAE Dirham 1.2 billion (US$ 326.7 million) and was officially inaugurated in 2011. The supermarkets in the mall house a huge fresh produce market measuring 25,000 square metres, with stalls for fish, meat, fruit and vegetables.

In November 2022, Abu Dhabi Health Services Company, SEHA announced the opening of a new disease prevention and visa screening centre at Mushrif Mall. The center is intended to provide easy access to medical residency procedures, including fast track and regular visa medical screening services.
