= Al Mankhool =

Al Mankhool المنخول
- community
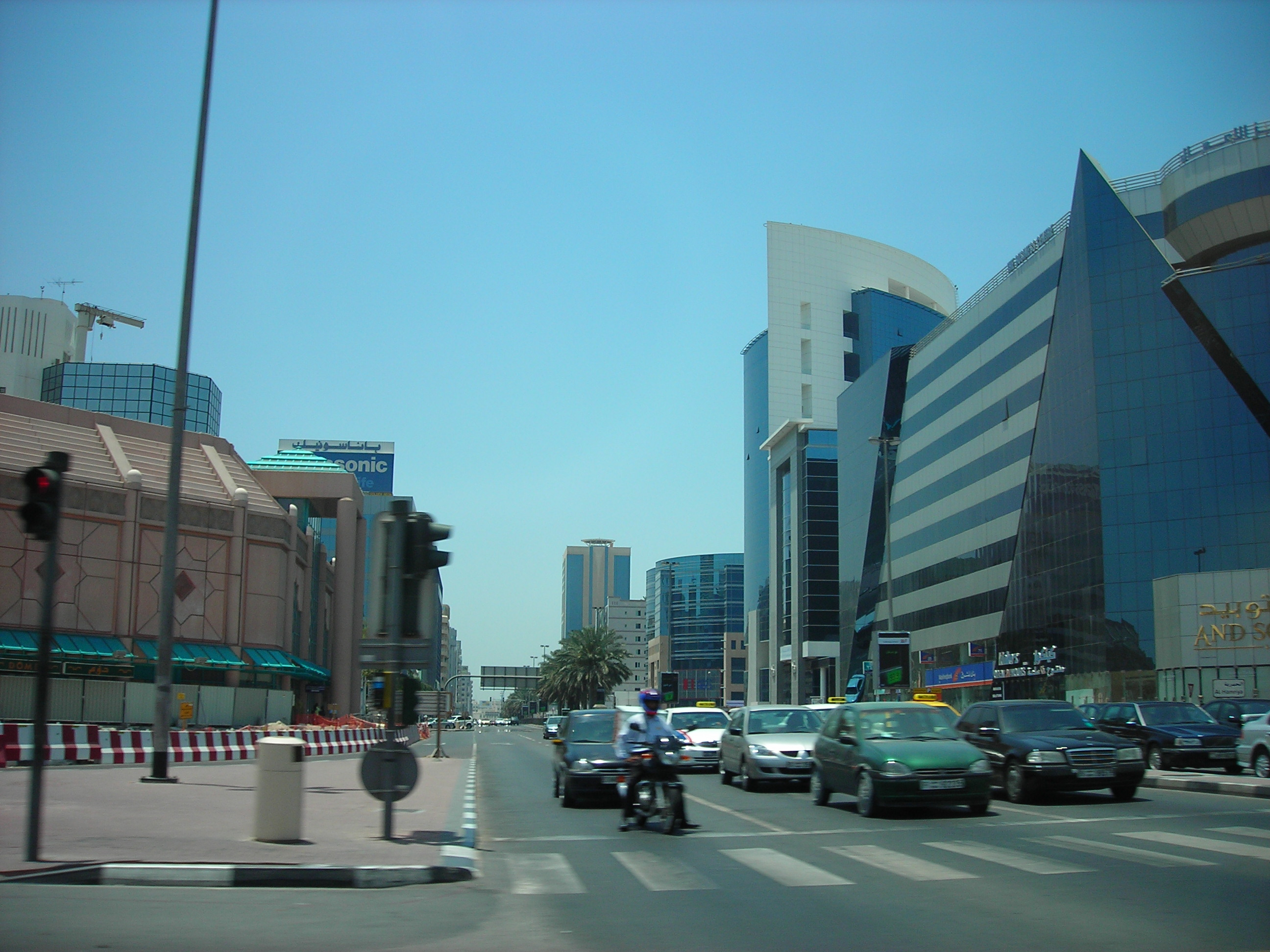
- Intersection of Al Hamriya and Al Mankhool
- Interactive map of Al Mankhool
- Coordinates: 25.24648°N 55.29239°E
- Country: United Arab Emirates
- Emirate: Dubai
- City: Dubai

Area
  - Total: 1 km^{2} (0.39 sq mi)

Population (2000)
  - Total: 16,013
  - Density: 16,000/km^{2} (41,000/sq mi)
- Community number: 317

Al Mankhool (Arabic: المنخول) is a locality in Dubai, United Arab Emirates (UAE). Located in western Dubai, in the area of Bur Dubai, Al Mankhool is largely a residential area. However, several restaurants, hotels and financial service corporations (such as Citibank and Emirates NBD) are located in Al Mankhool. Route D 90 (Sheikh Sabah Al Ahmad Al Jaber Al Sabah Street) runs north-south through the locality, while Khaled bin Al Waleed Street runs perpendicular to Al Mankhool road. The section of Khaled bin Waleed Street that is in the proximity of Al Mankhool is sometimes referred to as Bank Street by expatriates.

Al Mankhool is bordered by Umm Hurair in the north, Al Rifa in the west, Al Karama to the east and Al Jafiliya to the south. Important landmarks in Al Mankhool include the Al Mankhool Community Health Centre and the Bur Dubai Etisalat service centre.
