= Green Line (Dubai Metro) =

Metro line in Dubai, United Arab Emirates

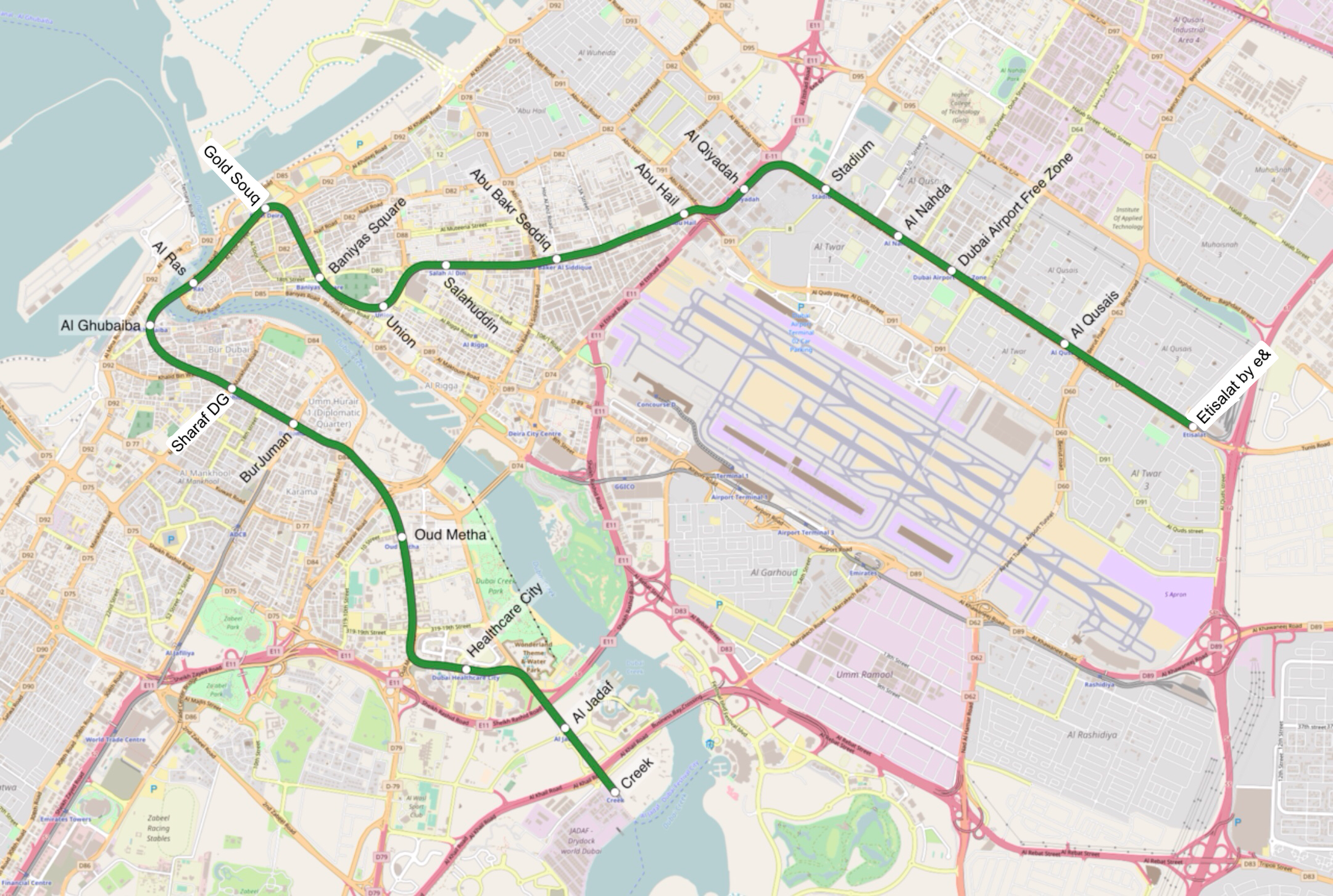
- Map of the Green Line in 2014

Overview
- Status: Open
- Owner: Roads and Transport Authority (Dubai)
- Locale: Dubai, United Arab Emirates
- Termini: Etisalat; Creek
- Stations: 20

Service
- Type: Rapid transit
- System: Dubai Metro
- Operator(s): keolis
- Daily ridership: 110,000

History
- Opened: 9 September 2011; 14 years ago (limited)
- Last extension: 2014

Technical
- Line length: 22.5 kilometers (14.0 mi)
- Track gauge: 1,435 mm (4 ft 8 1/2 in)
- Electrification: 750V DC Third rail
- Operating speed: 95 km/h (59 mph)

The Green Line is one of the two lines in the Dubai Metro network in Dubai, United Arab Emirates. It runs through Deira and Bur Dubai, generally parallel to Dubai Creek. There are 20 stations on the line, spanning from Etisalat to Creek (numbered 11 to 30 in zones 5 and 6) covering 22.5 km (14.0 mi). It was built by a consortium of Mitsubishi, Obayashi, Kajima and Yapı Merkezi.

== Statistics ==
The Green Line has 20 stations, including 12 elevated (by means of a viaduct), and 8 underground stations. The line is 22.5 kilometres (14.0 mi), with 7.9 kilometres (4.9 mi) underground. It is served by 25 driverless trains travelling at a maximum speed of 110 kilometres per hour (68 mph), and stopping 20–30 seconds at each station. Trial running began in October 2010, with the line inaugurated on 9 September 2011 and opened to the public the next day. The last two stations (Al Jadaf and Creek) were opened on 1 March 2014. As of 2018, 19 trains are running on the Green Line and each of the trains has a capacity of 643 seats.

The Green Line was initially 17.6 kilometres (10.9 mi) long upon opening, however following the extension from Dubai Healthcare City to Dubai Creek, the length increased to 22.5 kilometres (14.0 mi) long.

== Notable stations ==
There are two transfer stations, Union and BurJuman, where the Green and Red Lines intersect, allowing passengers to change between lines. The Green Line has its main depot in Al Qusais.

Union station is touted to be one of the biggest metro stations in the world. With an area spanning 25,000 square metres (269,098 sq ft), it has capacity to handle about 22,000 passengers per hour. Adding to the station's credentials are two entry points, two levels, a length extending 230 metres (755 ft), 50 metres (164 ft) of width and a depth of 18 metres (59 ft).

The biggest elevated station on the Green Line is the Al Qiyadah station along Al Ittihad Road near the Dubai Police General HQ. The station has a capacity to handle 11,000 passengers per hour in each direction.

The two terminal stations are e& and Creek. The Creek station is within walking distance of the Al Jaddaf Marine Station, linked to ferries on Dubai Creek, including an abra boat service to the Dubai Festival City Mall across the Creek.

== Extension ==
According to Gulf News in 2014, the plan to further extend the Green Line to Academic City is fully approved, in order to better serve the interests of residents in the Silicon Oasis and International City area.

== Route ==
Route of Green line

Green Line
Code	Station Name		Date Opened	Connections	Station Type	Platform Type
Code	English	Arabic	Date Opened	Connections	Station Type	Platform Type
11	E&	إي إند	9 September 2011	Etisalat Bus Station	Elevated	Island and Side
12	Al Qusais	اﻟﻘﺼﻴﺺ	9 September 2011		Elevated	Side
13	Dubai Airport Free Zone	المنطقة الحرة بمطار دبي	9 September 2011	Transfer to Terminal 2, Dubai International Airport.	Elevated	Side
14	Al Nahda	النهدة	9 September 2011		Elevated	Side
15	Stadium	الإستاد	9 September 2011		Elevated	Side
16	Al Qiyadah	القيادة	9 September 2011		Elevated	Side
17	Abu Hail	أبو هيل	9 September 2011		Elevated	Side
18	Abu Baker Al Siddique	أبو بكر الصديق	9 September 2011		Elevated	Side
19	Salah Al Din	صلاح الدين	9 September 2011		Underground	Side
20	Union	الاتحاد	9 September 2011	M1	Underground	Island and Side
21	Baniyas Square	بني ياس	9 September 2011		Underground	Side
22	Gold Souq	سوق الذهب	9 September 2011		Underground	Side
23	Al Ras	الراس	9 September 2011		Underground	Side
24	Al Ghubaiba	الغبيبة	9 September 2011		Underground	Side
25	Sharaf DG	شرف دي جي	9 September 2011		Underground	Side
26	BurJuman	برجمان	9 September 2011	M1	Underground	Side
27	Oud Metha	عود ميثاء	9 September 2011	St. Mary's Catholic Church, Dubai	Elevated	Side
28	Dubai Healthcare City	مدينة دبي الصحية	9 September 2011	Wafi City	Elevated	Side
29	Al Jadaf	الجداف	1 March 2014		Elevated	Side
30	Creek	الخور	1 March 2014	M4; Al Jaddaf Marine Transport Station	Elevated	Side
