= Creek (Dubai Metro) =

Metro station in Dubai, United Arab Emirates

Creek الخور

- View of the station

General information
- Location: Dubai Creek; Al Jaddaf; Dubai, United Arab Emirates
- Coordinates: 25°13′08″N 55°20′21″E
- System: Metro Station
- Operator: Dubai Metro
- Line: Green Line Blue Line
- Platforms: 2
- Tracks: 2
- Connections: RTA Dubai: C4 Gold Souq Stn. - Government Workshop; CR11 Al Jaddaf Marine (Creek) - Dubai Harbor City; BM2 Al Jaddaf Marine (Creek) - Dubai Festival City Marine

Other information
- Station code: 30 (Green Line); BG31 (Blue Line)
- Fare zone: 6

History
- Opened: March 1, 2014

Services
Preceding station	Dubai Metro	Following station
Terminus	Green Line	Al Jadaf towards e&
Proposed services
Terminus	Blue Line Creek branch Opening 2029	Dubai Festival City towards Academic City
Location

Creek (aka Dubai Creek, Arabic: الخور) is a rapid transit station on the Green Line of the Dubai Metro in Dubai, UAE. It serves as the western terminus of the line. The Mohammed Bin Rashid Library is in close proximity to the station.

== History ==
The station officially opened on 1 March 2014. The Green Line was initially designed to terminate at Dubai Healthcare City, but an extension was added to Dubai Creek via Al Jadaf metro station. According to Gulf News in 2014, there is a plan to further extend the Green Line to Academic City and to connect to Silicon Oasis and International City area.

On November 24, 2023, Sheikh Mohammed bin Rashid Al Maktoum, Ruler of Dubai, approved the Blue Line Metro Project and the Line will be extended from Creek to Academic City via Festival City, Dubai Creek Harbour, Ras Al Khor, International City and Dubai Silicon Oasis.

== Station Layout ==
G	Street level	Exit/Entrance
L1	Concourse	Automatic Fare Collection gates, station agent, crossover
L2	Side platform | Doors will open on the right
L2	Platform 1 Westbound	Towards ← E& Next Station: Al Jaddaf
L2	Platform 2 Eastbound	Towards → Train Terminates Here
L2	Side platform | Doors will open on the right

M4 Station layout (TBC)

G	Street level	Exit/Entrance
L1	Mezzanine	Automatic Fare Collection gates, station agent, crossover
L2	Side platform | Doors will open on the right
L2	Platform # Westbound	Towards ← Train Terminates Here
L2	Platform # Northbound	Towards → Academic City; Next Station: Dubai Creek Harbour
L2	Side platform | Doors will open on the right

== Al Jaddaf Marine Transport Station ==
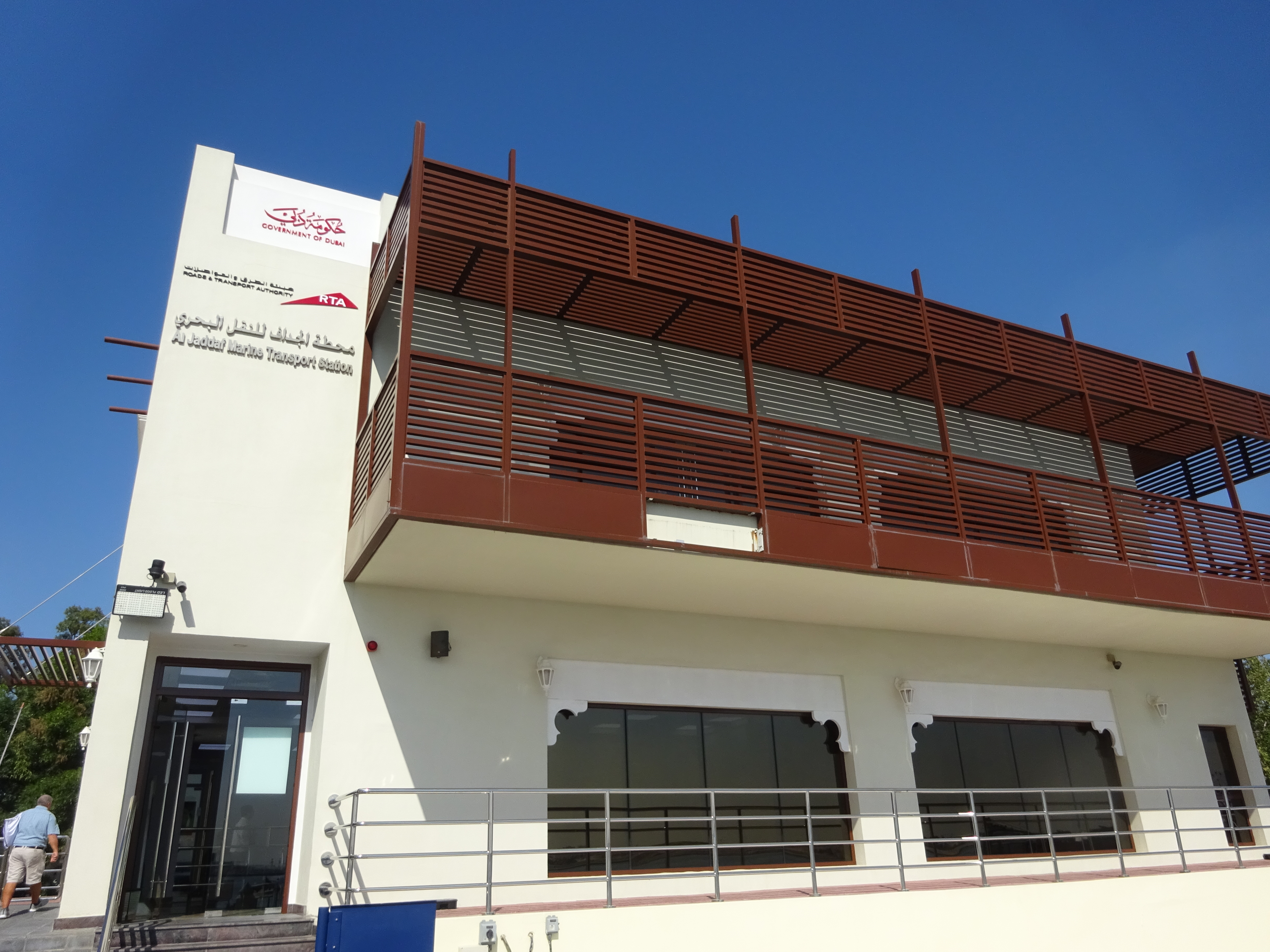
View of Al Jaddaf Marine Transport Station from Dubai Creek

The Al Jaddaf Marine Transport Station close to the Creek metro station is run by the Dubai Roads and Transport Authority (RTA), operating ferries on Dubai Creek itself. This includes an Abra boat service across the Creek to the mall at Dubai Festival City. This Connection transfers to Creek (Dubai Metro)
