= Dubai Healthcare City =

Healthcare free economic zone in Dubai

Coordinates: 25°13′59.3″N 55°19′25.1″E

- Company type: Free economic zone
- Founded: 2002
- Headquarters: Dubai, United Arab Emirates
- Website: http://www.dhcc.ae/

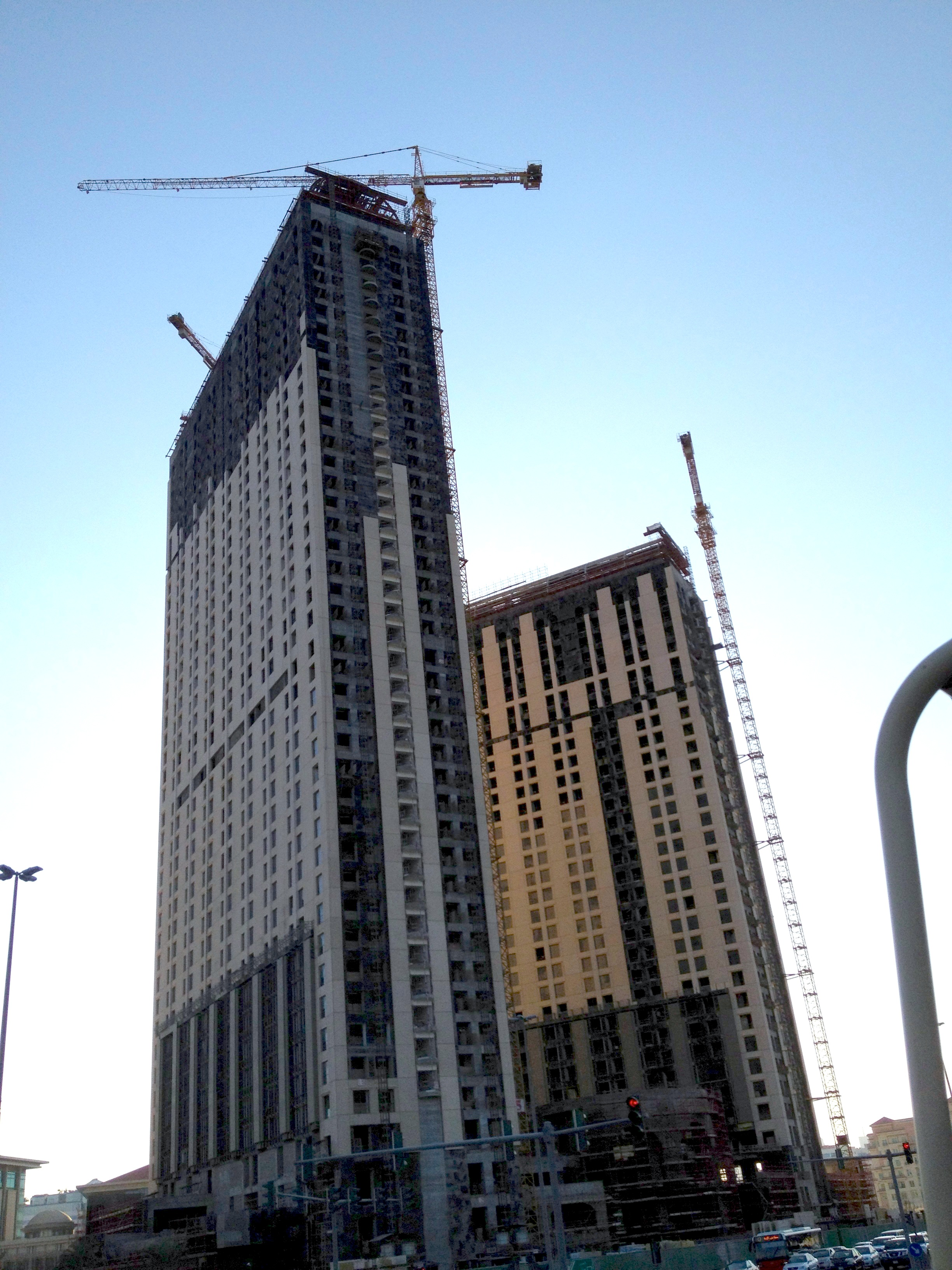
Buildings under construction in Dubai Healthcare City, 2011.

Dubai Healthcare City (DHCC) (Arabic: مدينة دبي الصحية) is a healthcare free economic zone situated in Umm Hurair, Dubai, United Arab Emirates. DHCC was launched in 2002 by Mohammed bin Rashid Al Maktoum, vice-president and Prime Minister of the UAE and Ruler of Dubai. DHCC was mandated by the government to meet the demand for high-quality, patient-centered healthcare, and the main aim is to attract tourists to Dubai for medical services and treatments.

Through strategic partnerships, DHCC provides a wide range of services in healthcare, medical education and research, pharmaceuticals, medical equipment, wellness and allied support.

DHCC comprises two phases. Phase 1 of DHCC is dedicated to healthcare and medical education and covers 4.1 million square feet. Phase 2, which is under development, is dedicated to wellness, and will cover 19 million square feet.

In 2014 alone, visits to DHCC were up 20 percent to 1.2 million from 1 million in 2013, of which 15 percent were medical tourists. According to DHCC, the most popular procedures sought by medical tourists to DHCC include infertility, cosmetic and dental treatments. Most medical tourists came to the DHCC from the Gulf Cooperation Council area (37 percent) and wider Arab world (25 percent), though 20 percent came from Europe and 18 from Asia.

== Divisions ==
DHCC, overseen by the Dubai Healthcare City Authority (DHCA), operates through four divisions: Healthcare, Education and Research, Investment and Regulatory.

Healthcare

DHCC is home to 120 medical facilities including hospitals – Emirates Specialty Hospital, Mediclinic City Hospital, and Dr Sulaiman Al-Habib Hospital – more than 120 outpatient medical centers and diagnostic laboratories with more than 4,000 licensed professionals.

Education and Research

Mohammed Bin Rashid University of Medicine and Health Sciences (MBRU) is the first medical university of Dubai Healthcare City Authority located in Dubai Healthcare City free zone. The university comprises two colleges, the Hamdan Bin Mohammed College of Dental Medicine, and the College of Medicine; the colleges offer six postgraduate specialty dentistry programs and a Bachelor of Medicine and Bachelor of Surgery (MBBS) degree respectively. MBRU integrates education, clinical practice, and research to provide an innovative academic experience. It has the technology and learning resources in place that enrich students’ experiences and journey. Learning resources include Al Maktoum Medical Library, that counts the rare 1867 volume of The Lancet in its permanent collection; the Khalaf Ahmad Al Habtoor Medical Simulation Center, the largest in the UAE, as well as dedicated research and anatomy labs. MBRU is accredited by the Ministry of Higher Education and Scientific Research in the United Arab Emirates, and the MBBS degree is listed on the World Directory of Medical Schools.

Investment

DHCC offers medical and healthcare providers with a ‘one-stop shop’ solution to set up operations and avail of free zone benefits. The investment product portfolio has clinical, commercial, retail, business centre and free-hold land.

Regulatory

Under DHCA, the Centre for Healthcare Planning and Quality (CPQ) is an independent regulatory body responsible for licensing healthcare providers and professionals, and setting and maintaining international best practice in healthcare delivery and patient care within DHCC.

== Notable personnel ==
Marwan Abedin, Chief Executive Officer of DHCC, serves as a Member of the Board of Directors of Dubai Healthcare City Authority, the legislative body of the free zone. Is also a Member of the Board of Directors of Emaar Properties PJSC and of Al Jalila Foundation, a not-for-profit organization under Royal Decree.

== See also ==
- List of Free Trade Zones in UAE
- List of company registers
