= Al Murar =

Al Murar المرر
- Community
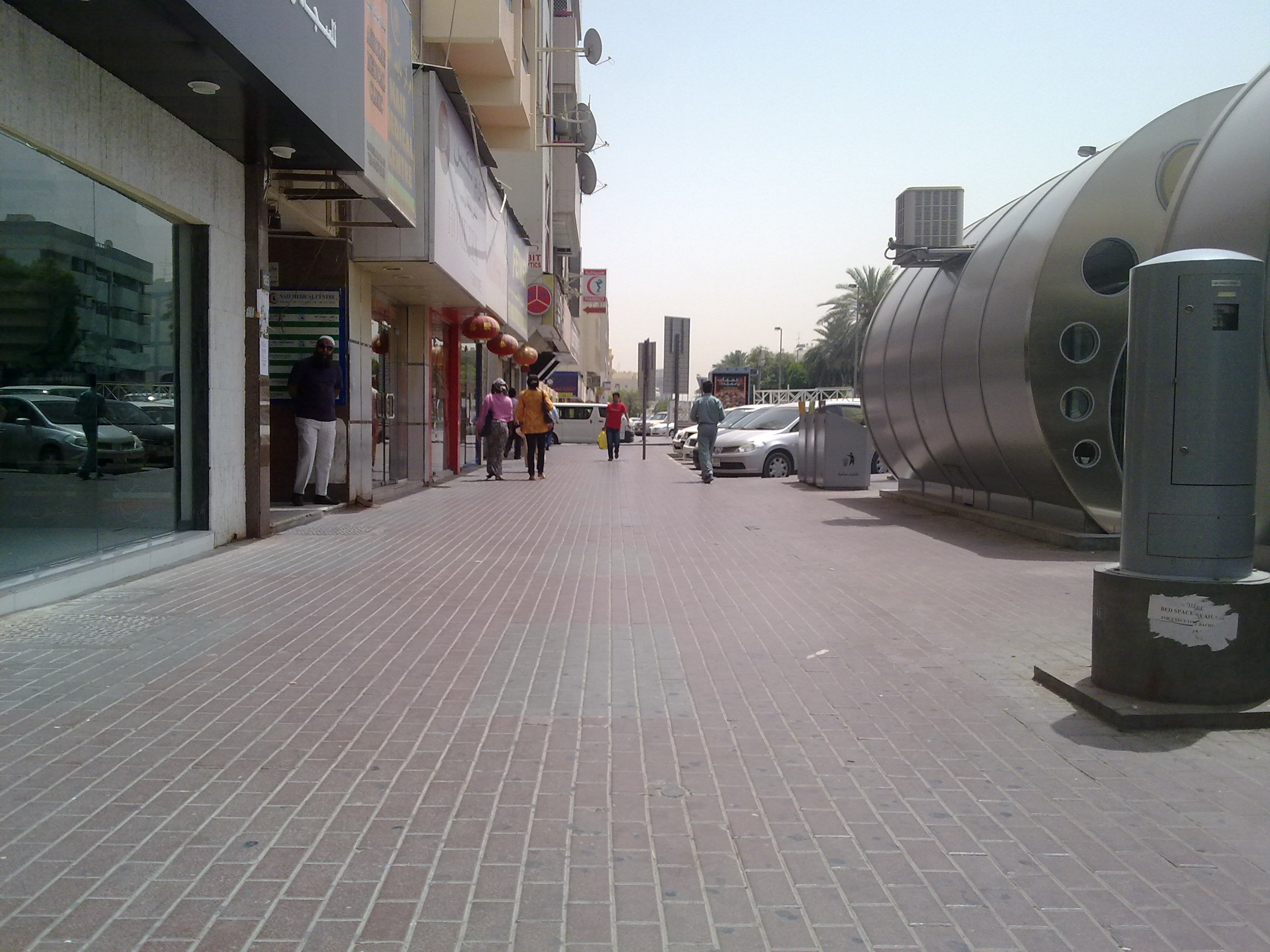
- Naif street on Al Murar
- Interactive map of Al Murar
- Coordinates: 25.27772°N 55.30964°E
- Country: United Arab Emirates
- Emirate: Dubai
- City: Deira, Dubai

Area
  - Total: 0.41 km^{2} (0.16 sq mi)

Population
  - Total: 19,831
  - Density: 48,000/km^{2} (130,000/sq mi)
- Community number: 117

Al Murar (Arabic: المرر), commonly called Freej Al Murar (Arabic: فريج المرر), is a locality in Dubai, United Arab Emirates. Al Murar is located in eastern Dubai in Deira and is bordered by the Deira Corniche in the north, Naif in the south, Ayil Nasir to the west and Al Baraha to the east.

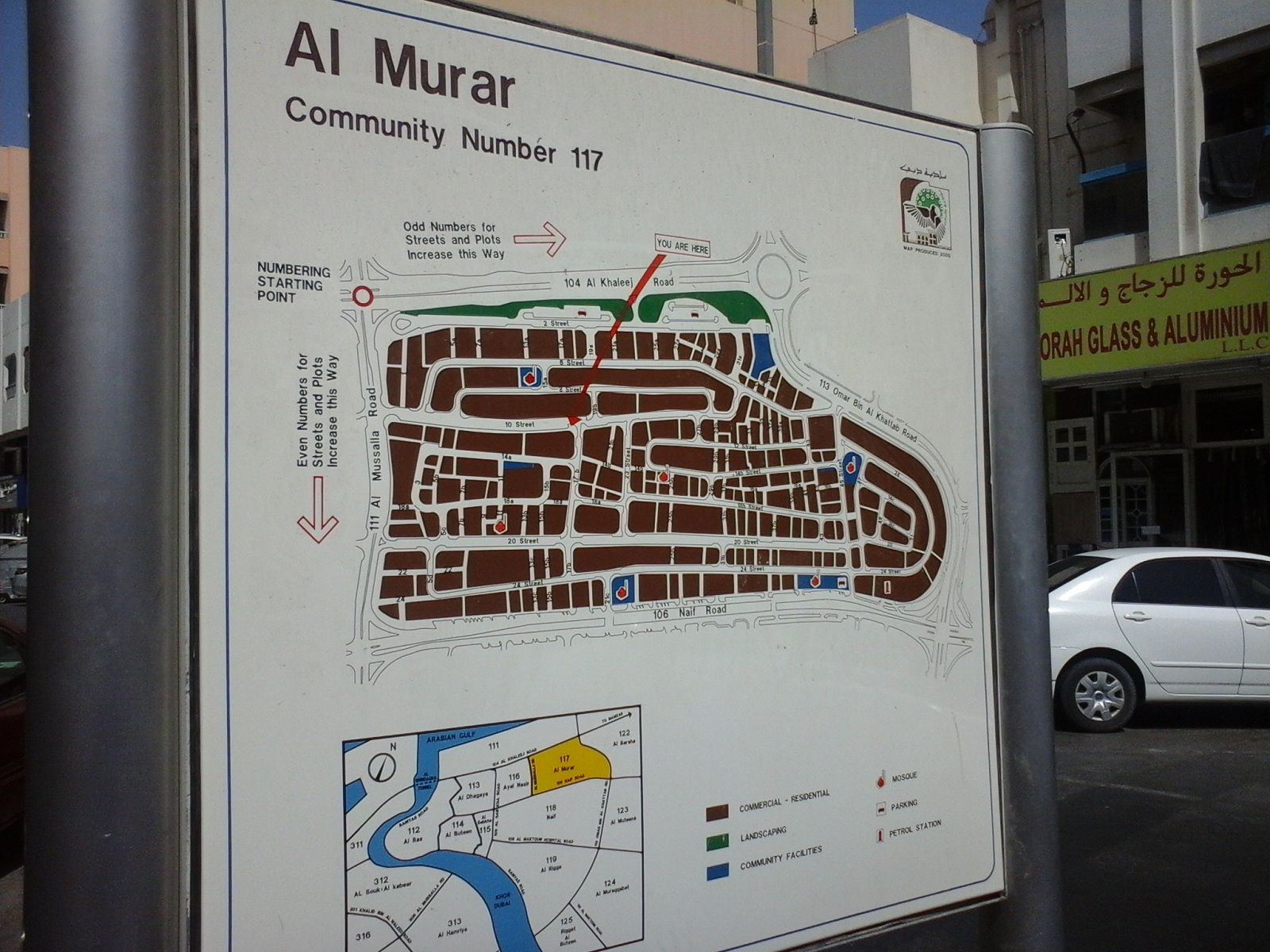
Street Map of Al Murar community, Deira, Dubai

Routes D 92 (Al Khaleej Road) and D 82 (Naif Road) form the northern and southern peripheries around the localities. Al Murar is a residential community in the heart of the Deira central business district.

== History ==
The name of the locality was derived from the name of the Al Marri tribe (Arabic: المري) that settled in the area previously.
