= Al Qiyadah (Dubai Metro) =

Metro station in Dubai, UAE

Al Qiyadah القيادة

General information
- Location: Al Ittihad Road; Al Twar First, Dubai; UAE
- Coordinates: 25.2777°N 55.3528°E
- System: Metro station
- Operator: Dubai Metro
- Line: Green Line
- Platforms: 2
- Tracks: 2
- Connections: RTA Dubai: C9 Al Qiyadah MS. - Satwa Stn.

Other information
- Station code: 16
- Fare zone: 5

History
- Opened: September 9, 2011

Services
Preceding station	Dubai Metro	Following station
Abu Hail towards Creek	Green Line	Stadium towards e&
Location

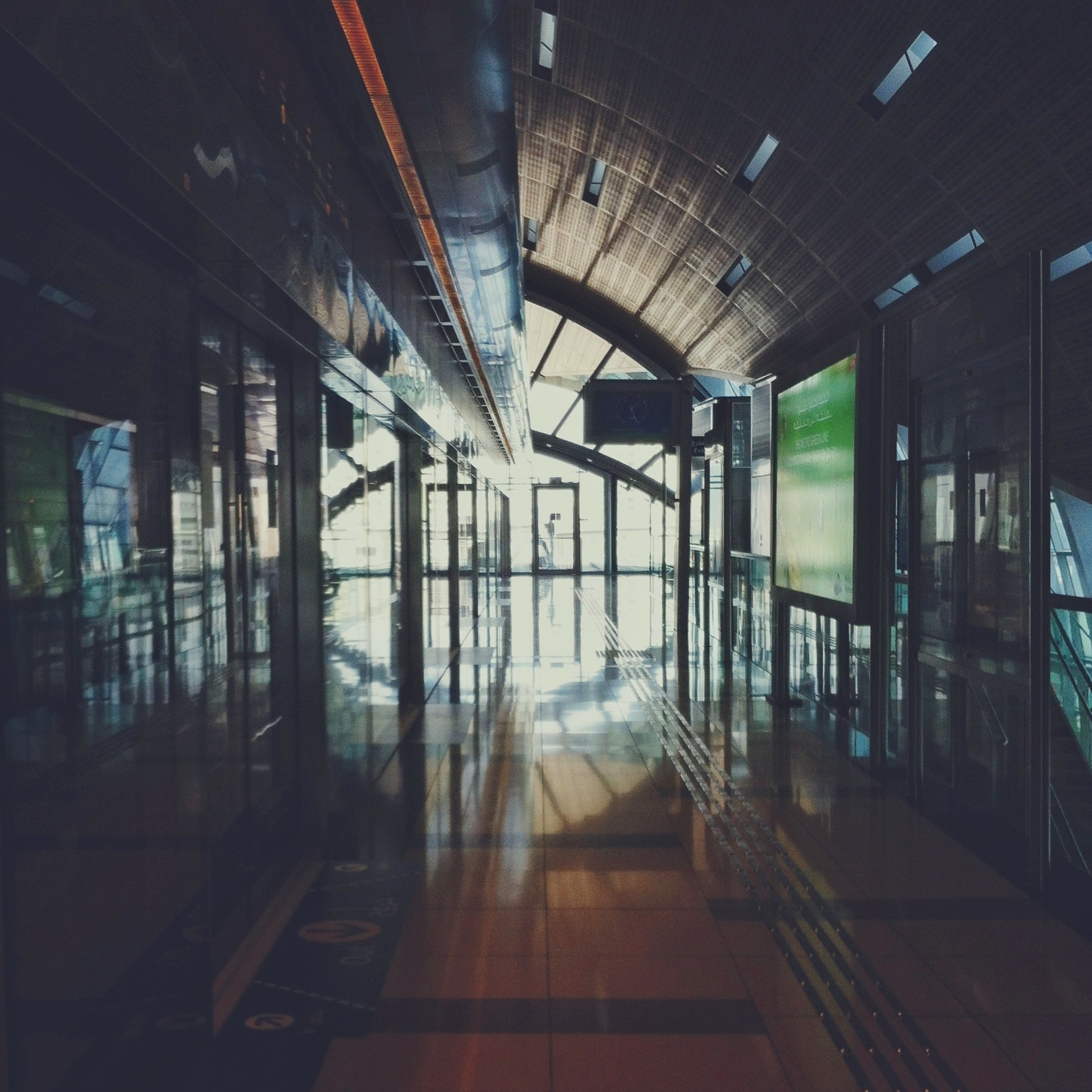
Al Qiyadah Station - Dubai Metro

Al Qiyadah Arabic: القيادة is a rapid transit station on the Green Line of the Dubai Metro in Dubai, UAE.

The station opened as part of the Green Line on 9 September 2011. It has a capacity to handle 11,000 passengers per hour in each direction. The station is located on Al Ittihad Road between the districts of Al Twar and Hor Al Anz.

The station located on Al Ittihad Road and is close to the Al Mulla Plaza and Dubai Police General Headquarters.

== Station Layout ==
G	Street level	Exit/Entrance
L1	Concourse	Automatic Fare Collection gates, station agent, crossover
L2	Side platform | Doors will open on the right
L2	Platform 2 Westbound	Towards ← Creek; Next Station: Abu Hail
L2	Platform 1 Eastbound	Towards → E& Next Station: Stadium
L2	Side platform | Doors will open on the right
