= Al Nahda (Dubai Metro) =

Metro station in Dubai, UAE

Al Nahda النهدة

- View of the station at night

General information
- Location: Al Nahda Street; Al Qusais First, Dubai; United Arab Emirates
- Coordinates: 25.27321°N 55.36946°E
- System: Metro Station
- Operator: Dubai Metro
- Line: Green Line
- Platforms: 2
- Tracks: 2
- Connections: RTA Dubai: 13 Gold Souq Bus Stn - Al Qusais DM Housing; 17 Al Sabkha Bus Stn - Muhaisnah 4, Wasl Oasis 2; 31 Airport Terminal 2 - Oud Al Mateena; 43 Gold Souq Bus Stn - Al Qusais Ind'l Area 2; 64 Gold Souq Bus Stn - Ras Al Khor; F21 Al Nahda MS - Al Nahda 2; F81 Al Qusais Ind'l Area Terminus 1 - Al Nahda MS; X28 Lulu Village - AGORA Mall; C18 Shaikh Rashid Colony - Oud Metha Bus Stn

Construction
- Accessible: yes

Other information
- Station code: 14
- Fare zone: 5

History
- Opened: September 9, 2011

Services
Preceding station	Dubai Metro	Following station
Stadium towards Creek	Green Line	Dubai Airport Free Zone towards e&
Location

Al Nahda (Arabic: النهدة) is a rapid transit station on the Green Line of the Dubai Metro in Dubai, UAE, serving the Al Qusais and Al Twar areas in Deira. The district of Al Nahda itself is around 3/4 mile away.

The station opened as part of the Green Line on 9 September 2011. It is close to the Adab Iranian Private School, Al Kuwait Intermediate Girls School, the Ministry of Energy and Infrastructure, The Westminster School, and the Al Bustan Centre. The station is also close to a number of bus routes.

== Station Layout ==
G	Street level	Exit/Entrance
L1	Concourse	Automatic Fare Collection gates, station agent, crossover
L2	Side platform | Doors will open on the right
L2	Platform 2 Westbound	Towards ← Creek; Next Station: Stadium
L2	Platform 1 Eastbound	Towards → E& Next Station: Dubai Airport Free Zone
L2	Side platform | Doors will open on the right
