= Dubai Airport Free Zone (Dubai Metro) =

Metro station in Dubai, UAE

Dubai Airport Free Zone المنطقة الحرة بمطار دبي

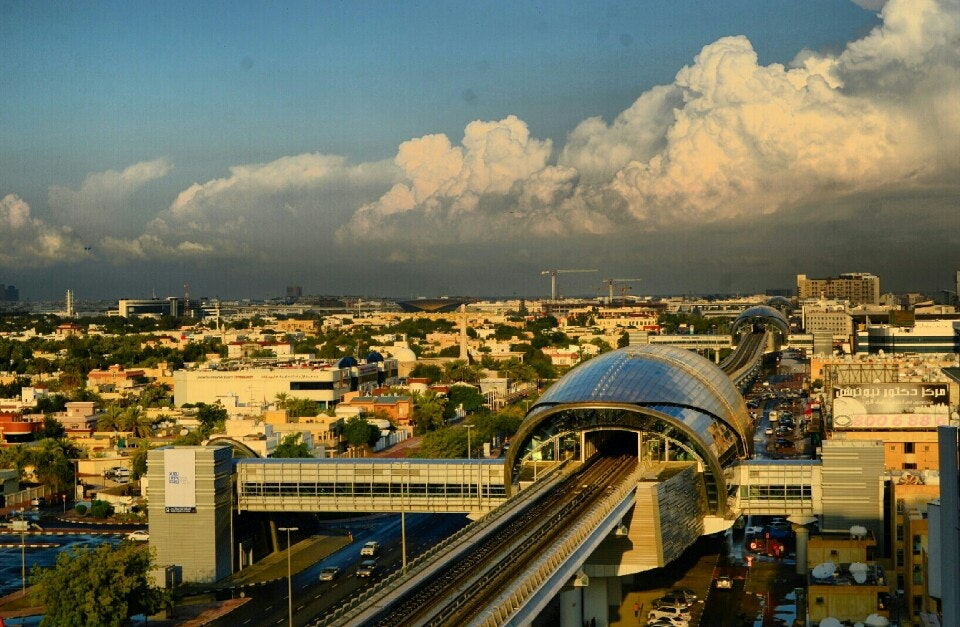
- View of the station

General information
- Location: Al Nahda Street; Al Qusais First, Dubai; United Arab Emirates
- Coordinates: 25.2699°N 55.3750°E
- System: Metro Station
- Operator: Dubai Metro
- Line: Green Line
- Platforms: 2 side platforms
- Tracks: 2
- Connections: RTA Dubai: 13 Gold Souq Bus Stn - Al Qusais DM Housing; 17 Al Sabkha Bus Stn - Muhaisnah 4, Wasl Oasis 2; 31 Airport Terminal 2 - Oud Al Mateena; 43 Gold Souq Bus Stn - Al Qusais Ind'l Area 2; 64 Gold Souq Bus Stn - Ras Al Khor; F81 Al Qusais Ind'l Area Terminus 1 - Al Nahda MS; X28 Lulu Village - AGORA Mall; C18 Shaikh Rashid Colony - Oud Metha Bus Stn

Construction
- Cycle facilities: Bicycle stand available outside the station
- Accessible: yes

Other information
- Station code: 13
- Fare zone: 5

History
- Opened: 10 September 2011; 14 years ago

Services
Preceding station	Dubai Metro	Following station
Al Nahda towards Creek	Green Line	Al Qusais towards e&
Location

Dubai Airport Free Zone (commonly known as DAFZA, Arabic: المنطقة الحرة بمطار دبي) is an elevated rapid-transit metro station on the Green Line of the Dubai Metro in Dubai, UAE.

The station opened as part of the Green Line on 9 September 2011. Like most Dubai Metro stations, it is above ground level. It is located on Al Nahda Street between Al Qusais and Al Twar. It is approximately 1/2 mile from the entrance of the eponymous Dubai Airport Free Zone. The station is also close to a number of bus routes. The station is close to Terminal 2 of Dubai International Airport.

== Station layout ==
G	Street level	Exit/Entrance
L1	Concourse	Automatic Fare Collection gates, station agent, crossover
L2	Side platform | Doors will open on the right
L2	Platform 2 Westbound	Towards ← Creek; Next Station: Al Nahda
L2	Platform 1 Eastbound	Towards → E& Next Station: Al Qusais
L2	Side platform | Doors will open on the right
