= Al Hamriya Port =

Mina Al Hamriya ميناء الحمرية
- Community
- Map of Mina Al Hamriya
- Interactive map of Mina Al Hamriya
- Coordinates: 25.29917°N 55.33408°E
- Country: United Arab Emirates
- Emirate: Dubai
- City: Dubai

Area
  - Total: 0.89 km^{2} (0.34 sq mi)

Population (2000)
  - Total: 83
  - Density: 93/km^{2} (240/sq mi)
- Community number: 131

Mina Al Hamriya (Arabic: ميناء الحمرية, mināʾa al-ḥamrīya), also known as Port Al Hamriya, is a port-locality in Dubai, United Arab Emirates (UAE). Mina Al Hamriya is one of the smaller ports in Dubai; it is located in Deira, off the northeastern coast of the city. Mina Al Hamriya is bordered to the south by Al Waheda and Abu Hail and to the south and east by Al Mamzar. The Palm Deira, once complete, will form the northern periphery of Mina Al Hamriya. The route D 92 (Al Khaleej Road) runs roughly parallel along the locality of Mina Al Hamriya.

In 1975, a Dhs. 20 million (US$ 5.4 million) contract with the Dubai Government was set up to develop Al Hamriya Port. This was partially in response to the increase in commercial activity in Dubai, which put great pressure on the Dubai Creek. The purpose of the port was to handle small fishing ships, as well as to accommodate some of the commercial ships destined for Dubai.

Like all other ports in the city, Mina Al Hamriya is now managed by Dubai Ports World. The port plays a key role in facilitating trade between Dubai and countries in South Asia and East Africa. Food, automobile spare parts, and livestock comprise the bulk of trade through the port. Al Hamriya Port is in the process of being expanded, which includes augmentation of its commercial quay by 2.5 km in two phases.

== See also ==
- Deira Corniche
- Waterfront Market
