= D 80 road (United Arab Emirates) =

D 80
- د ٨٠
- Salahuddin Road

Location
- Country: United Arab Emirates

Highway system
- Transport in the United Arab Emirates; Roads in Dubai

The D 80 (Salahuddin Road) is a road passing in Al Muraqqabat, Al Muteena and Al Khabisi in Dubai, United Arab Emirates. There are four metro stations passing this road, specifically Baniyas Square, Salah Al Din, Abu Baker Al Siddique, and Abu Hail. The road starts in Baniyas Square intersection then ends in the D80-D91 intersection nearby Abu Hail Metro Station
