= Al Nahda, Dubai =

Al Nahda النهدة
- Community
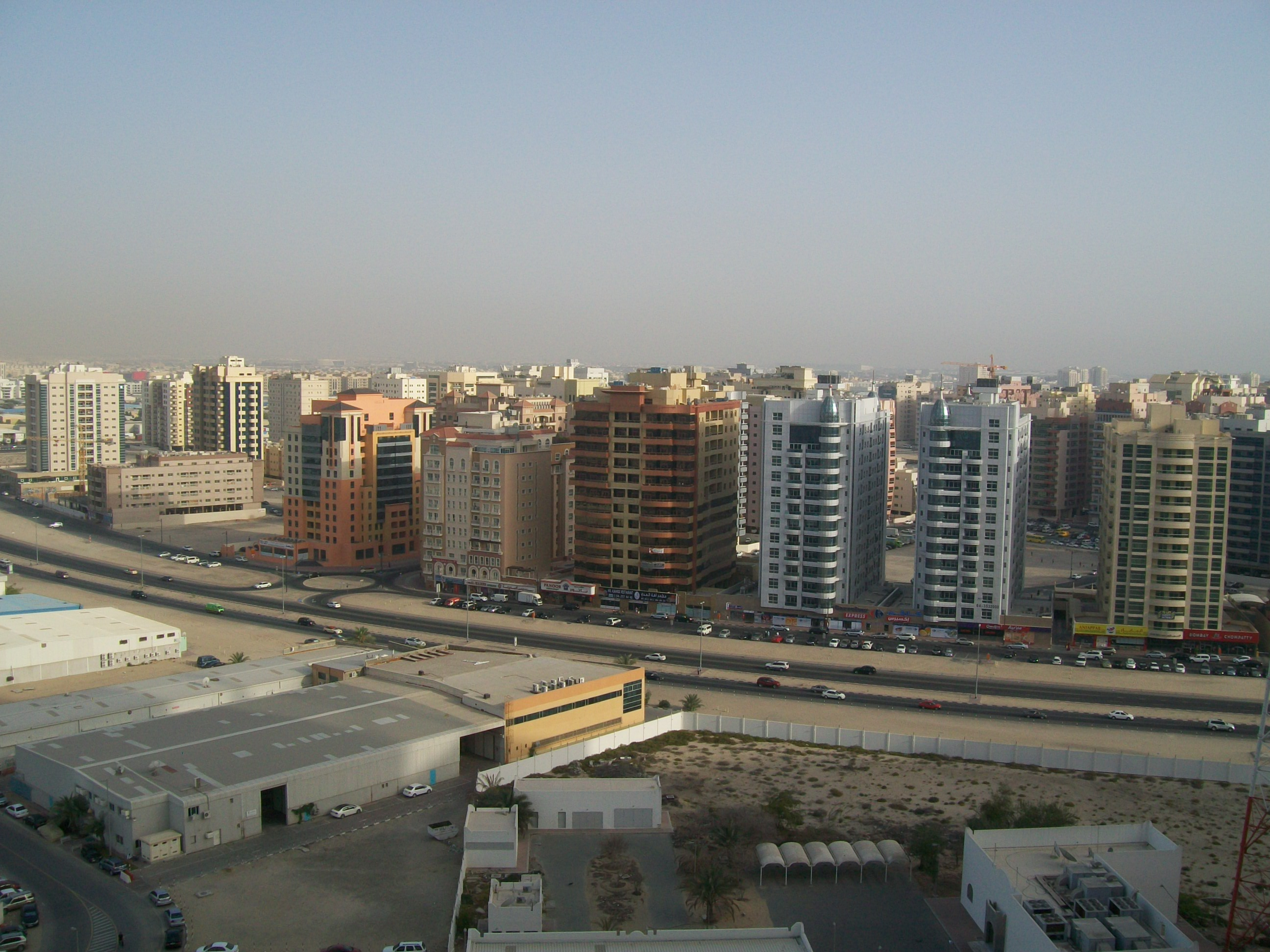
- Buildings in Al Nahda 2

- Location in Dubai Location in the United Arab Emirates
- Coordinates: 25.29398°N 55.37204°E
- Country: United Arab Emirates
- Emirate: Dubai
- City: Dubai
- Boroughs: List: Al Nahda 1; Al Nahda 2

Area
  - Total: 3.18 km^{2} (1.23 sq mi)

Population (2016)
  - Total: 67,215
  - Density: 21,100/km^{2} (54,700/sq mi)

Al Nahda (Arabic: النهدة) is a residential locality in Dubai, United Arab Emirates (UAE). Al Nahda forms part of Dubai's northern border with the emirate of Sharjah. Portions of Al Nahda that flow north into the emirate of Sharjah fall within that emirate's jurisdiction. The area under Dubai's jurisdiction comprises two subcommunities: Al Nahda 1 and Al Nahda 2. Al Nahda is bordered to the south and east by Al Qusais, and to the west by Al Mamzar.

Landmarks include Rashid Stadium, Al Ahli Club, Al Mulla Plaza, Dubai Women's College, Al Nahda Pond Park and Sahara Centre (the largest mall in the emirate of Sharjah). There are numerous private primary and secondary schools in the area.

The area is served by two stations of the Dubai Metro: Al Nahda and Stadium.

== History ==
Construction on the first residential buildings in Dubai's portion of Al Nahda commenced in 2000.
