= Al Muraqqabat =

Al Muraqqabat المرقبات
- Community
- Interactive map of Al Muraqqabat
- Coordinates: 25.26804°N 55.32492°E
- Country: United Arab Emirates
- Emirate: Dubai
- City: Dubai

Area
  - Total: 0.78 km^{2} (0.30 sq mi)

Population (2021)
  - Total: 73,087
  - Density: 94,000/km^{2} (240,000/sq mi)
- Community number: 124

Al Muraqqabat (Arabic: المرقبات), sometimes spelled Al Muraqabat, is a locality in Dubai, United Arab Emirates (UAE). Located in the heart of eastern Dubai in Deira, Al Muraqqabat is bordered by the localities of Al Rigga, Al Muteena, Riggat Al Buteen and Al Khabisi.

Although a predominantly residential area, Al Muraqqabat also has many shopping malls, hotels and restaurants. As a residential area, Al Muraqqabat has the third-highest population density in the city of Dubai (after Ayil Nasir and Naif). The locality is bounded to the north by route D 88 (Omar bin Khattab Road) and to the south by route D78 (United Arab Emirates) (Abu Baker Al Siddique Road). Al Muraqqabat Road divides the locality into two sub-sections, the western flank of which is primarily residential, while the eastern flank is more commercial, with banks, hotels and restaurants located in it.

Like many parts of Deira, Al Muraqqabat is a primarily South Asian community. The locality follows a grid plan, with even-numbered streets running northwest–southeast from D 80 (Salahuddin Road) and ending with D 89 . Odd numbered streets run perpendicular to even-numbered streets in a southwest–northeast direction, beginning with 1st Street in the northern periphery of the locality (near Fish Roundabout), and ending with 45th Street (near Hamarain Centre and route D 78). Al Rigga is a twin locality of Al Muraqqabat as the grid system of local roads from Al Muraqqabat continues to progress into Al Rigga. Al Rigga is an important centre of festivals and shopping during the Dubai Shopping Festival (DSF). Al Rigga and Al Muraqqabat typically hosts kiosks in retail outlets and children's entertainment park, during DSF and Dubai Summer Surprises.

== Landmarks ==
Fish Roundabout, located at the northwestern periphery of Al Muraqqabat is an important landmark in Deira. Additionally, other landmarks in the locality include Al Ghurair Center, Hamarain Centre, Warba Centre, Al Muraqqabat Police Station, the head offices of Mashreq Bank and Al-Futtaim Group, Ansar Gallery departmental store and Reef Mall.

== History ==
Al Muraqqabat is home to the country's first mall, Al Ghurair Centre, and the first McDonald's branch. Built in 1981, both continue to thrive to this day and have undergone renovations in recent years and is now a 620-room large property.
