= Abu Baker Al Siddique (Dubai Metro) =

Metro station in Dubai, UAE

Abu Baker Al Siddique أبو بكر الصديق

General information
- Location: Salah Al Din Street; Hor Al Anz, Dubai; United Arab Emirates
- Coordinates: 25.270981°N 55.33305°E
- System: Metro Station
- Operator: Dubai Metro
- Line: Green Line
- Platforms: 2
- Tracks: 2
- Connections: RTA Dubai: 13 Gold Souq Stn. - Al Qusais DM Housing; 13A Gold Souq Stn. - Al Qusais Stn.; 43 Gold Souq Stn. - Al Qusais Ind'l Area 2; X28 Lulu Village - Dubai Internet City MS

Other information
- Station code: 18
- Fare zone: 5

History
- Opened: September 9, 2011

Services
| Preceding station | Dubai Metro | Following station |
|---|---|---|
| Salah Al Din towards Creek | Green Line | Abu Hail towards e& |
Location

Abu Baker Al Siddique (Arabic: أبو بكر الصديق) is a rapid transit station on the Green Line of the Dubai Metro in the Deira area of Dubai, UAE.

The station opened as part of the Green Line on 9 September 2011.

The station is close to the Hamarain Centre and the KIMS Medical Center. The station is also close to a number of bus routes. Beyond this station, the metro line goes underground.

== Station Layout ==
| G | Street level | Exit/Entrance |
| L1 | Concourse | Automatic Fare Collection gates, station agent, crossover |
| L2 | Side platform | Doors will open on the right |
| L2 | Platform 2 Westbound | Towards ← Creek; Next Station: Salah Al Din |
| L2 | Platform 1 Eastbound | Towards → E& Next Station: Abu Hail |
| L2 | Side platform | Doors will open on the right |

== See also ==
- Abu Bakr (name)
