= Al Khabisi =

Area in Dubai, UAE

Al Khabaisi ٱلْخَبَيْصِي
- Community
- Interactive map of Al Khabaisi
- Coordinates: 25°16′14.81″N 55°20′11.62″E
- Country: United Arab Emirates
- Emirate: Dubai
- City: Dubai

Area
  - Total: 1.255 km^{2} (0.485 sq mi)

Population (2000)
  - Total: 6,737
  - Density: 5,368/km^{2} (13,900/sq mi)
- Community number: 128

Al Khabaisi (Arabic: ٱلْخَبَيْصِي, romanized: Al-Khabayṣī) is a locality in Dubai, United Arab Emirates It is located in Deira in the eastern part of the city. The community borders Hor Al Anz to the north, Dubai International Airport to the south, Al Muraqqabat to the west and Al Twar to the east.

== Description ==
Al Khabaisi is bounded in the north by route D 80 (Salahuddin Road) and to the south by route E 11 (Al Ittihad Road). Al Khabaisi is a largely a residential community. However, several corporations and automobile dealerships are located in Al Khabaisi, along Al Ittihad Road. The area is also close to the Hor Al Anz bus stand and New Medical Center.
