= Al Rigga =

Al Rigga الرقة
- Community
- Interactive map of Al Rigga
- Coordinates: 25.26325°N 55.31994°E
- Country: United Arab Emirates
- Emirate: Emirate of Dubai
- City: Dubai

Area
  - Total: 0.89 km^{2} (0.34 sq mi)

Population (2016)
  - Total: 8,222
  - Density: 9,200/km^{2} (24,000/sq mi)
- Community number: 119

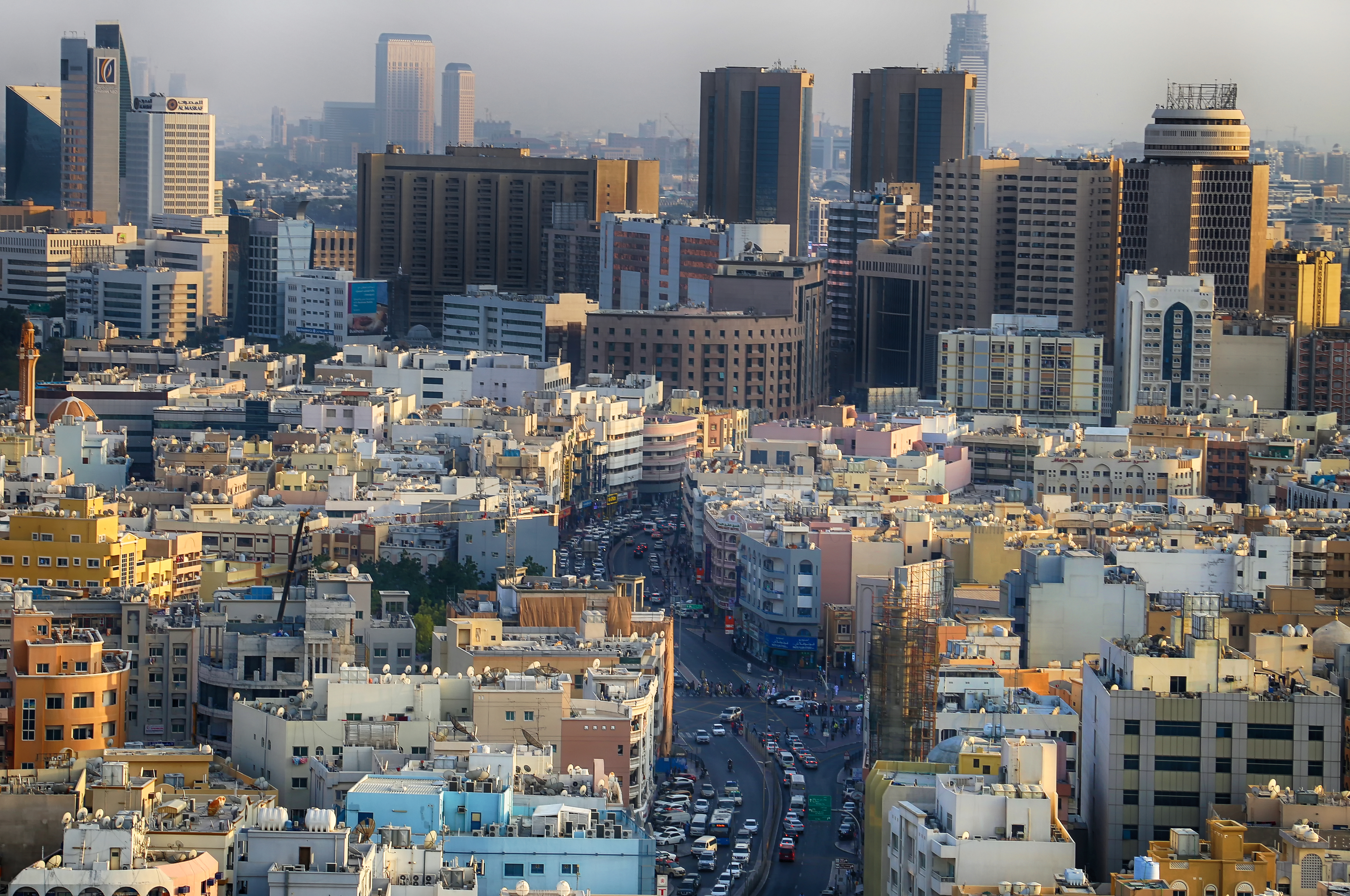
Al Rigga/Al Riqqa

Al Rigga or Al Riqqa (Arabic: الرقة) is a locality in Dubai, United Arab Emirates (UAE). Located in the heart of eastern Dubai in Deira, Al Rigga is a residential and commercial centre. Al Rigga is bordered by Al Sabkha, Al Muraqqabat and Naif and bounded to the south by Dubai Creek.

Al Rigga is bounded in the east by route D 88 (Omar bin Khattab Road) and to the east by route D 89 (Al Maktoum Road). Local roads in Al Rigga follow a grid pattern, continuing in numerical sequence from those of Al Muraqqabat. Even-numbered streets progress northeast–southwest, beginning with 2nd Street (near Bani Yas Cemetery) and ending with 44th A Street (near Rigga Al Buteen Plaza). Additionally, several international hotels such as the Radisson Blu, Carlton and Riviera hotels are located in Al Rigga.

Both Al Rigga and Al Muraqqabat play a central role in the Dubai Shopping Festival (DSF) celebrations. Planet Pepsi, a DSF entertainment park, is located in Al Rigga.

== Landmarks ==
=== Deira Clocktower ===
Deira Clocktower was built in the early 1960s as a symbol of Dubai. The roundabout in Al Rigga has the tower at its core and it was the most famous landmark in the then-smaller city. In technical terms it is the oldest ‘monument’ in modern Dubai. By sheer usage it became known as the Deira Clocktower. The tower has held its own even as it was dwarfed by the construction around it. It enjoys a certain affection with the public and even as traffic swirls around it from different flyovers and turnoffs, the tower is still referred to as an important landmark.

== Transport ==
The Union Square, where buses and taxis provide transport within the emirate as well as to other emirates in the country, is located in Al Rigga. The area is served by the Al Rigga, Baniyas Square and Union metro stations.
