= Al Muteena =

Al Muteena المطينة
- Community
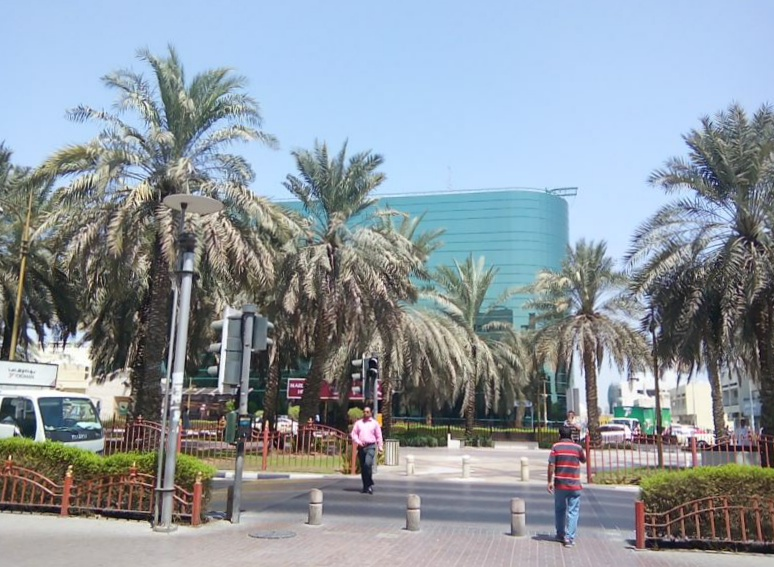
- Al Muteena
- Interactive map of Al Muteena
- Coordinates: 25.27575°N 55.32230°E
- Country: United Arab Emirates
- Emirate: Emirate of Dubai
- City: Dubai
- Area: Deira

Area
  - Total: 1.12 km^{2} (0.43 sq mi)

Population (2000)
  - Total: 18,094
  - Density: 16,200/km^{2} (41,800/sq mi)
- Community number: 123

Al Muteena (Arabic: المطينة) is a locality in Dubai, United Arab Emirates. It is located in Deira.

Al Muteena is bordered in the north by Al Baraha, in the south by Al Muraqqabat, in the west by Naif and in the east by Hor Al Anz. The routes D 80 (Al Maktoum Road), D 88 (Omar bin Khattab Road), D 78 (Abu Baker Al Siddique Road) and D 82 (Al Rasheed Road) form a periphery around the locality. Al Muteena Street (14th Street) divides Al Muteena into roughly equal subcommunities.

== Al Muteena Park ==
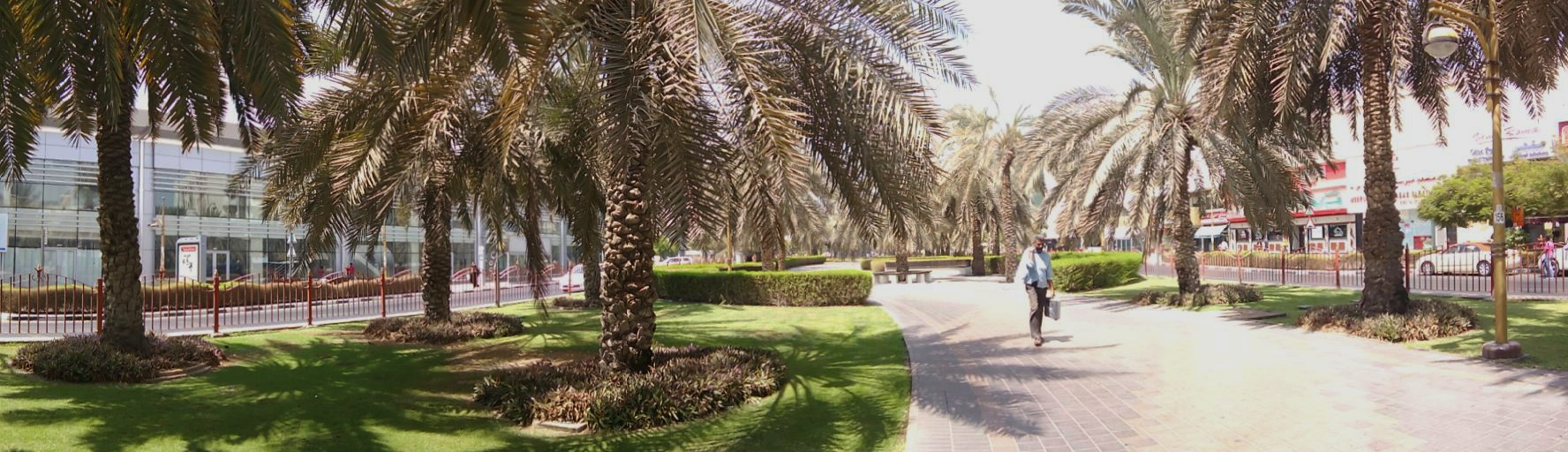
Al Muteena Park

Al Muteena Park is a public park located between the urban center of Al Muteena. The park is surrounded by multiple commercial shops as well as hotels including Renaissance Hotel and Marco Polo Hotel.

The park includes a pathway lined with date palms, greenery, and seasonal flowers. The park has a jogging track, a children's play area, and amenities such as public restrooms and water drinking facilities.
