= Abu Hail (Dubai Metro) =

Metro station in Dubai

Abu Hail أبو هيل

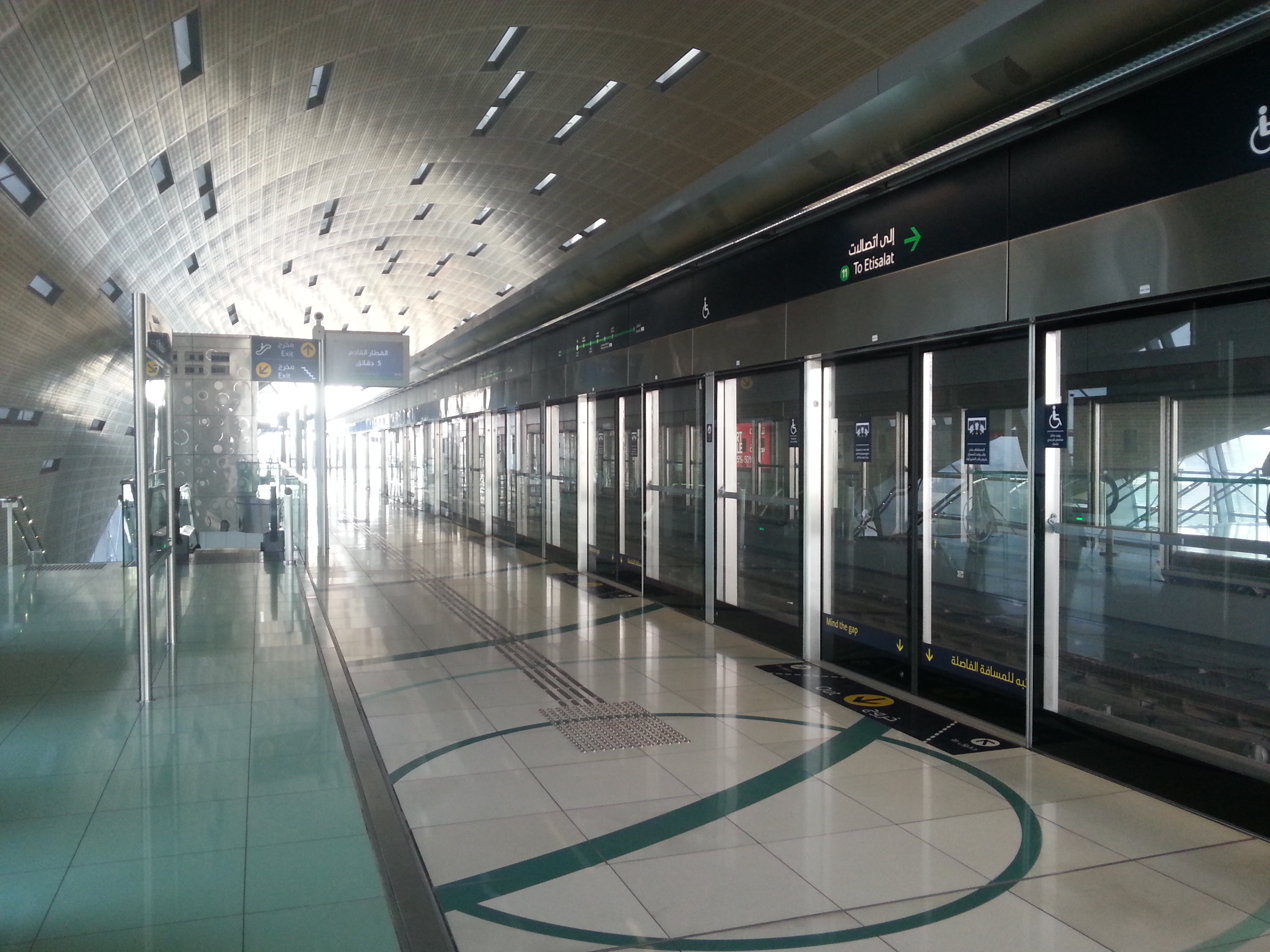
- Platform view

General information
- Location: Salah Al Din Street; Hor Al Anz, Dubai; United Arab Emirates
- Coordinates: 25°16′31″N 55°20′47″E
- System: Metro Station
- Operator: Dubai Metro
- Line: Green Line
- Platforms: 2
- Tracks: 2
- Connections: RTA Dubai: 5 Abu Hail Stn. - Union Stn.; 43 Gold Souq Stn. - Al Qusais Ind'l Area 2; C3 Abu Hail Stn. - Al Karama Stn.; C9 Satwa Stn. - Al Qiyadah MS; E307 Abu Hail Stn. - Sharjah, Jubail Stn.

Other information
- Station code: 17
- Fare zone: 5

History
- Opened: September 9, 2011

Services
Preceding station	Dubai Metro	Following station
Abu Baker Al Siddique towards Creek	Green Line	Al Qiyadah towards e&
Location

Abu Hail (Arabic: أبو هيل) is a rapid transit station on the Green Line of the Dubai Metro in Dubai, UAE, serving the Hor Al Anz areas in Deira. The district of Abu Hail itself is north of Hor Al Anz.

The station opened as part of the Green Line on 9 September 2011. It is close to the eponymous Abu Hail Center and the Pearl Wisdom School Dubai. The station is also close to a number of bus routes.

== Station Layout ==
G	Street level	Exit/Entrance
L1	Concourse	Automatic Fare Collection gates, station agent, crossover
L2	Side platform | Doors will open on the right
L2	Platform 2 Westbound	Towards ← Creek; Next Station: Abu Baker Al Siddique
L2	Platform 1 Eastbound	Towards → E& Next Station: Al Qiyadah
L2	Side platform | Doors will open on the right
