= Al Waheda =

Al Waheda الوحيدة
- Community
- Interactive map of Al Waheda
- Coordinates: 25.29117°N 55.336869°E
- Country: United Arab Emirates
- Emirate: Dubai
- City: Dubai

Area
  - Total: 1.41 km^{2} (0.54 sq mi)

Population (2000)
  - Total: 9,856
  - Density: 6,990/km^{2} (18,100/sq mi)
- Community number: 132

Al Waheda (Arabic: الوحيدة) is a locality in Dubai, United Arab Emirates (UAE). Located in eastern Dubai in Deira, Al Waheda is bordered to the north by Al Hamriya Port, to the west by Abu Hail, to the east by Al Mamzar, and to the south by Hor Al Anz. The routes D 92 (Al Khaleej Road) and D 89 (Al Rasheed Road) form the northern and southern peripheries of Al Waheda.

Al Waheda, literally meaning The One, is primarily a residential community with a mix of low-rise apartments and independent villas and town homes. The consulates of the Philippines and Syria are located in Al Waheda.
