= Abu Hail =

Abu Hail أبو هيل
- Community
- Interactive map of Abu Hail
- Coordinates: 25.27651°N 55.34592°E
- Country: United Arab Emirates
- Emirate: Dubai
- City: Dubai

Area
  - Total: 1.27 km^{2} (0.49 sq mi)

Population
  - Total: 21,414
  - Density: 16,900/km^{2} (43,700/sq mi)
- Community number: 126

Abu Hail (Arabic: أبو هيل) is a neighbourhood in Dubai, United Arab Emirates (UAE), located in Deira. The locality is largely residential and is bordered by the localities of Al Waheda on the east, Hor Al Anz in the south and Al Baraha on the west.

The Abu Hail Shopping Centre and Dubai Labour Office are located in Abu Hail.

Abu Hail has a Metro Station on the Green Line of the Dubai Metro in Dubai, UAE.

== History ==
Abu Hail is mentioned in the 1830 British survey of the Trucial Coast: "Aboo Heyle is a small village situated about three miles to the SW of Sharjah, on the same creek with Khan village, on the other bank. They jointly contain about two hundred and fifty inhabitants, of various tribles, mostly fishermen, and are subject to Sharjah." A slightly earlier survey, under Captain Robert Taylor, has the village 'under Sheikh Ali Mohamed of the tribe Matarish'.

The settlement and port of Abu Hail were bombarded on 18 January 1820 by British forces during the Persian Gulf campaign of 1819, following the fall of Ras Al Khaimah. The action resulted in the General Maritime Treaty of 1820, which led to the recognition of the coastal emirates as the Trucial States and, eventually, to the formation of the United Arab Emirates in December 1971.

By the turn of the 20th century, Abu Hail was effectively abandoned and only occupied, by people from both Al Khan and Dubai, during the date harvest.

== Metro Station ==
Abu Hail (Arabic: أبو هيل) is a Metro station on the Green Line of the Dubai Metro in Dubai, UAE, serving the Abu Hail and Hor Al Anz areas in Deira.

The station opened as part of the Green Line on 9 September 2011. It is close to the Abu Hail Center and the Pearl Wisdom School Dubai. The station is also close to a number of bus routes.

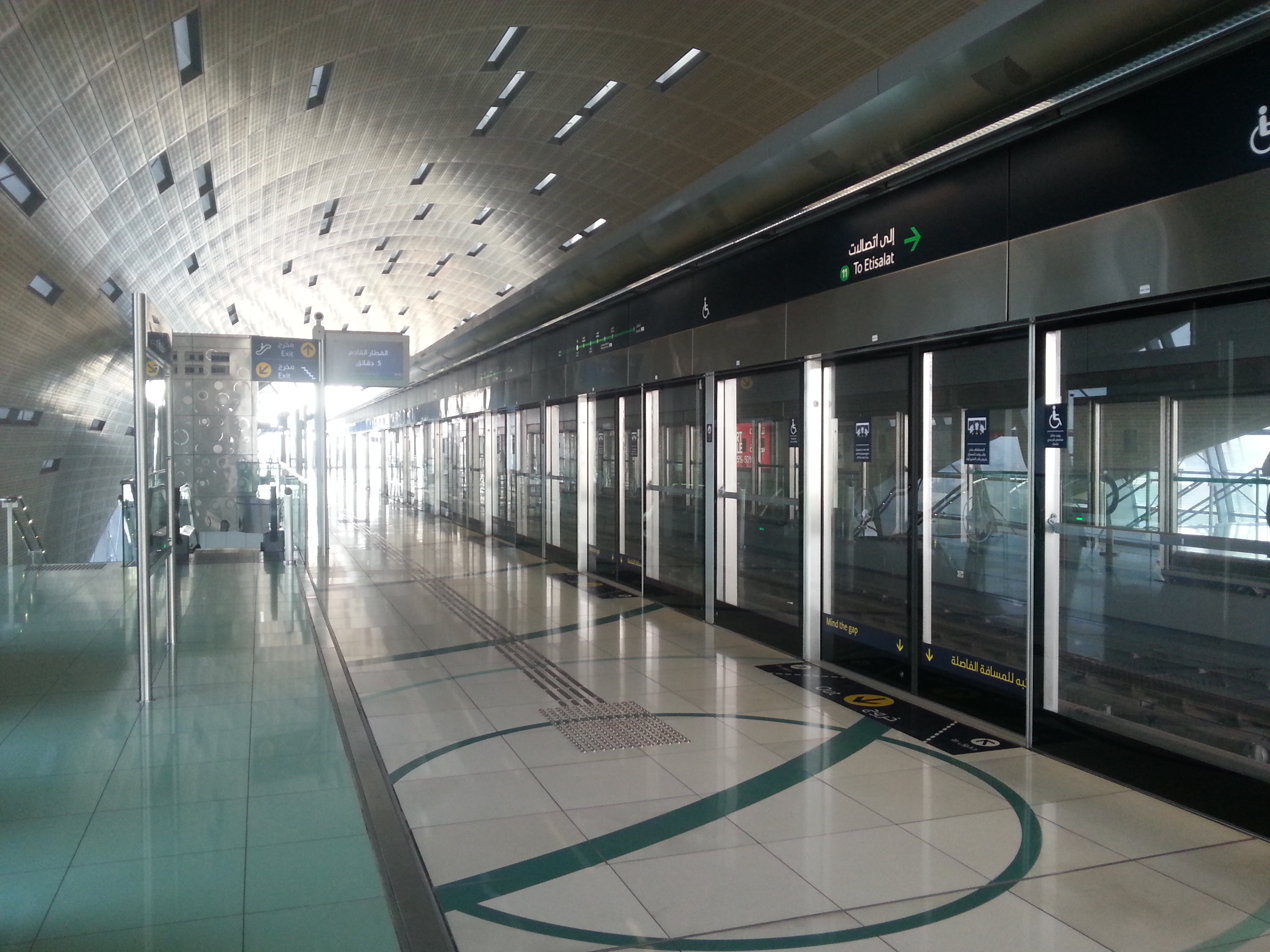
Abu Hail Metro Station, Dubai.
