= Port Saeed =

Port Saeed بور سعيد
- Community
- Interactive map of Port Saeed
- Coordinates: 25°15′11″N 55°19′45″E
- Country: United Arab Emirates
- Emirate: Dubai
- City: Dubai

Area
  - Total: 1.84 km^{2} (0.71 sq mi)

Population (2016)
  - Total: 11,142
  - Density: 6,060/km^{2} (15,700/sq mi)
- Community number: 129

Port Saeed (Arabic: بور سعيد and sometimes ميناء سعيد) is a locality in Dubai, United Arab Emirates. It was established by Saeed Ahmed Lootah, who named it after the Egyptian city of Port Said which was destroyed in the Anglo-French invasion during the Suez Crisis.

Port Saeed is bordered by the waters of Dubai Creek to the south, by Al Khabisi to the north, by Al Garhoud to the east, and by Rigga Al Buteen to the west. It stretches between Al Garhoud Bridge and Al Maktoum Bridge. Important landmarks in Port Saeed include Deira City Centre and Dubai Creek Golf and Yacht Club.

The Dubai Creek Golf and Yacht Club occupies almost half the area of Port Saeed. Located there are a sail-shaped club house, an 18-hole golf course, a marina, a number of villas, several creek-side restaurants, and the Park Hyatt Dubai Hotel.

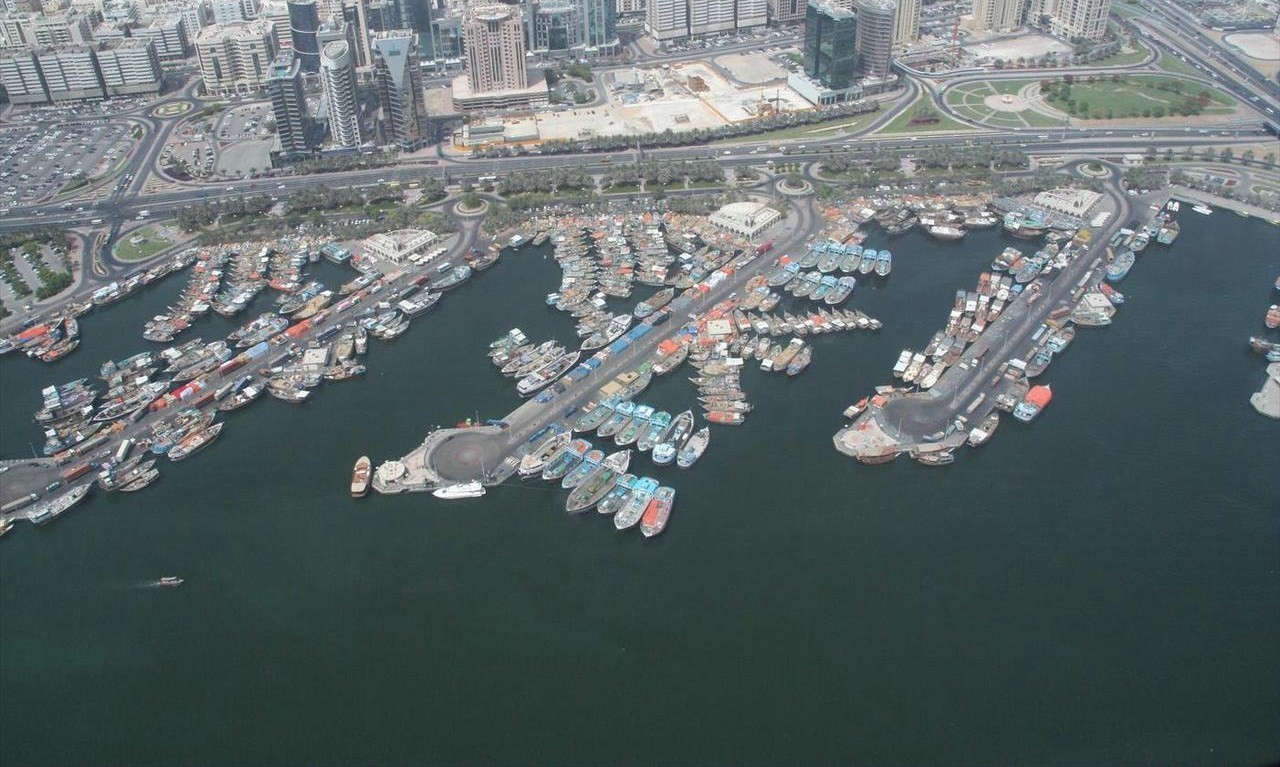
Port Saeed on 1 May 2007

Port Saeed has a small residential neighbourhood that was redesigned by Dubai Municipality after 2003. As a result, several new buildings were built in the area.
