= Al Qusais (Dubai Metro) =

Metro station in Dubai, UAE

Al Qusais اﻟﻘﺼﻴﺺ

- A view of Dubai and the DAFZA metro station from Al-Qusais metro station, April 2022

General information
- Location: Al Nahda Road; Al Qusais Second, Dubai; United Arab Emirates
- Coordinates: 25.262625°N 55.387414°E
- System: Metro station
- Operator: Dubai Metro
- Line: Green Line
- Platforms: 2
- Tracks: 2
- Connections: RTA Dubai: 13 Gold Souq Bus Stn - Al Qusais DM Housing; 31 Airport Terminal 2 - Oud Al Mateena; 62 Al Qusais Ind'l Area 5 - Ras Al Khor Vegetable Market; 64 Gold Souq Bus Stn - Ras Al Khor

Other information
- Station code: 12
- Fare zone: 5

History
- Opened: September 9, 2011

Services
Preceding station	Dubai Metro	Following station
Dubai Airport Free Zone towards Creek	Green Line	E& towards e&
Location

Al Qusais (Arabic: اﻟﻘﺼﻴﺺ) is a rapid transit station on the Green Line of the Dubai Metro in Dubai, United Arab Emirates, serving the Al Qusais and Al Twar areas in Deira.

The station opened as part of the Green Line on 9 September 2011. It is close to the Al Salam Community School (ASCS) and the Al Qusais Police Station. The station is also close to a number of bus routes.

== Station Layout ==
G	Street level	Exit/Entrance
L1	Concourse	Automatic Fare Collection gates, station agent, crossover
L2	Side platform | Doors will open on the right
L2	Platform 2 Westbound	Towards ← Creek; Next Station: Dubai Airport Free Zone
L2	Platform 1 Eastbound	Towards → E&
L2	Side platform | Doors will open on the right
