= D80 =

D80 may refer to:

- Grünfeld Defence, Encyclopaedia of Chess Openings code
- HMS Barfleur (D80), a 1943 British Royal Navy Battle-class destroyer
- HMS Hunter (D80), a 1942 British Royal Navy Bogue-class escort aircraft carrier
- HMS Sheffield (D80), a 1971 British Royal Navy Type 42 Guided Missile Destroyer
- Nikon D80, a 2006 digital single-lens reflex camera model
- D 80 road (United Arab Emirates), a road passing in Dubai Emirate

and also :

- the ICD-10 code for an immunodeficiency with predominantly antibody defects
