= Salah Al Din (Dubai Metro) =

Metro station in Dubai, UAE

Salah Al Din صلاح الدين

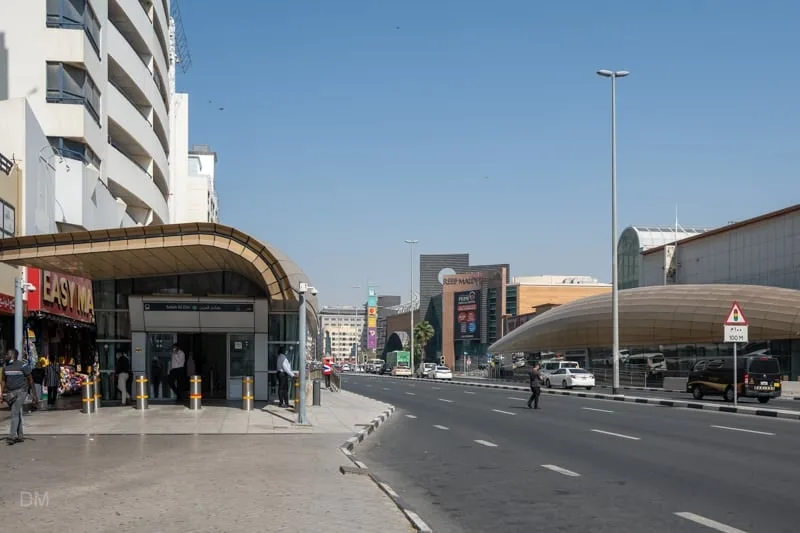

General information
- Location: Salah Al Din Street; Al Muteena, Dubai; United Arab Emirates
- Coordinates: 25.27032°N 55.32083°E
- System: Metro Station
- Operator: Dubai Metro
- Line: Green Line Green Line
- Platforms: 2
- Tracks: 2
- Connections: RTA Dubai: 10 Gold Souq Stn. - Al Quoz Stn.; 13 Gold Souq Stn. - Al Qusais DM Housing; 13A Gold Souq Stn. - Al Qusais Stn.; 43 Gold Souq Stn. - Al Qusais Ind'l Area 2; C28 Al Baraha Stn. - Mamzar, Beach Park; E303 Union Stn. - Sharjah, Jubail Stn.

Construction
- Structure type: Underground

Other information
- Station code: 19
- Fare zone: 5

History
- Opened: September 9, 2011

Services
Preceding station	Dubai Metro	Following station
Union towards Creek	Green Line	Abu Baker Al Siddique towards e&
Location

Salah Al Din (Arabic: صلاح الدين) is a rapid transit station on the Green Line of the Dubai Metro in the Deira area of Dubai, UAE.

The station opened as part of the Green Line on 9 September 2011.

The station is close to the Reef Mall and Al Ghurair Center. The station is also close to a number of bus routes.

== Station layout ==
G	Street level	Exit/Entrance
L1	Concourse	Automatic Fare Collection gates, station agent, crossover
L2	Side platform | Doors will open on the right
L2	Platform 2 Westbound	Towards ← Creek; Next Station: Union; Change at the next station for M1
L2	Platform 1 Eastbound	Towards → E& Next Station: Abu Baker Al Siddique
L2	Side platform | Doors will open on the right

== See also ==
- Abu Bakr (name)
- Salah Al Din
