= Al Qusais =

Al Qusais اﻟﻘﺼﻴﺺ
- Community
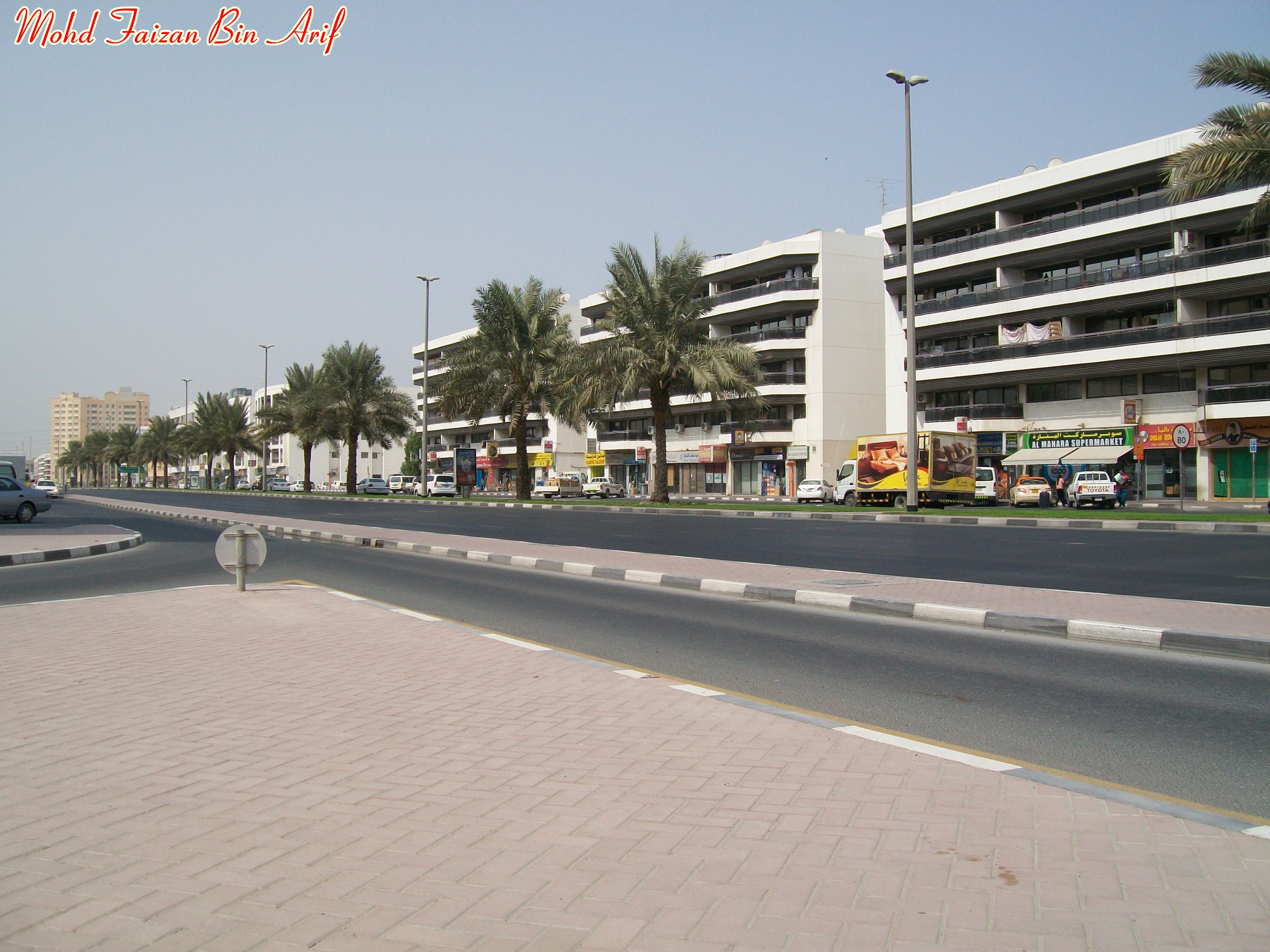
- Buildings in Al Qusais
- Interactive map of Al Qusais
- Coordinates: 25.278°N 55.372°E
- Country: United Arab Emirates
- Emirate: Dubai
- City: Dubai
- Boroughs: List: Al Qusais First; Al Qusais Industrial First; Al Qusais Industrial Second; Al Qusais Industrial Third; Al Qusais Industrial Fourth; Al Qusais Industrial Fifth

Population (2016)
  - Total: 63,532
- Community number: 232, 242, 243, 246, 247, 248

Al Qusais (Arabic: اﻟﻘﺼﻴﺺ) is a community in Dubai, United Arab Emirates. It is located in the Deira area of east Dubai and forms part of Dubai's northern border with the emirate of Sharjah. Al Qusais borders the localities of Al Nahda, Al Twar and Muhaisnah and is further subdivided into one residential (Al Qusais) and five industrial (Al Qusais Industrial Area) localities.

== Education ==
Education in Al Qusais is provided by a number of public and private schools and colleges. There are Arabic, Australian, British, American and Indian schools. There are also various private institutes providing dance, music, art and computer lessons.

== Transportation ==
The Green Line of the Dubai Metro network has five stations situated in Al Qusais. The Etisalat depot station has a parking area which can house 60 trains. The other stations are Al Qusais, Dubai Airport Free Zone, Al Nahda and Stadium. Terminal 2 of Dubai International Airport is 4 kilometres away from the Dubai Airport Free Zone metro station.

== Government Organisations ==
Al Qusais Police Station is one of the ten police stations in Dubai and was founded in 1977. It moved to new premises on Beirut Street in 1999. The Ministry of Education, Ministry of Labour, Ministry of Information, Ministry of Energy & Infrastructure, and Dubai Civil Defence Headquarters are also located in the community.
