= Hyatt Regency Dubai =

Hotel in Dubai, UAE

- Interactive map of the Hyatt Regency Dubai area

General information
- Location: Dubai, United Arab Emirates
- Coordinates: 25.27906327477°N 55.30418872833°E
- Opening: 1980
- Operator: Hyatt Hotels Corporation

Design and construction
- Architect: Garry Whitney

Other information
- Number of rooms: 421
- Number of restaurants: 3

The Hyatt Regency Dubai is a luxury, five-star hotel located on Deira Corniche in Dubai, United Arab Emirates. It is the first Hyatt Hotel in UAE. It has 421 rooms and an additional complex of 388 apartments called The Galleria Residence.

== History ==
Plans for the Hyatt Regency Dubai emerged in November 1976, originally as a hotel with 475 rooms, suites, and more than 400 apartments. It was also first set to have a revolving restaurant on the 29th floor, night club, theatre, restaurants and a sports and recreation centre. The construction of the hotel began in 1977 backed by the Sheikh Rashid bin Saeed Al Maktoum, the Ruler of Dubai. It was opened to the public on 5 May 1980. Frank Kelly Design Architect, Emad Khaja Project Architect, Resident Architect, Garry Whitney, Interiors, Project Associate, Ben Worley of the design house ‘3D International’ of Houston, Texas designed the building for Abdul Wahab Galadari. Contractors were Cementation International, a subsidiary of the Trafalgar House Group headed by Mike Slater of Great Britain.

== Overview ==
The property is built over 700,352 sq ft (65,065 m^{2}). It is one of the first steel buildings in Dubai. The Structural Consultant was Joe Colaco, and it has been built to U.S. Building Standards in all aspects. Interior Designer & NOT the Architect was Gary Whitney. It has luxury meeting & conventions space of 20,032 sq ft (1,861 m^{2}). The hotel has 3 restaurants including Al Dawaar (revolving restaurant), Miyako (Japanese) and The Kitchen (international). 4 bars include Hibiki Karaoke Lounge, Carpenter's Bar, The Bar & Pool Bar.
