= Stadium (Dubai Metro) =

Metro station in Dubai, UAE

Stadium الاستاد

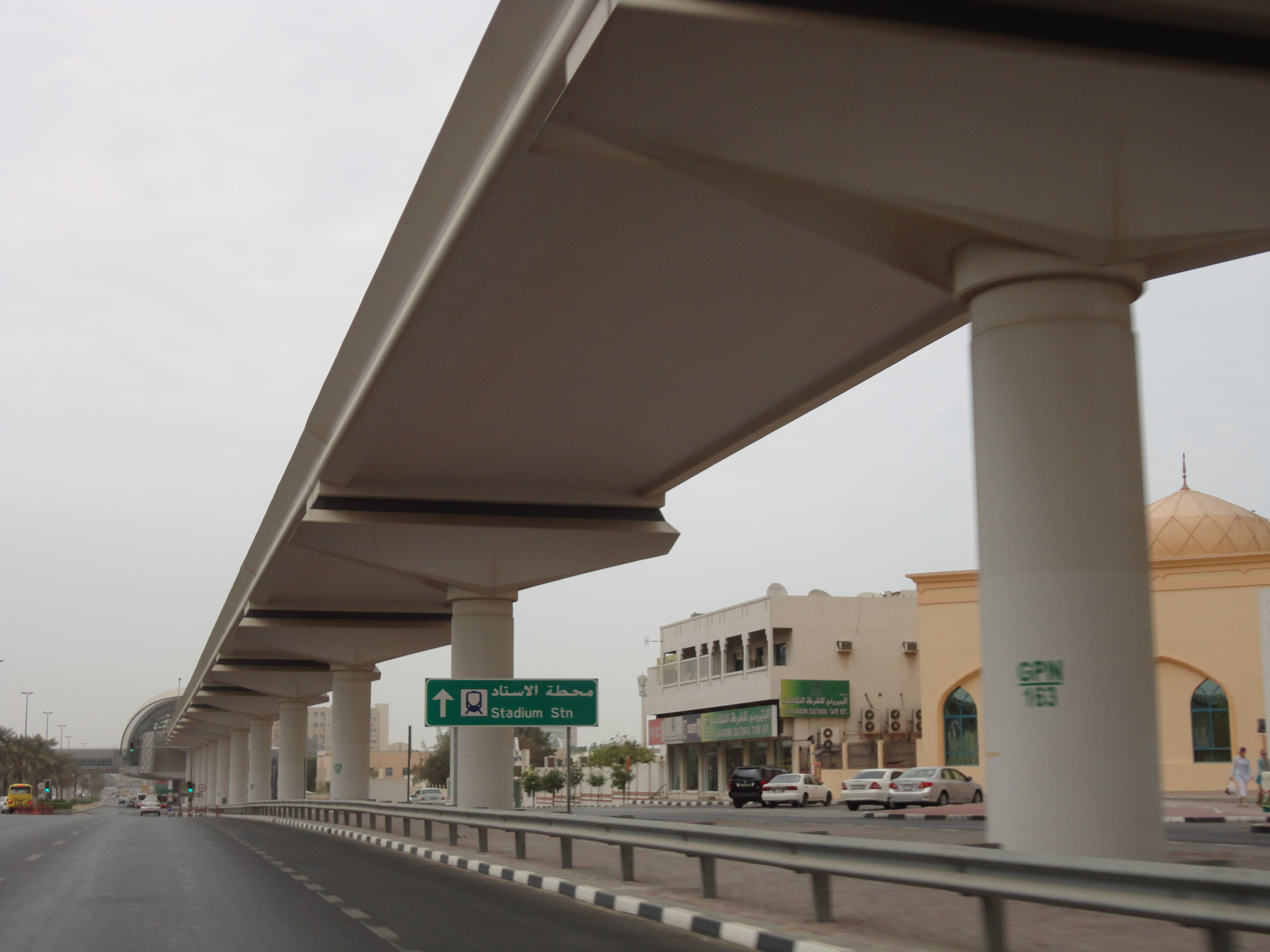
- Approach to the station from the southwest on the D93 road

General information
- Location: Al Nahda Street; Al Qusais First, Dubai; United Arab Emirates
- Coordinates: 25.27785°N 55.361633°E
- System: Metro Station
- Operator: Dubai Metro
- Line: Green Line
- Platforms: 2
- Tracks: 2
- Connections: RTA Dubai: 17 Al Sabkha Stn. - Muhaisnah 4, Wasl Oasis; W20 Stadium MS - Al Mamzar Beach (weekend only); 22 Al Nahda - Deira C.C Stn. / Dubai Courts; 64 Gold Souq Stn. - Ras Al Khor; F21 Al Nahda MS - Al Nahda 2; F22 Stadium MS - Qusais Ind'l Area 2; F24 Stadium MS - Qusais Ind'l Area 3; C18 Oud Metha Stn. - Sheikh Rashid Colony; E308 Stadium Bus Stn. - Al Jubail Stn. (Sharjah)

Other information
- Station code: 15
- Fare zone: 5

History
- Opened: September 9, 2011

Services
Preceding station	Dubai Metro	Following station
Al Qiyadah towards Creek	Green Line	Al Nahda towards e&
Location

Stadium (Arabic: الاستاد) is a rapid transit station on the Green Line of the Dubai Metro in the Deira area of Dubai, UAE.

The station opened as part of the Green Line on 9 September 2011. It is close to the Rashid Stadium (hence the name), Al Mulla Plaza, Amity School, and Dubai Municipality Quarters. The station is also close to a number of bus routes.

== Station Layout ==
G	Street level	Exit/Entrance
L1	Concourse	Automatic Fare Collection gates, station agent, crossover
L2	Side platform | Doors will open on the right
L2	Platform 2 Westbound	Towards ← Creek; Next Station: Al Qiyadah
L2	Platform 1 Eastbound	Towards → E& Next Station: Al Nahda
L2	Side platform | Doors will open on the right
