= Waterfront Market =

Fish, vegetable, and meat market in Dubai

Waterfront Market, Dubai سوق الواجهة البحرية
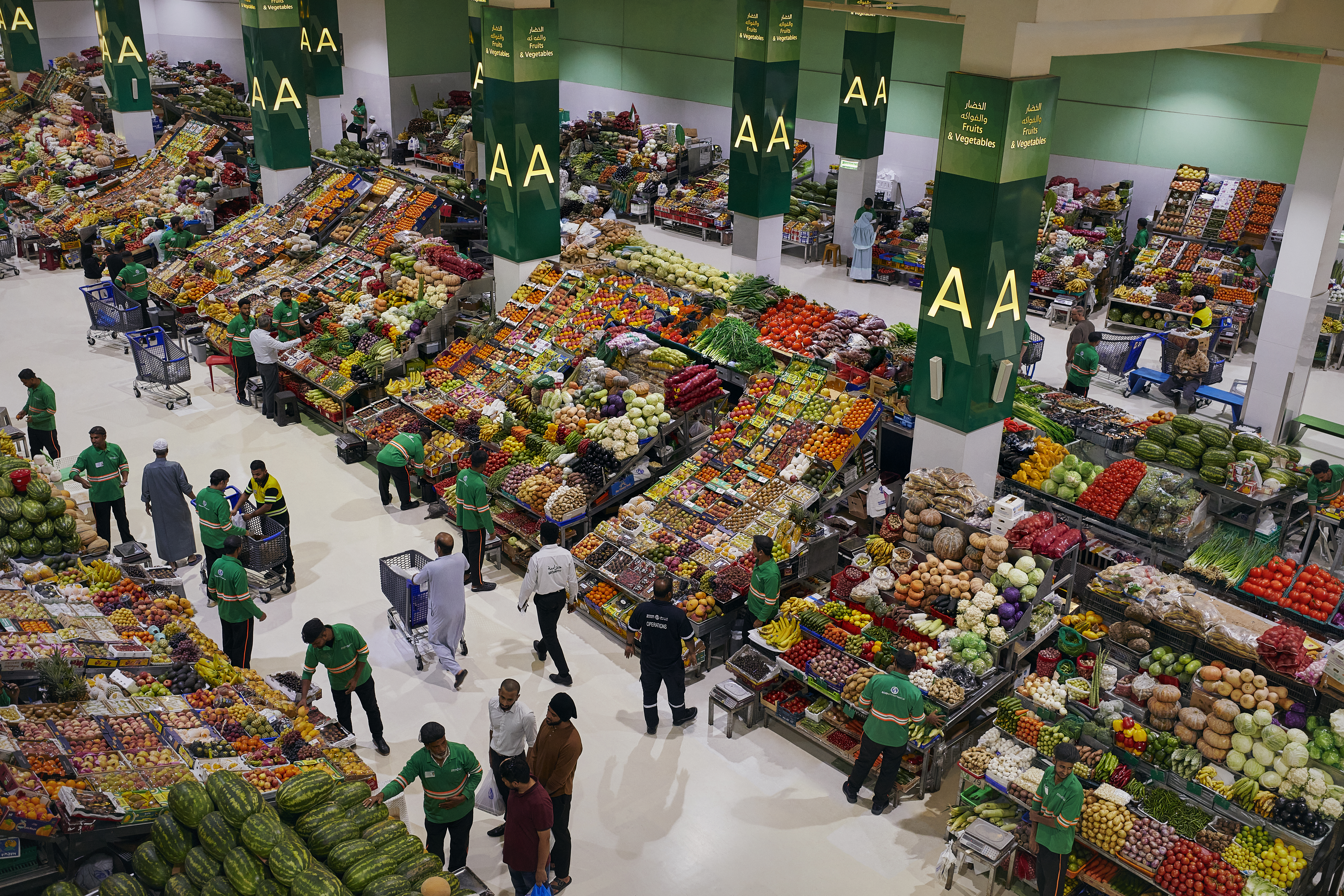
- Waterfront Market, Deira, Dubai.
- Location: Al Khaleej Road/Abu Hail Road junction, Deira, Dubai, UAE; Deira Corniche, Deira, Dubai, United Arab Emirates; 25.2860°N 55.3205°E
- Opening date: 2017
- Management: Ithra Dubai
- Owner: Ithra Dubai
- Goods sold: Fish, vegetables, meat, fruits, spices
- Days normally open: 24/7 daily
- Total retail floor area: 120,000 sq ft (11,000 m^{2})
- Parking: Available
- Website: waterfrontmarket.ae
- Interactive map of Waterfront Market, Dubai سوق الواجهة البحرية
- Vendors: 800+ traders Daily trade volume: 800+ tonnes of fresh food Markets: fish, meat, fruits and vegetables, bazaar, dry goods, restaurants, and auction hall Special features: "market-to-table" dining, waterfront restaurants, 24-hour fish market, live auction, dhow docking, and educational tours.

Waterfront Market (Arabic: سوق الواجهة البحرية) is a fish, meat, fruit, and vegetable market in Deira, Dubai, United Arab Emirates. The market, which has been functioning since 2017, is recognised as the largest food market in Dubai with over 800 traders trading over 800 tonnes of fresh food everyday. It is located on the Deira Corniche near Hamriya Port at the junction of Al Khaleej Road and Abu Hail Road. The market covers over 120,000 sq ft (11,000 m^{2}) and replaces the old Deira Fish Market. The market, developed in 2017 and operated by Ithra Dubai, is widely known as the region's most significant seafood and fresh produce market. The market serves as a significant contributor to Dubai's food economy, sustainability, and cultural tourism.

Goods include dates, fish, fruit, honey, meat, spices (e.g., baharat, dukkah, ras el hanout, saffron, and za'atar), and vegetables. There are restaurants on the waterfront at the market. The market supports sustainable fishing and farming. It is a major contributor to Dubai's food economy, sustainability goals, and cultural tourism, attracting millions of visitors and professional chefs each year. By 2022, the market had had 50 million visits since 2017.

== History ==
The Waterfront Market (Arabic: سوق الواجهة البحرية) in Deira, Dubai, is a modern embodiment of a long-standing tradition in seafood and food trade. While it opened in 2017, it carries forward and reinvents the legacy of the original Deira Fish Market (1958–2017). Deira lies on the Dubai Creek, a historic waterway that has been important for Dubai's growth as a trading hub. Over the centuries, dhow traffic, pearl-diving, fishing, and coastal trade were central to its economy. The Deira Fish Market, inaugurated in 1958, was for decades the central hub for sourcing fresh catch in Dubai and the Gulf. It was a social and economic gateway where fishermen, traders, and consumers converged. Fish was delivered directly out of boats, often early morning, and traders would display a wide variety of species, from local species like hammour and kingfish to more exotic catches, in a lively and noisy atmosphere. In 2017, the market moved to its current modern location as part of the "Waterfront Market" with its state-of-the-art urban facility with the charm of a traditional marketplace.

== Goods and services ==
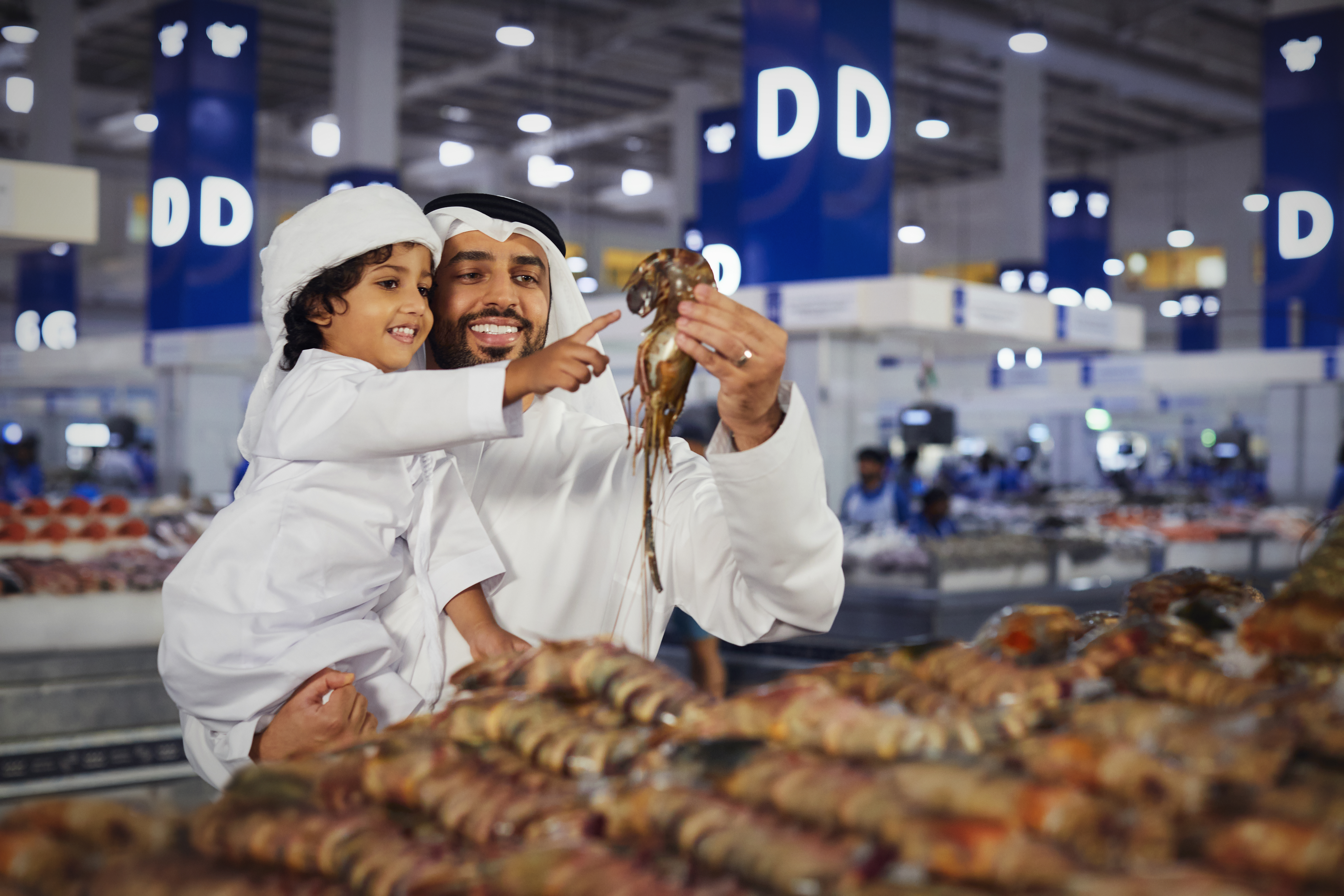
Prawns being displayed at the fish market section.

The market is renowned for its wide variety of fresh seafood such as kingfish, hammour, Omani Prawns, Jesh (Orange-spotted Trevally and Yellow Trevally), Faskar (two-bar seabream), Octopuses, Oysters, Lobsters and Shari (spangled emperor) trades over 600+ tonnes of seafood with over 500+ traders offering about 260+ varieties of fish. About 70% of the seafood sold in the market is sourced from the waters of the UAE, and the rest is imported globally. n addition to fresh fish, there is a section dedicated to dried fish, which is packaged in bags. As of 2022, the market is home to 435 stands offering raw meat (lamb, goat, cattle, camel, and chicken), 43 stalls of dried fish, and 18 stalls offering live fish and crustaceans, operating with strict safety and hygiene compliance. The market is known for premium cuts from multiple countries, making it a go-to market amongst the international community of Dubai. The Waterfront Market also offers some exotic and unique items such as quail eggs and ostrich eggs.

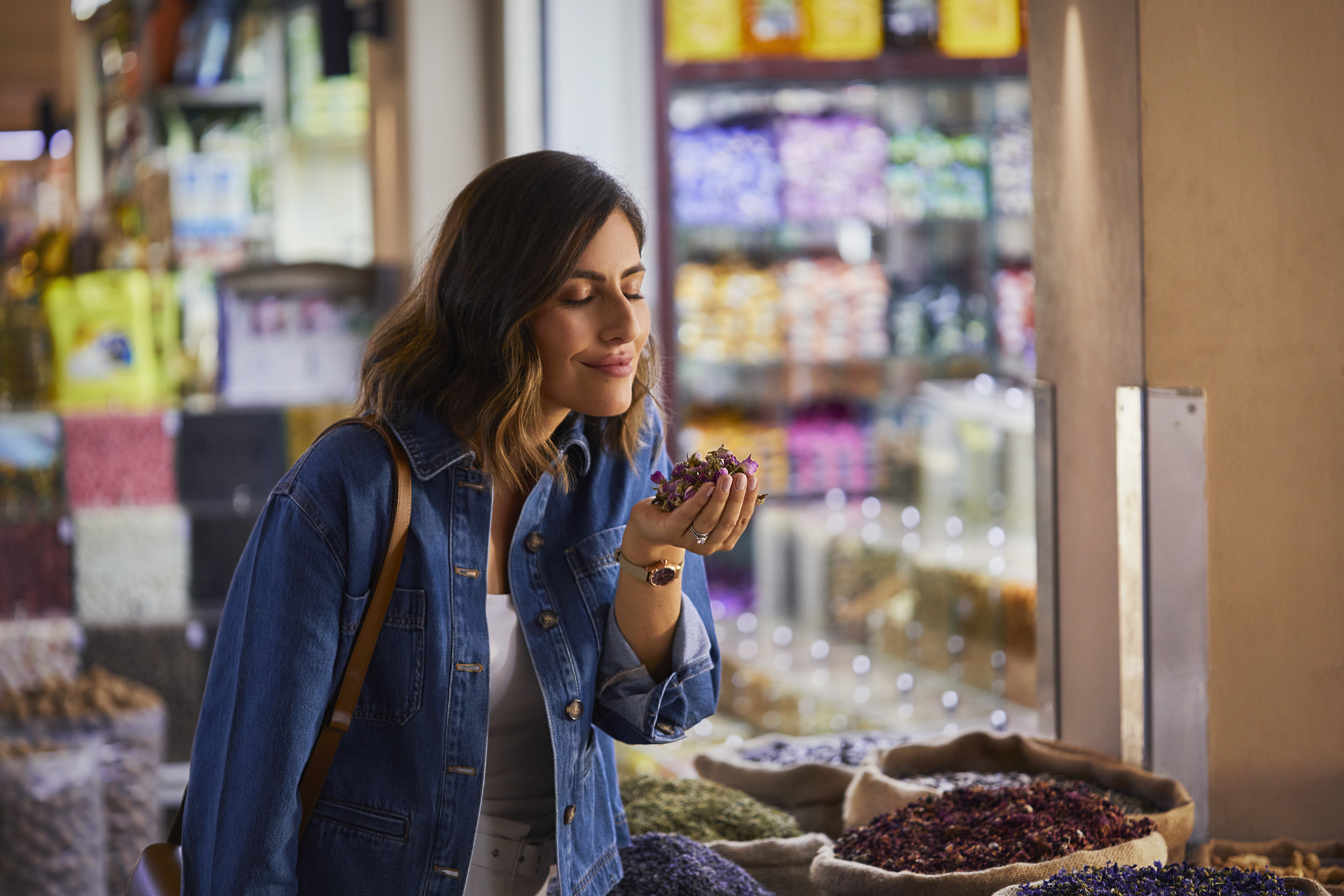
Spices section at the Waterfront Market, Deira.

Apart from meat and seafood items, the markets also offer a wide variety of fruits such as jujubes, figs, pineapples, etc., from and around the UAE. The market houses fresh fruits and vegetables from over 80 local farms, providing a boost to the local agrarian sector. Further. it offers over 160 varieties of produce procured from all over the world through its mammoth strength of over 300 traders. The market also offers Middle Eastern spices such as saffron, dukka (duqqa), ras el hanout, and baharat. Recently, the market has been reported to have added a dedicated cheese and dairy area and specialty coffee roasteries. A wide collection of honey and dates is another attraction of the market. In recent years, the market has garnered the attention of mango lovers due to its wide collection of mangoes at competitive prices during the peak summer months.

== Operations ==
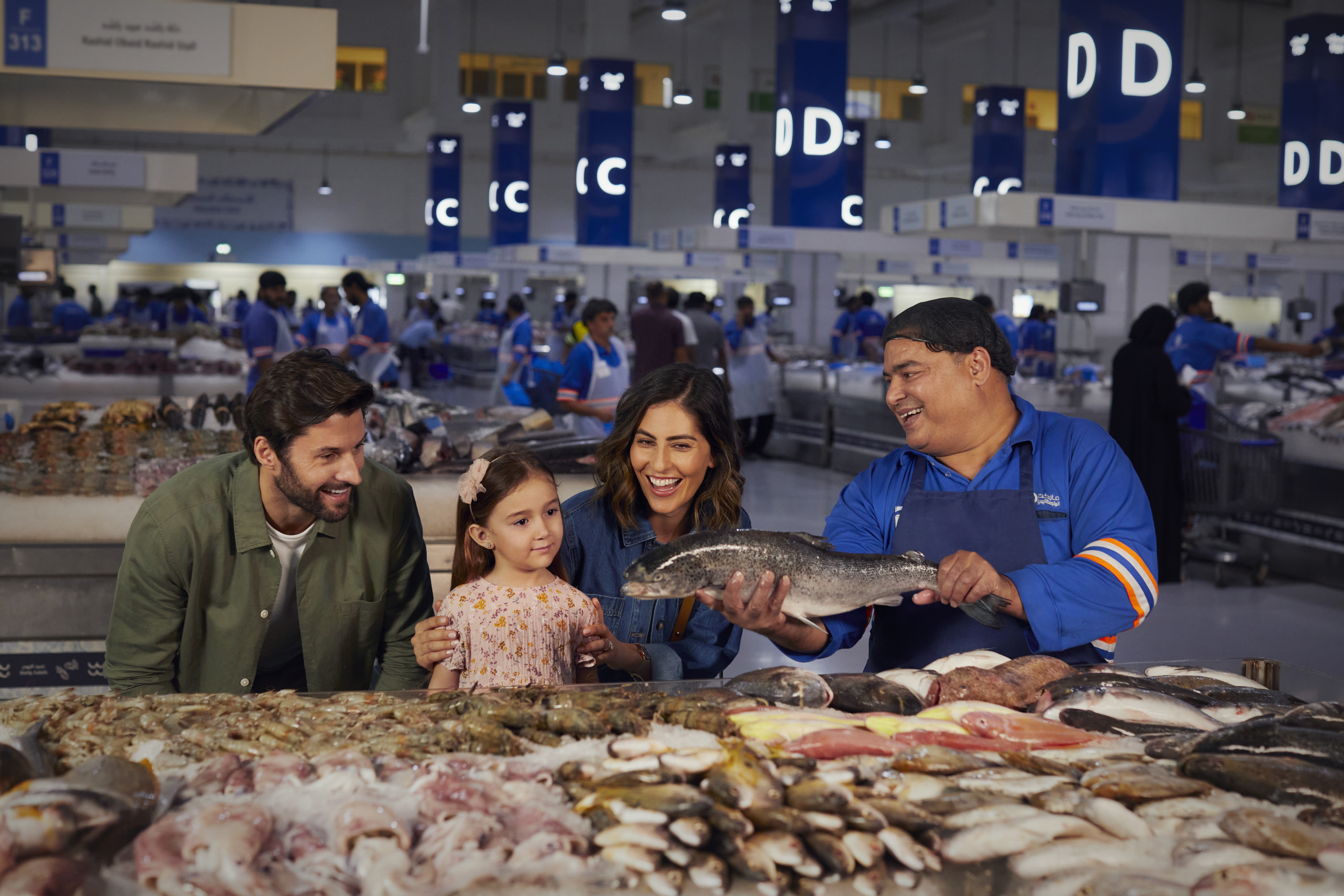
Fish market section.

The market holds the distinction of being the largest fish market in the Gulf Cooperation Council (GCC) with around 400 traders selling their catches every day. The market is open for 24 hours a day, with local fishermen unloading their catches at a dedicated facility within the market, and a live fish auction takes place between 11 pm and 6 am. As an attempt to promote the participation of small businesses and independent fishermen, small boats have been granted free entry to sell fish around the clock. The market was in the news for opening a dedicated dock for docking traditional fishing boats known as dhows. The fish, meat, spices etc. are available around the clock with temporary shutdowns for cleaning purposes. Additional sections include a dairy and cheese zone, bakeries, coffee roasteries, and a growing number of specialty seafood dining concepts.

== Culinary experiences ==
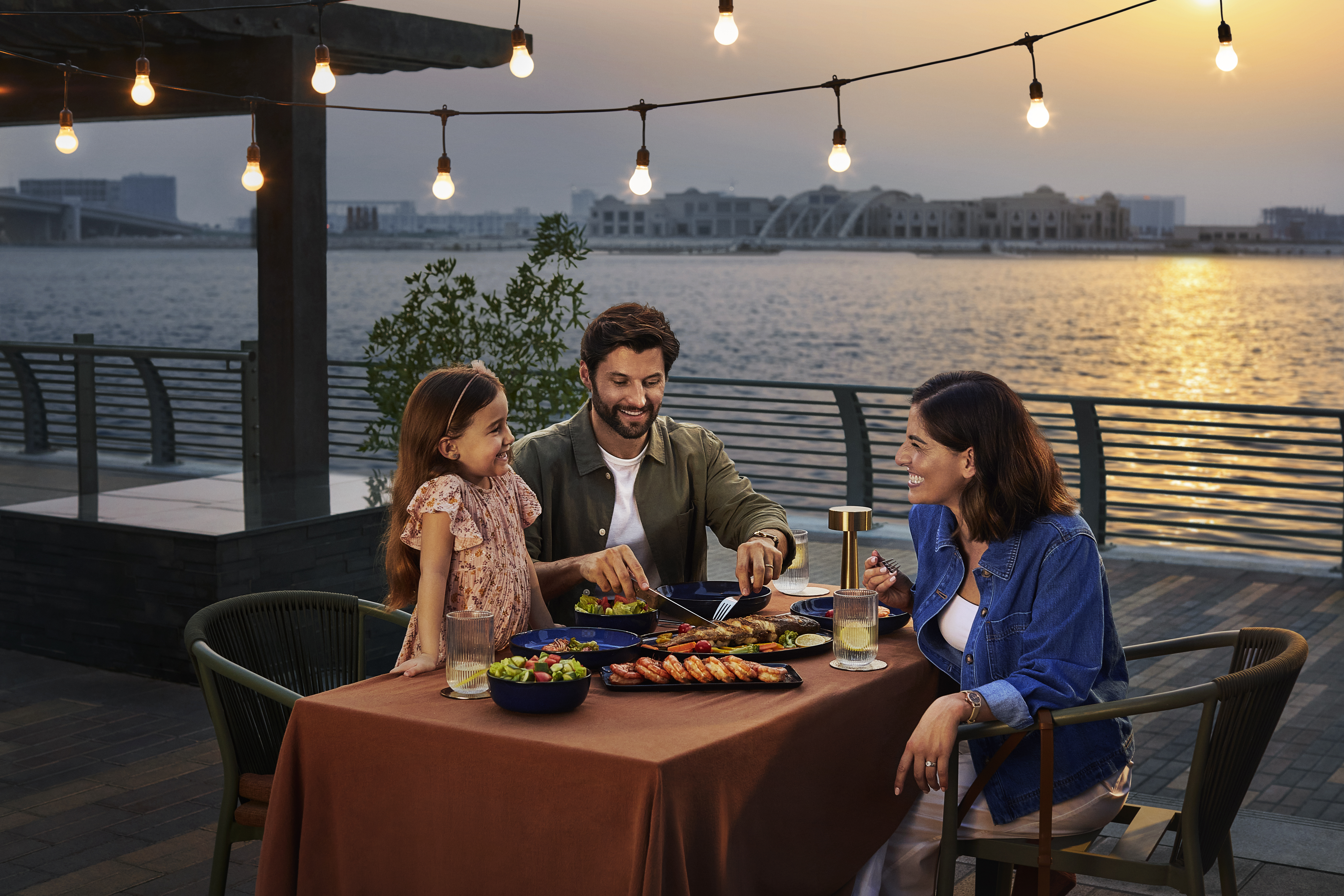
Dining area at the Waterfront Market.

Waterfront Market is the UAE's largest fresh food hub and a vital part of Dubai's culinary landscape. One of the key attractions at this facility is the option for customers to grill fish on their own at dedicated grilling stations or from the restaurants within the facility. After purchase, the customers can take the fish to the dedicated cleaner stations within the facility, where skilled workers will clean, gut, and fillet the fish per the customer's requirements. Later, the customer may opt for grilling, frying, or steaming the food at dedicated on-site cooking areas. The market also houses a number of restaurants and cafes for dine-out facilities, with some facilities offering to cook fish that are brought by the customers from the fish market.

A number of celebrity chefs have been known to visit the Waterfront Market as part of various promotions, sourcing raw materials for their restaurants, etc. In recent times, star chefs like Gordon Ramsay, Nobu Matsuhisa, Boy Logro, Chef Giovanni Ledon etc. In 2018, the Filipino celebrity chef Boy Logro announced an attempt to set a world record by involving up to 27,000 participants in a boodle fight in the Waterfront Market as part of the UAE National Day. A number of celebrity chefs including Kelvin Cheung, Roberto Segura, Hadrien Villidieu, chef Sperxos, J. P. Anglo, chef Giovanni Siracusa, Noul Catis, Giuseppe, Robin, Reif, Othman, etc. collaborated with FACT Dubai in their episodes showcasing the "behind the scenes" of his culinary work featuring he Waterfront Market.

The market is also a supply house of meat, fish, spices, vegetables, and fruits for the major hospitality and beverage industry, including major airlines such as Emirates Airlines. The market is located close to the historic quarters of Deira, including the Dubai Gold Souk, Spice Souk, and Heritage Village. The Waterfront Market, therefore, contributes significantly to the revitalisation of the Old Dubai as a dynamic district that blends tradition with modern urban renewal, serving over 108 nationalities, establishing Dubai's role as a global community hub. Daily live auctions attract traders nationwide, making it one of the busiest seafood hubs in the region.

== Community and events ==
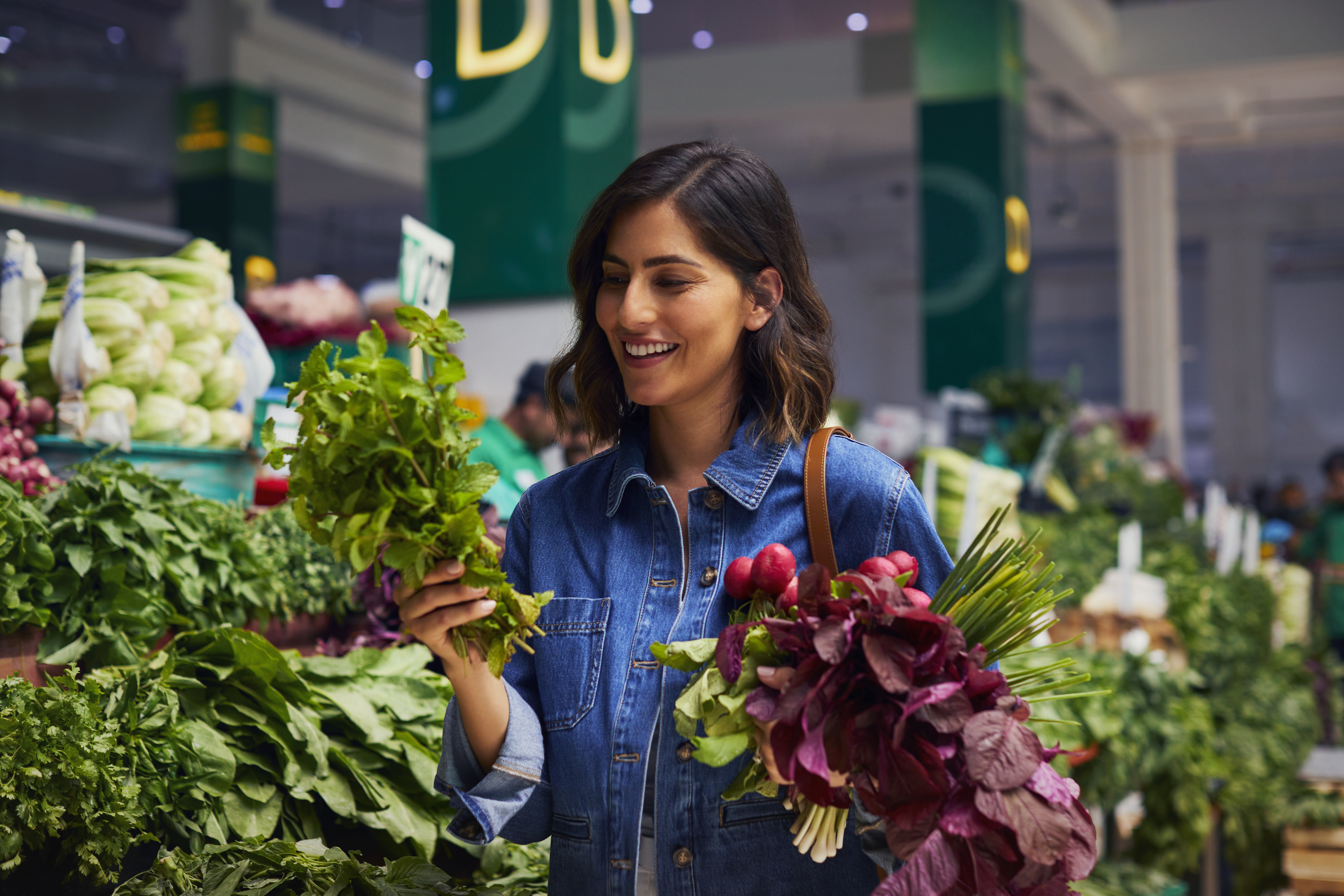
Vegetable market section.

The market acts as a central hub for fishermen, traders, suppliers, and customers by providing fresh food materials with quality and safety standards. The place also offers a food exploration opportunity for tourists to experience the food culture of Dubai. The market is a significant step towards the UAE's National Food Security Strategy 2051. The air-conditioned market proved to be a success in Dubai's heat for both the consumers and the traders. The market is accessible via the Dubai Metro (Green Line stations Abu Baker Al Siddique and Abu Hail) and specific bus routes.

The markets have been hosting various cultural events from time to time establishing itself as one of Dubai's newest lifestyle destinations, which earned the market the Trip Advisor Choice Award for 2026. Previously, the Murals and Art Competition. The market is also known for hosting special events during Diwali. The Waterfront Market celebrated the 54th National Day of UAE by unveiling a large-scale portrait of the nation's leaders crafter from over 400,000 coffee beans by artist Catherine Nunez. The market also hosted weeklong cultural events including daily Ayala dance, traditional Majilis offering complimentary Arabic coffee and dates, and the "Little Foodie Explorers Passport" activity for families. The "Little Foodie Explorers Passport" event allowed children to collect stamps across the Market, meet traders and discover new ingredients. Completed passports can be submitted for a certificate and small surprises, making it an enjoyable and educational activity for the long weekend.

From December 2025 to January 2026, the Waterfront Market is, hosted a month long Seafood Festival, celebrating the season's specialties. As part of this event, the market offered a variety of activities, including exclusive offers at all Waterfront Market restaurants and weekend entertainment such as live roaming music, bubble shows, and face painting. Furthermore, the market unveiled a Seafood-Themed Tree to complement the season. Shoppers can also access complimentary goods based on their purchases throughout the duration of the festival.

The rapid development of the Waterfront Market is also reported to be a chief contributor towards Dubai's real estate capital appreciation and high rental yields, making them attractive for global and regional investors alike. This has led to a number of premium real estate developments around the Waterfront Market area.

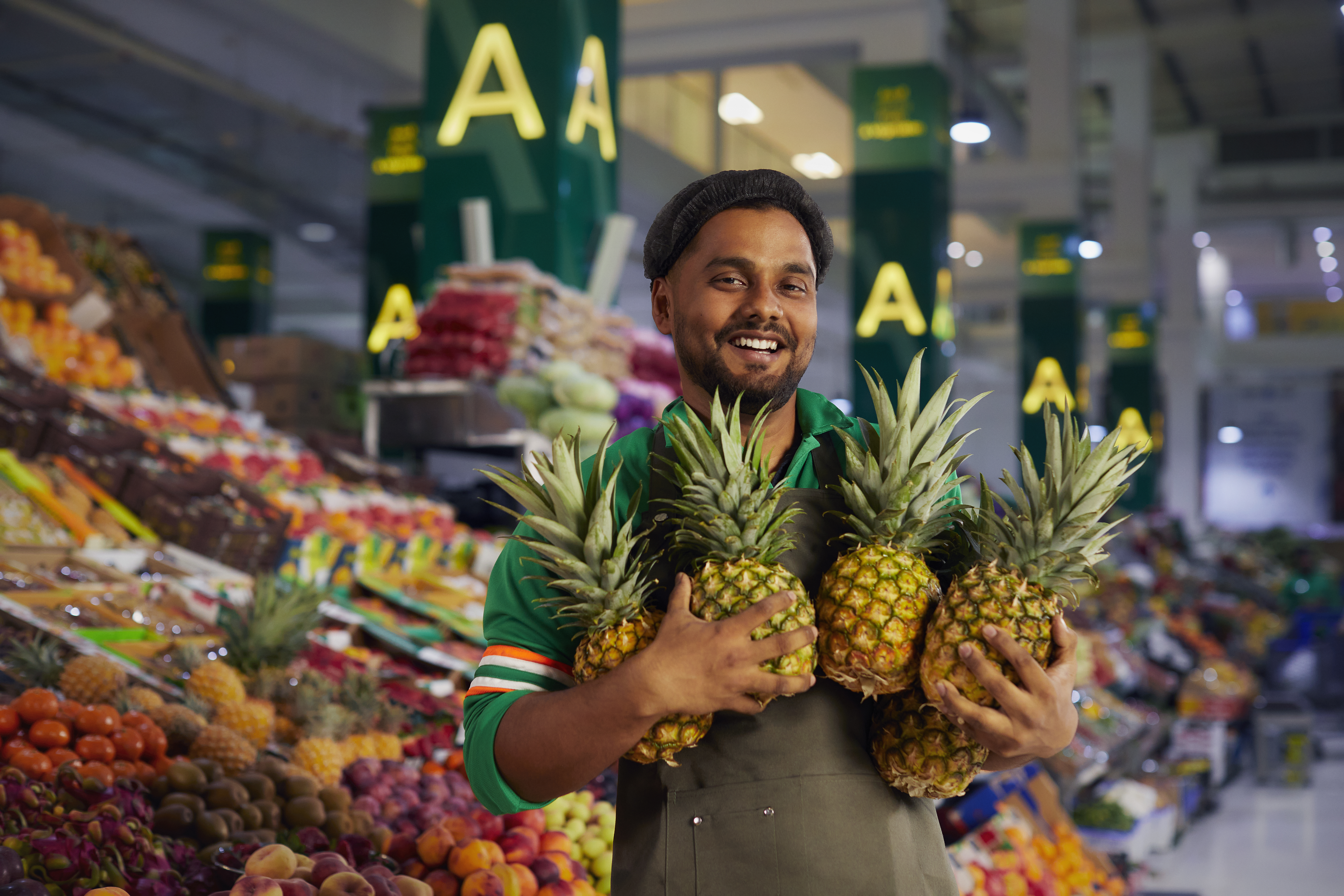
Fruits market section.

== Ownership and management ==
The entire facility of Waterfront Market is owned and operated by Ithra Dubai, a real estate development and asset management company wholly owned by the Investment Corporation of Dubai (ICD). Bhatia General Contracting (BGCC), a firm that helped shape Dubai's early growth since 1970s, delivered the Dubai Waterfront Market, one of its landmark civic infrastructure projects. Since its inception in 2016, Ithra Dubai has been tasked with the management of large-scale and mixed-use projects across Dubai. Some of its key projects include the Waterfront Market, One Za'abeel, Dubai Gold District, Deira Enrichment Project, etc. with key focus upon developing sustainable, community-focused destinations by integrating commerce and lifestyle in line with Dubai's long-term urban vision.
