= Al Mamzar =

Al Mamzar الممزر
- Community
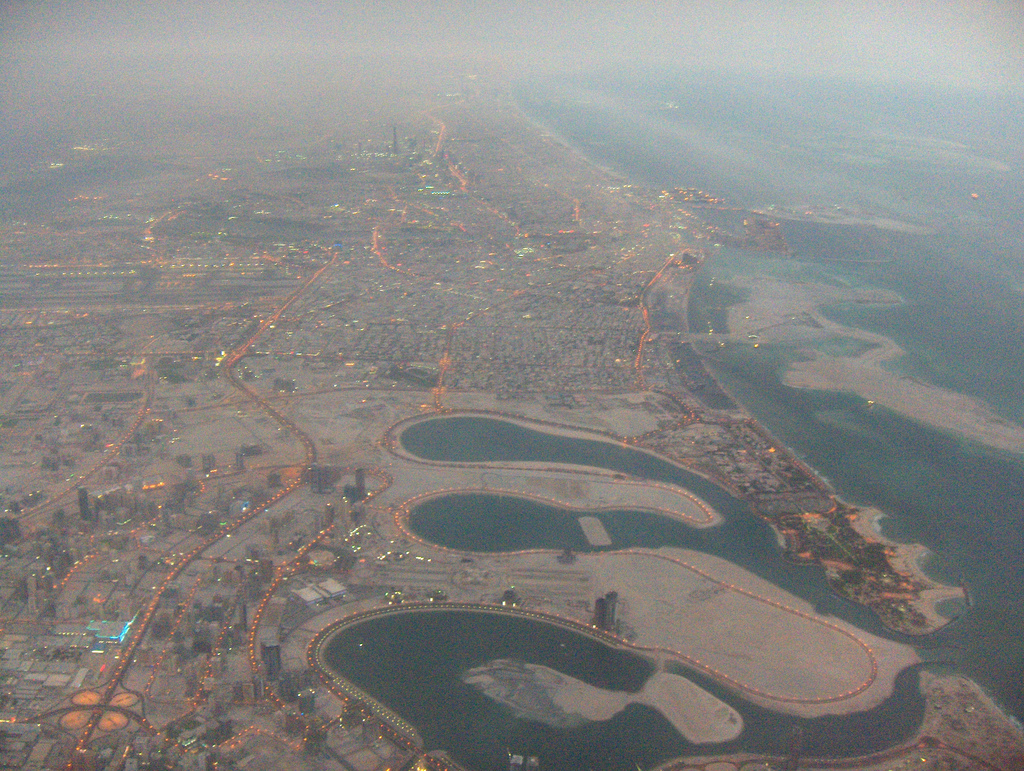
- Aerial view of Al Mamzar (center-right)
- Interactive map of Al Mamzar
- Coordinates: 25.30947°N 55.34281°E
- Country: United Arab Emirates
- Emirate: Dubai
- City: Dubai

Area
  - Total: 3.35 km^{2} (1.29 sq mi)

Population (2000)
  - Total: 2,260
  - Density: 675/km^{2} (1,750/sq mi)
- Community number: 134

Al Mamzar (Arabic: الممزر) is a locality in Dubai, United Arab Emirates (UAE). Al Mamzar is located in the area of Deira, in the north-east of Dubai. The locality is bordered by the Persian Gulf to the north, Al Waheda to the west, Hor Al Anz to the south and the emirate of Sharjah to the east.

The north-east section of the locality is residential. Al Ittihad School, Dubai Cultural and Scientific Association, Al Gaz Mosque, Dubai Police Headquarters and Al Mamzar Park are important landmarks in the locality.
