= Ayal Nasir =

عيال ناصر Eyal Nasser
- Community
- Interactive map of عيال ناصر
- Coordinates: 25.27388°N 55.30397°E
- Country: United Arab Emirates
- Emirate: Dubai
- City: Dubai

Area
  - Total: 0.17 km^{2} (0.066 sq mi)

Population (2000)
  - Total: 13,077
  - Density: 77,000/km^{2} (200,000/sq mi)

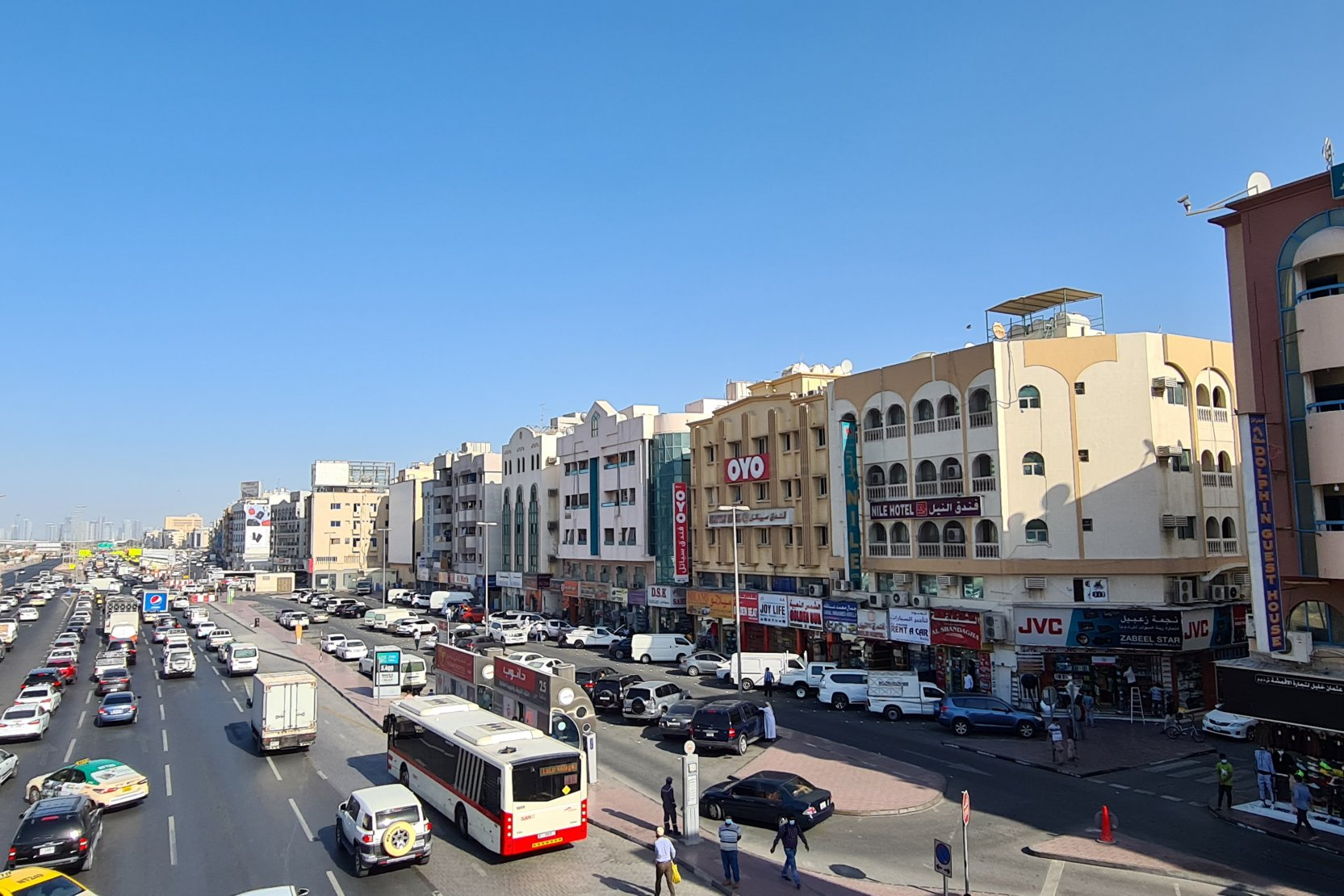
Community 116 Ayal Nasir, Dubai, UAE.

Eyal Nasser (Arabic: عيال ناصر) is a locality in Dubai, United Arab Emirates (UAE). Eyal Nasser is located in the heart of Deira in eastern Dubai. Eyal Nasser is bordered to the west by Al Dhagaya, the east by Al Murar, the south by Naif and to the north by the Deira Corniche.

The local road system in Eyal Nasser follows the grid plan. Even-numbered roads run east–west through the community (from 2nd Street to 20th Street), while odd-numbered roads run north–south (from 1C Street to 23rd Street). Like its neighbouring communities, Eyal Nasser is largely residential. Its location provides easy access to Dubai Creek and to Deira's central business district. Eyal Nasser has the highest population density of all communities in Dubai, and the second highest in the world.

== History ==
Eyal Nasser means the Sons of Nasser in Arabic. The name of the locality is based on the names of the sons of Nasser Al Suwaidi who lived in the area previously.
