= Al Baraha =

Al Baraha البراحة
- Community
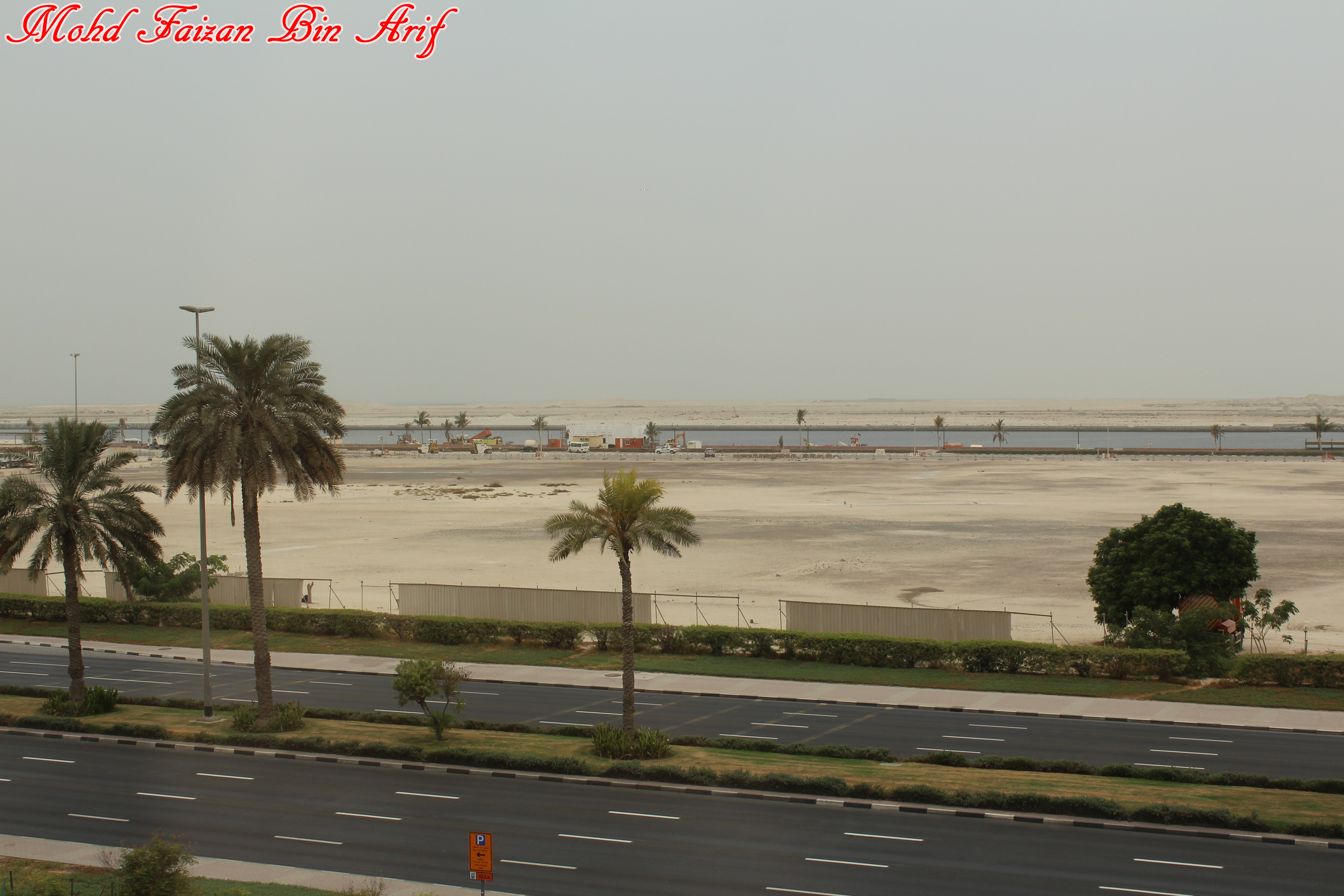
- Al Baraha - Dubai - United Arab Emirates
- Interactive map of Al Baraha
- Coordinates: 25.28292°N 55.31806°E
- Country: United Arab Emirates
- Emirate: Dubai
- City: Dubai

Area
  - Total: 1.104 km^{2} (0.426 sq mi)

Population (2000)
  - Total: 7,823
  - Density: 7,086/km^{2} (18,350/sq mi)
- Community number: 122

Al Baraha (Arabic: البراحة) is a locality in Dubai, United Arab Emirates (UAE). The community is residential and borders the Deira Corniche on the north and Al Muteena on the south. Routes D 92 (Al Khaleej Road) and D 82 (Al Rasheed Road) form the northern and southern peripheries of Al Baraha.

The residential section of Al Baraha consists of local lanes that are numbered even, if they run east–west, or odd, if they run north–south. Even-numbered streets run from 2nd Street through 24th Street, while odd-numbered streets run from 1st Street through 29th Street. The Deira Corniche lies to the northern periphery of Al Baraha and is a commercial and tourist centre. Additionally, Al Baraha Hospital, Dubai Hospital and Belhoul Speciality Hospital are located in Al Baraha.
