= Deira Corniche =

Waterfront promenade in Dubai, UAE

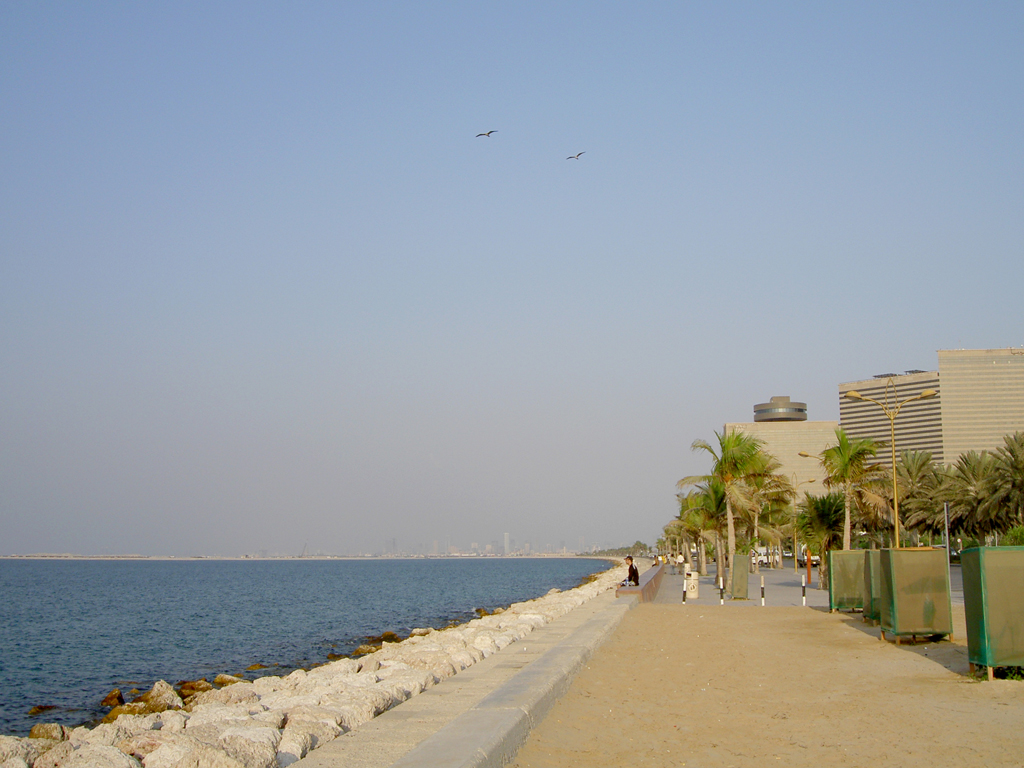
Deira Corniche, Dubai

The Deira Corniche (Arabic: كورنيش ديرة) is a waterfront promenade in Dubai, United Arab Emirates. The promenade, sometimes called the Dubai Corniche, lies in northeastern Dubai, in Deira. It is flanked to the north by the Persian Gulf and consists of a broad pedestrian walkway that extends to the Dubai Creek.

A contract for the construction of the road was signed on 23 September 1975, for a price of US$ 25 million by Hamdan bin Rashid Al Maktoum, the former deputy ruler of Dubai. A variety of traditional and modern retail and hospitality areas exist along the promenade. It borders the localities of Al Dhagaya, Ayil Nasir and Al Hamriya Port, all of which are part of the larger Deira central business district. The old Dubai Fish and Vegetable Market, as well as the Dubai Gold Souk and Dubai Spice Souk, are nearby. The Hyatt Regency Dubai lies on route D 90 (Al Khaleej Road), which runs parallel to the Deira Corniche.

A US$ 1.3 billion project was initiated in 2004 to restructure the area between the westend of the creek in Deira and Al Hamriya Port, which will involve new residential developments, hotels and the development of Palm Deira off the northeastern coast of Dubai.

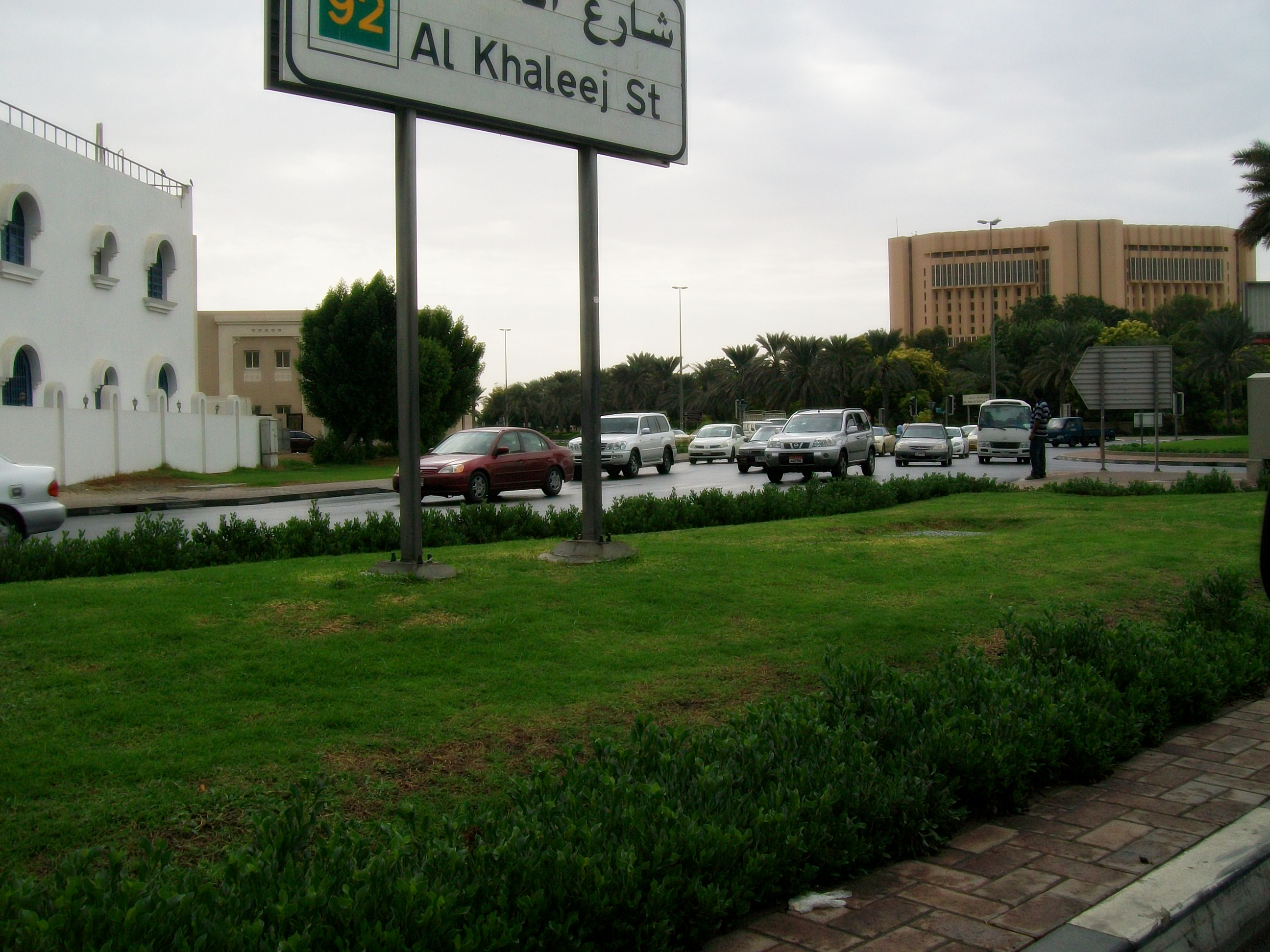
Deira Corniche. 2008

A similar promenade also exists on the Bur Dubai side of the Creek, extending from Al Ghubaiba to Al Seef Marine Station.

The Waterfront Market, selling fish, vegetables, and meat, opened on the Corniche in 2017.
