= Naif =

Naif نايف
- Community
- Interactive map of Naif
- Coordinates: 25.27124°N 55.30535°E
- Country: United Arab Emirates
- Emirate: Dubai
- City: Dubai

Area
  - Total: 0.561 km^{2} (0.217 sq mi)

Population (2022)
  - Total: 53,403
  - Density: 95,200/km^{2} (247,000/sq mi)
- Community number: 118

Naif (pronounced [naːˈiːf], Arabic: نايف) is a locality in Deira side of Dubai, United Arab Emirates. It is a commercial and residential locality. Considering the nearby localities, Naif is larger in size. It is one of the oldest localities. The residents of this locality are mainly South Asians. The coordinates of Naif are N 25.27153° and E 55.30512°.

Naif has the second-highest population density of all communities in Dubai (after Ayil Nasir).

== Fire in Naif Souq ==
In 2008, A fire broke out in the Naif Souq and around 183 shops were burned down. The Dubai Municipality built a new building which has almost double the capacity of the old building.
