= Al Twar =

Al Twar الطوار
- Community
- Interactive map of Al Twar
- Coordinates: 25.27155°N 55.36388°E
- Country: United Arab Emirates
- Emirate: Dubai
- City: Dubai

Area
  - Total: 6.8 km^{2} (2.6 sq mi)

Population (2017)
  - Total: 24,479
  - Density: 3,600/km^{2} (9,300/sq mi)
- Community number: 226, 227, 228, 233, 234

Al Twar (Arabic: الطوار) is a locality in Dubai, United Arab Emirates. Located in eastern Dubai in Deira. Al Twar borders Dubai International Airport to the south, Al Qusais to the north, Hor Al Anz to the west and Muhaisnah to the east. It is bounded to the north and south by routes D 93 (Al Nahda Road) and D 91 (Abu Hail Road) respectively.

Al Twar is predominantly a residential community. Landmarks in Al Twar include Dubai Police headquarters.

== Neighborhoods ==
Al Twar contains five sub-communities:

- Al Twar 1
- Al Twar 2
- Al Twar 3
- Al Twar 4
- Al Twar 5
