= E& (Dubai Metro) =

Metro station in Dubai, United Arab Emirates

e& اي اند

General information
- Location: Al Nahda Street; Al Qusais Third; Dubai, United Arab Emirates
- Coordinates: 25°15′17″N 55°24′5″E
- System: Metro station
- Operator: Dubai Metro
- Line: Green Line
- Connections: RTA Dubai: 31 Airport Terminal 2 - Oud Al Mateena; 34 Etisalat MS - Al Khawaneej 2; 36A / 36B Etisalat MS - Silicon High Bay (and vice versa); F02 Etisalat MS - Muhaisnah 4; F07 Etisalat MS - Al Qusais DM Housing; E315 Etisalat MS - Al Muwailah Bus Stn. (Sharjah); E411 Etisalat MS - Ajman

Other information
- Station code: 11
- Fare zone: 5

History
- Opened: 10 September 2011

Services
Preceding station	Dubai Metro	Following station
Al Qusais towards Creek	Green Line	Terminus
Location

e& (Arabic: اي اند, formerly Etisalat and Etisalat by e&) is a rapid transit station and the eastern terminus on the Green Line of the Dubai Metro in Dubai, UAE.

The station is located on Al Nahda Street, between Al Qusais and Al Twar, and north of Dubai International Airport. It is close to Al Qusais Pond Park. It is also close to the junction of Al Nahda Street with the major Sheikh Mohammed Bin Zayed Road (E 311). The station is close to the Red Line's Centrepoint station and Rashidiya Depot. The Green Line starts from this terminal and ends at Creek. It has a parking facility which can accommodate over 2,300 vehicles and a popular park-and-ride location for commuters.

== History ==
Trial running began in October 2010, with the station inaugurated on 9 September 2011 and opened to the public the next day, 10 September 2011.

On February 5, 2023, this station was renamed to "Etisalat by e&", as a response to company rebranding. September 13, 2024, after another rebrand, the station got renamed E&.

== Platform layout ==
G	Street Level	Exit/ Entrance
L1	Mezzanine	Fare control, station agent, Metro Card vending machines, crossover
L2	Side platform | Doors will open on the right
L2	Platform 1 Eastbound	Towards ← Train Terminates Here
L2	Platform 2 Westbound	Towards → Creek; Next Station: Al Qusais
L2	Island platform | P2 Doors will open on the right | P3 Doors will open on the left
L2	Platform 3 Westbound	Towards → Creek; Next Station: Al Qusais
