= Hor Al Anz =

Hor Al Anz هور العنز
- Community
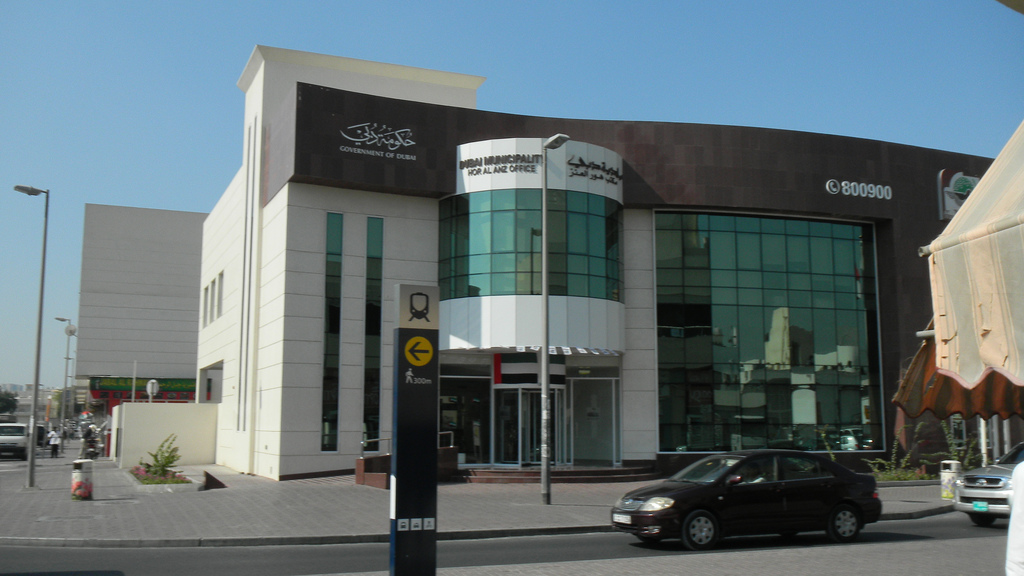
- Dubai Municipality Hor Al Anz Office
- Interactive map of Hor Al Anz
- Coordinates: 25.27668°N 55.33556°E
- Country: United Arab Emirates
- Emirate: Dubai
- City: Dubai
- Boroughs: List: Hor Al Anz; Hor Al Anz East

Area
  - Total: 4.18 km^{2} (1.61 sq mi)

Population (2000)
  - Total: 40,343
  - Density: 9,650/km^{2} (25,000/sq mi)

Hor Al Anz (Arabic: هور العنز) is a locality in Dubai, United Arab Emirates. The locality is in Deira, East Dubai. Hor Al Anz is bounded by routes D 82 (Abu Baker Al Siddique Road), E 11 (Al Ittihad Road), D 82 (Al Rasheed Road) and Baghdad Street (D 95) and is subdivided into Hor Al Anz and Hor Al Anz East.

== History ==
Hor Al Anz is named after Al Anz (Arabic: العنز), a horse that belonged to Sheikh Saeed bin Maktoum the former ruler of Dubai. Hor (Arabic: هور) means a collapsed sand dune in Arabic. Al Anz buckled, died, and was buried in a sand dune in the area and the name was given to the area due to the incident.

As of 2000, the area has a population of 40,302.
