= Al Ras (Dubai Metro) =

Rapid transit station in Dubai

Al Ras الراس

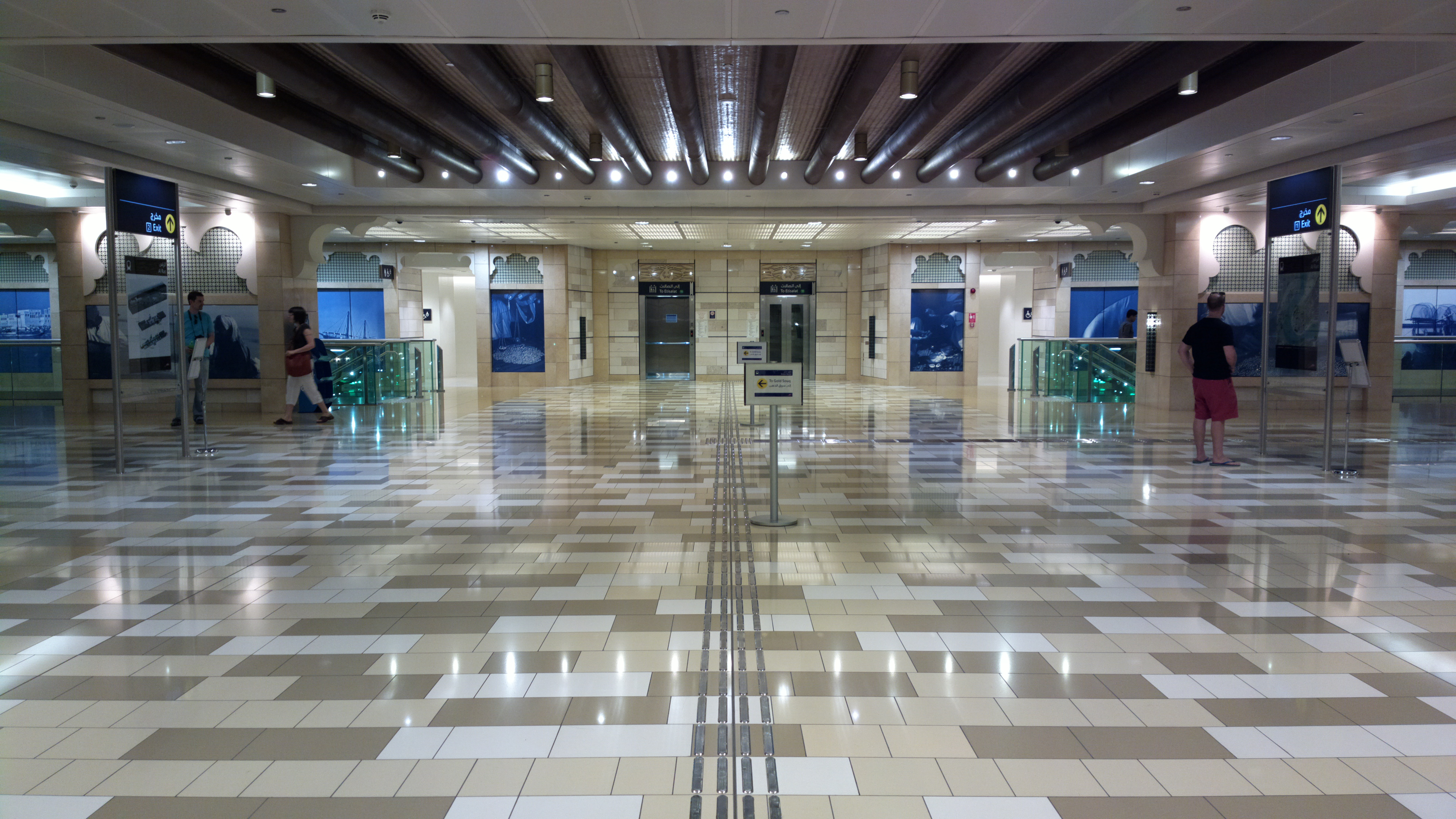
- Internal view

General information
- Location: Al Khor Street; Al Ras, Deira; Dubai, United Arab Emirates
- Coordinates: 25°16′08″N 55°17′38″E
- System: Metro Station
- Line: Green Line
- Platforms: 2 side platforms
- Tracks: 2
- Connections: RTA Dubai: 5 Union MS - Abu Hail MS; C9 Satwa Stn. - Al Qiyadah MS; C28 Al Baraha Stn. - Mamzar, Beach Park; E16 Sabkha Stn. - Hatta Stn.

Construction
- Structure type: Underground
- Accessible: yes

Other information
- Station code: 23
- Fare zone: 5

History
- Opened: September 9, 2011

Services
Preceding station	Dubai Metro	Following station
Al Ghubaiba towards Creek	Green Line	Gold Souq towards e&
Location

Al Ras (Arabic: الراس, Arabic pronunciation: [aˈrːaːs]) is a rapid transit station on the Green Line of the Dubai Metro in Dubai, UAE.

== History ==
Al Ras metro station opened as part of the first portion of the Green Line on 9 September 2011, with trains running from Etisalat to Dubai Healthcare City.

== Location ==
Al Ras station is located in the eponymous Al Ras community in Deira near the entrance to Dubai Creek, in the historic centre of Dubai. Among the major points of interest near the station are the Gold Souk, the Spice Souk, Al Ras Public Library, and the Sheikh Saeed Al Maktoum House.

== Station layout ==
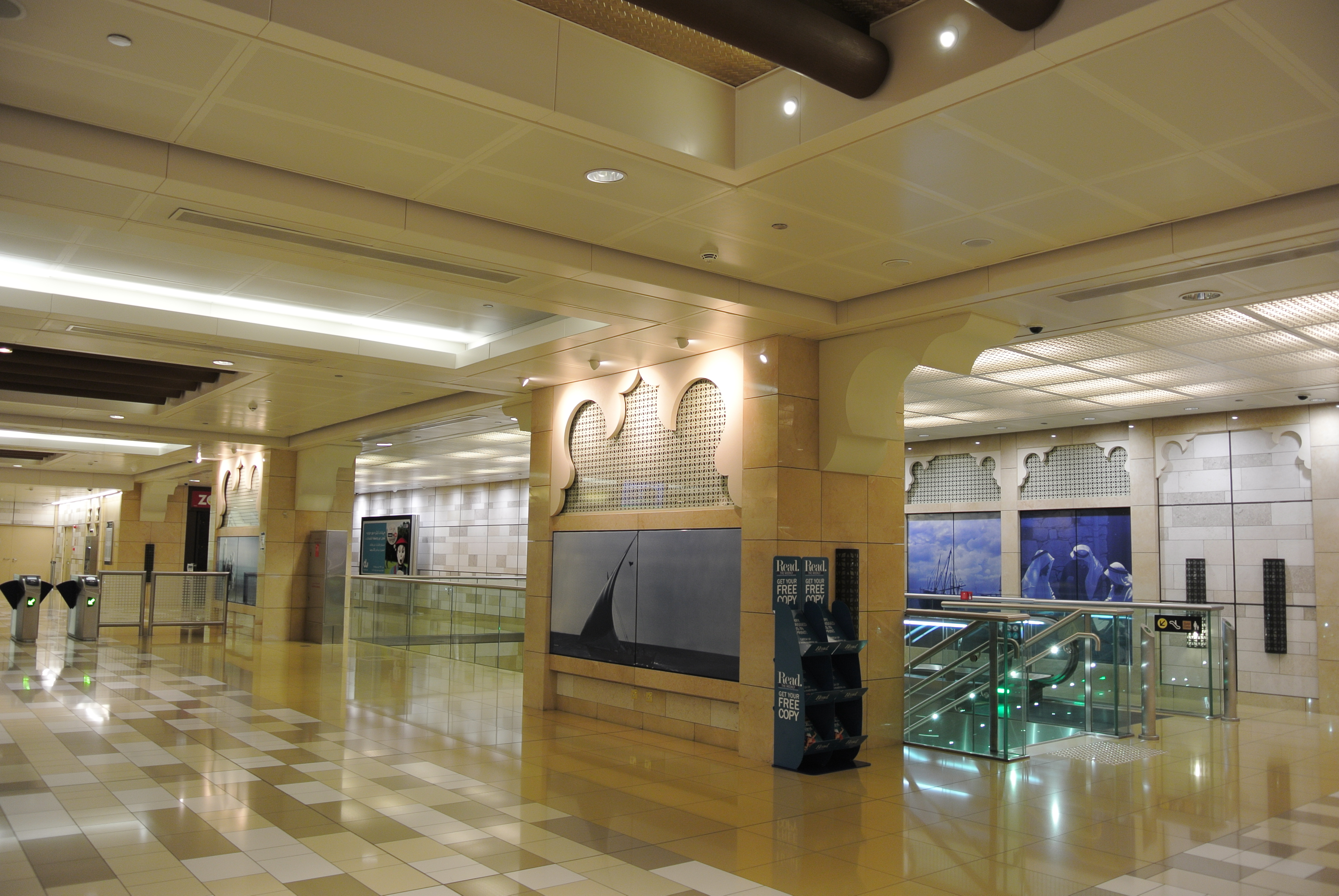
Middle Eastern architecture in the Al Ras station

Like most Dubai Metro stations in the city's historic centre, Al Ras lies underground, specifically below Baniyas Road and 103rd Street. Al Ras has two side platforms with two tracks, with tracks curving from underneath Dubai Creek northeasterly towards Palm Deira. Along with its sister station across Dubai Creek to the west, Al Ghubaiba, Al Ras has different theming than most Metro stations. Instead of using the elements of air, water, fire or earth, its design is inspired by traditional Middle Eastern architecture to mirror the surrounding architecture.

G	Street level	Exit/Entrance
L1	Concourse	Automatic Fare Collection gates, station agent, crossover
L2	Side platform | Doors will open on the right
L2	Platform 2 Westbound	Towards ← Creek; Next Station: Al Ghubaiba
L2	Platform 1 Eastbound	Towards → E& Next Station: Gold Souq
L2	Side platform | Doors will open on the right
