= Dubai Public Libraries =

Library system in Dubai, United Arab Emirates

Dubai Public Libraries (مكتبات دبي العامة) is a library system of the Dubai Municipality serving Dubai, United Arab Emirates (UAE).

The system, the oldest in the UAE, began in 1963 when Al Ras Public Library was built in the Al Ras area of Deira, central Dubai. In 1989, four branches opened in Hor Al Anz, Al Rashidiya, Al Safa, and Umm Suqeim. Hatta Library opened in 1998 and Al Twar Public Library opened in the summer of 2007. The Al Twar library cost more than DH 10 million.

== Libraries in Dubai ==
The following are library branches in Deira:

- Al Ras Library, Baniyas Road
- Hor Al Anz Library, Al Wuheida Road
- Rashidiya Library, Al Rashidiya
- Al Twar Library, Al Twar
- Al Safa Arts & Design Library
- Umm Suqeim Library
- Hatta Library
- Al Mankhool Library

== See also ==
- Mohammed Bin Rashid Library
