= Nazwah =

Nazwah نزوه
- Community
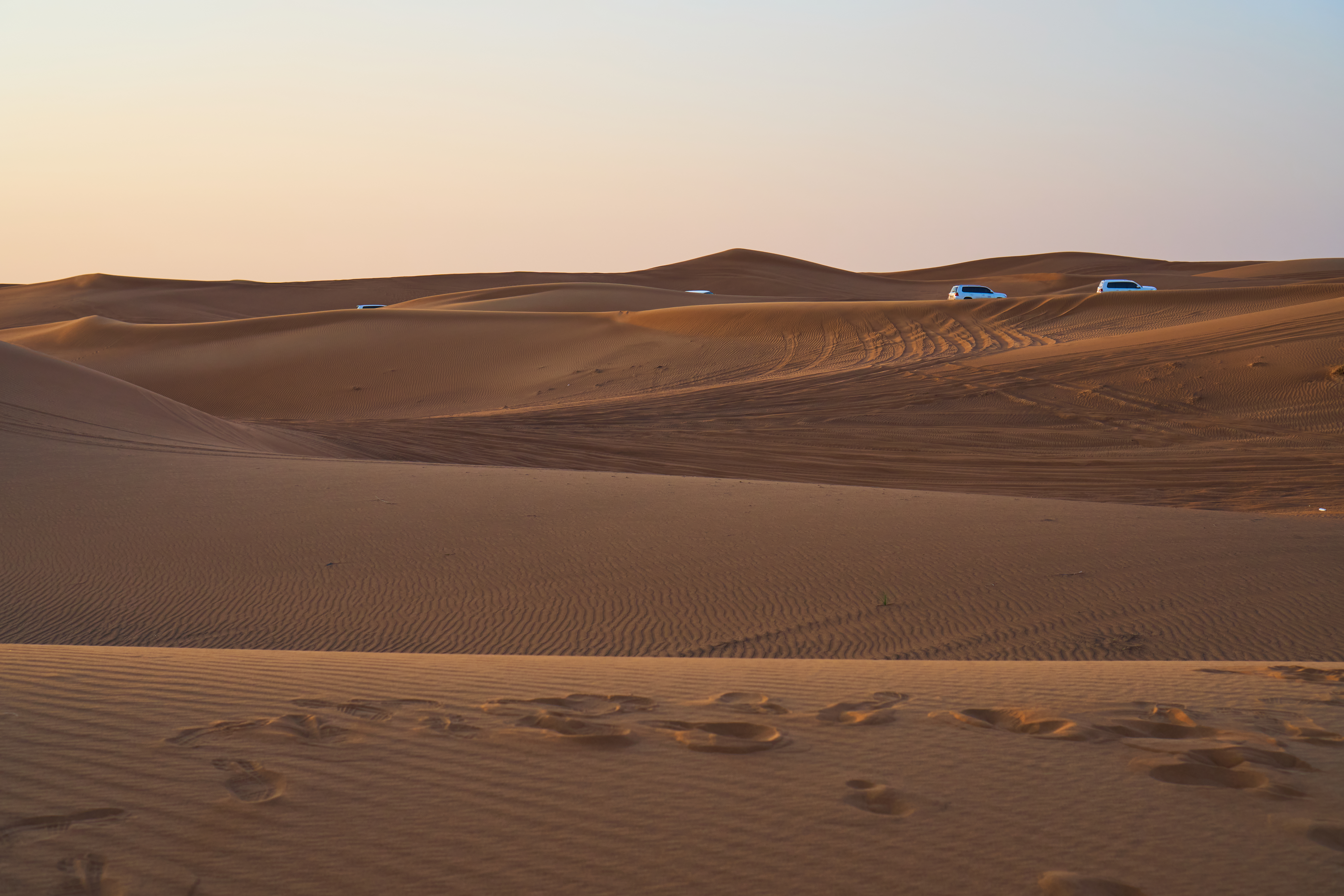
- Desert in Nazwah
- Interactive map of Nazwah
- Coordinates: 25.024064°N 55.646551°E
- Country: United Arab Emirates
- Emirate: Dubai
- City: Dubai

Area
  - Total: 13.1 km^{2} (5.1 sq mi)

Population
  - Total: 575
  - Density: 43.9/km^{2} (114/sq mi)
- Community number: 736

Nazwah (Arabic: نزوه) is a community of the Emirate of Dubai, in the United Arab Emirates. Administratively it is part of the Sector 7, and is located in eastern Dubai bordering the Emirate of Sharjah.

== Territory ==
The territory of the community occupies an area of 13.1 km^{2} which develops in a non-urban area in the central area -eastern Dubai, bordering the Emirate of Sharjah.

The area is bordered to the southwest by Dubai-Hatta Road (E 44), to the east by Nazwa Road (S 149) which separates it from the municipality of Al Madam of Sharjah, to the north by the communities of Lehbab and Al Meryal.

The territory is almost completely desert and falls entirely within the Arabian Desert and Saharo-Arabian xerophilous maquis ecoregion.

The region is sparsely inhabited and there are no significant residential settlements. The only housing agglomeration is located at the southern tip of the territory at the intersection of Dubai-Hatta Road and Mahafiz Nazwa Street immediately close to the border with the Al Madam municipality of Sharjah. The Nazwa Mosque is also located in this area.

In the community there are farms for the production of fruit and vegetables and for the production of eggs and poultry farming.

Just south of the community is the Jabal Nazwa Conservation Reserve, one of eight protected areas in the Emirate of Dubai.

The area is not currently served by the Dubai Metro, but the E 16 surface line, which connects Al Sabkha with Hatta, runs along the Dubai-Hatta Road and makes stops in Nazwa.

== Bibliography ==
- Dubai: The Complete Residents' Guide. Explorer Publishing & Distribution, 2006. June 2006. ISBN 9789768182760.
- Frauke Heard-Bey (1982). From Trucial States to United Arab Emirates: a society in transition. Longman, Harlow, Essex. ISBN 0582780322.

== See also ==
- History of the UAE
