= Al Ghubaiba (Dubai Metro) =

Rapid transit station in Dubai, United Arab Emirates

Al Ghubaiba الغبيبة

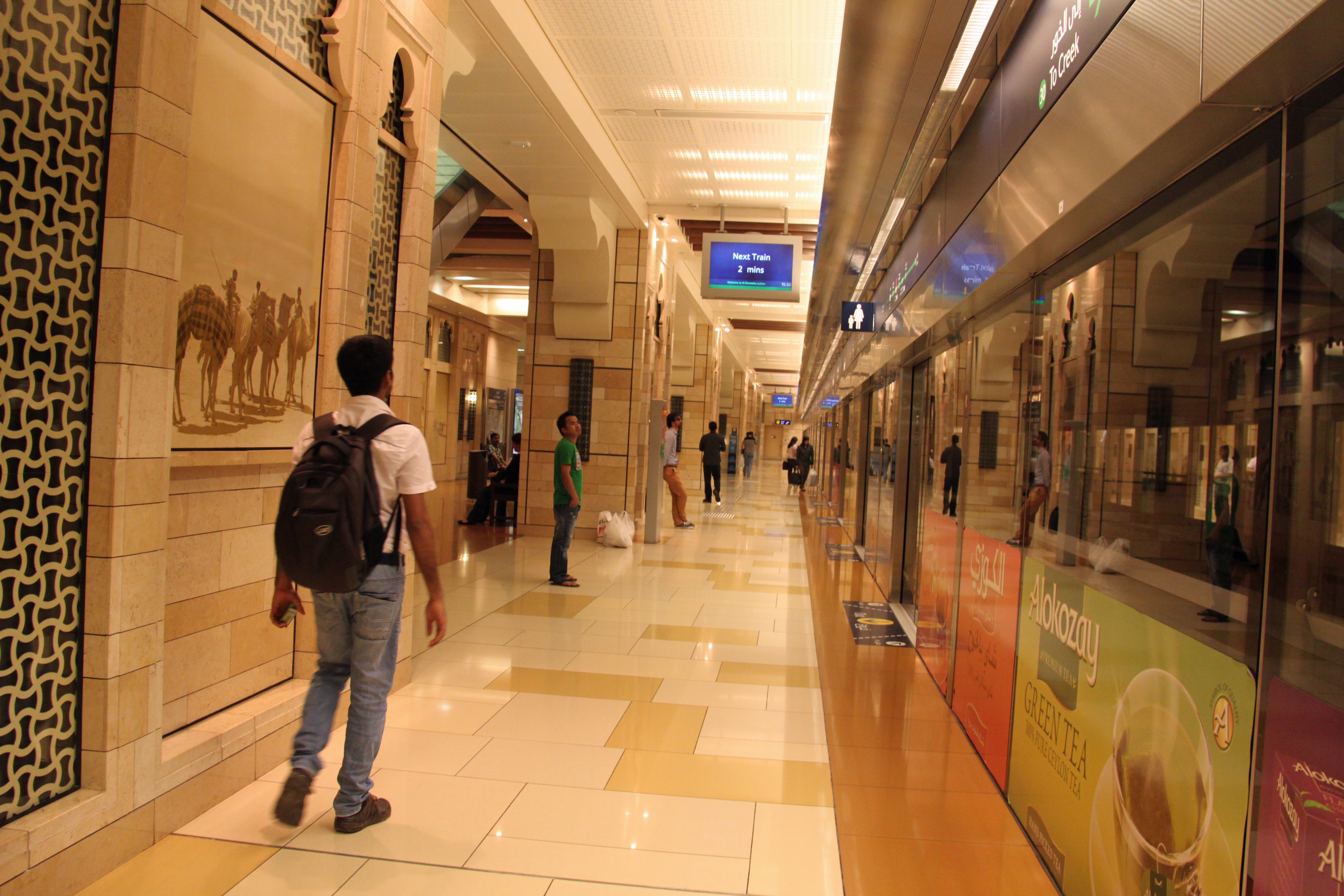
- Platform view

General information
- Location: 51 Road & Al Ghubaiba Road; Al Shindagha, Bur Dubai, Dubai; UAE
- Coordinates: 25.2650°N 55.2889°E
- System: Metro Station
- Line: Green Line
- Platforms: 2 side platforms
- Tracks: 2
- Connections: RTA Dubai: 6 Al Ghubaiba Stn. - Dubai Healthcare City; 8 Al Baraha Stn. - Ibn Battuta Stn.; 9 Al Ghubaiba Stn. - Business Bay MS; 12 Al Ghubaiba Stn. - Al Quoz Stn.; 15 Al Ghubaiba Stn. - Al Khail Gate; 21 Al Ghubaiba Stn. - Al Quoz Ind'l Area 4; 29 Al Ghubaiba Stn. - Dubai Mall; 33 Al Ghubaiba Stn. - Al Qusais Stn.; 44 Al Ghubaiba Stn. - Al Rashidiya Stn.; 61 Al Ghubaiba Stn. - Ras Al Khor, Samari Residence; 66 Al Ghubaiba Stn. - Al Faqa; 67 Al Ghubaiba Stn. - Dubai Endurance City; 83 Al Ghubaiba Stn. - Al Khail MS.; 93 Al Ghubaiba Stn. - MOE Stn.; 95 Al Ghubaiba Stn. - Jebel Ali Waterfront; X13 Lulu Village - Satwa Stn.; X23 Al Ghubaiba Stn. - International City; X92 Al Ghubaiba Stn. - Dubai Investment Park; C5 Al Ghubaiba Stn. - Gold Souq Stn.; E100 Al Ghubaiba Stn. - Abu Dhabi Central Stn.; E201 Al Ghubaiba Stn. - Al Ain Stn.; E306 Al Ghubaiba Stn. - Sharjah, Jubail Stn.; N55 Al Ghubaiba Stn. - Al Maktoum International Airport

Construction
- Structure type: Underground
- Accessible: yes

Other information
- Station code: 24
- Fare zone: 6

History
- Opened: September 9, 2011

Services
Preceding station	Dubai Metro	Following station
Sharaf DG towards Creek	Green Line	Al Ras towards e&
Location

Al Ghubaiba (Arabic: الغبيبة, Arabic pronunciation: [al ɣʊ ˈbej ba]) is a rapid transit station on the Green Line of the Dubai Metro in Dubai, UAE.

The station opened as part of the Green Line on 9 September 2011.

== Location ==
The station is located in Al Shindagha, Bur Dubai, traditionally the historic centre of Dubai. It is near the junction of 51 Road & Al Ghubaiba Road, with a number of entrances/exits. It is close to Al Ghubaiba Bus Station (which has intercity services including to Abu Dhabi and Sharjah) and City Centre Al Shindagha, as well as Dubai Creek. It is also close to several bus services.

== Station layout ==
Al Ghubaiba Metro Station has two side platforms and two tracks on each of its two floors.

G	Street level	Exit/Entrance
L1	Concourse	Automatic Fare Collection gates, station agent, crossover
L2	Side platform | Doors will open on the right
L2	Platform 1 Westbound	Towards ← E& Next Station: Al Ras
L2	Platform 2 Eastbound	Towards → Creek; Next Station: Sharaf DG
L2	Side platform | Doors will open on the right
