= Historical Documents Centre =

General information
- Location: Dubai, United Arab Emirates
- Opened: December 2016

The Historical Documents Centre is located in the Al-Shindagha neighbourhood in Dubai, United Arab Emirates that opened in December 2016. The centre aims to record the Emirate's historical achievements in the areas of culture, economy, and urban development as well as Dubai's relationships with other UAE emirates, Gulf states, and nations throughout the world.

== About the Centre ==
The Historical Documents Centre works to gather and acquire different historical records of Dubai, oversee the preservation of these documents from loss and damage, and conduct historical and documentary studies of the emirate. The centre uses strategies that promote awareness of the cultural significance of historical records. The centre also provides conferences, seminars, and workshops.

== The exhibitions ==
The Historical Documents Centre has nine exhibitions:

- The Shindagha Hall - displays documents of Ahmed Obaid Al Mansouri.
- Al Maktoum Hall - has documents of Dubai Rulers.
- The Economic Hall - displays documents related to trade and the economy.
- The Administrative Hall - contains documents related to government departments
- The Old Maps Hall
- The Newspapers Hall
- The Magazines Hall
- The Seals Hall
- The Signatures Hall
