= Al Buteen =

Al Buteen البطين
- Community
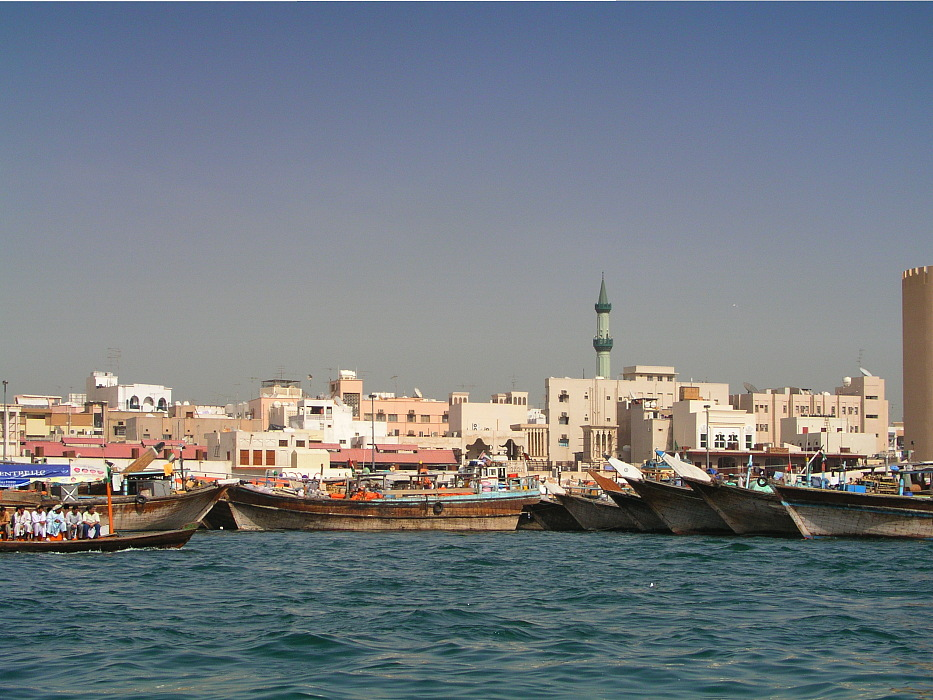
- Al Buteen, located off the Dubai Creek.
- Interactive map of Al Buteen
- Coordinates: 25.26858°N 55.29829°E
- Country: United Arab Emirates
- Emirate: Dubai
- City: Dubai

Area
  - Total: 0.07 km^{2} (0.027 sq mi)

Population (2000)
  - Total: 2,364
  - Density: 34,000/km^{2} (87,000/sq mi)

Al Buteen (Arabic: البطين) is a locality in Dubai, United Arab Emirates (UAE).

== Description ==
The locality is home to multiple stores and hotels. The community houses a part of Dubai Gold Souq.

== Location ==
Al Buteen is located in eastern Dubai, in Deira and is bounded to its west by Al Ras, its east by Al Sabkha and its north by Al Dhagaya. Dubai Creek forms the southern periphery of the locality.

Al Buteen is located between Old Baladiya Street (110th Road) and 21st Street. Due to its location in the central business district area of Deira, retail space in Al Buteen is expensive.

== Notable people ==
- Noor Al Suwaidi - artist and curator.
