= Heritage Village Dubai =

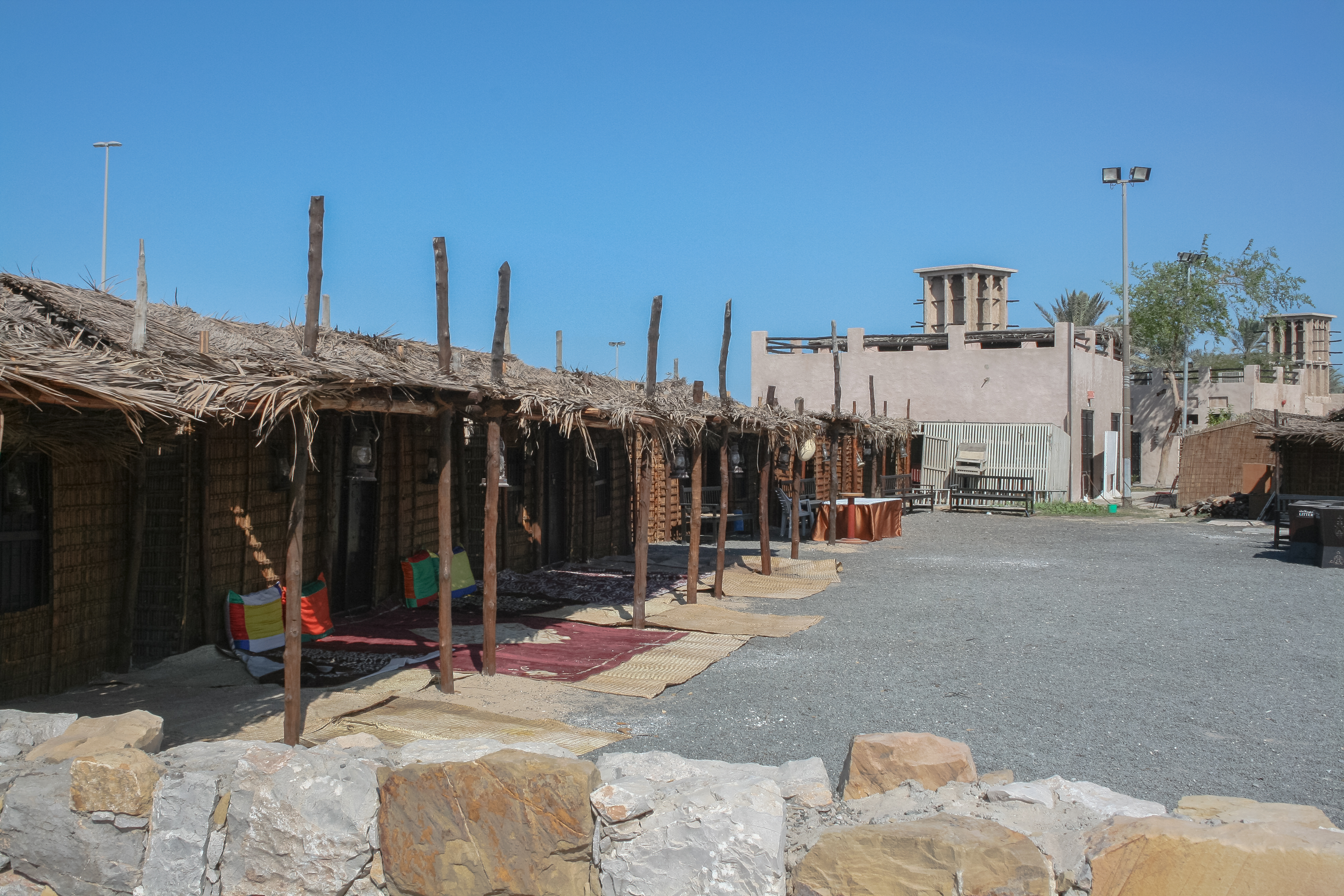
View of the Heritage Village.

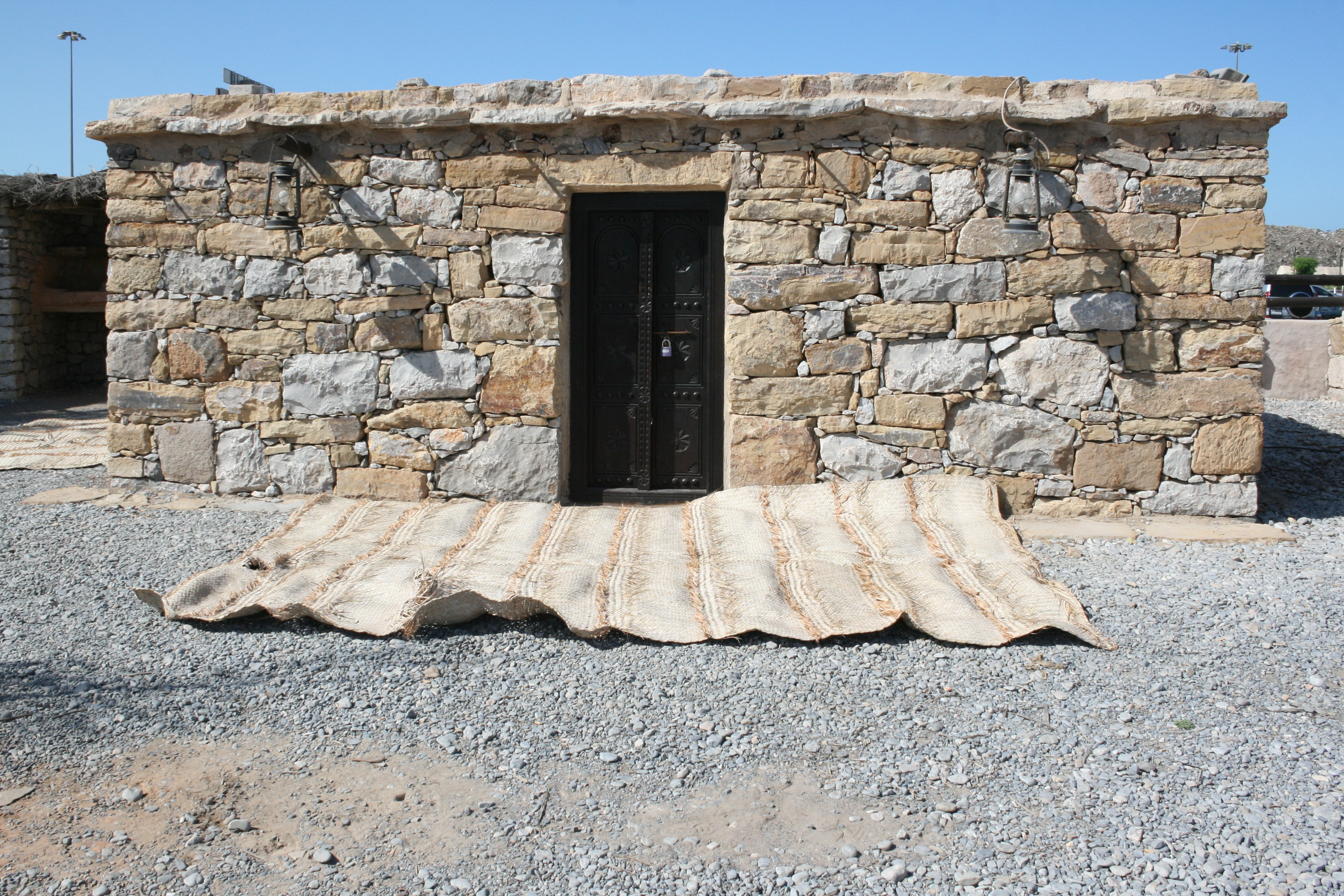
Heritage Village Dubai

The Heritage Village was created in 1997 in Al Shindagha Historical Neighborhood in Dubai, close to the Diving Village, to embrace the heritage events and to display a live image of the old traditional life in UAE. It represents the components of wild, marine, and mountain life, where the visitor can identify closely the old traditional customs of the country and the special characteristics of the old houses, handicrafts, patterns and forms of living. It is owned and managed by Dubai Culture & Arts Authority. Working hours at Dubai Heritage Village are Sunday to Thursday, 8:00- 22:00 and Friday and Saturday from 3:00 to 22:00.
