= Lahbab =

Lehbab لهباب
- Community
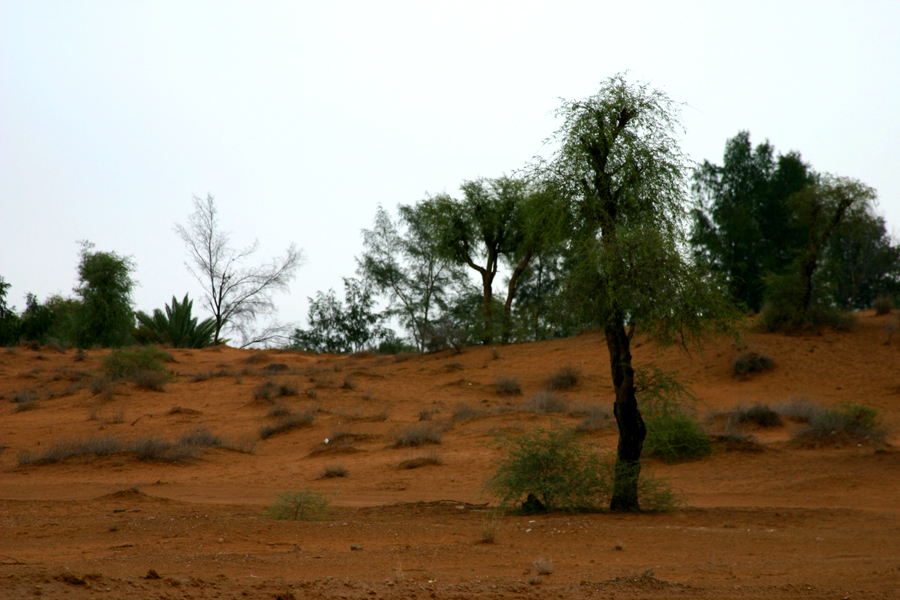
- Desert in Lehbab
- Interactive map of Lehbab
- Coordinates: 25.059745°N 55.608416°E
- Country: United Arab Emirates
- Emirate: Dubai
- City: Dubai

Area
  - Total: 97.0 km^{2} (37.5 sq mi)

Population
  - Total: 4,490
  - Density: 46.3/km^{2} (120/sq mi)
- Community number: 731, 831

Lehbab (Arabic: لهباب) is a community of the Emirate of Dubai, in the United Arab Emirates. It is located in Sector 7 and Sector 8 in South East Dubai.

== Territory ==
The territory of the community occupies an area of 97.0 km^{2} which develops in a non-urban area in eastern Dubai, on the border with the Emirate of Sharjah.

The community is divided into two subcommunities: Lehbab First (community 731) in the east, and Lehbab Second (community 831) in the west.

The area is bounded on the west by Umm Al Mo'meneen and Le Hemaira, on the south by Margham and Nazwah on the east, by the communities of Al Meryal and to the north by the community of Mereiyeel, Enkhali and Al Wohoosh.

The area is not currently served by the Dubai Metro. Center from Dubai-Hatta Road (E 44).

== Bibliography ==
- Dubai: The Complete Residents' Guide. Explorer Publishing & Distribution, 2006. June 2006. ISBN 9789768182760.
