= Grand Mosque of Dubai =

Mosque in Dubai, United Arab Emirates

Grand Mosque
- مسجد دبي الكبير
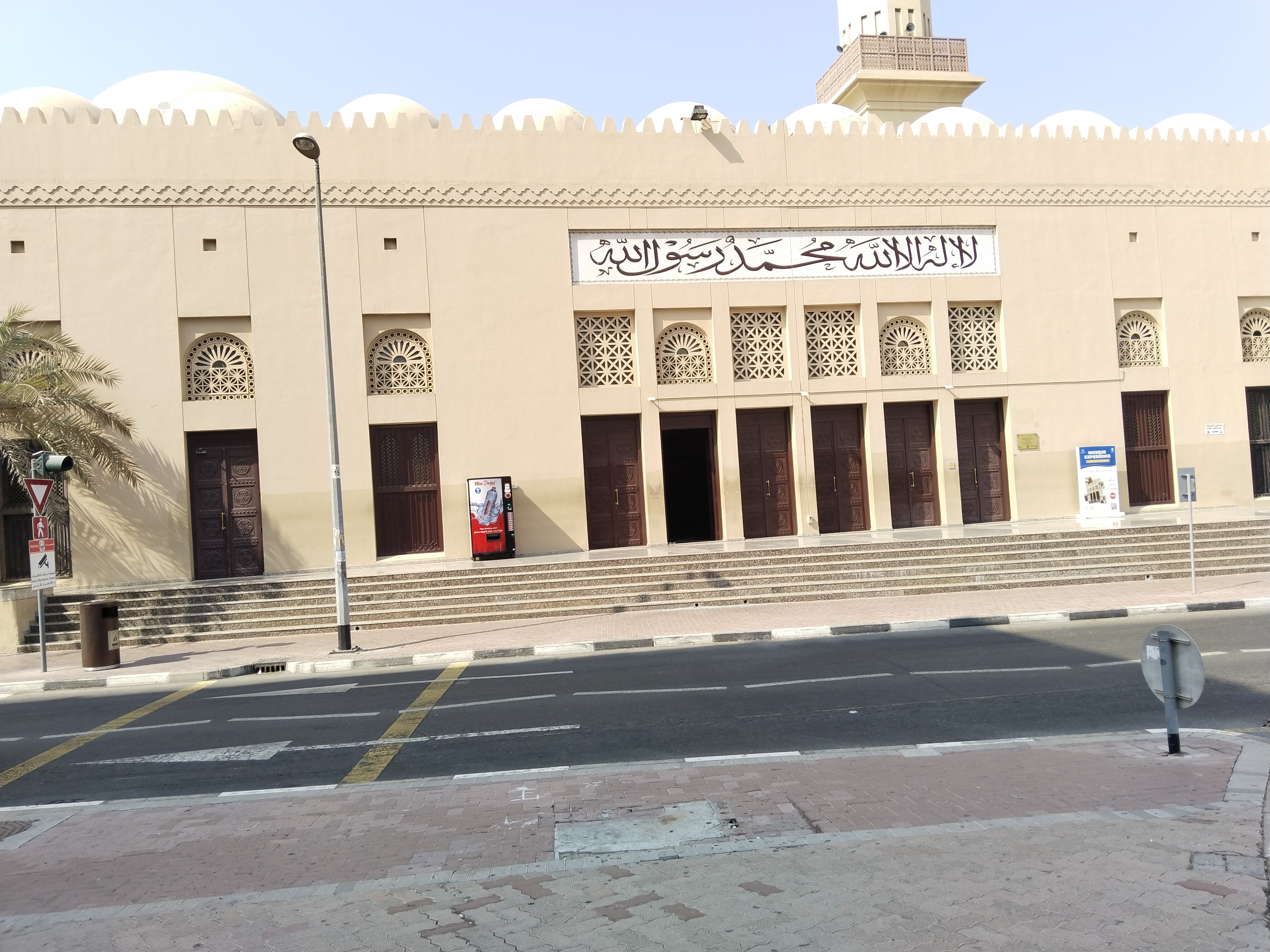

- United Arab Emirates

Religion
- Affiliation: Sunni Islam

Location
- Location: Dubai, Emirate of Dubai, United Arab Emirates
- Interactive map of Grand Mosque
- Coordinates: 25°15′52″N 55°17′48″E

Architecture
- Type: Mosque

Specifications
- Capacity: 1,200 worshipers
- Dome: 54
- Minaret height: 70 meters

The Grand Mosque (Arabic: مسجد دبي الكبير) is a mosque in Dubai, Emirate of Dubai, United Arab Emirates. It is located between the textile souk and the Dubai Museum close to a small stream in the Bur Dubai area. Originally built in 1900, demolished and built again in 1960, it then underwent a further rebuilding in 1998 (the present one). It now holds up to 1,200 worshippers. Non-Muslims are permitted to enter the Mosque daily from Sunday to Thursday from 9 AM to 11:30 AM for free tours. The mosque is the hub of Dubai's religious and cultural life.

== History ==
The mosque was originally a school devoted to study of the Qur'an, known as a kuttab, which welcomed its first students in the year 1900 to learn the Qur'an by rote. This building was replaced by a new mosque on the same site in 1960, which in turn was itself rebuilt in 1998, closer in style to the original of 1900. This mosque is one of the largest in Dubai and is dominant edifice in the old city.

== Architecture ==
The tallest feature of the mosque is the 70-metre (230 ft) minaret, the tallest in Dubai, which resembles a lighthouse. The sandy-grey walls are generally unadorned, but there is a large Quranic inscription inlaid above the five columns of the entrance facade, which sit at the top of a short flight of six steps. The 45 small and nine larger domes with the tall minaret cover the roof of the Grand Mosque. The wooden windows are fitted with hand-made stained glass and blend well with the old town of Bur Dubai, and its minaret is designed in Anatolian architectural style. Visitors to the mosque are advised to dress conservatively. The mosque has a capacity of up to 1,200 worshippers. Nearest metro station is Al Fahidi.

== See also ==
- Jumeirah Mosque
- Islam in the United Arab Emirates
