= Noor Al Suwaidi =

- نور السويدي
- Born: 1981 (age 44–45); Abu Dhabi
- Education: American University; Kingston University
- Occupations: Artist; curator
- Website: nooralsuwaidi.com

Noor Al Suwaidi (Arabic: نور السويدي; born 1981) is an artist and curator from the United Arab Emirates.

== Biography ==
Al Suwaidi was born in 1981. She grew up in Abu Dhabi. She went to the Al Khansaa government school in Al Buteen. She has three sisters and one brother. It was clear she had artistic talent from a young age, talent which was nurtured by her father in particular. She graduated in 2004 with a BA in Studio Art from the American University. In 2009 she graduated from Kingston University with an MA in Curating Contemporary Design. She was the first person from the Middle East to study on her MA course. Prior to studying for her MA she worked for Dubai Holdings. She is a part-time lecturer at the College of Art and Creative Enterprises at Zayed University in Abu Dhabi. As a curator of contemporary art, she specialises in the work of other Emirati artists. She is a founding member of the Cultural and Arts Authority in Dubai. In 2017 she was invited by the Louvre Abu Dhabi to discuss Bellini's Madonna and Child.

Al Suwaidi has described how her figurative paintings can reflect Arabic calligraphy. Her artistic practice focusses on work in paint and collage. In 2011 her work Bare with Me was sold at Christie's as part of a wider sale of Arab, Iranian and Turkish contemporary art. She has taken part in a number of artistic residencies in London, Rome and Berlin. In 2011 she held her first solo exhibition in London at the Cork Street Gallery, which was entitled Like Coral I Create Clouds. A number of her works are held in the collection of the Barjeel Art Foundation, including paintings Landscape of Colour and Dreamers, as well as the sculptural work The Head.
