= Gold Souq (Dubai Metro) =

Metro station in Dubai, UAE

Gold Souq سوق الذهب

- Station entrance in 2012

General information
- Location: Al Khaleej Road; Al Corniche, Dubai; UAE
- Coordinates: 25.2761°N 55.3017°E
- System: Metro station
- Line: Green Line
- Platforms: 2 side platforms
- Tracks: 2
- Connections: RTA Dubai: 8 Al Baraha Bus Stn. - Ibn Battuta Bus Stn.; 10 Gold Souq Bus Stn. - Al Quoz Bus Stn.; 13 Gold Souq Bus Stn. - Al Qusais DM Housing; 13A Gold Souq Bus Stn. - Al Qusais Bus Stn.; 13D Gold Souq Bus Stn. - Al Qusais Bus Stn.; 25 Gold Souq Bus Stn. - Al Rashidiya Bus Stn.; 43 Gold Souq Bus Stn. - Al Qusais Ind'l Area 2 via Airport Terminal 2; 53 Gold Souq Bus Stn. - International City; 64 Gold Souq Bus Stn. - Ras Al Khor; 95 Al Baraha Bus Stn - Jebel Ali Waterfront Labour Camp; 13B Gold Souq Bus Stn. - Al Qusais Bus Stn.; 91A Gold Souq Bus Stn. - Jebel Ali Bus Stn.; X02 Union MS - Al Satwa; X13 LuLu Village - Al Satwa Bus Stn.; X94 Gold Souq Bus Stn. -; C01 Airport Terminal 3 - Al Satwa Bus Stn.; C03 Abu Hail MS - Al Karama Bus Stn.; C04 Gold Souq Bus Stn. - Jaddaf; C05 Gold Souq Bus Stn. - Al Ghubaiba Bus Stn.; C09 Al Satwa Bus Stn. - Al Qiyadah MS; C18 Sheikh Rashid Colony - Oud Metha Bus Stn.

Construction
- Structure type: Underground
- Accessible: yes

Other information
- Station code: 22
- Fare zone: 5

History
- Opened: 9 September 2011
- Former names: Palm Deira (until May 2020)

Services
| Preceding station | Dubai Metro | Following station |
|---|---|---|
| Al Ras towards Creek | Green Line | Baniyas Square towards e& |
Location

Gold Souq (Arabic: سوق الذهب) is a rapid transit station on the Green Line of the Dubai Metro in Dubai, UAE. Until May 2020, it was named Palm Deira.

== History ==
The station, originally named Palm Deira, was opened along with the initial stretch of the Green Line from Etisalat to Dubai Healthcare City on 9 September 2011.

Controversy arose over the existence of a ban on carrying fish on the metro and the station's location near the city's largest fish market at that time.

In July 2014, the Gold Souq bus station, one of the largest bus stations in Dubai, was relocated to outside Palm Deira metro station. Initially intended to be a temporary change, it became permanent.

The station was renamed to Gold Souq in May 2020.

In 2021, as part of the Deira Enrichment Project, the One Deira Mall was constructed on the ground above the station.

== Location ==
Gold Souq metro station is located in the northern section of Deira in the historic centre of Dubai. It is named after the Gold Souq bus station, which in turn is named after the nearby Dubai Gold Souk. Other nearby attractions include Hyatt Regency and Golf Park. The artificial Dubai Islands, consisting of the completed islands of the unfinished Palm Deira project, are located offshore.

== Station layout ==
Like other central stations on the Dubai Metro, Gold Souq is located below ground level. It lies underneath Al Khaleej Road before the tracks make a sharp turn to the southeast on their way to Baniyas Square. There are two side platforms with two tracks, a similar setup to most Metro stations.

The Gold Souq bus station and One Deira Mall are located atop the station.

| G | Street level | Exit/Entrance |
| L1 | Concourse | Automatic Fare Collection gates, station agent, crossover |
| L2 | Side platform | Doors will open on the right |
| L2 | Platform 2 Westbound | Towards ← Creek; Next Station: Al Ras |
| L2 | Platform 1 Eastbound | Towards → E& Next Station: Baniyas Square |
| L2 | Side platform | Doors will open on the right |
