= Al Ras Public Library =

Library in Dubai, UAE

Coordinates: 25.26625°N 55.29327°E

- Location: Al Ras, Deira, Dubai, UAE
- Established: 1963

Collection
- Size: Over 100,000 books; over 170 periodicals

Al Ras Public Library (Arabic: مكتبة الرأس) is the oldest public library in Dubai, United Arab Emirates. It opened in 1963. It is located in Al Ras, Deira. The library is part of Dubai Public Libraries.

== History ==
Al Ras Public Library was the first public library in Dubai, inaugurated by Sheikh Rashid bin Saeed Al Maktoum in 1963.

The library underwent renovation work in September 2019.

== Collection ==
The library includes more than 100,000 books in a number of languages and over 170 periodicals. The library has an activity room, audio-visual facilities, a reading hall, and a separate section for children's literature.

== Public transportation ==
The nearest Dubai Metro station is Al Ras on the Green Line.

== See also ==
- Dubai Public Library
- Mohammed Bin Rashid Library
