= Mohammed Bin Rashid Library =

Library in Dubai, United Arab Emirates

- View of the library, looking across Dubai Creek from the InterContinental Dubai Festival City
- Location: Al Jaddaf, Dubai, United Arab Emirates
- Established: 16 June 2022; 4 years ago

Collection
- Size: 1.5 million printed books, two million digital books and one million audio books

Other information
- Budget: 1 billion AED
- Website: www.dm.gov.ae

The Mohammed Bin Rashid Library (MBRL) is a large library in the Al Jaddaf locality of Dubai, United Arab Emirates, on Dubai Creek that opened to the public on 16 June 2022.

== Overview ==
The design of the library is inspired by the shape of a lectern. The main features of this library are a conference centre, exhibition spaces, a children's library, a bookshop on the ground floor, reading halls, service areas, a business library, and training halls. The basement of the library was designed to accommodate around a thousand cars.

The project took more than six years to complete at a cost of AED1 billion. About 300,000 to 400,000 volumes will be available in the library's open-access section. The library has book handling and information systems. The library has been designed by consortium of 'asp' Architekten Stuttgart, Obermeyer Planen+Beraten Munich, and the ACG Architecture Consulting Group. The structural design of the library and its foundation system was awarded from ACG to S. A. MIRO, INC. for their experience in designing complicated structures similar to the library. The project's main contractor was ASGC Construction, a Dubai-based construction group.

== History ==
Sheikh Mohammed Bin Rashid Al Maktoum announced the conception of the library in February 2016, the "Year of Reading" in Dubai. Designed in the shape of an open book on a lectern, the seven-story library covers 650,000 square feet of property and is expected to facilitate 9 million visitors annually. The Mohammed Bin Rashid Library will house more than 4.5 million printed, digital, and audio books. The AED1 billion contract for the construction for the Mohammed Bin Rashid Library is the largest cultural project in Dubai. Construction began in September 2016, to be completed by mid-2018. As of December 2017, the construction of the library was 22% completed. In 2018, it was 72% complete.

The library was due to open in 2018 but was still under construction in 2019. As of February 2020, the facade was complete, the main structure was topped out, and the interior in late stages of development. The library was opened to public on 16 June 2022 and hosted a meeting of the Dubai Executive Council on 23 June 2022.

== Services ==
The library encompasses eight specialized collections, including an information centre, a media centre, an Arabic library, an international library, a public library, a business library, a youth library, a children's library, a family library, and a reading corner. Furthermore, the library will include a centre for conservation and preservation of books, manuscripts and documents, as well as a special library for the Al Maktoum Collection. The library is expecting to host more than 100 cultural and intellectual events every year, along with a permanent art gallery. The inclusion of a Civilization museum and an Arab Heritage Museum will allow people to embrace their Arab identity through heritage preservation initiatives. The library includes a 500-seat theatre for lectures and seminars for launching intellectual and cultural events regionally and globally.

The MBR Library will have modern technology to serve scientific research and dissemination of knowledge. Hussein Nasser Lootah, Director-General of Dubai Municipality, has stated that the MBR Library will be a "world accredited reference in Arabic language and a destination for specialists, scientists, writers, poets, intellectuals, talented minds, and students. It will also serve as an incubation for publishers."

The nearest Dubai Metro station is Creek on the Green Line with a shaded path under construction to link with the library.

== Library pillars ==
Just as the pillars of wisdom in the ages of wisdom were six pillars, the Mohammed bin Rashid Library also relies on and is based on six pillars that form its message, establish its distinction, and multiply its impact. The six pillars are:

1. Main Library and Specialized Libraries.
2. Encouraging reading.
3. Publishing content.
4. Supporting authorship and translation.
5. Protecting the Arabic language.
6. Preserving cultural heritage.

== See also ==
- Al Ras Public Library, Dubai's oldest public library
- Dubai Public Library, with a number of branches around Dubai
