= Al Dhagaya =

Al Dhagaya الضغاية
- Community
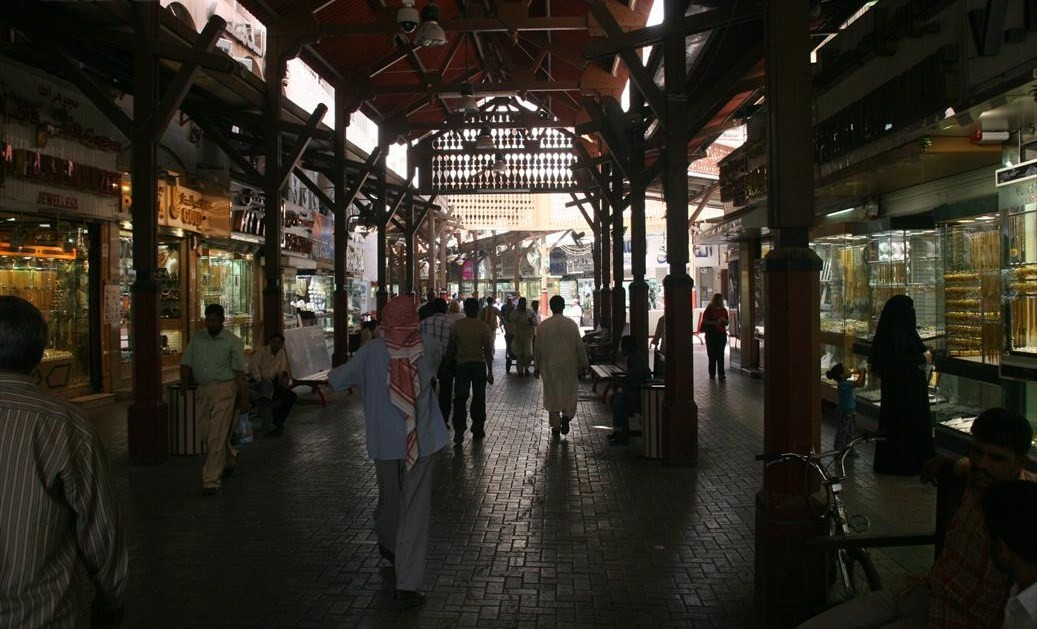
- Interior of the Gold Souk in Al Dhagaya
- Interactive map of Al Dhagaya
- Coordinates: 25.27185°N 55.29893°E
- Country: United Arab Emirates
- Emirate: Dubai
- City: Dubai

Area
  - Total: 0.125 km^{2} (0.048 sq mi)

Population (2000)
  - Total: 10,896
  - Density: 87,200/km^{2} (226,000/sq mi)
- Community number: 113

Al Dhagaya (Arabic: الضغاية) is a locality in Dubai, United Arab Emirates (UAE). Located in eastern Dubai in Deira, Al Dhagaya forms part of Dubai's northeastern coast along the Persian Gulf. Al Dhagaya is located near the Deira Corniche and is bounded by Al Baraha, Al Ras, Al Sabkha and Ayil Nasir.

One of the more populous residential areas of west Deira, Al Dhagaya also has a prominent economic district with souks and traditional markets. It also has hotels and mosques. The Dubai Gold Souk and Dubai Spice Souk are located at the heart of Al Dhagaya. Additionally, several other traditional shops stores such as ARY Jewellery, Joy Alukkas Jewellery and the Dubai Fish and Vegetable Market are located in Al Dhagaya.

Al Dhagaya's northern periphery lies along the Dubai Corniche; the Al Shindagha Tunnel, which connects Deira to Bur Dubai, runs through the northern coast of Al Dhagaya.
