= Sheikh Mohammed Centre for Cultural Understanding =

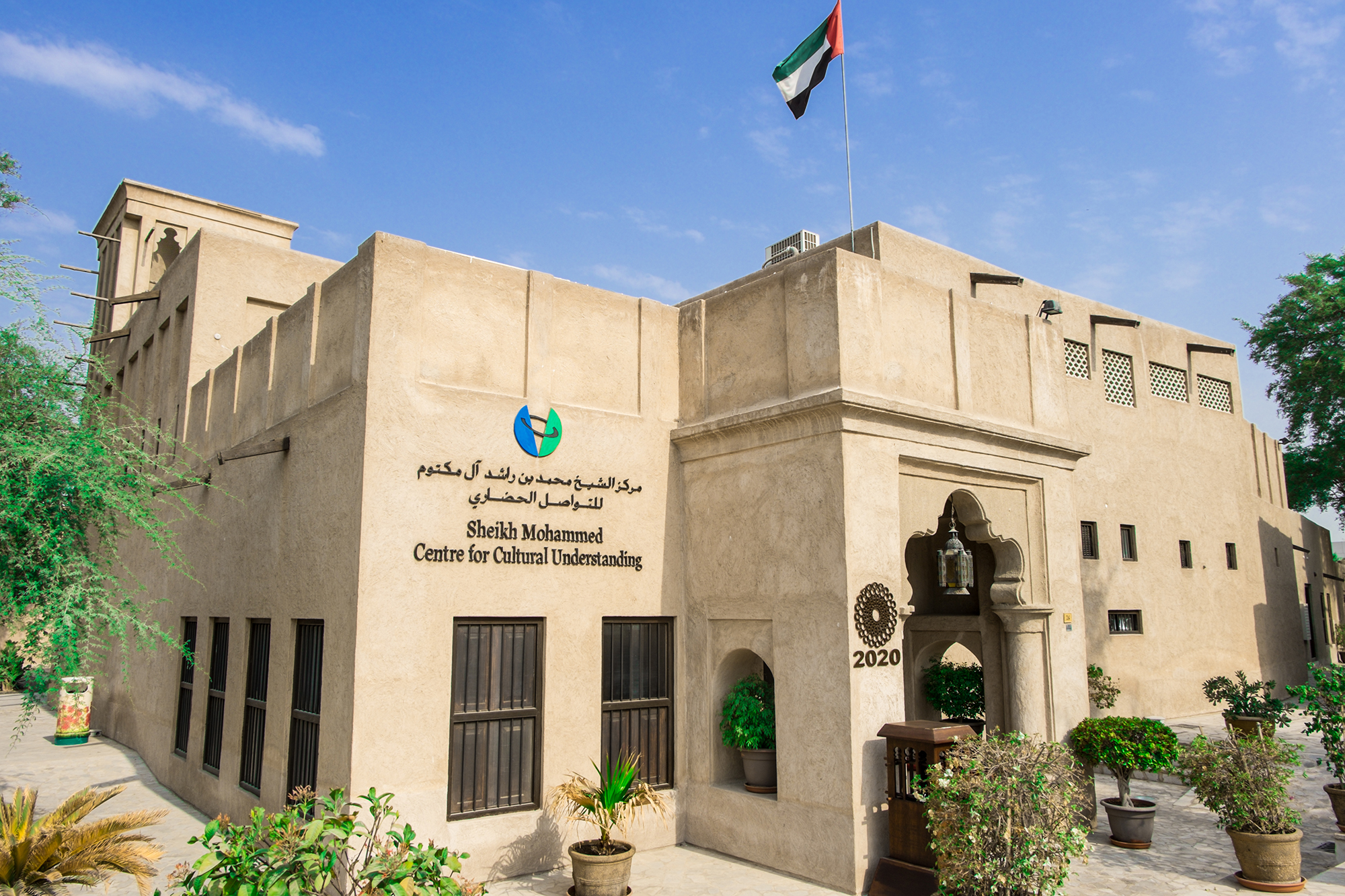
Sheikh Mohammed bin Rashid Al Maktoum Centre for Cultural Understanding in Al Fahidi Historical Neighbourhood

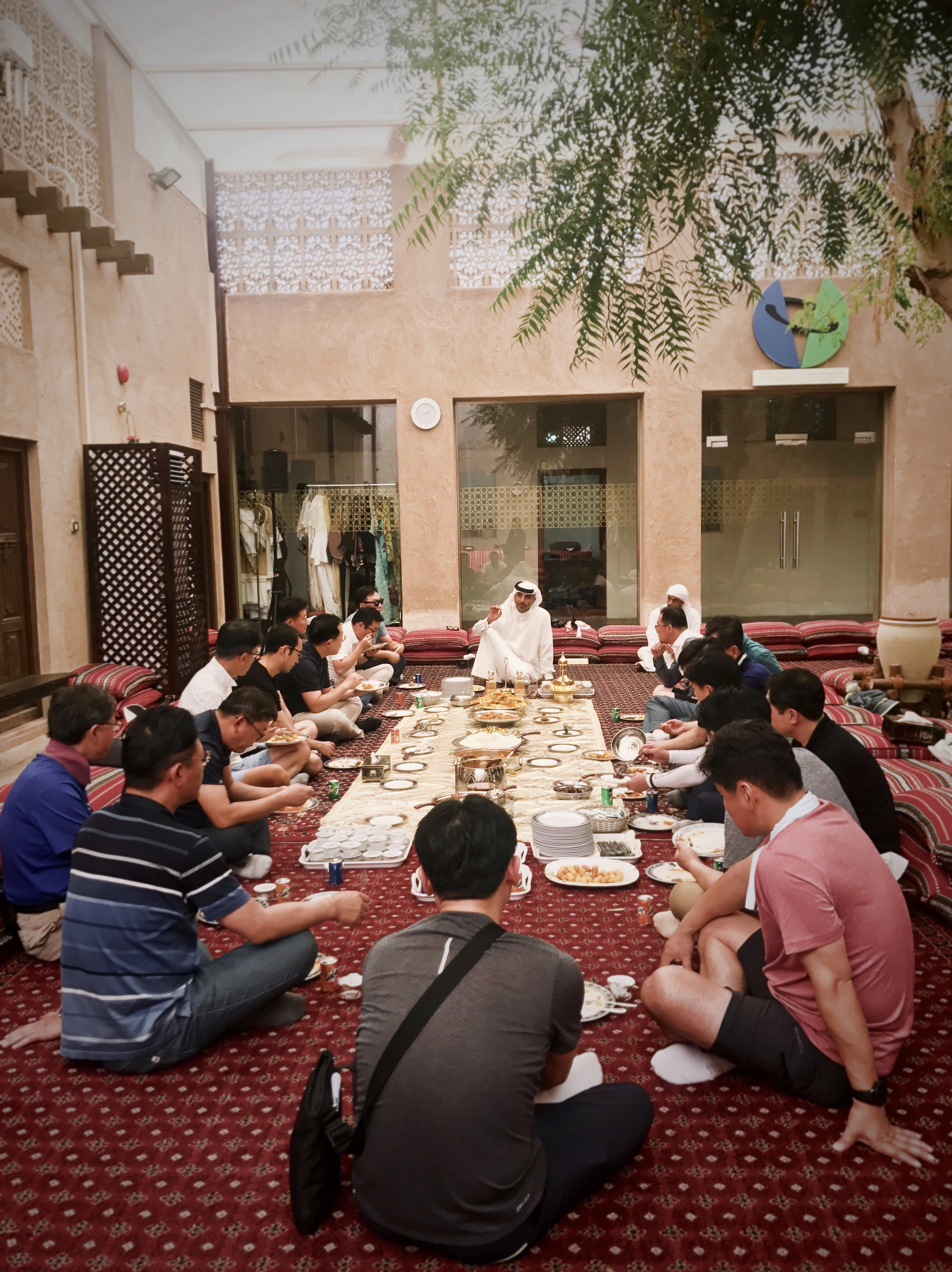
Visitors share a meal.

The Sheikh Mohammed bin Rashid Al Maktoum Centre for Cultural Understanding (Arabic: مركز الشيخ محمد بن راشد آل مكتوم للتواصل الحضاري; SMCCU) is a non-profit organisation which promotes awareness of Emirati culture, customs, traditions and religion among expatriates and foreign visitors in the United Arab Emirates, as well as aiming to remove cultural barriers.

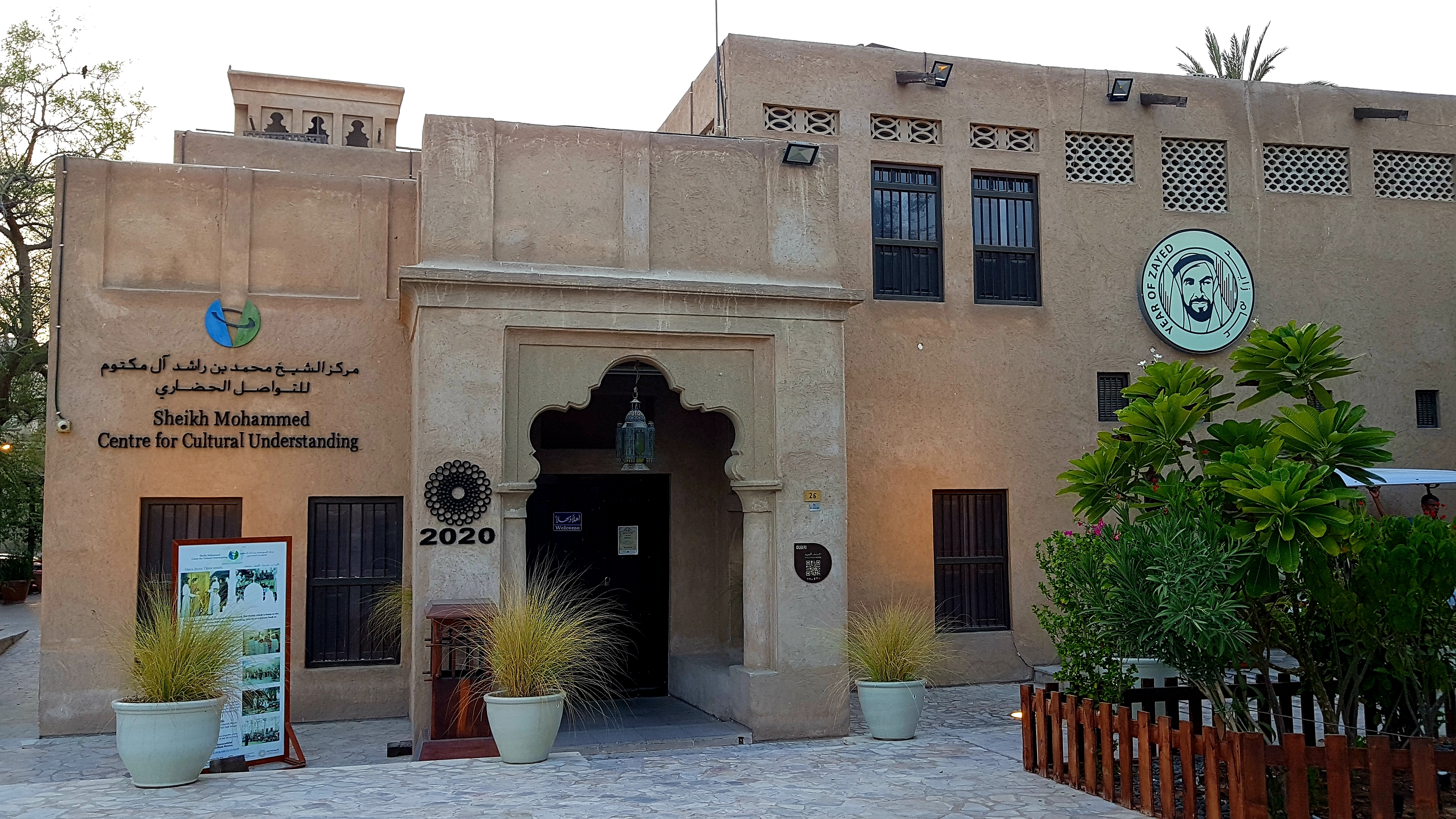
Shaikh Mohammad Centre for Cultural Understanding - 2018

SMCCU was founded in 1998 by Sheikh Mohammed IV and is based in a traditional Emirati wind tower house, located in Bur Dubai's historic Al Fahidi neighbourhood. It operates under the banner of "Open Doors. Open Minds." The centre arranges numerous activities, including tours of heritage sites and landmarks in Dubai, educational programs for students, cultural awareness events, lectures, Arabic classes (in local Gulf dialect), iftars during Ramadan, as well as providing the experience of traditional Emirati food.

== See also ==
- Culture of Dubai
- Dubai Culture and Arts Authority
- Jumeirah Mosque Dubai
- List of Emirati artists
- Tourism in Dubai
