= Jumeirah Mosque =

Mosque in Dubai, United Arab Emirates

- مسجد جميرا
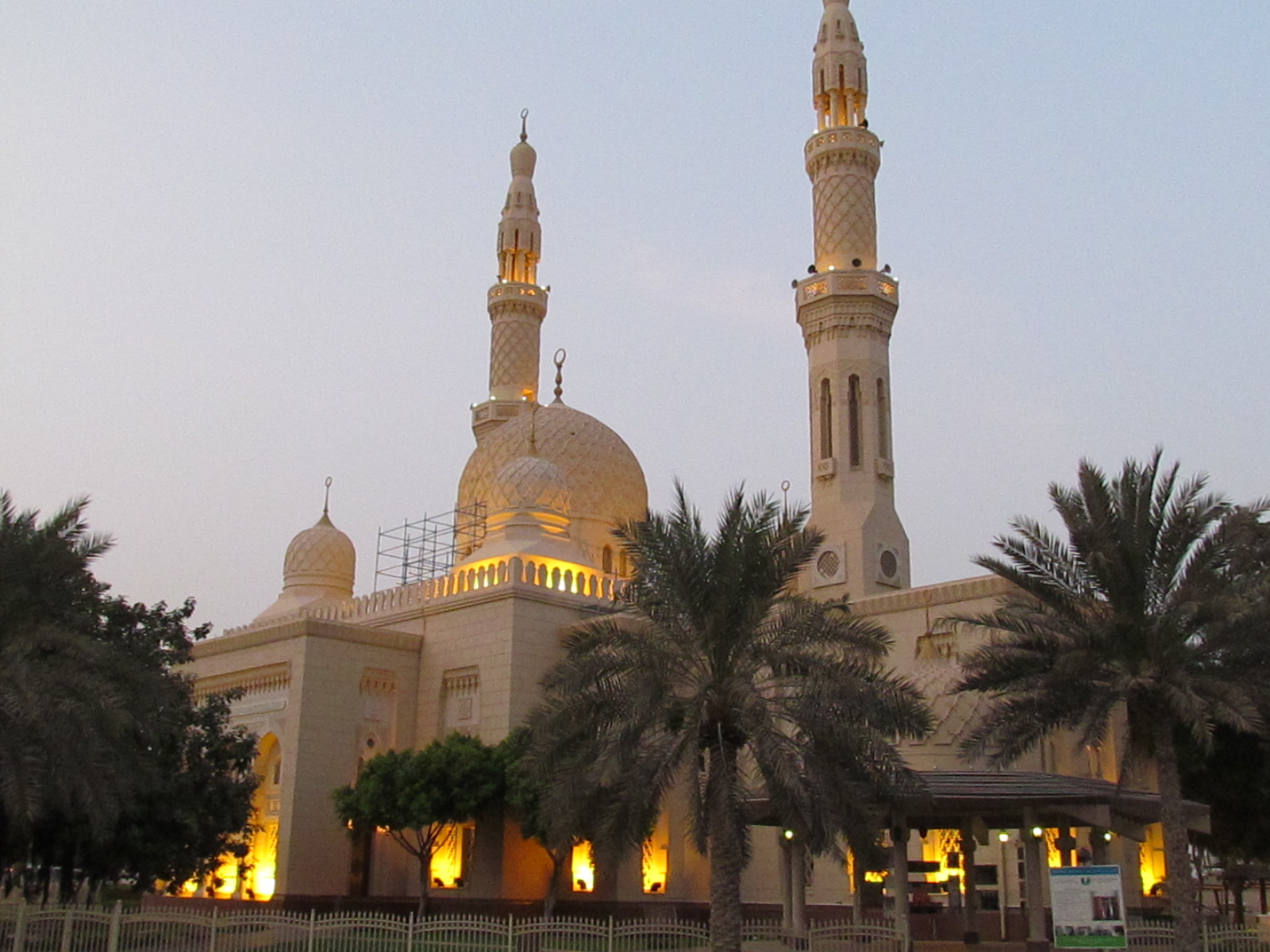
- Outside view of mosque in the evening

- United Arab Emirates

Religion
- Affiliation: Islam

Location
- Location: Dubai, Emirate of Dubai, United Arab Emirates
- Interactive map of Jumeirah Mosque
- Coordinates: 25.2340°N 55.2655°E

Architecture
- Type: Mosque
- Style: Islamic Architecture
- Established: 1979
- Groundbreaking: 1975

Jumeirah Mosque (Arabic: مسجد جميرا) is a mosque in Dubai, Emirate of Dubai, United Arab Emirates. Construction began in 1975 and the mosque opened in 1979; the mosque is built in a combination of historical Islamic architectural styles, including Fatimid and Mamluk. It was a gift from the late Sheikh Rashid bin Saeed Al Maktoum, the former Ruler of Dubai to his son and heir, Sheikh Mohammed bin Rashid Al Maktoum.

The mosque is overseen by the Sheikh Mohammed Centre for Cultural Understanding (SMCCU), a tourist outreach organization founded by the Sheikh Mohammed. It can accommodate up to 1,200 worshippers. The mosque is one of few in Dubai accessible to non-Muslim visitors, who can only enter going on the tour organized by the SMCCU. The complex also features a museum and a majlis that can be rented for special events.

== History of Jumeirah Mosque ==
The Jumeirah mosque was built in the year 1979 by architects Abd al-Muʿizz Husayn and Muhammad al-Mahdi Hegazy of Hegazy Engineering Consultancy. It was commissioned by Sheikh Rashid bin Saeed Al Maktoum as a present to the now-current ruler HH Sheikh Mohammed bin Rashid Al Maktoum. The mosque in the Jumeirah district along the Persian Gulf, known for its tourist-oriented beach resorts and large expatriate population. Jumeirah was heavily developed during the "Oil Era," when Dubai gained great wealth due to the discovery of oil.

The Jumeirah Mosque served as the headquarters of the SMCCU, an organization associated with Sheik Mohammed, until the group moved to the Bur Dubai neighborhood.

=== Depiction on currency ===
The 2003 series of the 500 dirham note depicted the Jumeirah mosque, but has since been replaced by the Burj Khalifa.

== Architecture ==
=== Exterior ===
The mosque is built out of yellow-pink sandstone. The two minarets and a dome are embellished with deep relief carvings, characteristic of Egyptian Mamluk architecture, although official sources only claim Fatimid architecture as inspiration. Notably, both styles are present in Cairo, where Hegazy Engineering Consultancy is based. There are two entrances to the mosque, one along Jumeirah Street intended for tourists, and another on the opposite of the building for worshippers coming to pray. The entrance intended for Muslims bears Quranic epigraphy from the Surah At-Tawbah, stressing the importance of daily prayer. Fountains are present in the outside courtyard for wudu.

=== Interior ===
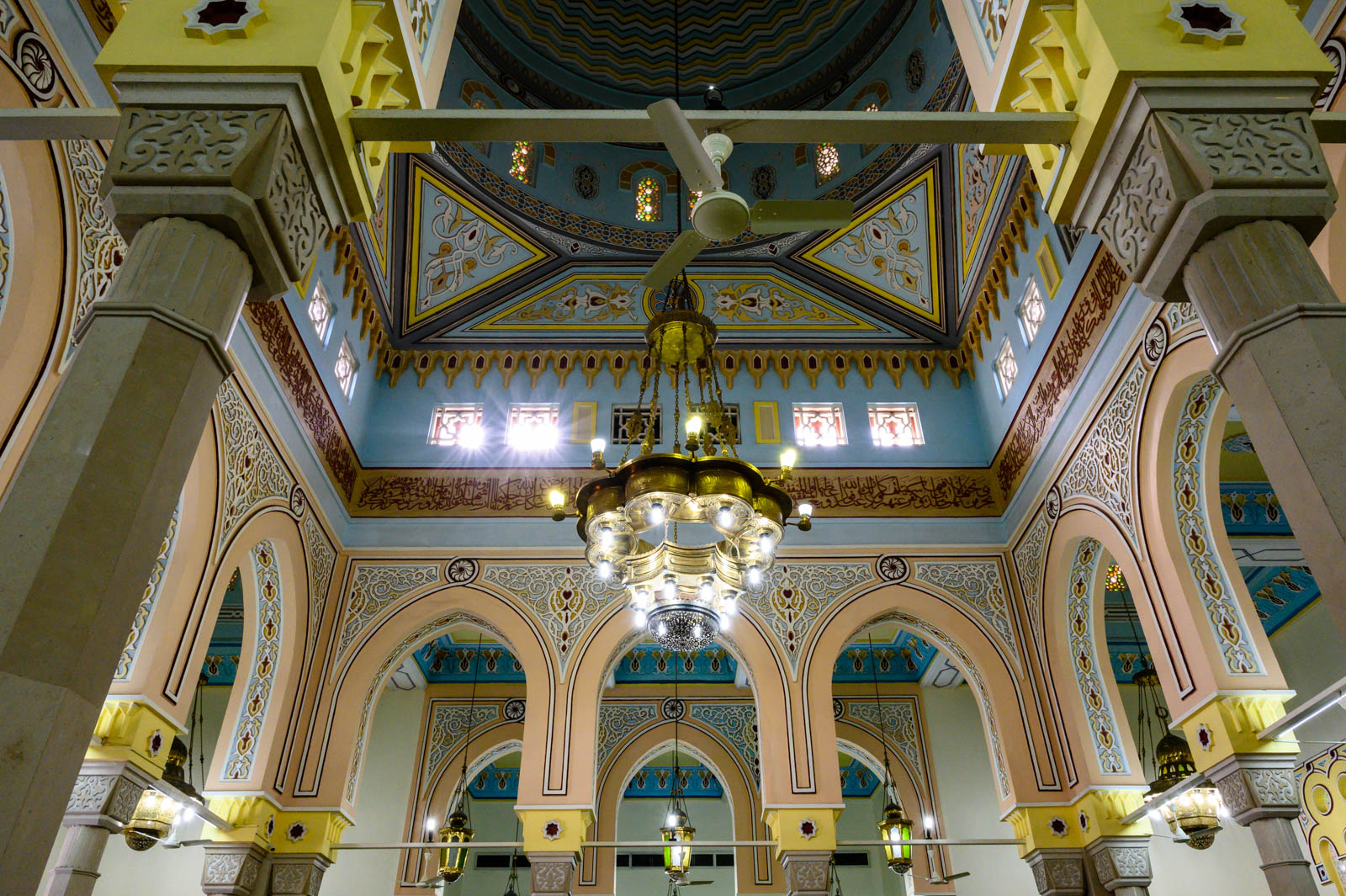
Interior view of Jumeirah Mosque, underneath a dome.

Columns are arranged in a hypostyle design around the central dome, an arrangement originating in Seljuk architecture also used by the Mamluks. The floor is covered in a large carpet adorned with floral patterns. The epigraphy within mosque's prayer hall recites the Victory verse of the Qur'an, common found in religious sites established by governments.

The interior ornament bears visual similarities to the Alhambra, a complex built by the Nasrids in Spain that has inspired architectural homages both in Muslim world and in the West. As written in Owen Jones' 1856 Grammar of Ornament, which popularized the ornament of the Alhambra:

"With the Moors, as a general rule, the primary colours were used on the upper portions of objects, the secondary and tertiary on the lower. This also appears to be in accordance with a natural law; we have primary blue in the sky.." (p. 199)

The levels of the Jumeirah Mosque's interior are painted beige, yellow, salmon pink, and blue in ascending order, with blue acting as the "sky" as it also covers the interior of the dome. Though the mosaic lining the dome also resembles traditional Islamic design, the usage of non-primary colors throughout the lower half of the mosque marks a departure from the style.

== Tourist experience ==
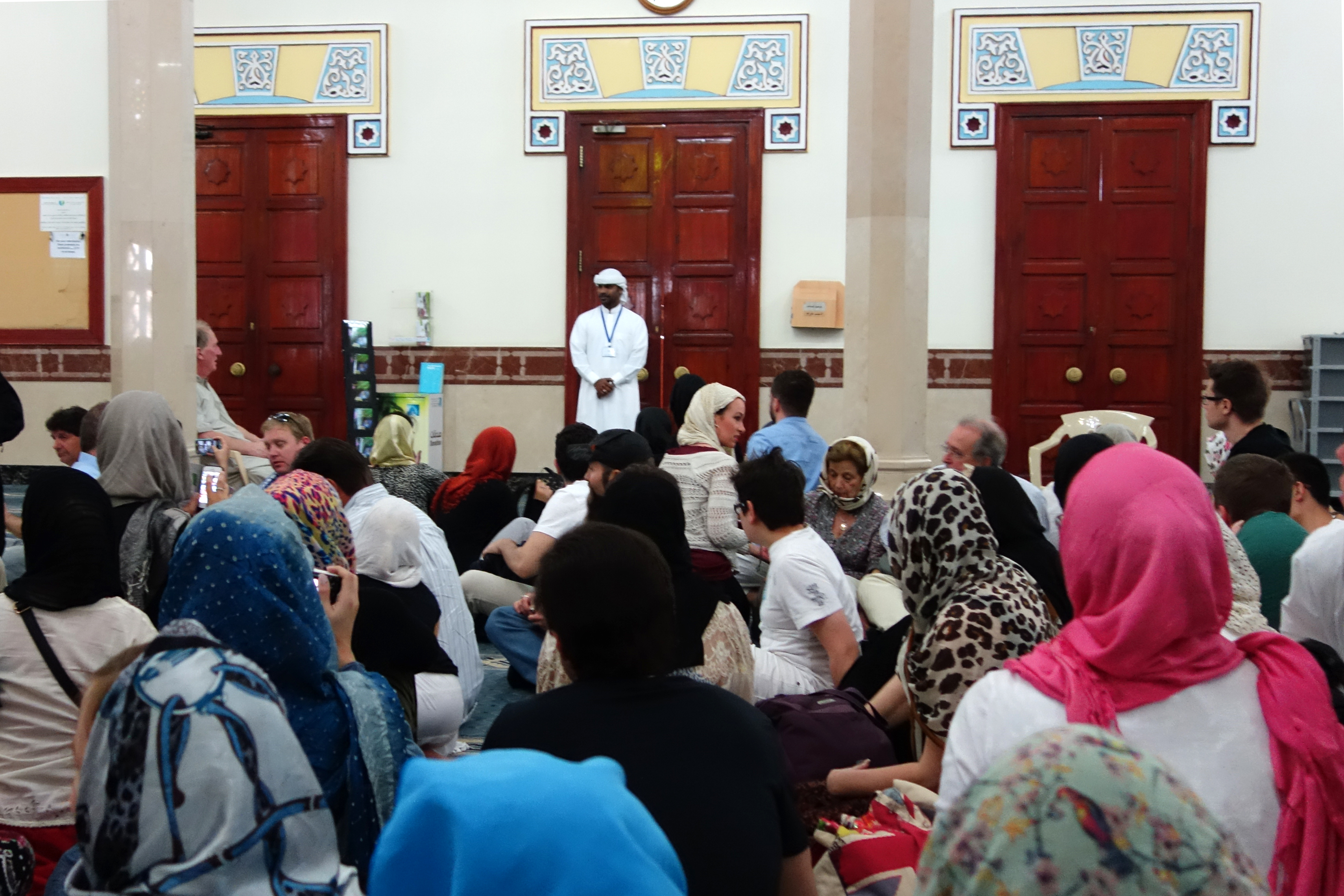
Visitors sitting in Jumeirah Mosque in front of their guide.

A tour of the Jumeirah mosque is a key activity of the "Open Doors. Open Minds." program of the SMCCU, meant to teach non-Muslim visitors about Islam and Arab culture rather than about the mosque itself. Topics covered include the Five Pillars of Islam, ablution, and the basics of Islamic prayer and end in a Q&A session. Visitors must follow standard mosque dress standards: adults must wear modest clothing and women must wear headscarves. Tours are led by individual Muslim guides of varying national and ethnic backgrounds, and take place outside of times of prayer.

The complex also features multiple areas largely intended for tourists: the on-site Once Upon a Time museum covering the history of Dubai; the majlis, which includes a gift shop; and a dining area where Emirati food is served prior to tours.

== See also ==
- Grand Mosque (Dubai)
- Islam in the United Arab Emirates
- Sheikh Mohammed Centre for Cultural Understanding
