= Al Sabkha =

Al Sabkha السبخة
- Community
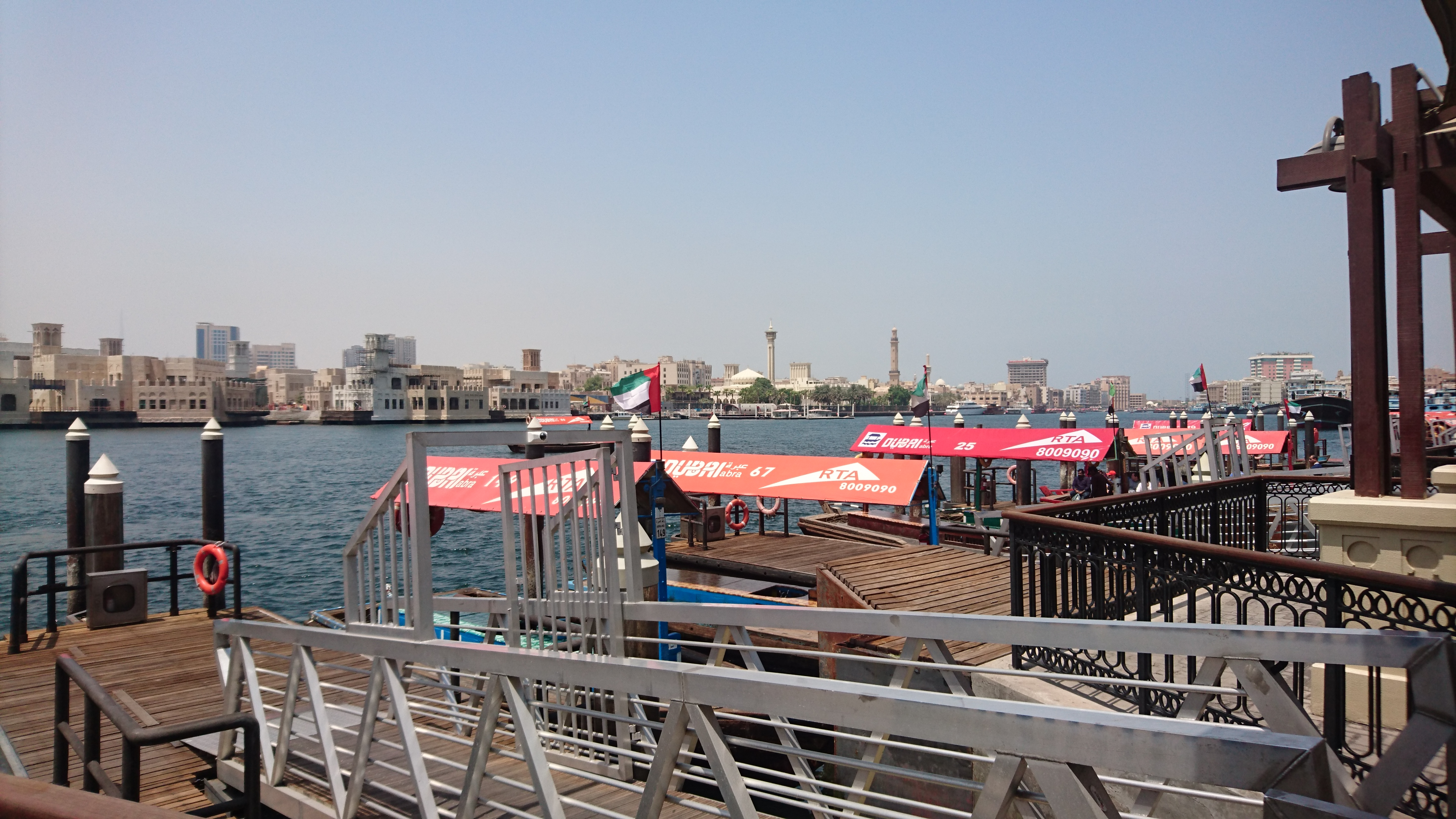
- Dubai abra at Al Sabkha Marine Transport Station
- Interactive map of Al Sabkha
- Coordinates: 25.26905°N 55.30144°E
- Country: United Arab Emirates
- Emirate: Dubai
- City: Dubai

Area
  - Total: 0.13 km^{2} (0.050 sq mi)

Population (2000)
  - Total: 2,627
  - Density: 20,000/km^{2} (52,000/sq mi)
- Community number: 115

Al Sabkha (Arabic: السبخة) is a locality in Dubai, United Arab Emirates (UAE). Al Sabkha is a small community between Al Rigga, Naif, Al Dhagaya and Al Buteen in the Deira region of eastern Dubai.

Al Sabkha, literally meaning marshland is bounded to the east by Al Sabkha Road (109th Street), to the east by 21st Street and to the north by route D 82 (Al Naif Road). One of the smallest communities in Dubai in terms of area, Al Sabkha is home to Arab and South Asian communities and has an active economic district with traditional souks. Murshid Bazaar in Al Sabkha is well known in the area for textiles and electronics. Deira's main abra station is located in the eastern section of Al Sabkha across route D 85 (Baniyas Road). It is also bordered to the east by D 87 (Al Sabkha Road).

A Dh. 34 million (US$ 9.2 million) parking garage with 470 parking spots was recently built in Al Sabkha by Dubai Municipality to address parking issues in the area. Al Sabkha is known for its bus station, banks and apartments. And even offices.
