= Al Ras, Dubai =

Area in Dubai, UAE

Al Ras Ar-Raʾs (ٱلرَّأْس)
- Community
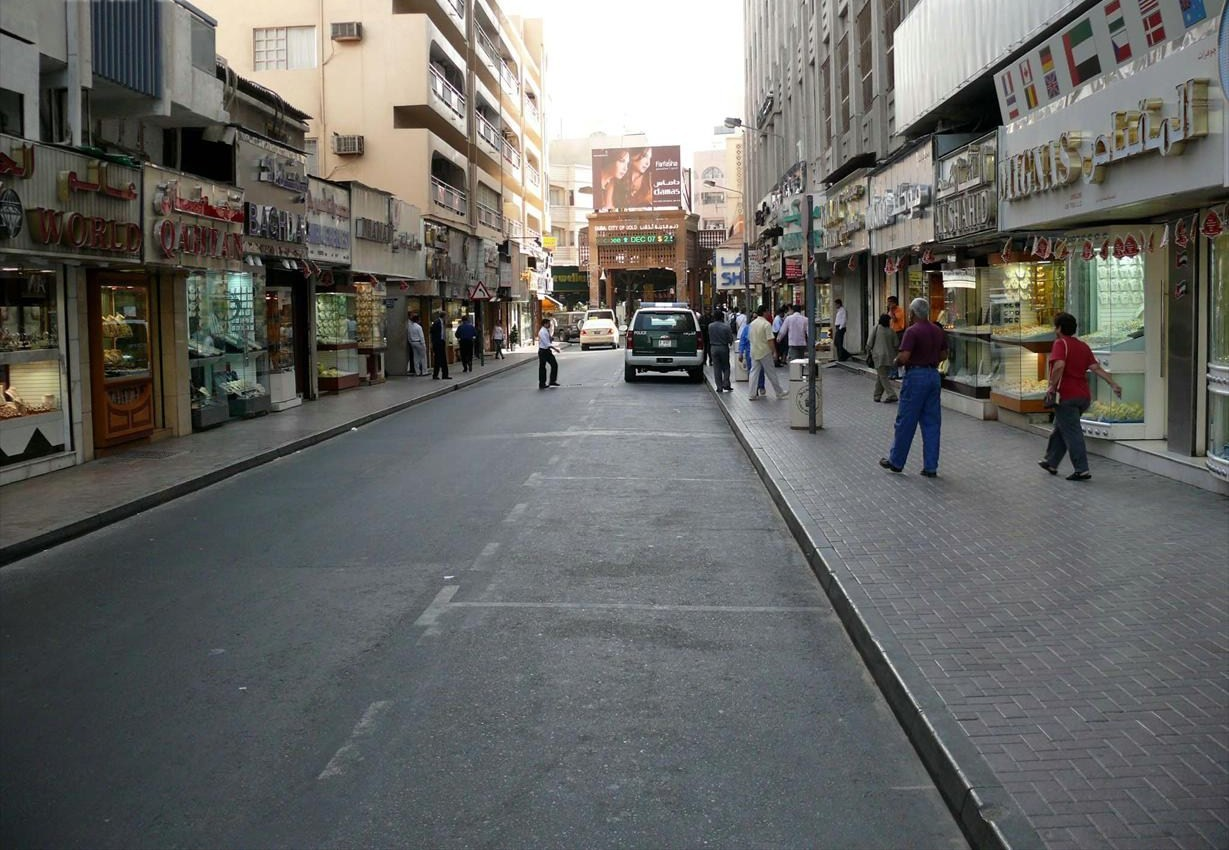
- The business district of Al Ras

- Location of Al Ras in the UAE Al Ras (United Arab Emirates) Al Ras (Persian Gulf) Al Ras (Middle East) Al Ras (West and Central Asia)
- Coordinates: 25°16′1.2″N 55°17′38.4″E
- Country: United Arab Emirates
- Emirate: Dubai
- City: Dubai

Area
  - Total: 0.20 km^{2} (0.077 sq mi)

Population (2000)
  - Total: 6,812
  - Density: 34,000/km^{2} (88,000/sq mi)
- Community number: 112

Al Ras (Arabic: ٱلرَّأْس, romanized: Ar-Raʾs, lit. 'The Cape') is a locality in Dubai, the United Arab Emirates. It is the westernmost locality in the area of Deira and borders the Dubai Creek to the west and south, and Al Dhagaya and Al Buteen to the east. Al Ras, literally meaning The Cape, is one of the oldest communities in Deira. It is bounded on the north, south and west by route D 85 (Al Baniyas Road) and to the east by Old Baladiya Street (110th Road).

== Description ==
Important landmarks in Al Ras include the Dubai Gold Souk, Dubai Spice Souk and Al Ras Public Library (aka Dubai Public Library), which is the oldest public library in Dubai. It was inaugurated by Sheikh Rashid bin Saeed Al Maktoum in 1963, but closed for renovations in 2019. Museums in the area include one dedicated to the Nabati poet Mubarak Okaili.

Al Ras metro station on the Green Line of the Dubai Metro serves the area.

An apartment fire in the area in April 2023 led to 16 fatalities.

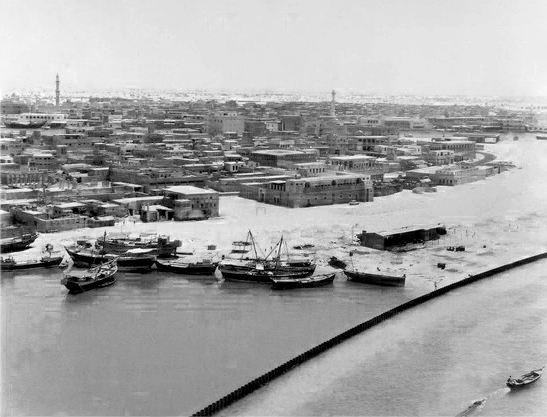
Al-Ras District in Deira and Dubai Creek in the mid-1960s

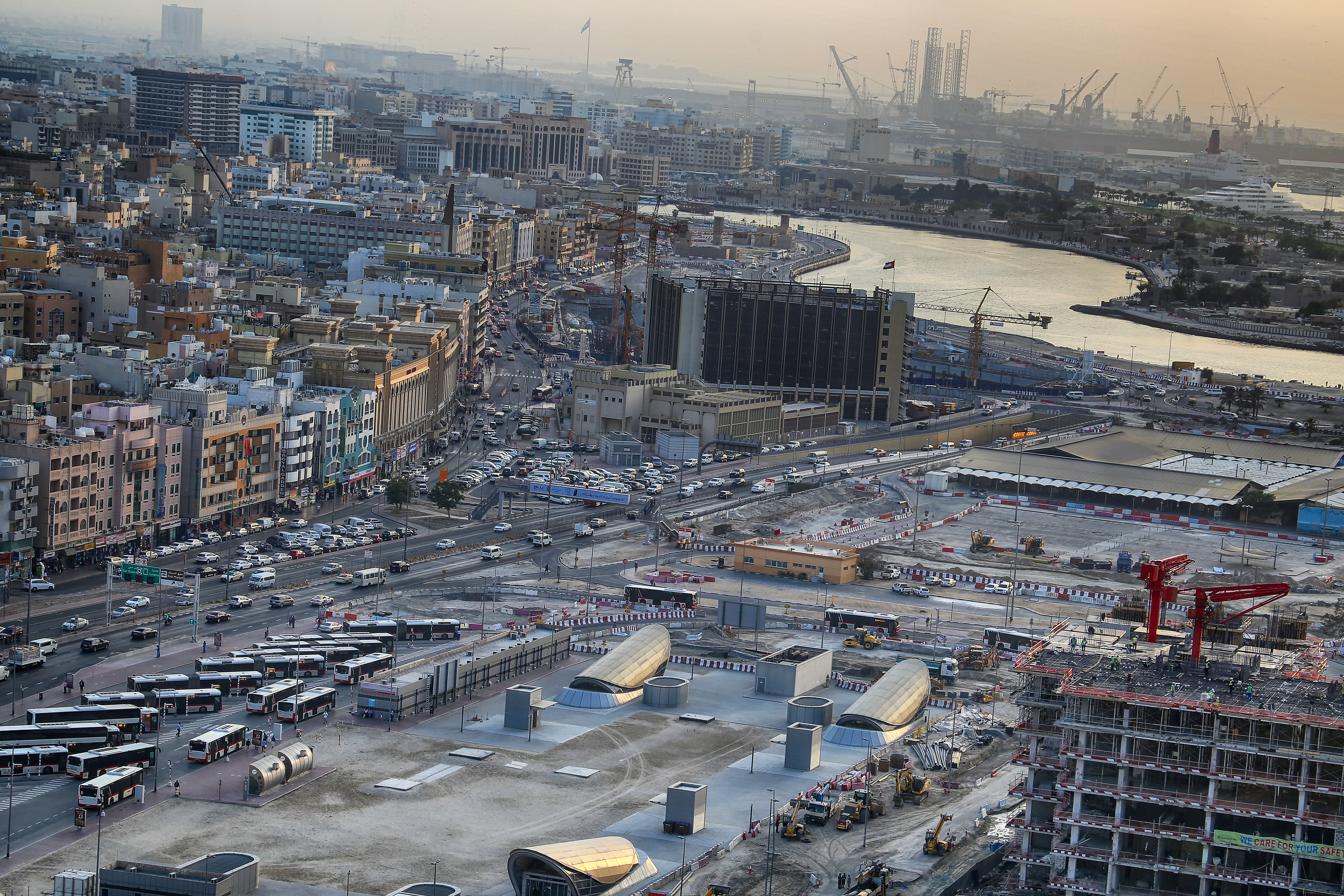
Al Ras in 2018

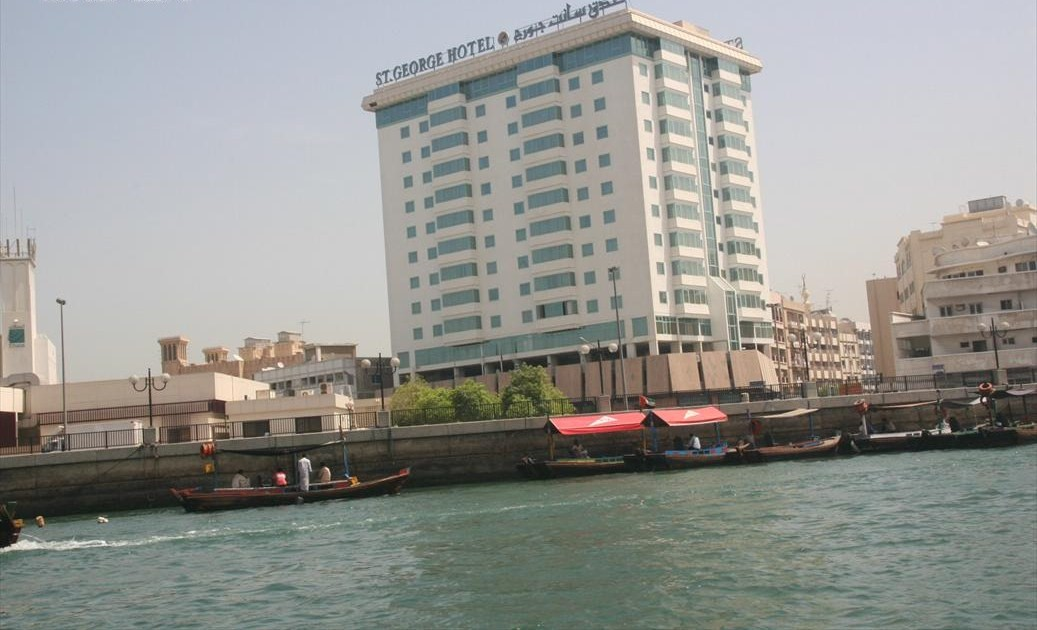
St. George Hotel in Al Ras, as seen from the Creek

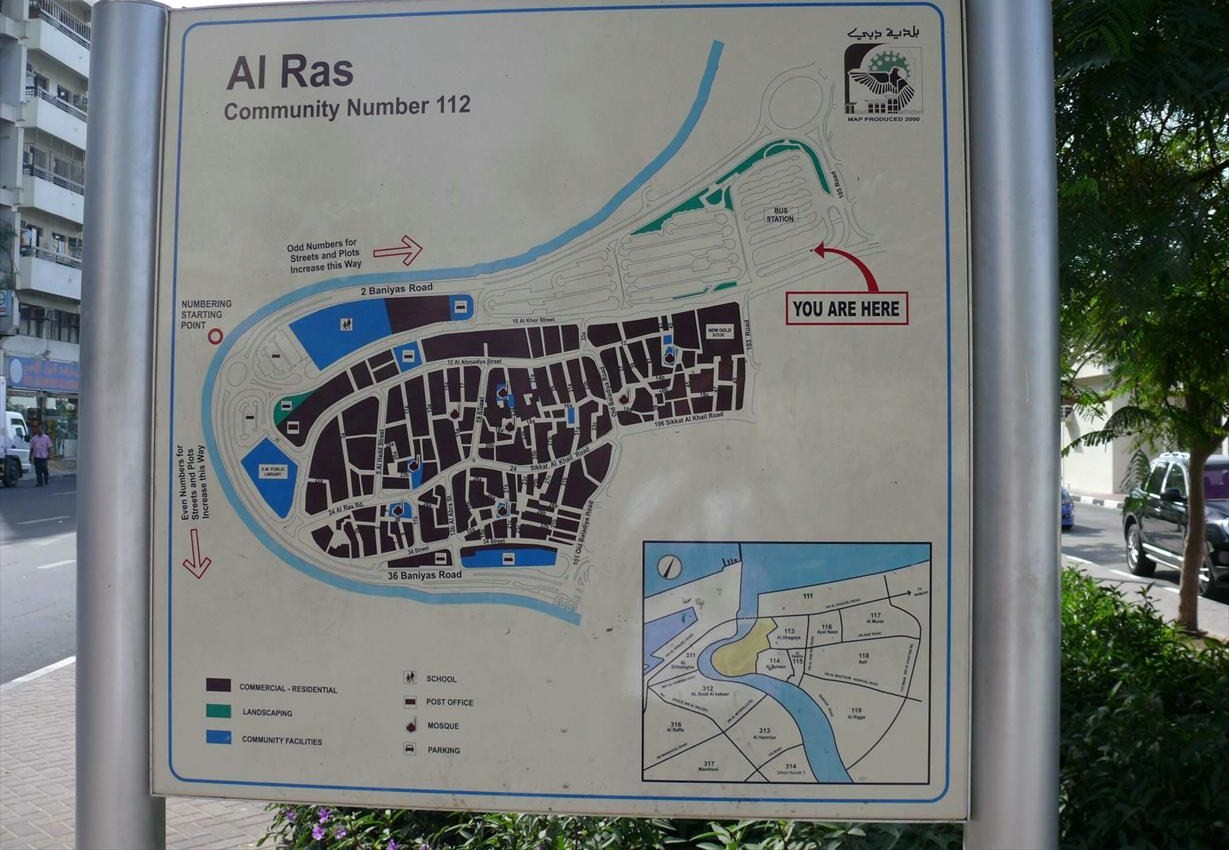
Community-level street map

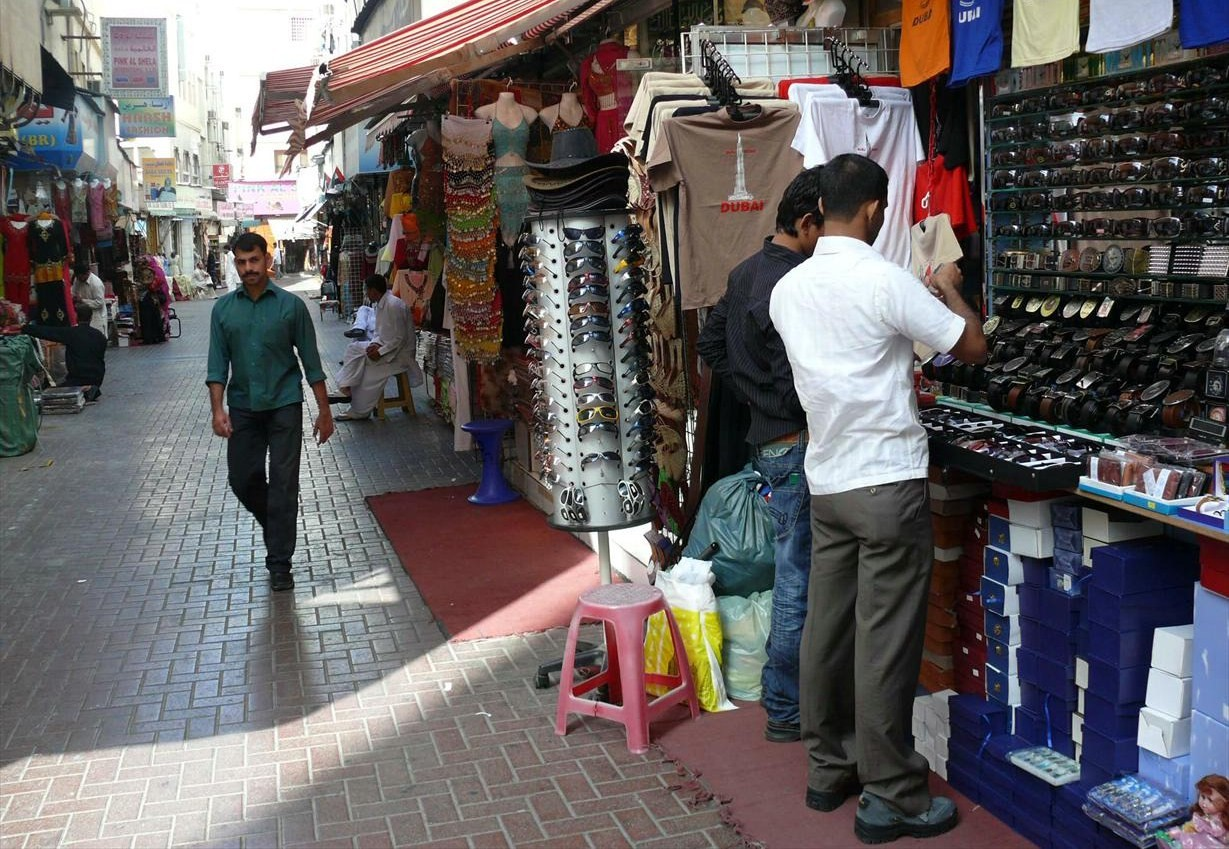
Business district in Al Ras
