= Saeed Al Maktoum House =

Building in the United Arab Emirates

Coordinates: 25.2680°N 55.2900°E

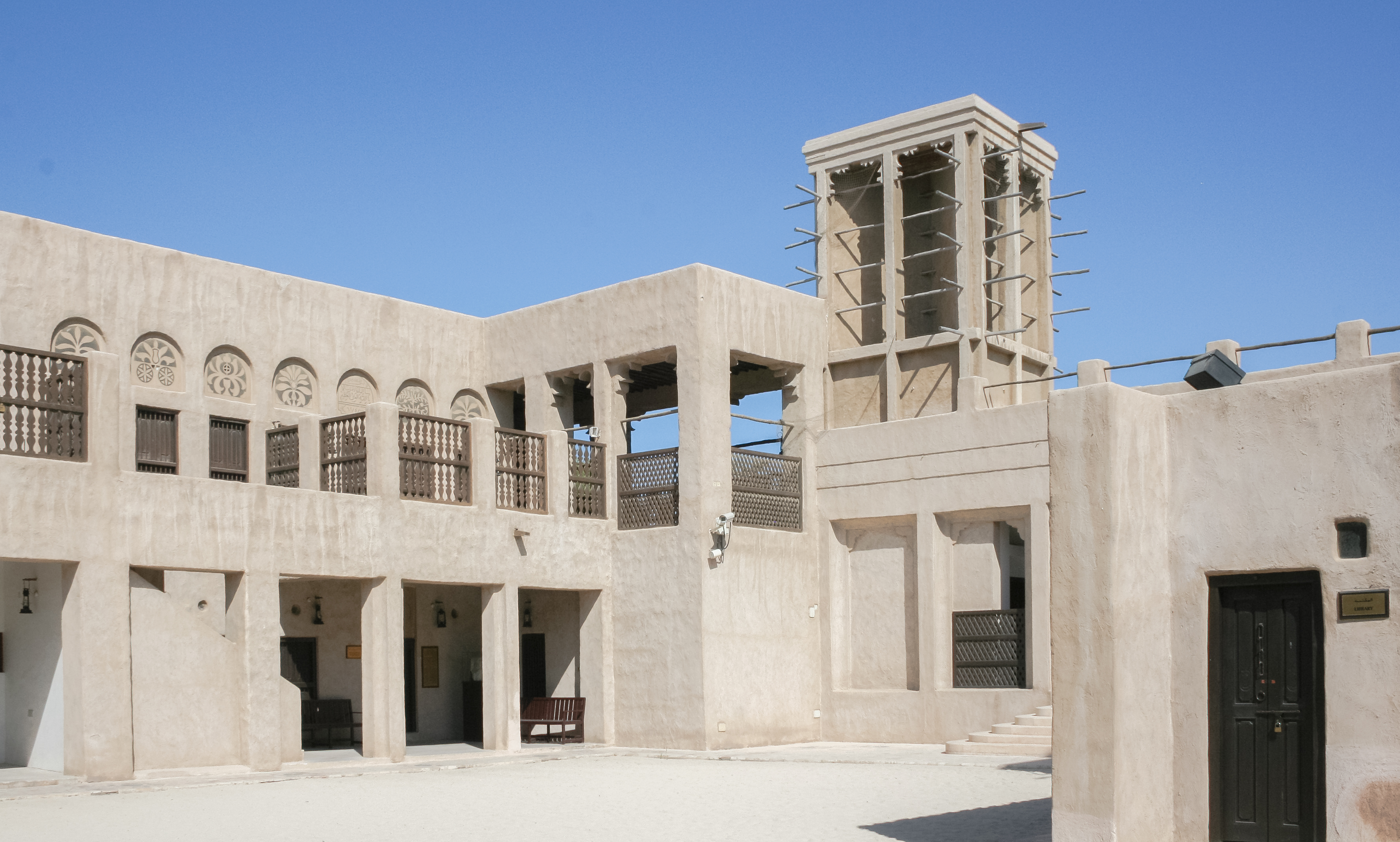
Sheikh Saeed Al Maktoum House with windtower in Al Shindagha.

Sheikh Saeed Al Maktoum House is a historic building and former residential quarters of Saeed bin Maktoum Al Maktoum, former ruler of Dubai in the United Arab Emirates.

The building is located along the Dubai Creek in the locality of Al Shindagha area. It was established around 1896 as the seat of the Al Maktoum family. The building is now a museum that contains artifacts and images of the old town of Dubai. The displays are distributed onto nine wings, as follows: The History of Saeed Al Maktoum House, Al Maktoum Family, Old Dubai, Marine Life, Views from Dubai, Social Life in Dubai, Coins and Stamps, Historic Documents and Maps. The total area of building is 3,600 square meters.

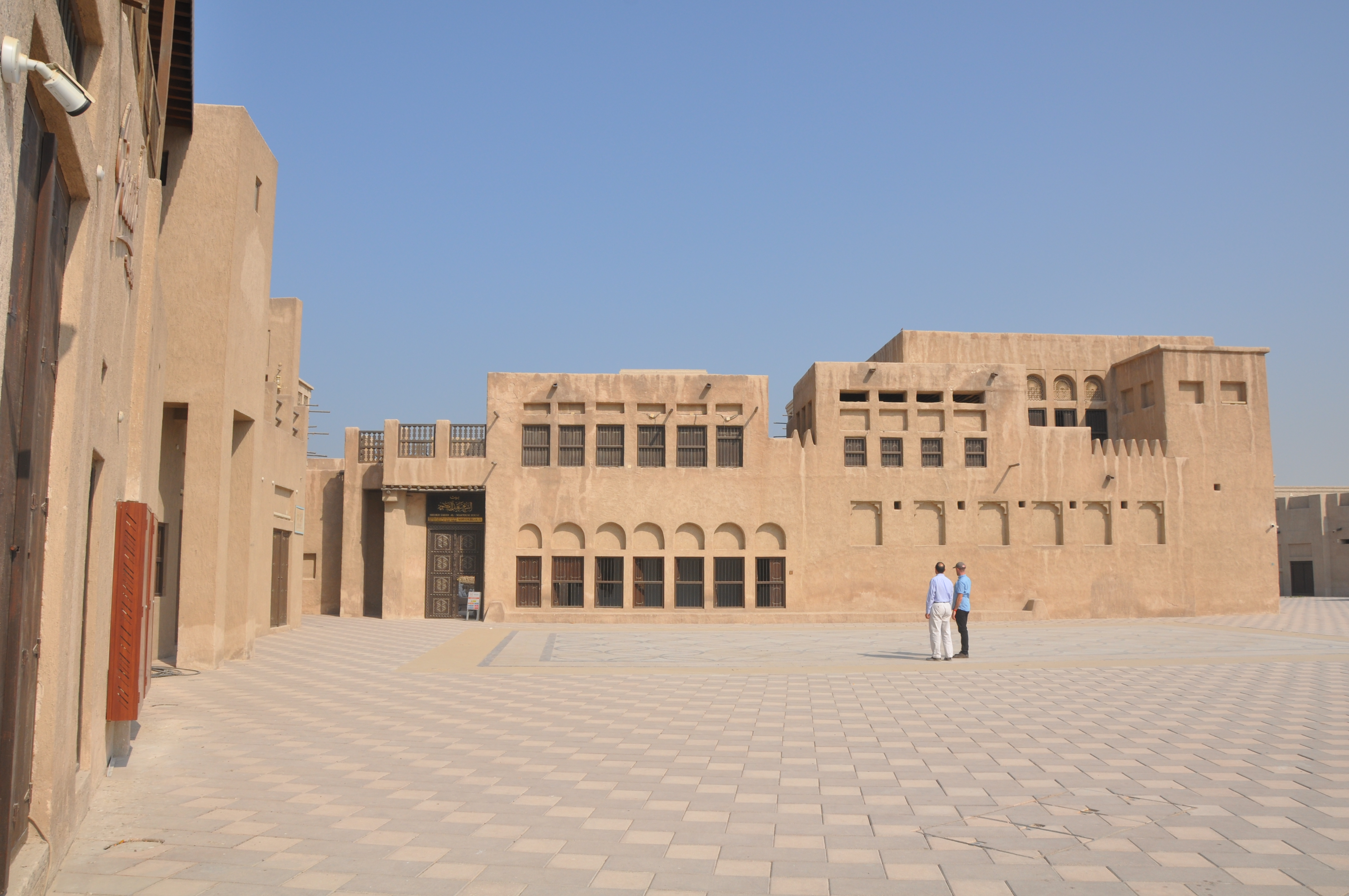
Saeed Al Maktoum House - photo with the area around

The building remain the residency of Sheikh Saeed Al Maktoum since his death in 1958. The site is also birthplace of his sons and grandsons.
