= Dubai Spice Souk =

Market in Dubai, United Arab Emirates

Dubai Spice Souk سوق التوابل
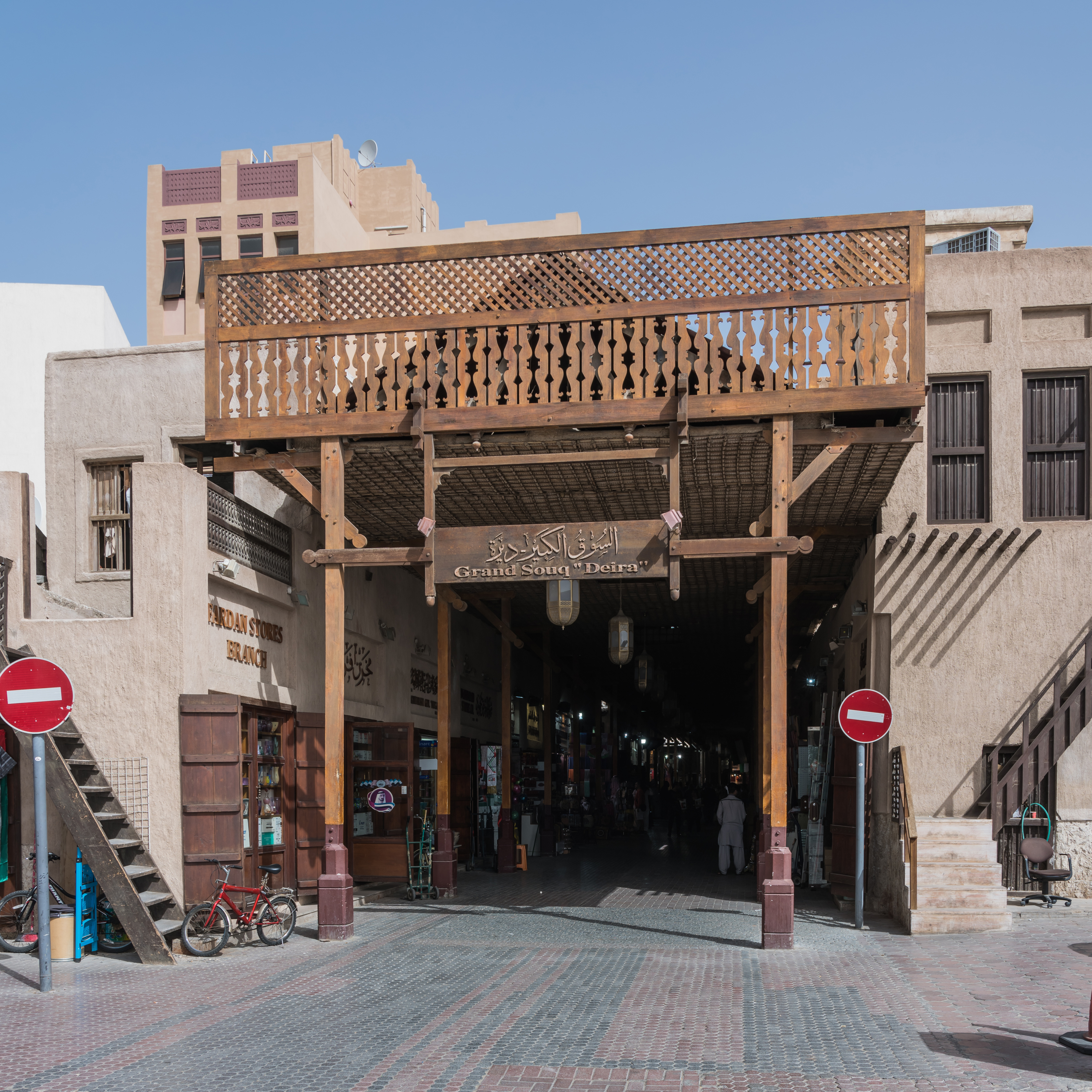
- Entrance to the souk
- Location: Baniyas Street, Al Ras, Dubai; Deira, Dubai, United Arab Emirates; 25.2675°N 55.2970°E
- Goods sold: Spices
- Interactive map of Dubai Spice Souk

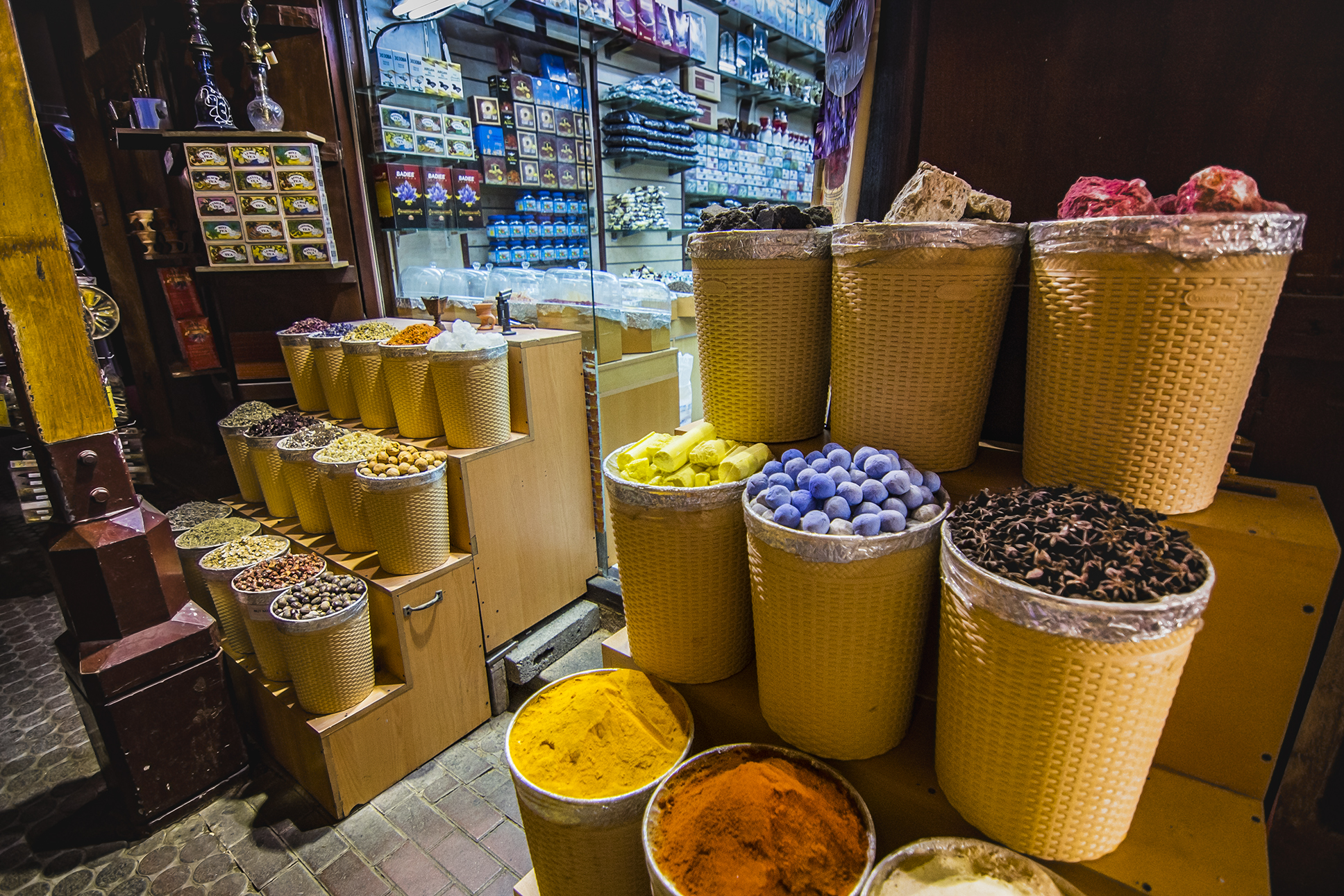
A store in the Spice Souk displaying a variety of spices, herbs and nuts

Dubai Spice Souk (Arabic: سوق التوابل) or the Old Souk is a traditional market (or souk) in Dubai, United Arab Emirates (UAE). The Spice Souk is located in Deira, in eastern Dubai, and is adjacent to the Dubai Gold Souk. The Spice Souk is in the locality of Al Ras, on Baniyas Street, near the Old Souk abra station on Dubai Creek. The souk comprises several narrow lanes which are lined with open and closed-roof stores, and is a tourist attraction.

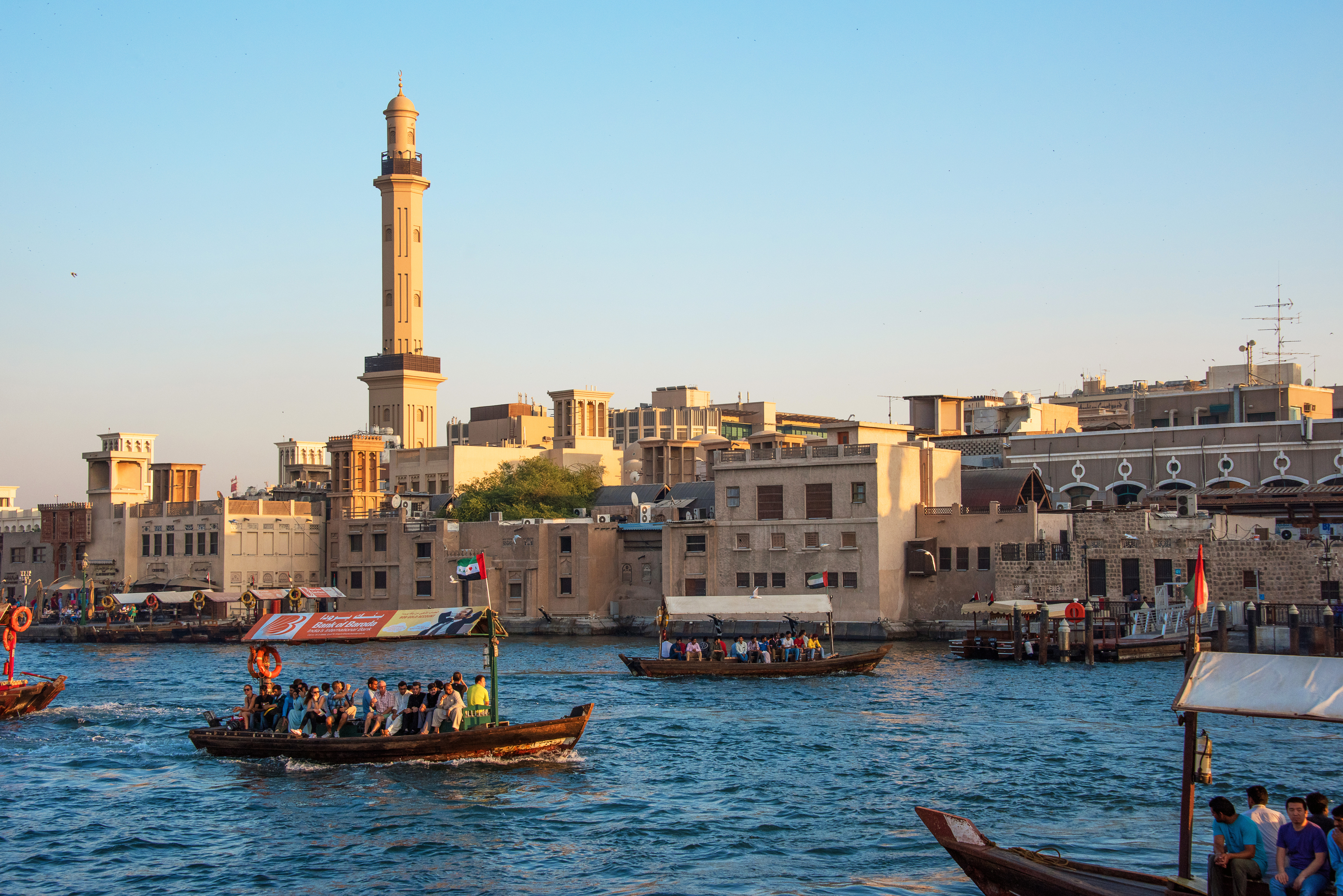
Dubai Creek with Dubai Spice Souk and Dubai Gold Souk in the background

Stores in the Spice Souk sell a variety of fragrances and spices from frankincense and shisha to the many herbs used in Arabic and South Asian food. In addition, several household, textiles, tea, incense, rugs and artifacts are also sold in the Spice Souk. A majority of the trading occurs through haggling. The quantity of trade, as well as the number of stores trading spices in the Spice Souk, have not increased in recent years due to the growth of larger stores and supermarkets.
