= Al Shindagha =

Al Shindagha الشندغة
- Community
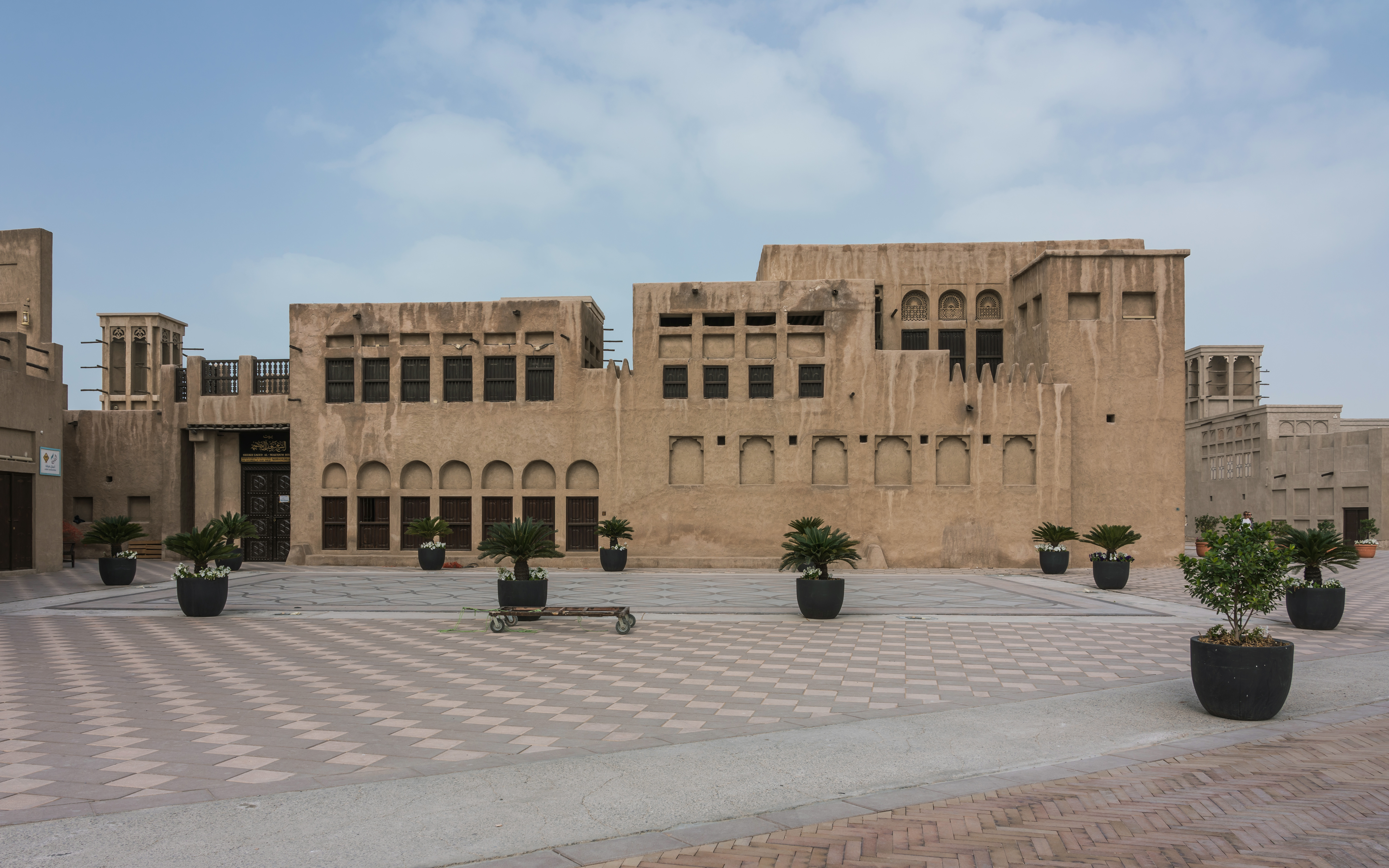
- The Saeed Al Maktoum House is an important historic landmark in Al Shindagha
- Interactive map of Al Shindagha
- Coordinates: 25.26802°N 55.29001°E
- Country: United Arab Emirates
- Emirate: Dubai
- City: Dubai
- Established: 1830s

Area
  - Total: 0.26 km^{2} (0.10 sq mi)

Population (2000)
  - Total: 16
  - Density: 62/km^{2} (160/sq mi)
- Community number: 311

Al Shindagha (Arabic: الشندغة), sometimes spelled Al Shindagah or Al Shindaga, is a neighbourhood in the traditional centre of the city of Dubai in the United Arab Emirates. It has undergone major restoration works, to revive the historic area and its buildings.

From 1912 to 1958, the then ruler of Dubai, Sheikh Saeed bin Maktoum, lived in the area. His reconstructed residence in Al Shindagha is now open to the public as a museum. It is bordered by the locality of Bur Dubai in the south, and by Port Rashid on the west. The Dubai Creek runs along the district's western periphery.

The Al Shindagha Tunnel serves as the northernmost connector between the localities of Bur Dubai and Deira.

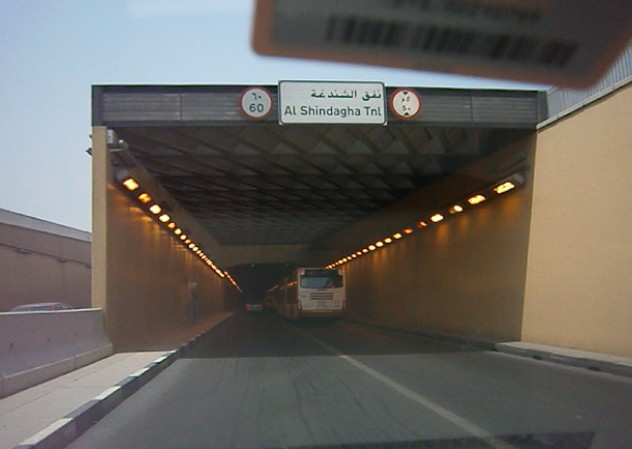
Al Shindagha tunnel

== See also ==
- Heritage Village Dubai
- Al Bastakiya Dubai: The Oldest Residential Area in Dubai
