= D 75 road (United Arab Emirates) =

Road in Dubai, United Arab Emirates

D 75
- د ٧٥
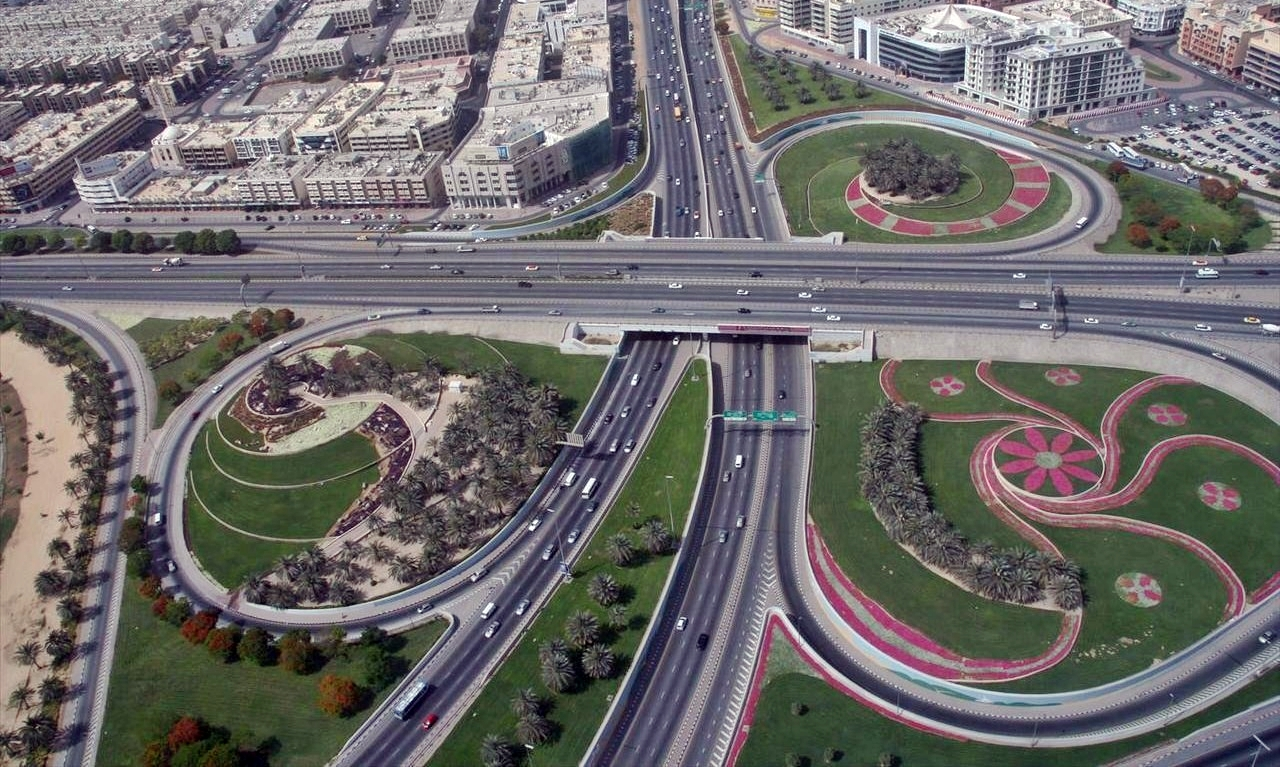
- Al Qutaeyat Road (right merging) with Zabeel Road near Zabeel

Route information
- Length: 3.0 km (1.9 mi)

Major junctions
- D 92 (Al Mina Road); D 90 (Al Mankool Road)

Location
- Country: United Arab Emirates
- Major cities: Dubai

Highway system
- Transport in the United Arab Emirates; Roads in Dubai

D 75 (Arabic: د ٧٥), also known as Sheikh Rashid Road or Al Qutaeyat Road, is a road in Dubai, United Arab Emirates. The road begins in Bur Dubai, running perpendicular to D 92 (Al Mina Road). D 75 proceeds south-eastward towards the localities of Al Mankhool, Al Karama and Al Jafilia. The road eventually merges with Umm Hurair Road at the Al Karama Interchange.

Important landmarks along the D 75 route include the consulate of Indonesia, Zabeel train station, Zabeel Park, Karama Shopping Centre and Karama Post Office.
