= Onyx Solar =

Spanish energy company

- Type: Private Company
- Founded: 1 January 2009; 17 years ago
- Founders: Alvaro Beltran, Teodosio del Caño Key
- Headquarters: Ávila, Province of Ávila, Spain
- Key people: Alvaro Beltran CEO, Diego Cuevas Vice President, Teodosio del Caño, CTO & COO
- Website: www.onyxsolar.com

Onyx Solar is a solar energy company in Ávila, Spain. It was established in 2009 by Alvaro Beltran and Teodosio del Caño. It manufactures Building-integrated photovoltaics (BIPV) and is known for its combination of energy preservation, optimization and photovoltaic energy production. The company is actively cooperating with several universities including Technical University of Madrid (UPM), Massachusetts Institute of Technology (MIT), and University of Barcelona.

== Research and development ==
Onyx Solar has been involved in solar energy research projects uncluding HERB, the retrofitting of residential buildings, in cooperation with the University of Nottingham and PVSITES, a project aimed to reduce market barriers for the large scale implementation of BIPV.

This company has also been involved with several solar energy research projects, any several of these projects have been in partnership with the European Commission. One example of an ongoing project with the European Commission is the ArtESun project, which seeks to bring new OPV (organic photovoltaic technologies) technologies to the thin-film PV market.

== Projects ==
Onyx Solar PV glass has been used in building projects on five continents, including in the construction of the Miami Heat Stadium, the Dubai Frame, the Science Pyramid in Colorado and an award-winning residential building known as The General in Northcote, Australia.

In March 2016, Onyx Solar signaled the completion of the installation of photovoltaic glass at the entrance of the American Airlines Arena by announcing that its project had received the LEED Gold certification, which is the highest certificate for building sustainability. This project utilized around 300 crystalline silicon PV glass units, which were deployed in 14 circular skylights. This implementation allows American Airlines Arena to produce 34,500 kWh of solar power per year for on-site consumption.

In June 2016, Apple announced that it will be fitting its retail stores in San Francisco with walkable solar glass floors for the purpose of generating electricity. The integration of solar power directly into its retail stores has been used as an example of Apple's focus on renewable technology. These walkways will be constructed with Thin-film solar cell technology.

Onyx Solar also documents all of its projects in its professional experience book. This book includes details about its involvement with the construction of the Dubai Frame and its work on the Tanjong Pagar building in Singapore (which will become the largest skyscraper in Singapore upon completion).

== Awards ==
On 30 June 2015 Glass Magazine named Onyx Solar 2015's "Most Innovative Glass Product" for its Low-E Photovoltaic Glass. The reasons behind this award include the ability of this product's layers to filter out 95% of ultraviolet radiation and 85% of infrared radiation as well as its solar heat coefficient (from 10 to 40%). Onyx Solar claims that passive properties of its Low-E Photovoltaic Glass are at least on par with the most advanced conventional low-emissive glass.

Several of the projects that Onyx Solar has participated in have also received awards. In 2014, the Novartis headquarters in the United States received the "Best Sustainable Project in New York" award from Engineering News-Record.
