= ADCB (Dubai Metro) =

Metro station in Dubai, UAE

ADCB بنك أبوظبي التجاري

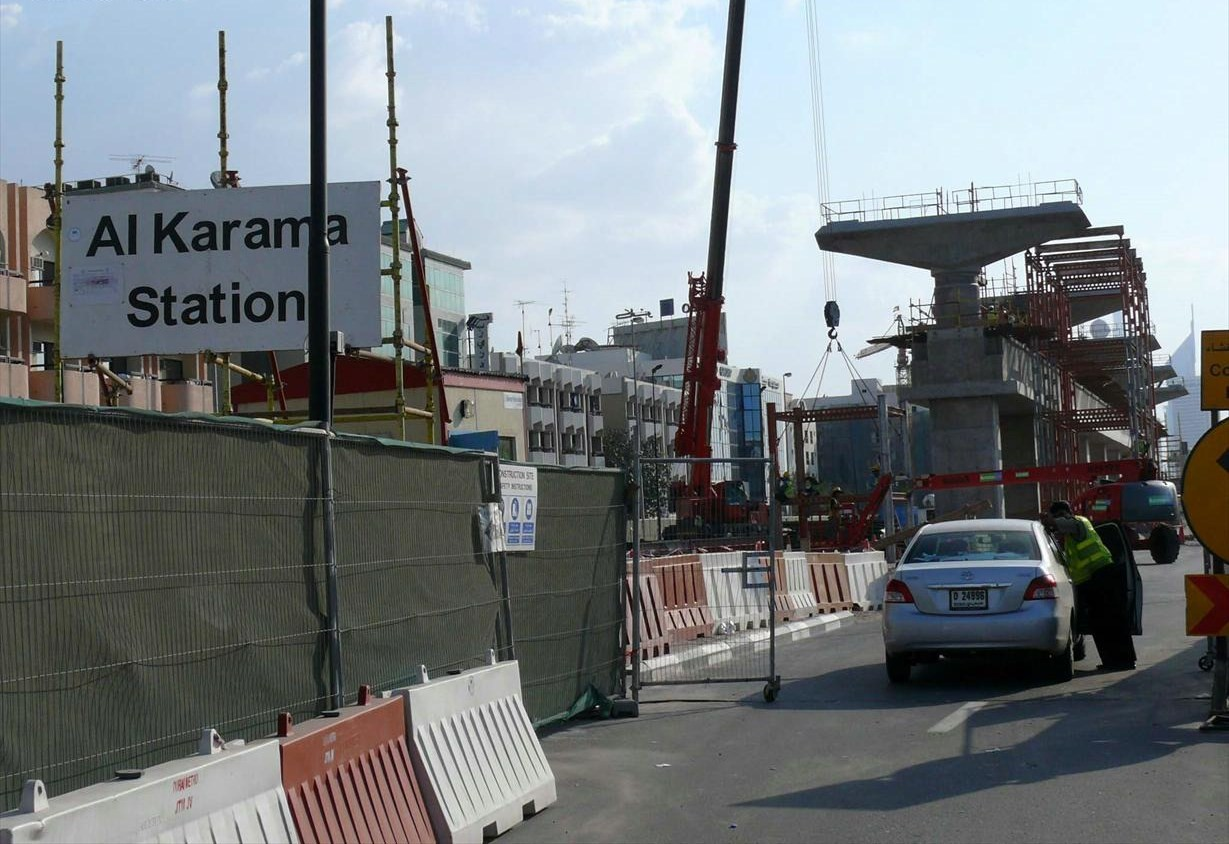
- Al Karama metro station under construction in 2008

General information
- Location: Sheikh Khalifa Bin Zayed Road & 33rd Street; Al Karama, Dubai; UAE
- Coordinates: 25.2445°N 55.2981°E
- System: Metro Station
- Operator: Dubai Metro
- Line: Red Line
- Platforms: 2
- Tracks: 2
- Connections: RTA Dubai: 21A Al Ghubaiba Bus Stn - Al Quoz Ind'l Area-4; 21B Al Quoz Ind'l Area-4 - Al Ghubaiba Bus Stn; 28 The Dubai Mall - Oud Metha Bus Stn; 29 Al Ghubaiba Bus Stn - The Dubai Mall; 61 Al Ghubaiba Bus Stn - Ras Al Khor Samari Residence; 88 Deira City Center Bus Stn - Dubai Internet City MS; C10 Hamriya Port, Control Tower - Mercato Shopping Mall; C26 Al Wasl Park - Qusais Ind'l Area; F12 Max MS - ADCB MS

Other information
- Station code: 20
- Fare zone: 6

History
- Opened: April 30, 2010
- Former names: Al Karama

Services
| Preceding station | Dubai Metro | Following station |
|---|---|---|
| Max towards Expo 2020 or Life Pharmacy | Red Line | BurJuman towards Centrepoint |
Location

ADCB (Arabic: بنك أبوظبي التجاري; formerly Al Karama) is a rapid transit station on the Red Line of the Dubai Metro in Dubai, UAE, serving the Al Karama district. The station is named after the Abu Dhabi Commercial Bank.

The station opened as part of the Red Line on 30 April 2010 and was renamed on 15 September 2014. It is close to Al Karama Bus Station, Al Attar Shopping Mall, Dubai Central Post Office, the Karama Centre, and the Karama Market. The station is also close to a number of bus routes.

== Platform layout ==
| G | Street level | Exit/Entrance |
| L1 | Concourse | Automatic Fare Collection gates, station agent, crossover |
| L2 | Side platform | Doors will open on the right |
| L2 | Platform 2 Southbound | Towards ← Life Pharmacy / Expo 2020; Next Station: Max |
| L2 | Platform 1 Northbound | Towards → Centrepoint; Next Station: BurJuman; Change at the next station for M2 |
| L2 | Side platform | Doors will open on the right |
