= Zabeel Park =

Urban public park, located in Dubai, United Arab Emirates

- حديقة زعبيل
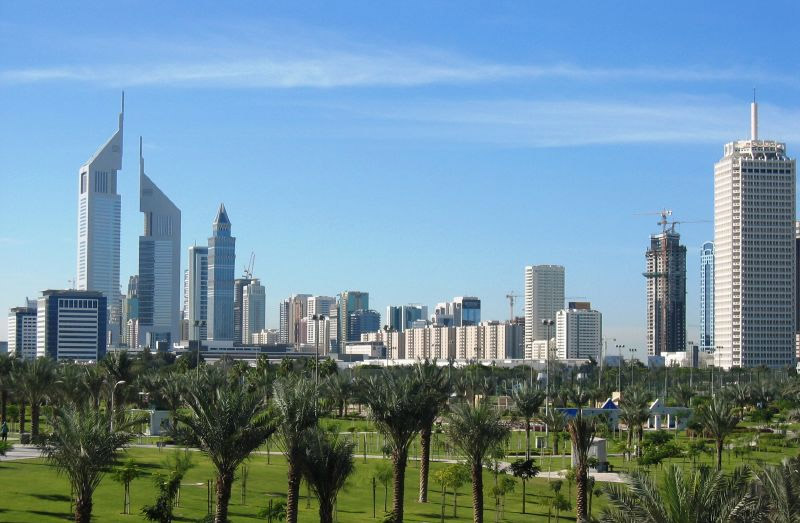
- View of Zabeel Park, with the Dubai skyline visible in the background
- Interactive map of Zabeel Park
- Type: Urban and public park
- Location: Dubai, United Arab Emirates
- Coordinates: 25°14′07.1″N 55°17′51.7″E
- Area: 47.5 ha (117.375 acres; 0.475 km^{2}; 0.183 mi^{2})
- Created: December 28, 2005; 20 years ago
- Operator: Public Parks and Horticulture Department (Dubai Municipality)
- Status: Open all year, Saturday to Wednesday: 8:00am to 11:00pm; Thursday and Friday: 8:00am to 11:30pm

Zabeel Park (Arabic: حديقة زعبيل) is an urban public park located in the Zabeel district of Dubai, United Arab Emirates. It is bounded by Sheikh Rashid Road to the north, the Sheikh Khalifa bin Zayed Road to the northwest, while the Sheikh Zayed Road cuts through the south. The park is divided into numerous sectors connected by pedestrian bridges, and there are multiple entrance gates. The Dubai Frame is located inside the park.

Situated between Al Karama and the Dubai World Trade Centre, Zabeel Park covers much of the Al Kifaf area. It is accessible from the Red Line of Dubai Metro via the nearby Al Jafiliya Station. It is maintained by the Public Parks and Horticulture Department of Dubai Municipality.

== Background ==
The park was opened to the public in December 2005, in an inauguration ceremony by Sheikh Hamdan bin Rashid Al Maktoum. The size of Zabeel Park is 47.5 ha (117.375 acres), or about 45 football fields. The parking capacity can accommodate 2,300 vehicles.

== Architecture ==
Zabeel Park was designed as one of the first technology-themed urban parks in the Persian Gulf region. Covering approximately 47 hectares, it is divided into several zones connected by pedestrian bridges. The layout features themed areas such as the Alternative Energy Zone, Communications Zone, and Techno Zone, which house interactive educational exhibits on topics like solar power and digital innovation. The park also includes jogging paths, water features, amphitheatres, sports facilities, and themed gardens, blending recreation with environmental education.

A prominent architectural landmark within the park is the Dubai Frame, a 150-meter-high rectangular structure that frames views of both old and modern Dubai. Clad in gold-coloured stainless steel, the Frame consists of two towers connected by a 93-meter glass skybridge, symbolizing the connection between the past and future of the city. Other structures, including an IMAX theatre, open-air amphitheatre, and children’s edutainment facilities, reflect the park’s technology-driven ethos.

Iranian architect Hooman Balazadeh, contributed a visionary concept for the park during the 2008 ThyssenKrupp Elevator International Architecture Award. He proposed a symbolic, interactive tower that integrated sustainable design and responded to the site’s context.

== Activities ==
The entrance fee is AED 5 per person. The park is one of the city's largest and most frequented, and is a popular spot for sports and live music. It contains various recreational facilities including a 2.5 km jogging track on the park perimeter, pedestrian tracks, BMX track, skateboarding park, barbecue and picnic areas, a boating lake, lakeside restaurants, ice skating, a mini cricket pitch and golfing area, shaded seating and children's play areas. There is also an exhibition gallery, prayer rooms, a fitness centre, and various monuments. The park has a technology-based theme, with three zones (the Alternative Energy Zone, Communications Zone and the Techno Zone) containing educational and interactive displays. It also offers a 3D cinema for edutainment activities.

There are over 3,000 palm tree plantations in the park, in addition to 7,000 other trees of a variety of 14 species. Visitors have access to Wi-Fi internet. During the 20th Dubai Shopping Festival in 2015, the park attracted over 90,000 visitors in the first 10 days.

== Photo gallery ==
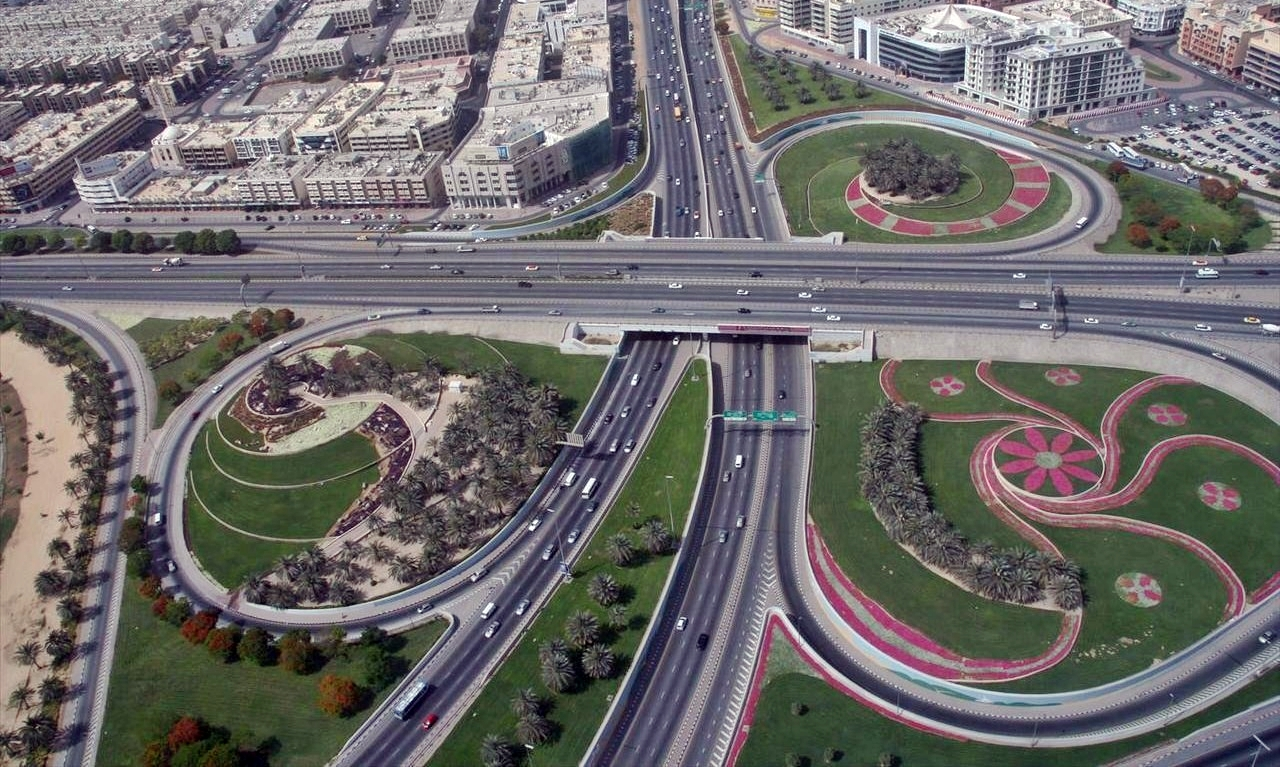
Aerial view of the interchange between Al Qutaeyat Road and Zabeel Road; Zabeel Park is on the left

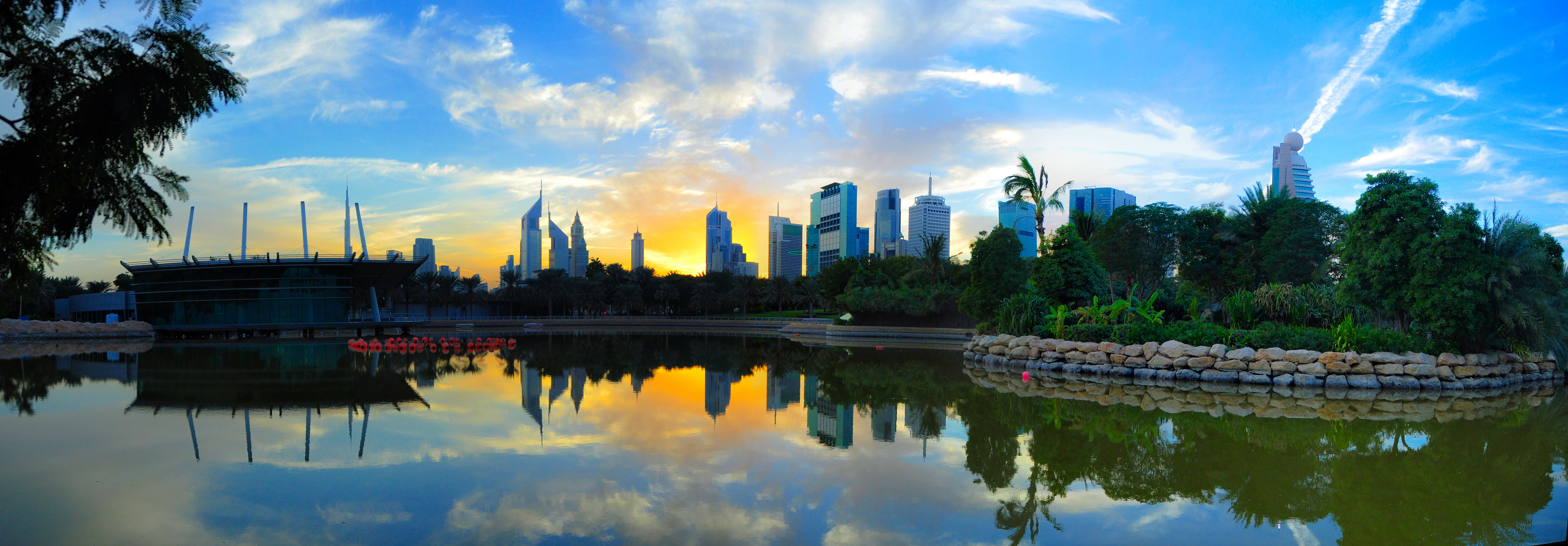
Dubai Skyline from Zabeel Park

== See also ==
- List of parks in Dubai
