= World Trade Centre (Dubai Metro) =

Metro station in Dubai, UAE

World Trade Centre المركز التجاري العالمي

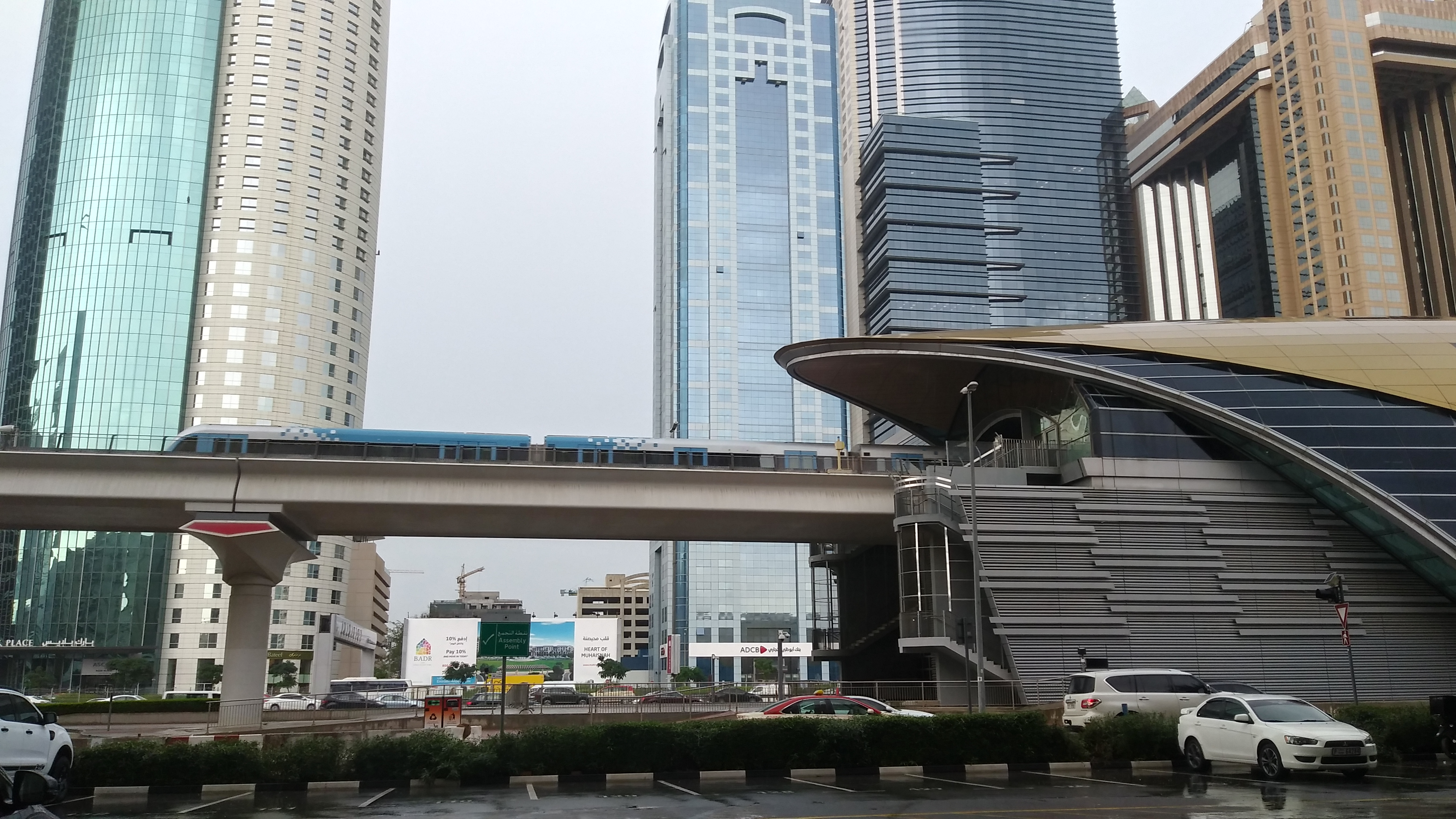
- World Trade Center metro station

General information
- Location: Dubai World Trade Centre; Trade Centre 2, Dubai; UAE
- Coordinates: 25.2248°N 55.2851°E
- System: Metro Station
- Operator: Dubai Metro
- Line: Red Line
- Platforms: 2
- Tracks: 2
- Connections: RTA Dubai: 21B Al Quoz Ind'l Area-4 - Al Ghubaiba Bus Stn; 98E Al Quoz Bus Stn - Al Satwa; F11 Financial Center MS - Al Satwa; F28 Emirates Tower MS - Satwa

Other information
- Station code: 22
- Fare zone: 6

History
- Opened: May 15, 2010

Services
Preceding station	Dubai Metro	Following station
Emirates Towers towards Expo 2020 or Life Pharmacy	Red Line	Max towards Centrepoint
Location

World Trade Centre (Arabic: المركز التجاري العالمي) is a rapid transit station on the Red Line of the Dubai Metro in Dubai, UAE, serving the area around the Dubai World Trade Centre (DWTC) building. The station is named after the World Trade Centre.

The station opened as part of the Red Line on 15 May 2010. It is close to the World Trade Centre and the API World Tower (aka Al Ali Tower). The station is also close to a number of bus routes.

== Station Layout ==
G	Street level	Exit/Entrance
L1	Concourse	Automatic Fare Collection gates, station agent, crossover
L2	Side platform | Doors will open on the right
L2	Platform 2 Southbound	Towards ← Life Pharmacy / Expo 2020; Next Station: Emirates Towers
L2	Platform 1 Northbound	Towards → Centrepoint; Next Station: Max
L2	Side platform | Doors will open on the right

== See also ==
- Dubai World Trade Centre building
