= Fernando Donis =

Mexican architect

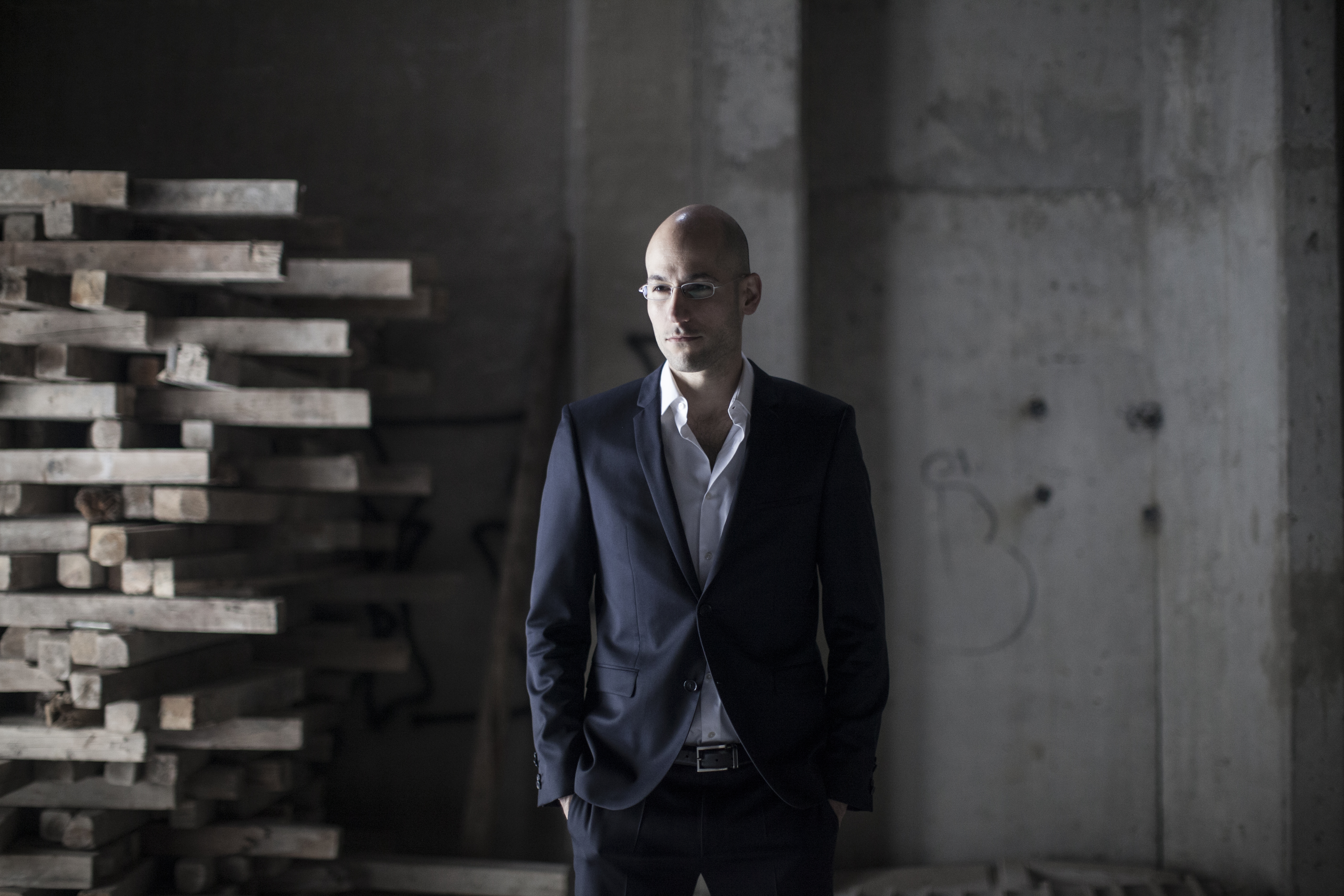

Fernando Donis is a Mexican architect established in the Netherlands, Mexico, and Dubai. He is the founder of DONIS, an international office of architecture 'framing' cities – theorizing and projecting them. Through research and projects DONIS participates in the unprecedented development of the cities of this century. Between 2000 and 2008, Donis was a close Associate of Rem Koolhaas at the Office for Metropolitan Architecture (OMA). Fernando Donis is the designer of the OMA 2002 CCTV Headquarters in Beijing. Founded in 2009, DONIS is currently developing and building several projects, and has also won international prizes such as the first prize for the ThyssenKrupp Architecture Award in 2009 among 926 proposals, with the Dubai Frame, under construction; the first prize for a competition for the National Palace of Justice in Paris; and the first prize for the design of an Olympic emblem for London 2012.

The new Jeddah International Airport in Saudi Arabia, the Porsche Design towers in Dubai, and the Dubai Renaissance tower are a few other projects that he was in charge of. Fernando has 2 kids Alexandra Donis (14) and Sofia Donis (12) and a wife called Daphne Schuit (42).

== Architecture ==
Donis is the designer of the CCTV Headquarters Tower in Beijing, the new Jeddah International Airport in Saudi Arabia, the Porsche Design towers in Dubai, and the Dubai Renaissance tower. There many other projects and master plans for which he was in charge.

The London Gate (2012) is the winning entry by Rotterdam studio Donis in a competition to design a temporary landmark for Aldgate, east London. The structure was commissioned to celebrate the London 2012 Olympic and Paralympic Games.

One of Donis's most notable works is the Dubai Frame. The Dubai Frame featured two parallel towers linked by an observation deck, a similar shape to the temporary landmark that had previously been designed for London. Donis has filed suit in US federal court against the Dubai Municipality and ThyssenKrupp Elevator, claiming he never received either a contract or compensation for his design.

In 2021, Donis was selected as the winner of a proposal project to create a new habitable topographies in which humans and nature can coexist. This project was called Dezeen's Redesign the World Competition powered by Twinmotion Donis' Frame City concept aims to undo the damage to nature and people's wellbeing that was caused by a century of rapid urbanization.

Each high-density city is designed to house a million people. It is formed of mountain-like terraced structures made from cross-laminated timber, which would be built to frame the natural landscapes. Roads and private vehicles would be abandoned in favor of pedestrian and cycling infrastructure. There has also been careful city planning to ensure that necessary services and amenities are within a 15-minute walk or cycle of people's homes.

== Achievements ==
Donis received his master's degree from the Architectural Association in London. He holds a PhD in architecture from the TU Delft in the Netherlands, with his thesis to be published in the upcoming book FRAME. He is a principal designer at OMA (Office for Metropolitan Architecture), exploring projects in the Middle East, Europe, and Mexico.

Donis was selected as one of the thirty most promising and influential people in Mexico in 2011 by CNN Expansion. In 2015 he was selected by the Foreign Relations Department of Mexico as one of the most creative Mexicans abroad. In 2021, Donis was selected as the winner of a proposal project to create a new habitable topographies in which humans and nature can coexist. This project was called Dezeen's Redesign the World Competition powered by Twinmotion
