= Max (Dubai Metro) =

Station on the Dubai Metro

Max ماكس

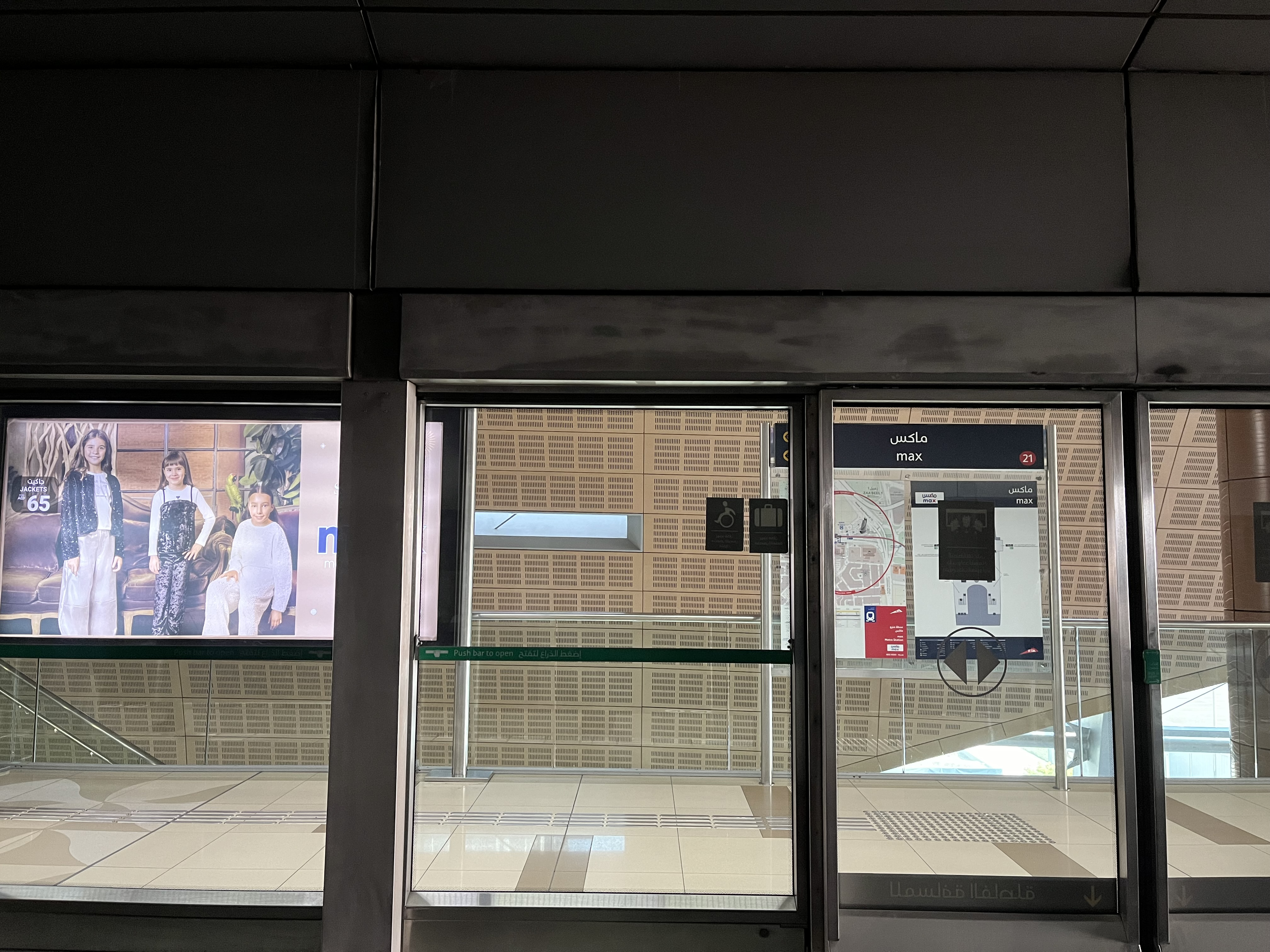

General information
- Location: Sheikh Khalifa Bin Zayed Road; Al Kifaf, Dubai; UAE
- Coordinates: 25.2336°N 55.2921°E
- System: Metro Station
- Line: Red Line
- Platforms: 2 side platforms
- Tracks: 2
- Connections: RTA Dubai: 10 Gold Souq Bus Stn – Al Quoz Bus Stn; 21B Al Quoz Ind'l Area-4 – Al Ghubaiba Bus Stn; 27 Gold Souq Bus Stn – The Dubai Mall; 29 Al Ghubaiba Bus Stn – The Dubai Mall; 32C Al Qusais Bus Stn – Al Jafiliya Bus Stn; 61 Al Ghubaiba Bus Stn – Ras Al Khor Samari Residence; 83 Al Ghubaiba Bus Stn – Al Fardan Exchange MS; 88 Deira City Center Bus Stn – Dubai Internet City MS; C26 Al Wasl Park – Qusais Ind'l Area; E102 Al Jafiliya Bus Stn – Zayed Intl Airport Terminal A, Abu Dhabi; F09 Al Jafiliya Bus Stn (Dubai Frame) – Al Wasl Park; F12 Max MS – ADCB MS; X28 Lulu Village – Agora Mall; X92 Al Ghubaiba Bus Stn – Parco Hypermarket

Construction
- Accessible: yes

Other information
- Station code: 21
- Fare zone: 6

History
- Opened: September 9, 2009
- Former names: Al Jafilia

Services
Preceding station	Dubai Metro	Following station
World Trade Centre towards Expo 2020 or Life Pharmacy	Red Line	ADCB towards Centrepoint
Location

Max (Arabic: ماكس) is a rapid transit station on the Red Line of the Dubai Metro in Dubai, UAE.

The station serves Al Jafilia and surrounding areas. It is located on the Sheikh Khalifa Bin Zayed Road, providing access to Zabeel Park and several office buildings.

On 4 August 2021 this station was renamed from "Al Jafilia" to "Max" after the Max Fashion brand.

== Station Layout ==
G	Street level	Exit/Entrance
L1	Concourse	Automatic Fare Collection gates, station agent, crossover
L2	Side platform | Doors will open on the right
L2	Platform 2 Southbound	Towards ← Life Pharmacy / Expo 2020; Next Station: World Trade Centre
L2	Platform 1 Northbound	Towards → Centrepoint; Next Station: ADCB
L2	Side platform | Doors will open on the right
