= Dubai Frame =

Architectural landmark in Dubai

Coordinates: 25°14′08″N 55°18′01″E

- برواز دبي

- Former names: Al Berwaz Tower

General information
- Status: Completed
- Location: Zabeel Park, Dubai, United Arab Emirates
- Construction started: 2013
- Completed: 1 January 2018
- Opened: 1 January 2018
- Cost: AED 230 million

Height
- Architectural: 150 m (492 ft)
- Roof: 150 m (492 ft)

Design and construction
- Architects: Hyder Consulting, Arcadis
- Developer: Dubai Municipality

The Dubai Frame (Arabic: برواز دبي) is an observatory, museum and monument in Zabeel Park, Dubai. It holds the record for the largest frame in the world. The building has a height of 150.24 meters and a width of 95.53 meters. The building mainly serves as an observatory, providing views of old Dubai in the north and newer parts in the south.

The project idea was initially conceived by Fernando Donis through an architecture competition by ThyssenKrupp and Dubai Municipality, and selected as the winner of a design competition by an international jury. Donis has alleged that he had his intellectual property stolen and was denied credit for the design. The final project was completed by Hyder Consulting, part of Arcadis NV. It opened in January 2018. The Dubai Frame can take only 200 visitors per hour. Only groups of 20 will be sent to each of the augmented-reality stops – the Mezzanine level, the Sky Deck level and the Vortex Level.

== Architecture competition ==
The design was selected as the winner of the 2009 ThyssenKrupp Elevator International Award from 926 proposals. Participants from all over the world were invited to submit an emblem that would promote “The new face for Dubai". It is near the Star Gate of Zabeel Park and stands at 150.24 m (493 ft) tall and 95.53 m (313 ft) wide.

The ThyssenKrupp Elevator Architecture Award is an international architecture competition first held in 1988 and sponsored by one of the world's leading elevator companies. An international panel of judges selected the winning idea from among 926 design proposals to create a Tall Emblem Structure for Dubai. The original jury consisted of 11 international architects — a former and current chairman of the International Union of Architects (UIA) and the regional chairman of ThyssenKrupp Elevator. Dubai Municipality’s director general and Sheikh Hamdan Bin Rashid Al Maktoum were listed as ‘honorary’ jurors.

Donis' design was ultimately selected, for which he won an AED 367,329.70 ($100,000) prize. According to Donis, when designing the structure he saw Dubai as a city full of emblems and rather than adding another one, they proposed to frame them all: to frame the city. Instead of building a massive structure, the purpose of the proposal was to build a void of 150 meters by 105 meters to continuously frame the development of the past, current, and future Dubai. The design aims to become the structure that celebrates yet constrains the city.

== Design ==
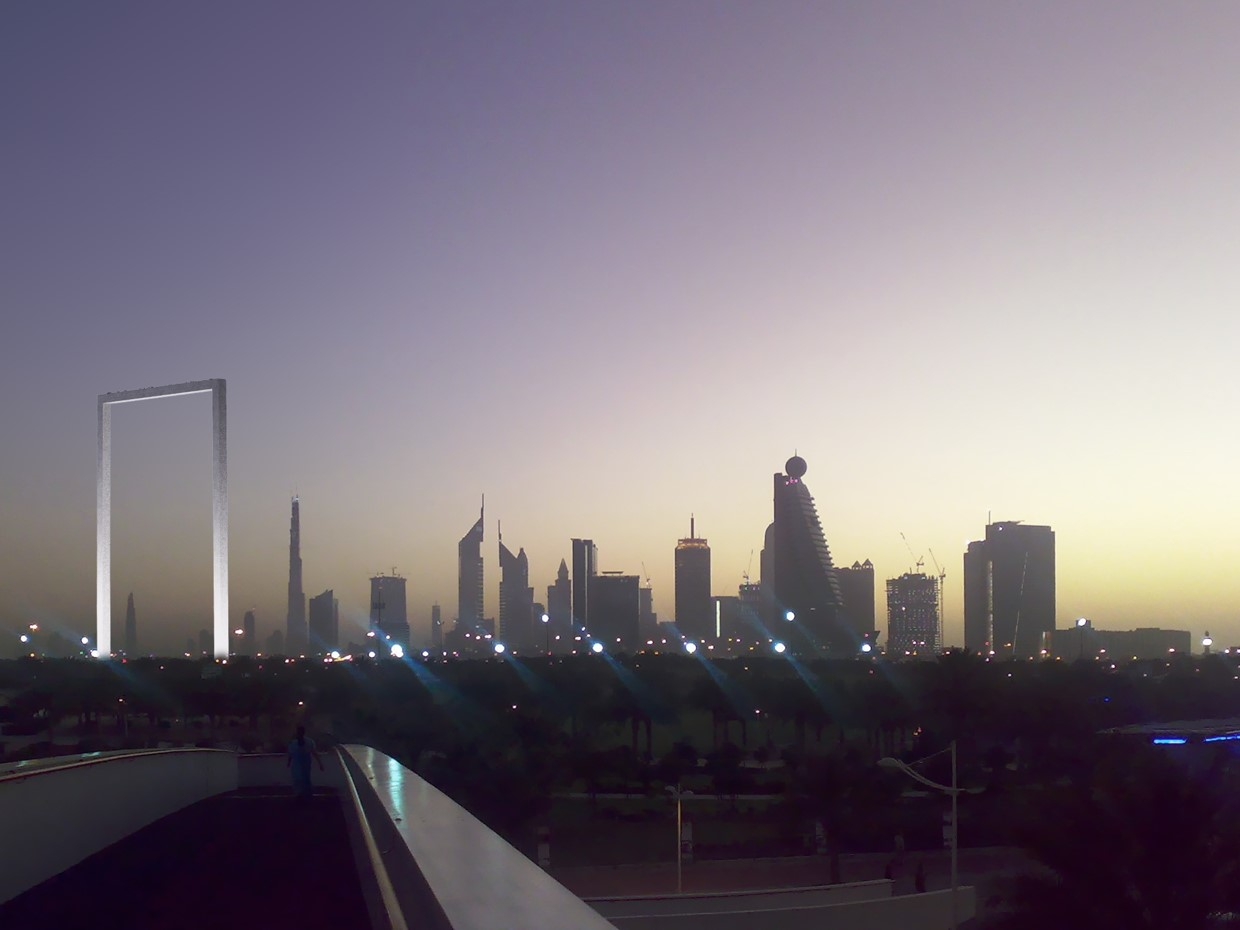
Digital render of Dubai Frame as Al Berwaz Tower in 2007

The Dubai Frame is created out of glass, steel, aluminum, and reinforced concrete with designs of the logo of Expo 2020 embedded on the outer facade. The Dubai Frame uses the golden rectangle with the side ratios of 1:1.618. It is positioned in such a way that representative landmarks of modern Dubai can be seen on one side, while from the other side, visitors can also view older parts of the city. An observation deck spans the top of the frame, with glass-bottomed floors looking down almost 150 meters onto the building's lower span. This space serves as a symbolic bridge between past and present with the two towers connected by the glass bottomed top of the frame. The lower span contains a museum showing the history of the city, and a video exhibit predicting the city's future. It shows the elements of the Emirati traditions and heritage and how the city has rapidly transformed from a humble fishing village to one of the most luxurious and urban destinations in the world. Using special effects, the museum creates a visually-compelling experience taking you from the nomadic fishing and pearl diving village of the past up to a projection of 50 years into the future. The elevator of frame to the Sky Deck carries visitors up 48 floors in 75 seconds.

Dubai Frame was formerly known as "Al Berwaz Tower" The project is a complete glass, transparent structure resembling a huge window frame intended to highlight the attractions of the city and has a view of the skyscrapers on Shaikh Zayed Road from one side — displaying modern Dubai — while the other side of the frame will show the old Dubai landmarks of Deira, Umm Hurair and Karama.

== Intellectual property controversy ==
Five years after Fernando Donis won the competition, Dubai Municipality released images of a redesigned Dubai Frame, which aside from its shape had little resemblance to the original design that was designed by Donis. According to Donis, he was offered a contract by Dubai Municipality, but one of the clauses stated that he waive his intellectual rights to the project and that he would not be able to use the completed design to promote his own practice. He said that clause was a direct breach of an earlier clause in the original competition brief which stipulated that the author will keep his copyright of his work. Donis refused to sign the clause, hence Dubai Municipality hired Hyder Consulting, a branch of Arcadis, to build and redesign the project. Thyssen Krupp described the controversy as “a commercial disagreement” and stated the company “does not have any possibility to interfere”. According to Dubai Municipality, the current Dubai Frame is very different from the one Donis made and Donis didn't have the proper licenses to work on the project.

In December 2016, Donis filed a lawsuit in the United States federal court against the Municipality of Dubai and ThyssenKrupp Elevator. In his lawsuit, Donis claims that he has not received either a contract or compensation for his design, despite it being currently under construction. In 2018, it was reported that Donis and the Municipality of Dubai were engaged in a legal dispute over ownership of the copyright for the building. New York-based lawyer Edward Klaris represented Donis in the United States federal court against the Dubai Municipality and ThyssenKrupp Elevator, but the case did not reach any conclusion.

== Gallery ==
Dubai Frame in Dubai, United Arab Emirates

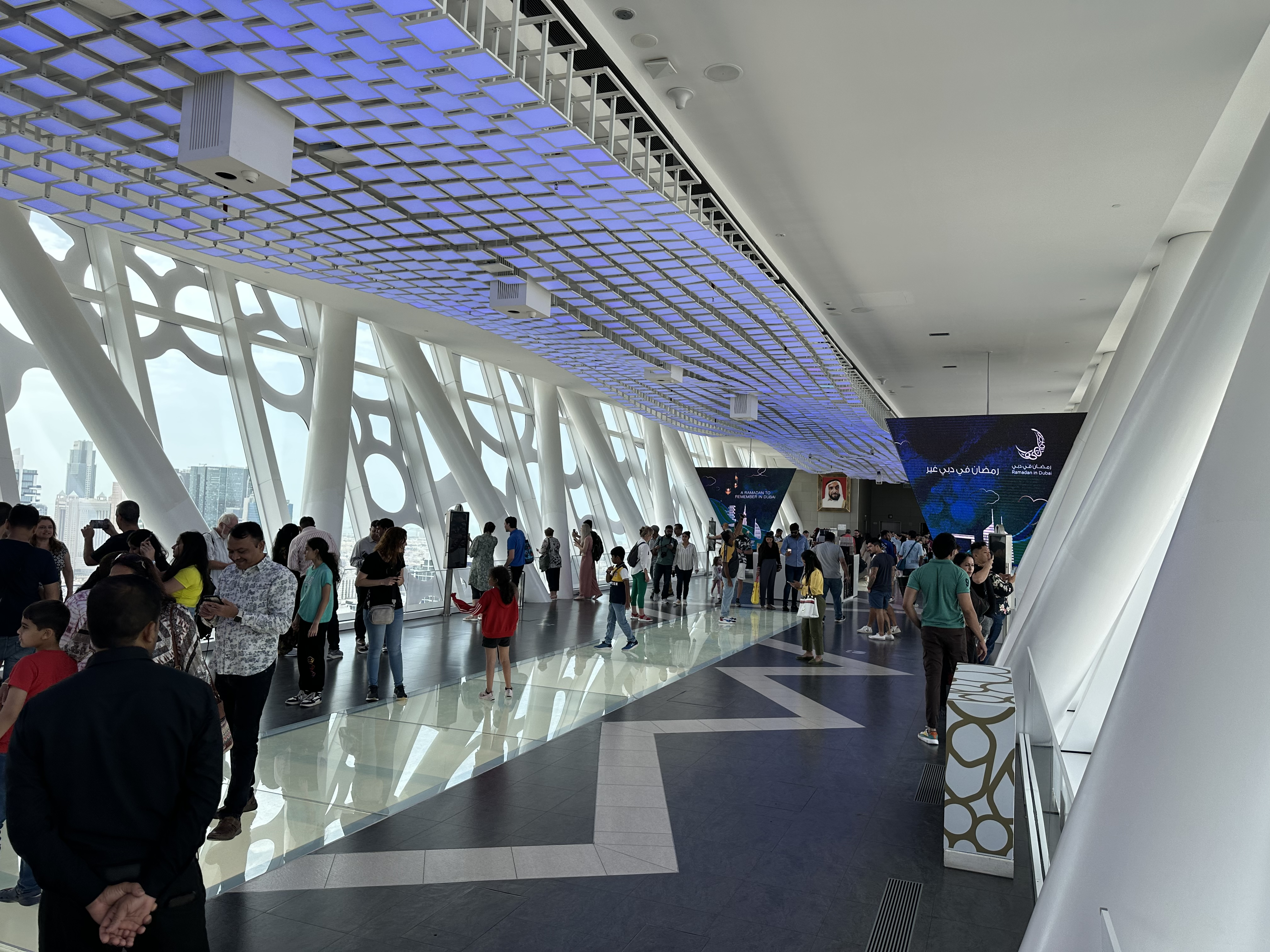
The Dubai Frame Observation Deck in Dubai, United Arab Emirates.

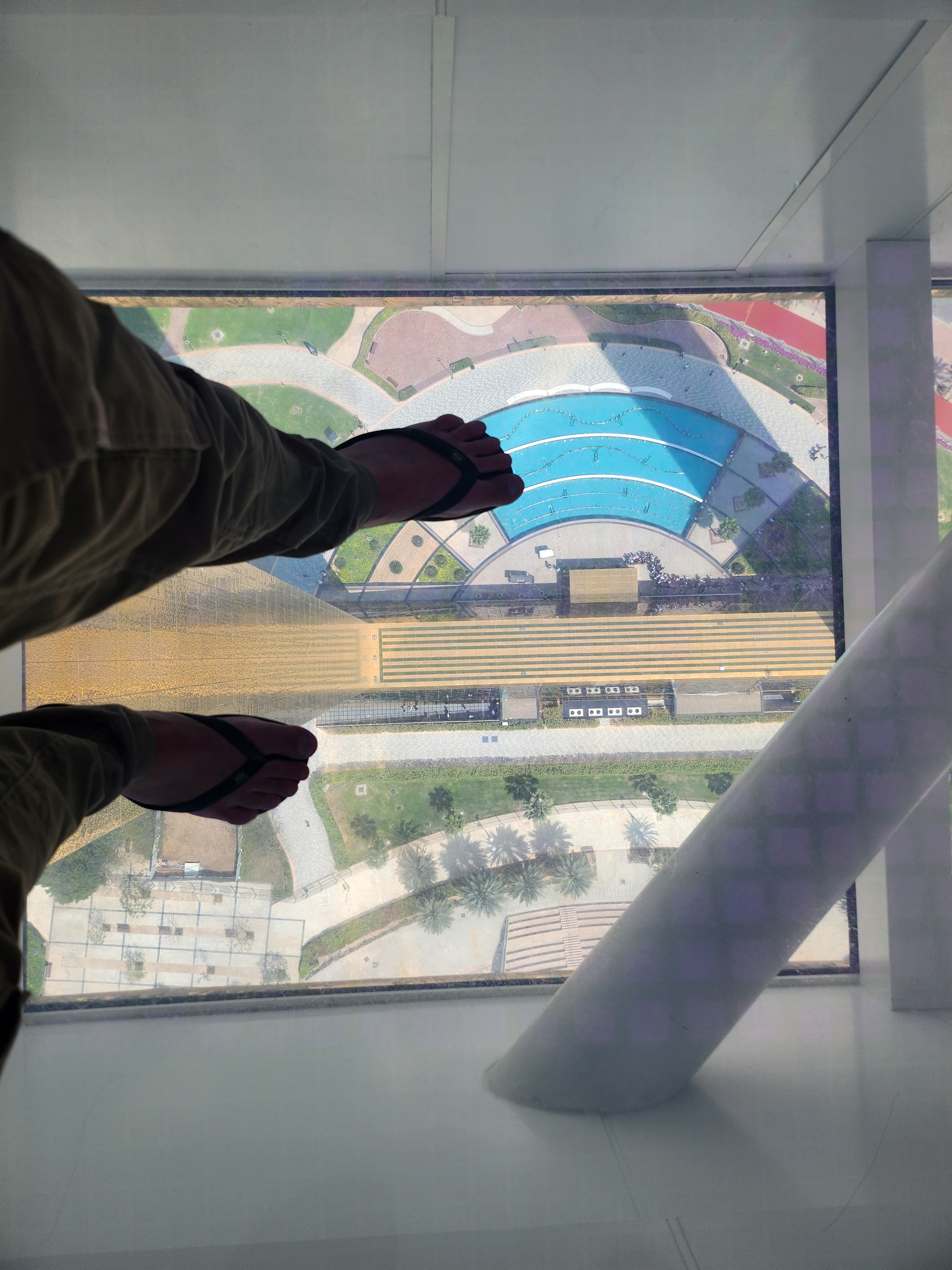
Transparent Glass Floor of the Dubai Frame

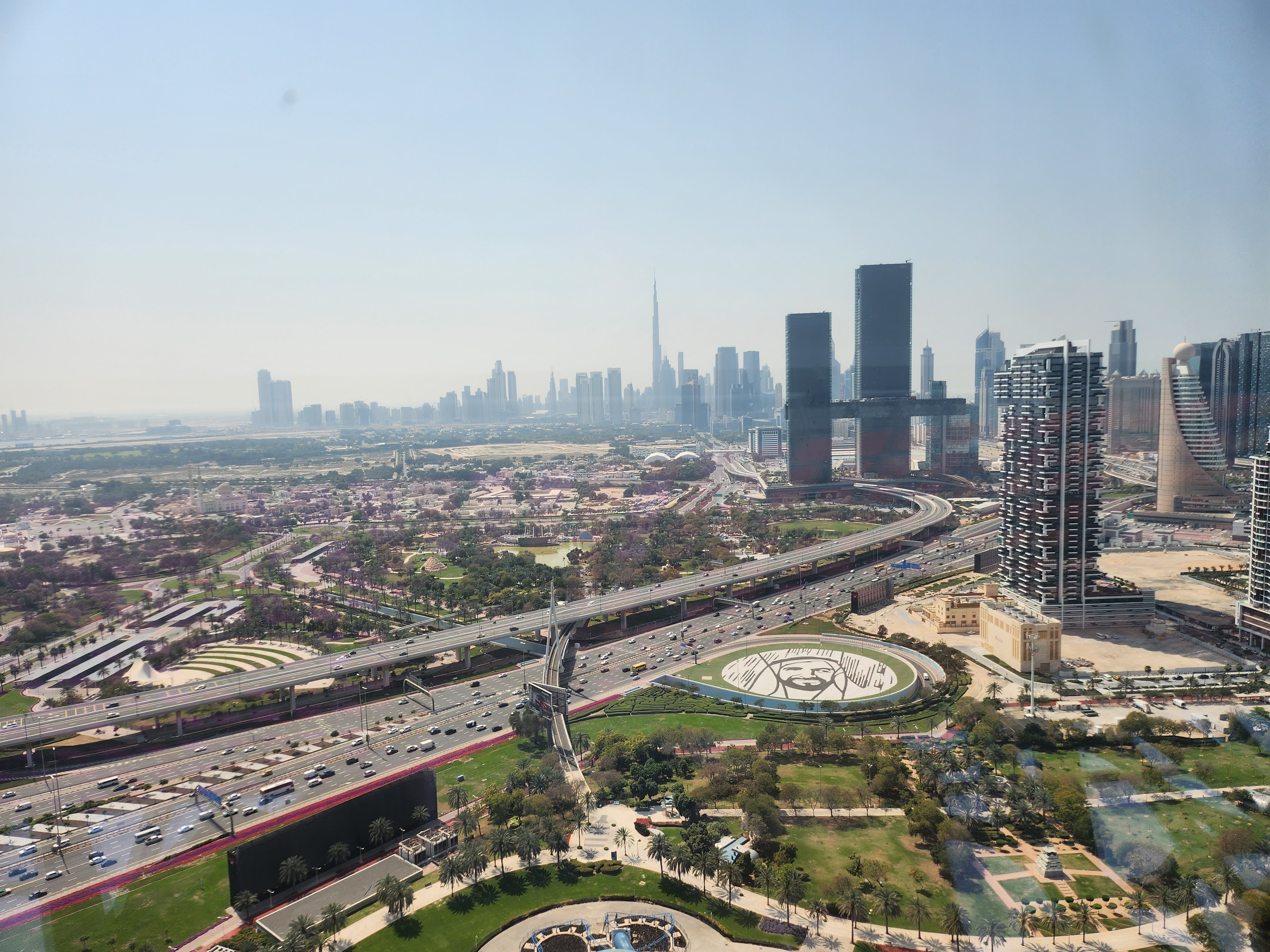
View of the downtown from the Dubai Frame Observation Deck

Dubai Frame in Zabeel Park

Zabeel Park with Dubai Frame in background

== See also ==
- List of development projects in Dubai
