= Al Karama, Dubai =

Al Karama الكرامة Karama
- Community
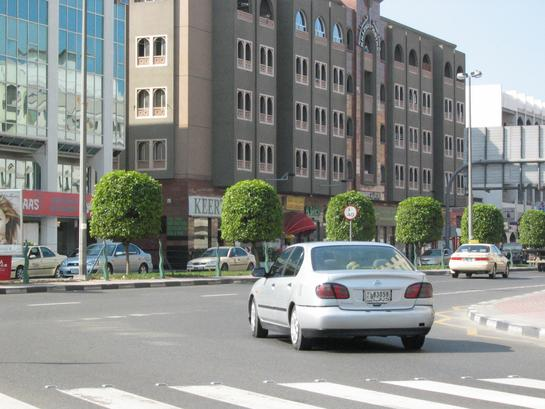
- A street in Al Karama
- Interactive map of Al Karama
- Coordinates: 25.24182°N 55.30106°E
- Country: United Arab Emirates
- Emirate: Dubai
- City: Dubai

Area
  - Total: 1.509 km^{2} (0.583 sq mi)

Population (2024)
  - Total: 75,560 (2.22%)
  - Density: 50,070/km^{2} (129,700/sq mi)
- Community number: 318

Al Karama, or simply Karama (الكرامة, literally meaning dignity), is a residential district of Dubai located on the western banks of the Dubai Creek and one of the older communities of the city. It is outwardly distinctive due to the regularity of its low-rise residential buildings. The area, which was planned on a tight grid system, is home to thousands of people even though it is only two square kilometers in size. Al Karama is the most populous residential area in Dubai and the most central part of Dubai. Al Karama is also one of the most accessible parts in Dubai, that makes it very easy for residents to travel to any other parts of the city from Karama with ease due to the wide range of transport available in the town.

== Boundaries ==
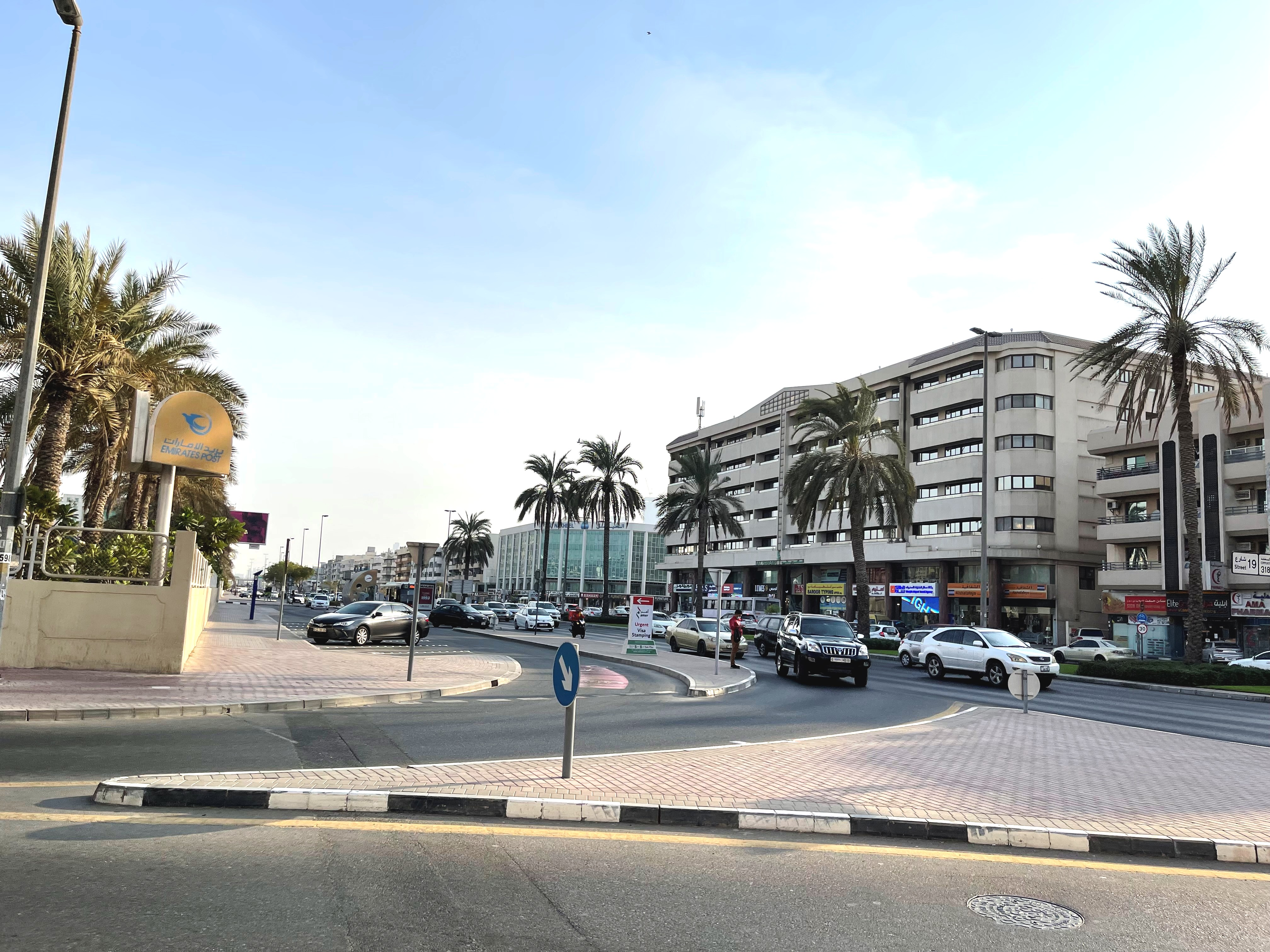
Street view in Al Karama

It stretches for 2 km between the creekside diplomatic area of Umm Hurair 1 to the north, containing numerous consulates, and Zabeel Park to the south, a $50-million technology-themed public park opened in December 2005. Zabeel Park divides Karama from the landmark Dubai World Trade Centre, as well as Sheikh Zayed Road and its famous skyscrapers. The district's western boundary is Sheikh Khalifa Bin Zayed Street (Trade Centre Road), where the popular BurJuman shopping mall is located.

== Inhabitants ==
The majority of Karama's population has traditionally been working class South Asian and Filipinos expatriates, although Dubai's cosmopolitan nature is also well represented, with the presence of many other nationalities such as people from Iran and Lebanon and many European nations. Virtually all residents are non-UAE nationals, meaning that they are obliged to rent their apartments. The typical annual rent for a one-bedroom flat was about 42,000 dirhams (US$11,500) in June 2006, having risen sharply to around 60,000 dirhams (US$16,335) during 2017.

One notable national community is the Omani contingent, who originally settled in Karama in the early 1980s with the help of Dubai's first modern ruler, Sheikh Rashid bin Saeed Al Maktoum, the late father of the current rulers. About 8,000 Omanis who were among the tens of thousands displaced from Zanzibar in the 1960s later found themselves stateless and homeless until Sheikh Rashid offered them sanctuary with the construction of Hamdan Colony, a collection of apartment blocks which still stand in Karama.

Expat residents from different parts of Dubai find themselves in Al Karama for various things such as tailoring, laundry, dining or, even shopping.

== Transport ==
=== Bus ===
Al Karama is well connected with the rest of Dubai by bus operated by the Roads and Transport Authority (Dubai) (RTA): 10, 33, 44, 83, X25, 21, 27, 28, 29, 61, 61D, 66, 67, 88, 91, 91A, C3, C5, C7, X23, X25, X28, X94, C10, C14, C18, C26, E304.

Al Karama Bus Station, as sub bus station serving Dubai is also located in the community offering buses to Dubai Silicon Oasis, Abu Hail and Sharjah.

=== Metro ===
Al Karama is also served by two metro stations on the Red Line -

- ADCB Metro Station - located in the middle of the Sheikh Khalifa Bin Zayed Street, next to the City Mart Hypermarket and the Abu Dhabi Commercial Bank (ADCB).
- BurJuman Metro Station - An underground station which also serves the communities of Al Mankhool, Al Hamriya and Umm Hurair 1.
- Oud Metha Metro Station - Al Karama can also be easily reached via a short walk from the Oud Metha Metro Station for those who live towards the outskirts of the neighbourhood.

=== Taxi ===
- The Dubai Taxi Corporation operates its taxis in and around this locality.

== Parks ==
- Karama Park (Lulu Park) - Many children and adults of all ages come here for leisurely activities.
- Zabeel Park - Karama residents closer to Za'abeel district also use the bigger Zabeel park near the newer Lulu Hypermarket for jogging and exercising. The park is well connected to Karama by a pedestrian bridge and the Sheikh Rashid Road intersection.

== Institutions ==
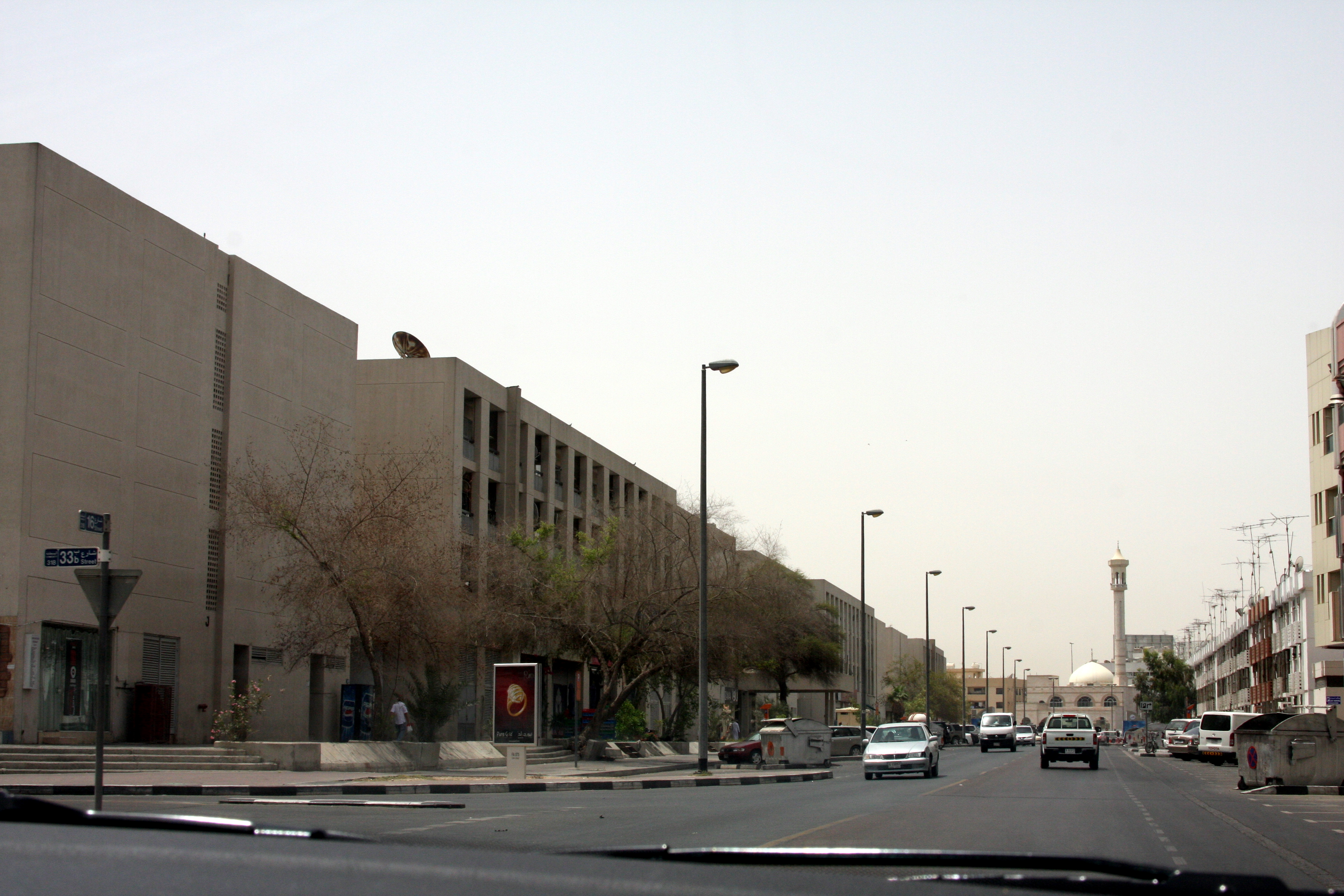
Karama Shopping Centre area of Al Karama.

=== Library ===
- Archies Library - The biggest private library in Karama (merged with the older, Book World library) and it is located across from the Burjuman Mall.

=== Laboratory ===
- Dubai Central Laboratory - Established in 1997. Functioning under the umbrella of Dubai Municipality, the DCL complex in Karama is a maze of nine massive buildings and seven sections whose long corridors open into a myriad laboratories, each with a distinct function that directly affects the daily life of the residents of UAE. DCL director Eng. Ameen Ahmad Mohammad Ameen, said, “DCL plays a crucial role in ensuring the well-being and safety of the people of Dubai by virtue of its diverse services which includes testing, calibration and certification of products which meet specified requirements and comply with Dubai Municipality regulations.”

=== Post Office ===
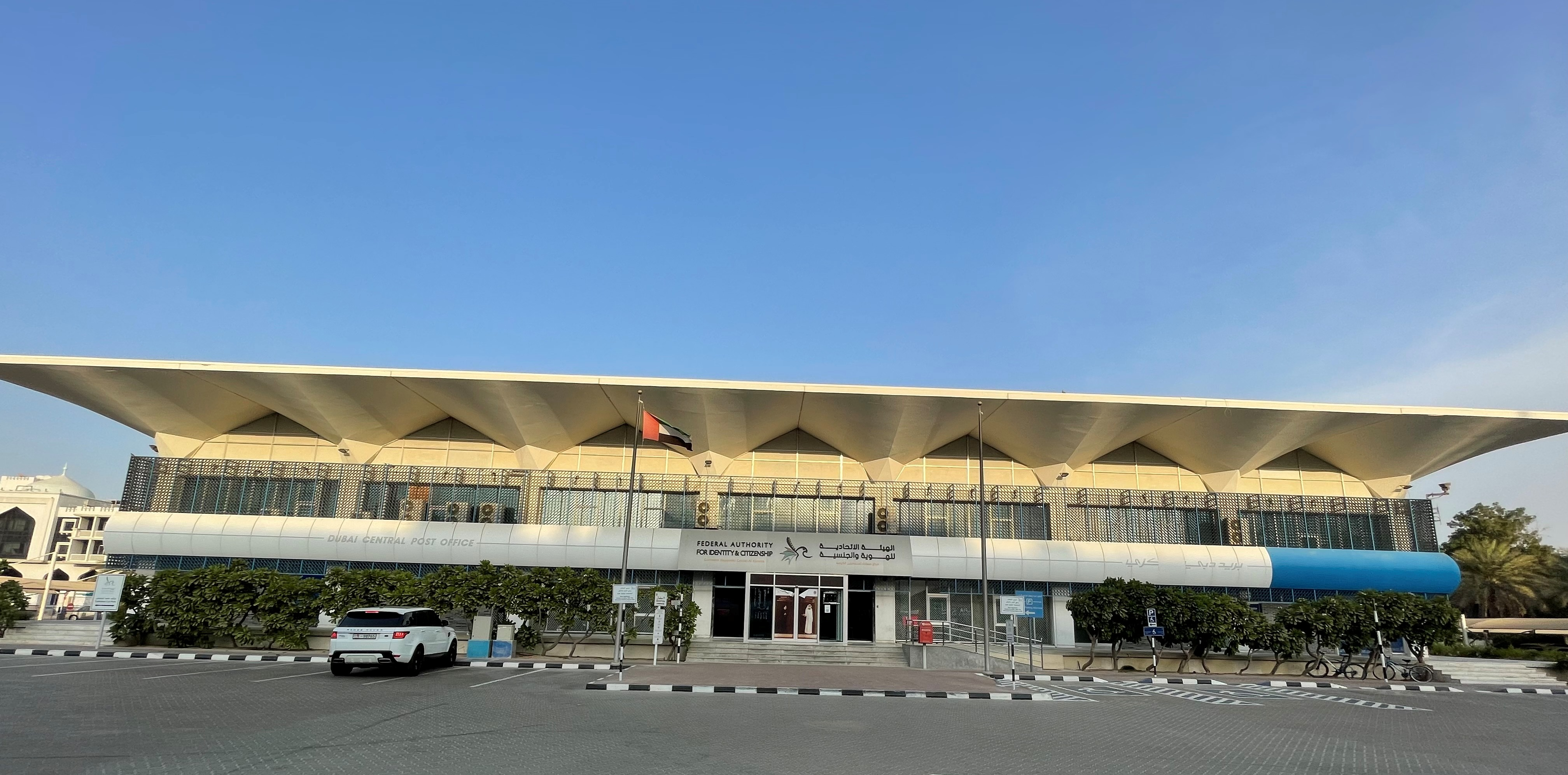
Building of Central Post and Emirates ID offices

- Dubai Central Post Office - Built in 1975. At the time of its construction in the 1970s, it was one of the biggest buildings in the country. It included the headquarters of the postal service, the central Emirates post office Dubai and one building dedicated solely to sorting. Eventually, both the headquarters and sorting centres were moved to the Umm Ramool area, which is now the central hub for Emirates Post. Emirates Post started in 2001, which then became Emirates Post Group in 2007. Emirates Post is the sole provider of postal services in the country, and one of the cheapest courier companies in Dubai. And the central post office is one of the main facilities of the entity.

=== Fire Station ===
- Civil Defense Station

=== Schools ===
- Sadiyat School
- Hemaya School
- Za'abeel Secondary School for Girls
- Khadeejah Kobra Iranian School for Girls
- Towheed Iranian School Dubai - Girls
- The Apple International Community School

=== University ===
- Wasl University

== Mosques ==
- Karama Masjid
- Al Rahma Masjid
- Karama Central Mosque
- Abdullah Al Zahri Masjid
- Ahmed Mosa Mosque
- Easa Saleh Al Gurg Mosque

== Growth ==
Mostly because this is a heavily populated area, parking in Al Karama may pose an issue. It can be challenging to find parking with the increase of each property ownership in the area. Some buildings offer basement parking but the older buildings do not offer this. Residents will then have to find street parking which can be difficult at times, especially since visitors will be using those same spaces.
